= Balcarres =

Balcarres may refer to:

- Balcarres, Saskatchewan, Canada
- Balcarres House, Fife, Scotland
- Earl of Balcarres
