= Eustachius Roche =

Eustachius Roche (floruit 1570-1600) was a Flemish mining entrepreneur in Scotland.

== Career ==
Roche was granted a monopoly to mine metals in Scotland, and work salt on the shore near Edinburgh, but his contract was terminated in 1592. His surname was sometimes written "Roghe", or Rogghe", or "Roogh". He lived in Leith.

He had a contract for lead mining in 1580. In August 1583 James VI granted Eustachius Roche a contract with monopoly rights to mine for gold, silver, copper, and lead in Scotland. He was described as a "mediciner", a physician. There were other miners at this period including George Douglas of Parkhead and Thomas Foulis. A note made in September 1584 about his work at Wanlockhead reports that Roche had worked lead and copper, and searched for copper on Langcleuch burn, but not the gold at the old mines. One of his men was called John Gibson.

He seems also to have worked for Francis Walsingham, and wrote to him in April 1583 about an opportunity to serve England involving the French ambassador which he had taken. Eustachius sent Walsingham copies of letters of Maineville carried by Rocco Bonetti. James VI gave a mineral entrepreneur, evidently Roche, a letter of introduction to Walsingham in January 1584. He was travelling abroad to find expert workmen.

On 25 September 1588 Eustachius wrote from Edinburgh to a colleague Geoffrey le Broman. He discussed their alchemical practices. He had also been making salt from sea water, and claimed to have a new method that would undercut the price of French salt. He had made a contract with James VI that would make him rich, and Robert Sidney, who had recently been English ambassador in Edinburgh, had begun to discuss a similar privilege for him in England. Sidney left Edinburgh sooner than planned because of the death of his uncle, the Earl of Leicester. Roche thought Geoffrey could forward his schemes by reminding Sidney, preferably by approaching an acquaintance, Stephen Lesieur, Sidney's secretary. Geoffrey might also speak to Francis Walsingham. He enclosed a sample of salt and some Scottish flax that might interest a Master Martin. Eustachius sent a copy of his salt contract, to work salt pans at Newhaven on the west side of Leith, as a model.

Roche had these privileges for his trade secret, which was "the form of his furnaces and making of his great salt, which he will he not be content be communicated to others". In April 1588 the Privy Council, impressed with his estimates to improve revenue, made an act that Roche's heirs would inherit his 10% share. The council also declared it would seek justice for the murder of his workman Nicholas Wanraust or Van Raust.

On 27 December 1588 Edinburgh council allowed Roche the same lease or "tack" of lands at Newhaven, as the Englishmen had before, meaning the works previously set to Cornelius de Vos and his partners. The works were at the shore of the Wester Links of Leith between Wardie Brow and St Nicolas Chapel. In July 1590 he was asked to pay three years arrears of rent for the Newhaven holding. He gave up his lease on 12 May 1592.

In 1592 David Lindsay of Edzell complained to the Privy Council about Roche and his contract for metals. Lindsay had discovered copper on his lands of Glen Esk and Edzell. But Roche had a monopoly on mining in Scotland, so Lindsay offered to form a partnership. He wanted the Privy Council to summon Roche and make him form a partnership or allow Lindsay to manage his own mines. Accordingly, Roche and Lindsay formed a partnership, and Roche was to pay his share of Lindsay's costs to date. This was a manoeuvre to wrongfoot Roche.

Soon after, in June 1592, the Parliament of Scotland created a new office, the Master of Metals to be in charge of mines and refining. John Lindsay of Menmuir, the brother of David Lindsay, was appointed. In order to ensure Roche resigned his rights, information damaging his reputation was collected from the Dutch Republic and Flanders by the means of the diplomat Adrian Damman, and a Scottish merchant in Antwerp, Jacques or Jacob Barron, and it was said he was of "evil fame." The murder of one of his workmen, Nicholas van Raust, at the lead mine by a man called Gibson was deemed irrelevant to mining issues.

Robert Jousie, whose business partner Thomas Foulis had a copper mine, forwarded a letter from Lord Menmuir to the Conservator of Privileges at Veere, Robert Denniston, about an old legal case concerning Roche. Denniston confirmed "It imports no small dishonour and interest to his Majesty and the country so long to suffer an infamous person to have charge of the mines."

Archibald Napier of Merchiston Castle responded to the act appointing Lindsay and advised on the "reduction", the legal challenge, to Roche's contract. While interested parties were submitting their views to the Privy Council, Marion Douglas, the wife of George Douglas of Parkhead, was trying to manage their lead and silver mines in August 1592. She wrote to Menmuir about the uncertain status of their contract in the new legislative framework. She had to put the workmen to other tasks, or lay them off.

Eustachius Roche's mining rights were removed, and he may have left Scotland for a time. His son Frederick was baptised in Edinburgh on 2 August 1597, and David Lindsay of Edzell was a witness.

In 1599 his monopolies and patents for improved kilns and stoves, chimneys and furnaces were ratified by the Parliament of Scotland. Roche petitioned the king to supply him with pans as per the contract. The king awarded a share of the potential income to Colonel William Stewart.

The salt pans at Newhaven, on common land and formerly held by the English saltmakers, were worked by two Flemish contractors Peter Scheves and Jacques Deburtyene. Eustachius Roche or Roog paid half the annualrent of £20 due to William Napier of Wrychtishouses and his wife Elizabeth Park.
