= Robert Lindsay, 29th Earl of Crawford =

Scottish hereditary peer (1927–2023)

The Right Honourable The Earl of Crawford and Balcarres KT GCVO PC DL
- Lindsay in 1969

Minister of State for Foreign and Commonwealth Affairs
- In office 5 November 1972 – 4 March 1974
- Prime Minister: Edward Heath
- Preceded by: Joseph Godber
- Succeeded by: David Ennals

Minister of State for Defence
- In office 23 June 1970 – 5 November 1972
- Prime Minister: Edward Heath
- Preceded by: Office established
- Succeeded by: Ian Gilmour

Shadow Secretary of State for Health and Social Services
- In office 10 October 1967 – 19 June 1970
- Leader: Edward Heath
- Preceded by: Mervyn Pike
- Succeeded by: Richard Crossman
Parliamentary offices
Member of the House of Lords
Lord Temporal
Hereditary peerage 13 December 1975 – 11 November 1999
Preceded by	The 28th Earl of Crawford
Succeeded by	Seat abolished
Life peerage 24 January 1975 – 28 November 2019
Member of Parliament for Welwyn Hatfield Hertford (1955–74)
In office 26 May 1955 – 20 September 1974
Preceded by	Constituency Redrawn
Succeeded by	Helene Hayman

Personal details
- Born: Robert Alexander Lindsay; 5 March 1927 London, England
- Died: 18 March 2023 (aged 96) Fife, Scotland
- Party: Conservative
- Spouse: Ruth Meyer-Bechtler (m. 1949; died 2021)
- Children: 4, including Anthony
- Parent: David Lindsay (father)
- Education: Eton College
- Alma mater: Trinity College, Cambridge

Robert Alexander Lindsay, 29th Earl of Crawford, 12th Earl of Balcarres, (Note: Succeeded to these titles upon the death of David Lindsay, 28th Earl of Crawford, 11th Earl of Balcarres, in December 1975.) Baron Balniel, (Note: Granted a peerage under the Life Peerages Act 1958 as Baron Balniel, of Pitcorthie in the County of Fife, in January 1975.) KT, GCVO, PC, DL (5 March 1927 – 18 March 2023), known by courtesy as Lord Balniel between 1940 and 1975, was a Scottish hereditary peer and Conservative politician who was a member of Parliament from 1955 to 1974. He was chief of Clan Lindsay and also acted, from 1975 to 2019, as Premier Earl of Scotland. (Note: The Premier Earldom in the Peerage of Scotland is that of Sutherland, created c. 1230. Held for a long time by the Leveson-Gower family, this earldom passed to Elizabeth Sutherland, 24th Countess of Sutherland (1921–2019), in 1963, who, as a woman, was at the time considered to be unsuitable for functioning as Premier Earl, so the Earls of Crawford, being next in the order of precedence, occupied the position until the earldom of Sutherland passed to a male holder (Alistair Sutherland, 25th Earl of Sutherland; born 1947) in 2019.)

After the October 1974 general election, Lindsay was made a life peer and joined the House of Lords. Following the death of Lord Eden of Winton in 2020, Lindsay became the surviving former MP with the earliest date of first election, having first entered Parliament at the 1955 general election.

== Early life ==
The elder son of the 28th Earl of Crawford and 11th Earl of Balcarres, he was born on 5 March 1927, and educated at Eton College and Trinity College, Cambridge. From 1945 to 1948, he served in the Grenadier Guards. He was honorary attaché at the British Embassy in Paris from 1950 to 1951 and then worked for the Conservative Research Department.

== Career ==
Balniel was elected for the Conservative Party in Hertford at the 1955 general election, aged 28, and served as parliamentary private secretary to Henry Brooke until 1959. From 1959 to 1965, Balniel was president of the Rural District Councils Association, and from 1963 to 1970, he was chair of the National Association for Mental Health.

While the Conservative Party was in opposition, Balniel served as spokesman on Foreign Affairs from 1965 until 1967, and then joined the Shadow Cabinet as spokesman on Social Services. Following the party's victory in the 1970 general election, he served as minister of state for Defence, and then from 1972 was minister of state for Foreign and Commonwealth Affairs.

Balniel switched to represent Welwyn and Hatfield at the February 1974 general election, narrowly winning the seat, but he was defeated in the general election in October. He was given a peerage under the Life Peerages Act 1958 as Baron Balniel, of Pitcorthie in the County of Fife, in January 1975 before succeeding as Earl of Crawford in December the same year. After the passage of House of Lords Act 1999, he sat in the Lords by virtue of his life peerage. He retired from the House of Lords on 28 November 2019.

He was chairman of Historic Buildings Council for Scotland, the Royal Commission on the Ancient and Historical Monuments of Scotland and the National Library of Scotland.

== Appointments ==
Crawford was appointed first Crown Estate commissioner from 1980 to 1985. Crawford was Lord Chamberlain to Queen Elizabeth the Queen Mother between 1992 and her death in 2002. He was appointed a Knight Grand Cross of the Royal Victorian Order (GCVO) in the 2002 Demise Honours, the special honours list published after the Queen Mother's death.

== Marriage and children ==
Crawford married Ruth Beatrice Meyer-Bechtler (1924–2021) on 27 December 1949. They had four children:

- Lady Bettina Mary Lindsay (born 26 June 1950)
- Lady Iona Sina Lindsay (born 10 August 1957) married Charles Gerard Mackworth-Young, son of Robin Mackworth-Young.
- Anthony Robert Lindsay, 30th Earl of Crawford (born 24 November 1958)
- The Hon Alexander Walter Lindsay (born 18 March 1961)

Lord Crawford died at Balcarres House on 18 March 2023, at age 96. His hereditary titles passed to his eldest son, Anthony.

== Honours ==
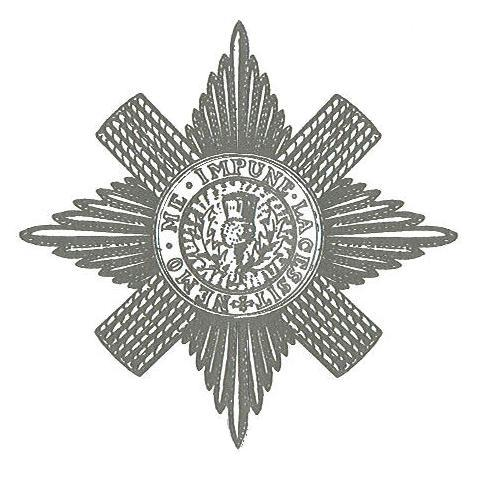
The Star of the Thistle

- Knight of the Thistle, 1996
- Knight Grand Cross of the Royal Victorian Order, 2002
- Privy Counsellor, 4 February 1972
- Deputy lieutenant of Fife, 23 July 1976

== Arms ==
Coat of arms of Robert Lindsay, 29th Earl of Crawford
Notes Crest A Swan's Head neck and wings Proper issuing from an antique Ducal-coronet Or Escutcheon Quarterly, 1st and 4th, Gules a Fess chequy Argent and Azure (Lindsay), 2nd and 3rd, Or a Lion rampant Gules debruised of a ribbon in bend Sable (Abernethy) Supporters Two Lions rampant guardant Gules armed and langued Azure Motto Endure fort (en: Suffer bravely) Orders Thistle Circlet

== See also ==
- Balcarres House, Fife
- Peerage of Scotland

== Notes ==
Parliament of the United Kingdom
Preceded by Sir Derek Walker-Smith	Member of Parliament for Hertford; February 1974 – 1955	Constituency abolished
New constituency	Member of Parliament for Welwyn and Hatfield; February 1974–October 1974	Succeeded by Helene Hayman
Court offices
Preceded by The Earl of Dalhousie	Lord Chamberlain to Queen Elizabeth the Queen Mother; 1992–2002	Death of Queen Elizabeth the Queen Mother
Peerage of Scotland
Preceded by David Lindsay	Earl of Crawford; 1975–2023	Succeeded by Anthony Lindsay
Preceded by David Lindsay	Earl of Balcarres; 1975–2023	Succeeded by Anthony Lindsay
