= Marie Ruthven, Countess of Atholl =

Scottish aristocrat

Marie Ruthven, Countess of Atholl, was a Scottish aristocrat.

She was a daughter of William Ruthven, 1st Earl of Gowrie, and Dorothea Stewart, the oldest daughter of Henry Stewart, 1st Lord Methven, and Janet Stewart, a daughter of John Stewart, 2nd Earl of Atholl.

== First marriage ==
In 1578 she married John Stewart, 5th Earl of Atholl (d. 1595), son of John Stewart, 4th Earl of Atholl, and Margaret Fleming. The wedding was celebrated as Perth with dancing and masques.

On 14 November 1578 she wrote as "Marie Countas of Atholl" to Barbara Stewart, Lady Weem, the wife of James Menzies of Weem and her husband's aunt, to invite her to Cupar to describe to her the fashion and manners of a place where she intended to travel.

She had five daughters with John Stewart:

- Margaret Stewart
- Dorothea Stewart, who married William Murray, 2nd Earl of Tullibardine
- Mary Stewart, who married (1) in 1603, John Stewart, 2nd Earl of Atholl, and (2) Peter Rollo
- Jean Stewart (d. 1623), who married (1) in 1603, Henry Stewart, 1st Lord Saint Colme, and (2) Nicol Bellenden
- Anne Stewart, who married in 1604, Andrew Stewart, 2nd Baron Castle Stuart

Two sons died in infancy.

On 24 July 1593 she helped Francis Stewart, 5th Earl of Bothwell, enter Holyrood Palace in disguise. The Countess of Atholl had access to a back gate of the palace which led to her mother, Dorothea Stewart, Countess of Gowrie House. The English ambassador Robert Bowes thought she was an ally of Elizabeth I and opposed to the faction of the Earl of Huntly, and in October he advised that Elizabeth should send her a jewel as a token of support. The king's favourite, George Home was now lodged in the house by Holyrood.

On the death of her husband in 1595 there was no male heir. The Atholl earldom reverted to the crown by "non-entry". The rights to award the marriages of her daughters was given by James VI to Anne of Denmark on 1 September 1595.

There was much discussion about the earldom. Anne of Denmark was thought to claim it for herself or for her son Prince Henry. The Earl of Orkney requested it, as compensation for his expenses at court in 1594.

== Second marriage ==
In March 1596 Marie Ruthven married John Stewart 6th Lord Innermeath. In May 1596 he was newly created Earl of Atholl, after the countess had bought back the rights to the earldom for £10,000 Scots.

There was a rumour in August 1597 that the Countess of Atholl was suspected of involvement in a plot to poison to James VI.

Marie Ruthven and her new husband arrested Agnes McCawis and Bessie Ireland as suspected witches. The two women accused two more women from Dunkeld of witchcraft, Margaret Stewart and Isobel Douglas, who complained of their unjust imprisonment to the Privy Council of Scotland. Marie Ruthven and the Earl were ordered to bring the four women to Edinburgh. According to the Chronicle of Perth, Bessie Ireland, Jonet Robertson, and Marion McCauss were burnt on the South Inch on 9 September 1597.

In November 1597, Atholl and Marie Ruthven armed their followers and marched to the House of Moircleuch and besieged Walter Leslie, and brought him back to Blair Atholl and imprisoned him. Around this time he and his followers attacked Andrew Spalding at Ashintully Castle in Strathardle, bringing great guns, hagbuts, and pistols and raising fire at his house.

As a powerful aristocrat, Marie Ruthven was able to influence the exercise of justice in Scotland. In July 1599 she wrote to David Lindsay of Edzell, an extraordinary Lord of Session, complaining that he had failed to help her husband's causes and he should in future, "follow his lordship in tyme cuming in ane mair effectuiss maneir of freyndschip nor ye haif done afoirtymes gyf ye wiss to haif his Lo: to do you plesour", or in modern spelling; "follow his Lordship in time coming a more effectuous manner of friendship than you have done before, if you wish to have his Lordship to do you pleasure".

Two of her brothers were killed in the Gowrie Conspiracy at the family's house in Perth on 5 August 1600. After this, Marie Ruthven was still allowed to visit the Scottish court. She had to be very cautious, and the English diplomat George Nicholson mentioned that when she visited Falkland Palace in November 1601 she was careful while speaking to King James to refer to her brother as a traitor.

John Stewart died in 1603. The next earl was his son from his first marriage to Margaret Lindsay, James Stewart, 2nd Earl of Atholl (died 1625). In October 1603 Marie Ruthven wrote to Lord Cecil from Dunkeld asking for his help in her lawsuits. In 1605, she was in litigation with the new earl.

John's daughter Dorothea Stewart married William Murray, 2nd Earl of Tullibardine, and their son John became Earl of Atholl in 1629.
