= Edzell Castle =

Castle ruin and walled garden in UK

Coordinates: 56.8115°N 2.6819°W

- Near Edzell, Angus, Scotland grid reference NO584691
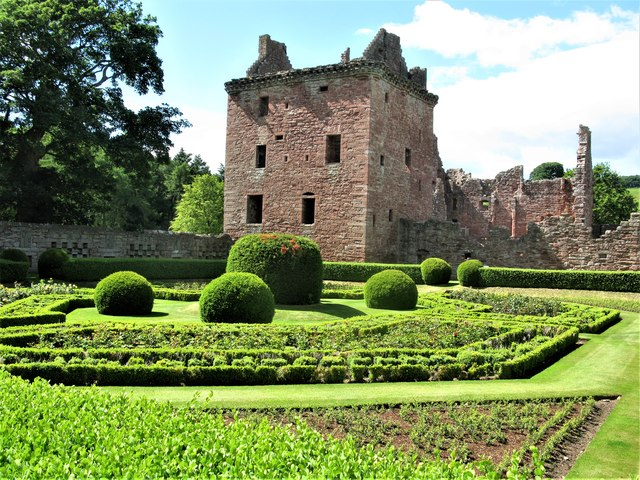
- The castle in 2018

Site information
- Type: Tower house and courtyard
- Owner: Earl of Dalhousie, managed by Historic Environment Scotland
- Controlled by: Lindsays of Edzell
- Open to the public: Yes
- Condition: Ruined

Site history
- Built: c. 1520 – 1610
- Built by: David Lindsay, 9th Earl of Crawford
- In use: Until 1715
- Materials: Old Red Sandstone

Listed Building – Category B
- Official name: Edzell Castle Custodian's House
- Designated: 11 June 1971
- Reference no.: LB11258

Inventory of Gardens and Designed Landscapes in Scotland
- Official name: Edzell Castle
- Designated: 1 July 1987
- Reference no.: GDL00169

Scheduled monument
- Official name: Edzell Castle
- Type: Secular: castle
- Designated: 30 November 1981
- Reference no.: SM90136

Scheduled monument
- Official name: Castle Hillock
- Type: Secular: motte
- Designated: 8 October 1959
- Reference no.: SM137

Edzell Castle is a ruined 16th-century castle, with an early-17th-century walled garden. It is located close to Edzell, and is around 5 miles (8 km) north of Brechin, in Angus, Scotland. Edzell Castle was begun around 1520 by David Lindsay, 9th Earl of Crawford, and expanded by his son, Sir David Lindsay, Lord Edzell, who also laid out the garden in 1604. The castle saw little military action, and was, in its design, construction and use, more of a country house than a defensive structure. It was briefly occupied by English troops during Oliver Cromwell's invasion of Scotland in 1651. In 1715 it was sold by the Lindsay family, and eventually came into the ownership of the Earl of Dalhousie. It was given into state care in the 1930s, and is now a visitor attraction run by Historic Environment Scotland (seasonal opening; entrance charge). The castle consists of the original tower house and building ranges around a courtyard. The adjacent Renaissance walled garden, incorporating intricate relief carvings, is unique in Scotland. It was replanted in the 1930s, and is considered to have links to esoteric traditions, including Rosicrucianism and Freemasonry.

== History ==
=== Origins ===
The first castle at Edzell was a timber motte and bailey structure, built to guard the mouth of Glenesk, a strategic pass leading north into the Highlands. The motte, or mound, is still visible 300 metres (980 ft) south-west of the present castle, and dates from the 12th century. It was the seat of the Abbott, or Abbe, family, and was the centre of the now-vanished original village of Edzell. The Abbotts were succeeded as lords of Edzell by the Stirlings of Glenesk, and the Stirlings in turn by the Lindsays. In 1358, Sir Alexander de Lindsay, third son of David Lindsay of Crawford, married the Stirling heiress, Katherine Stirling. Alexander's son, David, was created Earl of Crawford in 1398.

Edzell became the property of a junior branch of the Lindsay family descended from the 3rd Earl, and in 1513 it was inherited by David Lindsay (d. 1558). Around 1520, David Lindsay decided to abandon the original castle, and built a tower house and barmkin, or courtyard, in a more sheltered location nearby. The selection of a site overlooked by higher ground to the north suggests that defence was not the primary concern. David became the Earl of Crawford in 1542, on the death of his cousin the 8th Earl, who had disinherited his own son Alexander, the "Wicked Master". He proceeded to extend the simple tower house, in around 1550, by the addition of a large west range, incorporating a new entrance gate and hall. Lord Crawford also built Invermark Castle, 12 miles (19 km) north of Edzell, possibly as a hunting lodge, at around the same time.

Mary, Queen of Scots, came to Edzell on 25 August 1562. A plan to meet Elizabeth I in England had been abandoned, and she was making a progress to Aberdeen and Inverness. Mary wrote to Katharine, Countess of Crawford, to make provision for her during another progress in September 1564. In 1573 a room at the castle was known as the "Queen's chamber".

=== Sir David Lindsay, Lord Edzell ===
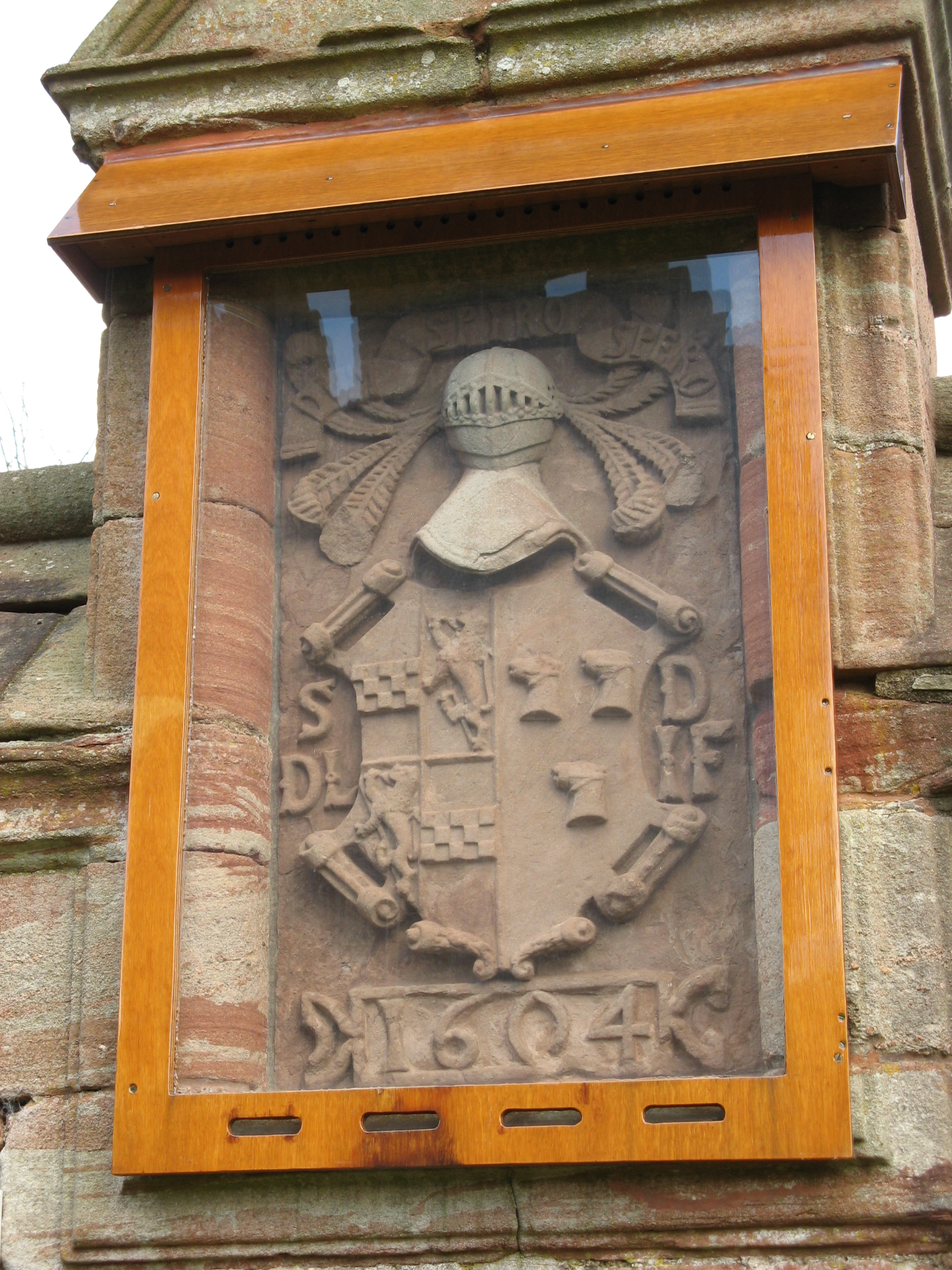
Arms of Sir David Lindsay, and his wife, Dame Isabel Forbes, over the garden gate

David Lindsay, the 9th Earl's son, was educated in Paris and Cambridge, and travelled in continental Europe. His father had nominated the son of Alexander, the Wicked Master, as heir to the earldom, returning the title to the senior line of the family, and thus Lindsay did not succeed to the earldom on his father's death. However, he was knighted in 1581, became a Lord of Session (a senior judge), taking the title Lord Edzell, in 1593, and in 1598 was appointed to the Privy Council. A Renaissance Man, he undertook improvements to his estates, including mining and woodland planting. Two German prospectors from Nuremberg, Bernard Fechtenburg and Hans Ziegler, were invited to search for precious metals around Edzell.

In August 1562, David Lindsay received Mary, Queen of Scots, at Edzell. The Queen was on a Royal progress, with the aim of subduing the rebellious George Gordon, 5th Earl of Huntly, and spent two nights at Edzell. During her stay, she convened a meeting of the Privy Council, attended by the nobility of Scotland. Her son, King James VI, visited Edzell twice; on 28 June 1580, and in August 1589. On 5 August 1589 the Earl of Erroll came to James VI at Edzell and submitted to his mercy, while accusing the 6th Earl of Huntly of further treasons. The next day the news arrived at Edzell that Henry III of France had been assassinated at Saint-Cloud by a Dominican friar, Jacques Clément.

Sir David further extended the castle in the late 16th century, with the addition of a large north range with round corner towers. He laid out the garden in 1604, with symbols of England, Scotland and Ireland, to celebrate the Union of the Crowns of the previous year, when James VI acceded to the English throne on the death of his cousin, Elizabeth I. Sir David died in 1610, heavily in debt as a result of fines handed down for the unruly conduct of his son, and with both the garden and the north range incomplete.

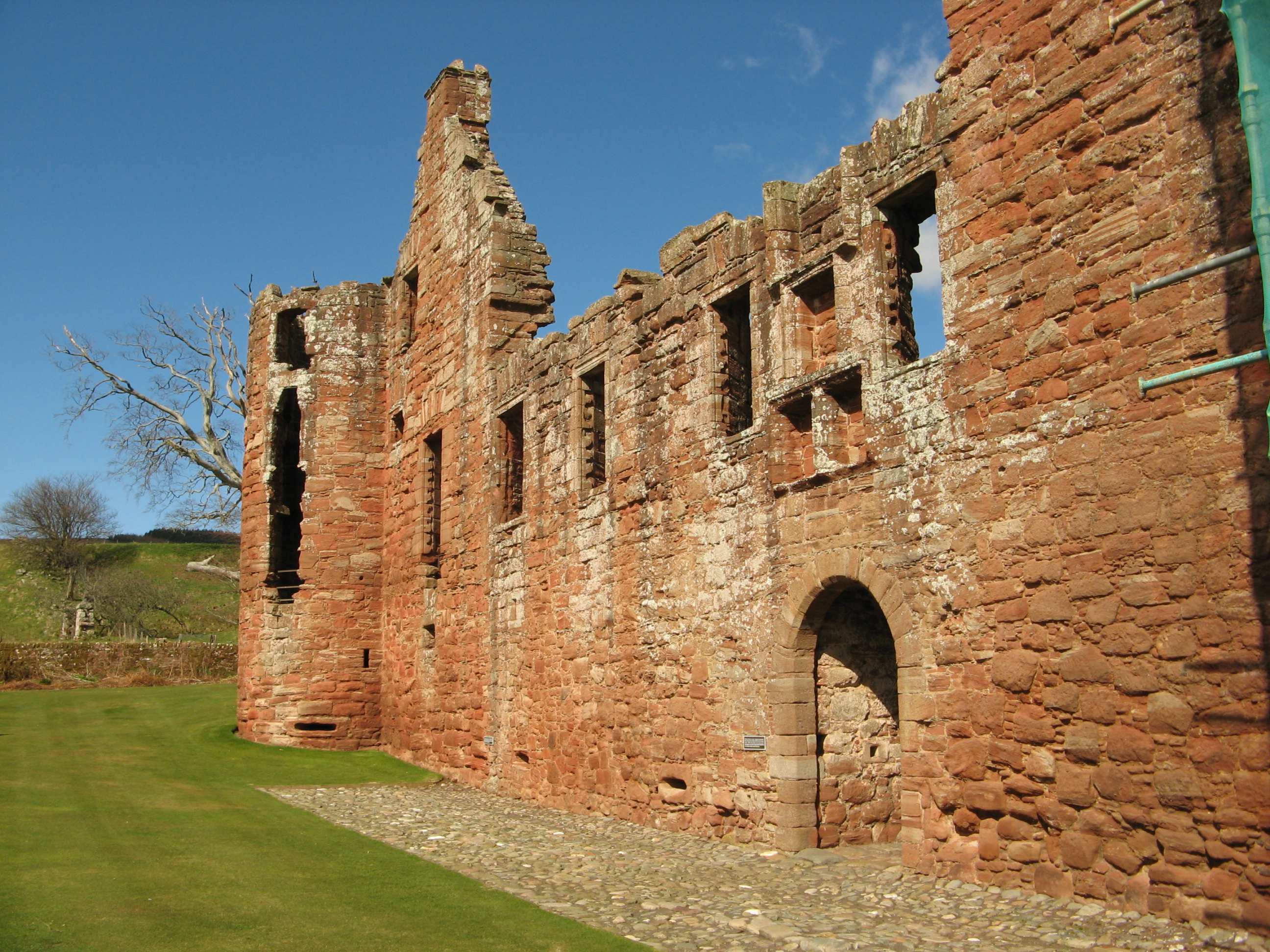
The outer wall of the west range, looking north

=== Damage and decline ===
Edzell was not affected by the campaigns of the Royalist Marquess of Montrose in the 1640s, although other properties of the Covenanting Presbyterian David Lindsay (son of Sir David), were attacked. During the Third English Civil War, Oliver Cromwell invaded Scotland and, in September 1651, his troops took Edzell, and were stationed there for one month. By the time of the Presbyterian settlement of 1689, the Lord of Edzell, David's son John Lindsay, had switched allegiances from Presbyterianism to Episcopalianism. Along with the parish minister, he was barred from the parish church, and Episcopal services were held in the great hall at Edzell.

The castle began to decline around the time of the 1715 Jacobite rising. The last Lindsay lord of Edzell, another David, was a Jacobite, a supporter of the exiled James Stuart, the "Old Pretender". Faced with mounting family debts, David sold the castle to the 4th Earl of Panmure, a fellow Jacobite, for £192,502 Scots, equivalent to £16,042 sterling. Lord Panmure, however, forfeited his lands and property for taking part in the failed rebellion. Edzell was sold, by the Crown, to the York Buildings Company, a London waterworks company which had branched into the buying and selling of forfeited property. They proceeded to "asset strip" the property.

The castle saw its last military event in 1746, when a unit of government troops, of the Argyll and Sutherland Highlanders, occupied the building, causing further damage. By 1764, the York Buildings Company was bankrupt, and the remaining contents of the castle, including the roofs, were removed and sold to pay the company's creditors. The avenue of beech trees, which linked the castle and the village, was felled, and the property was sold to William Maule, Earl Panmure, nephew of the attainted Earl of Panmure. He died in 1782, and the property passed to his nephew, George Ramsay, 8th Earl of Dalhousie.

=== Later history ===
The castle remained the property of the earls of Dalhousie, who appointed a caretaker from the 1870s, and built a cottage for him in 1901, which is now in use as a visitor centre. In 1932, the walled garden passed into state care, followed by the rest of the castle in 1935. The castle and garden are currently maintained by Historic Environment Scotland and are open to the public year-round. The motte and castle are protected as Scheduled Ancient Monuments, and the garden is included in the Inventory of Historic Gardens and Designed Landscapes, the national listing of significant gardens. The caretaker's house is a Category B listed building.

== Description ==
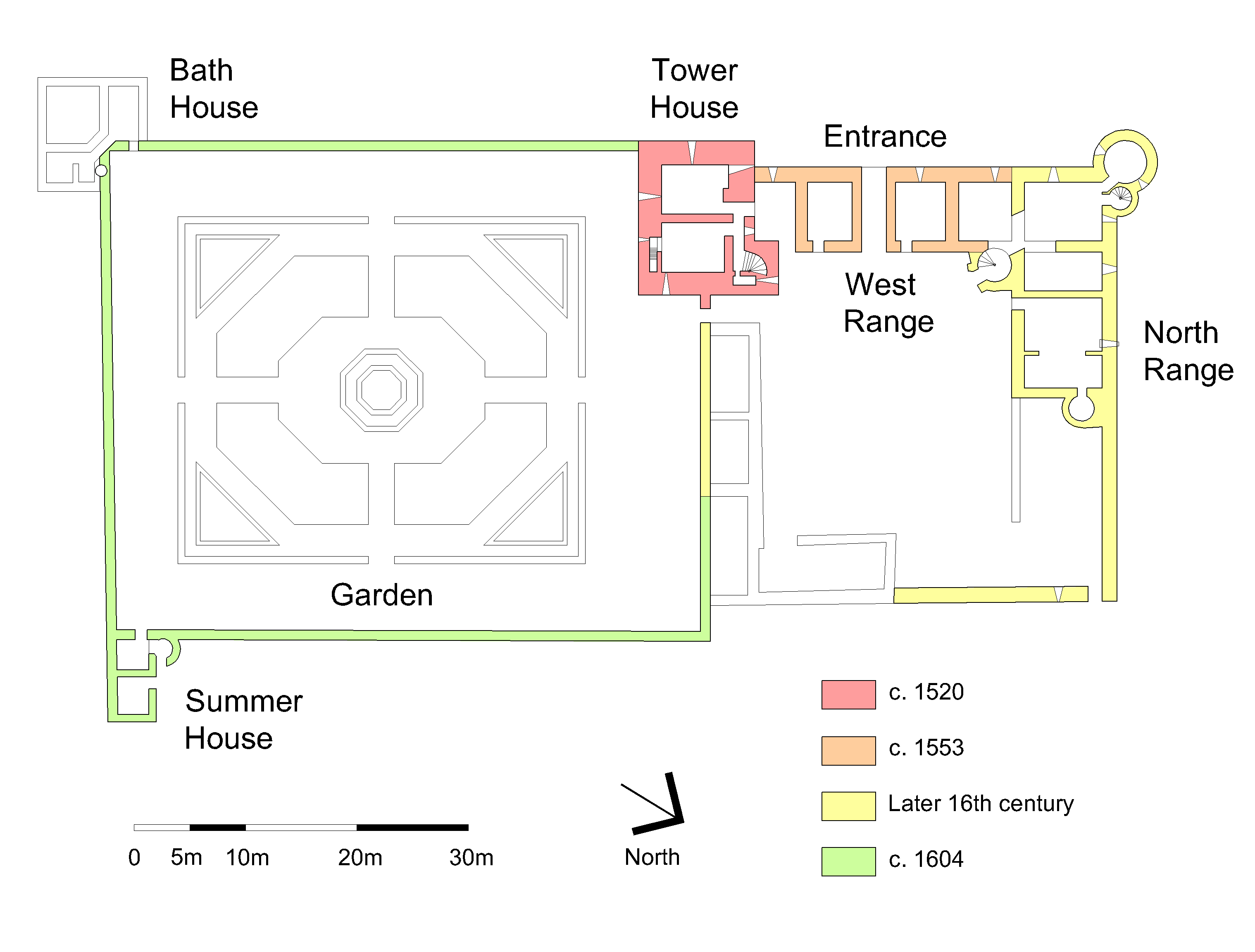
Ground floor plan of the castle, showing phases of construction

=== The motte ===
The motte, still known as Castlehillock, is the only remainder of the first Edzell Castle. It lies 300m south-west of the later castle, by a bend in the West Water, and comprises a low, partially natural mound. The motte is aligned north-west to south-east, and is around 36 metres (118 ft) long by 16 metres (52 ft) across at its broadest point, and around 4 metres (13 ft) high. An outer bailey, or courtyard, up to 61 metres (200 ft) across formerly surrounded the motte, and was bordered by a deep ditch.

=== The castle ===
The castle comprises the early 16th-century tower house, the slightly later west range, and the late 16th-century north range. Other buildings to the east and south have now vanished. The red sandstone walls were originally harled.

The four-storey tower house was named the Stirling Tower after the original lords of Edzell, the Stirlings of Glenesk, although it is not old enough to have been built by them. It is 16 metres (52 ft) high, and measures 13 metres (43 ft) by 10 metres (33 ft) on plan. The walls are over 2 metres (6.6 ft) thick at the basement, narrowing to 1.5 metres (4.9 ft) on the first floor. The tower house is entered from the north, via a door protected by "inverted keyhole" shaped gun holes. A slot adjacent to the door would have held a draw-bar, to reinforce the entry, and several mason's marks remain around the door. The hall occupies the first floor, above two vaulted cellars. Marks in the wall show the position of a minstrels' gallery and a timber screen, which concealed a serving area accessed via a narrow stair from the cellar. The broad main spiral stair led up to three further storeys of private chambers, before reaching a cap-house, a small rooftop chamber giving access to a parapet walk. The four corners of the tower have bartizans, or open turrets, and similar projections occur halfway along each wall. The parapet is supported on projecting stones, or corbels, arranged in a pattern of two tiers which alternate, rendering the lower tier purely decorative. Edzell represents an early occurrence of this style, known as chequered corbelling, which became more widespread later in the 16th century.

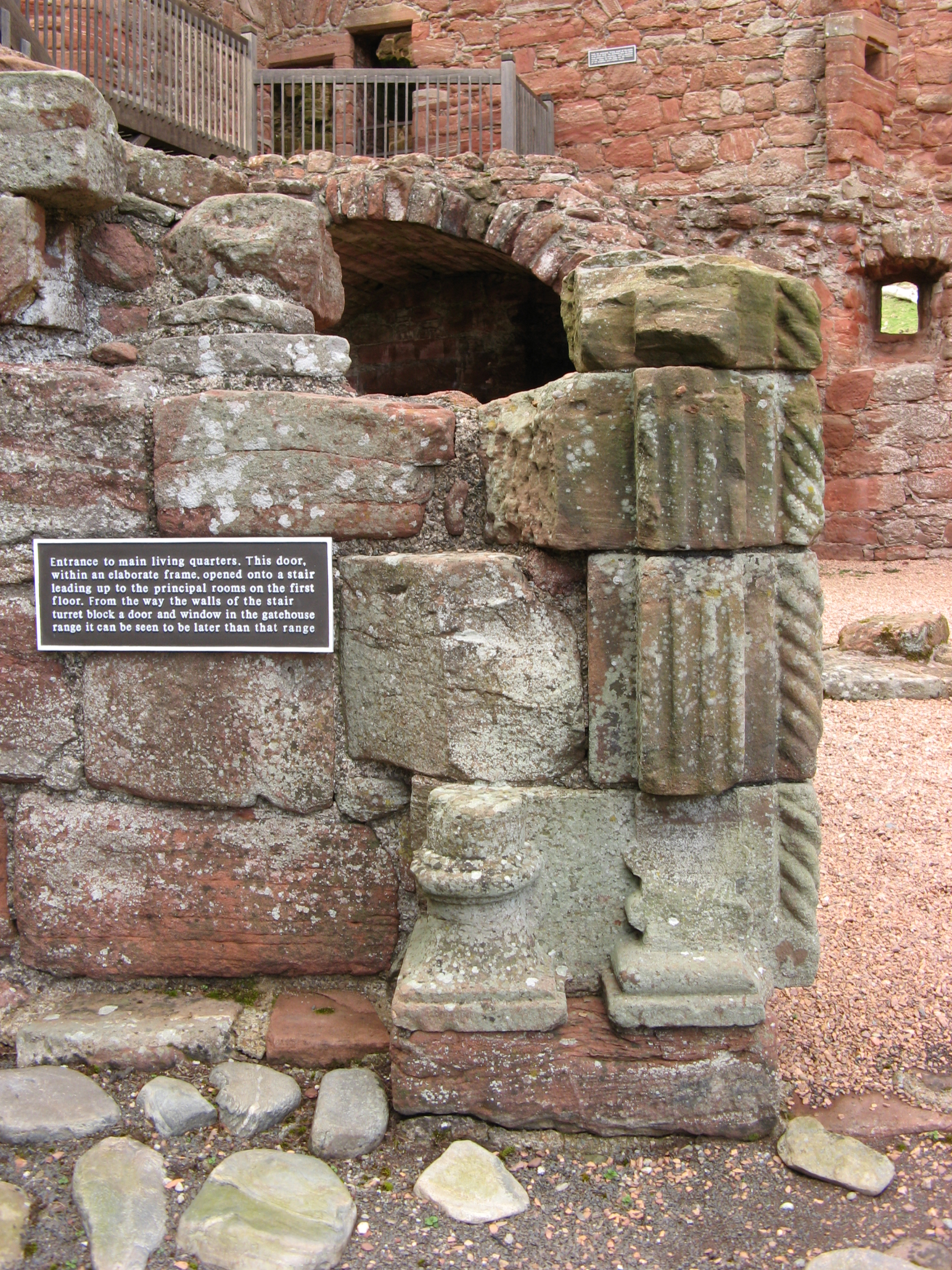
Remains of decorative carving around the door to the courtyard stair tower

The two-storey west range contains the main entrance, which enters the courtyard via an arched passage. Above the outside gate are spaces where armorial panels were once displayed. The windows on this front, larger than the original ones in the tower house, had iron grilles, and small gun holes beneath them. Beside the entrance was a kitchen, and above, a larger hall and drawing room. Only the western part of the three-storey north range was completed, although the Lindsays planned to complete the courtyard. This range had another kitchen, as well as private chambers within the round tower at the north-west corner. It was entered via a stair turret in the courtyard, fragments of which remain, including parts of an intricately carved door surround. Only the foundations of the east and south buildings remain, which probably contained a bakehouse and stables.

== The walled garden ==
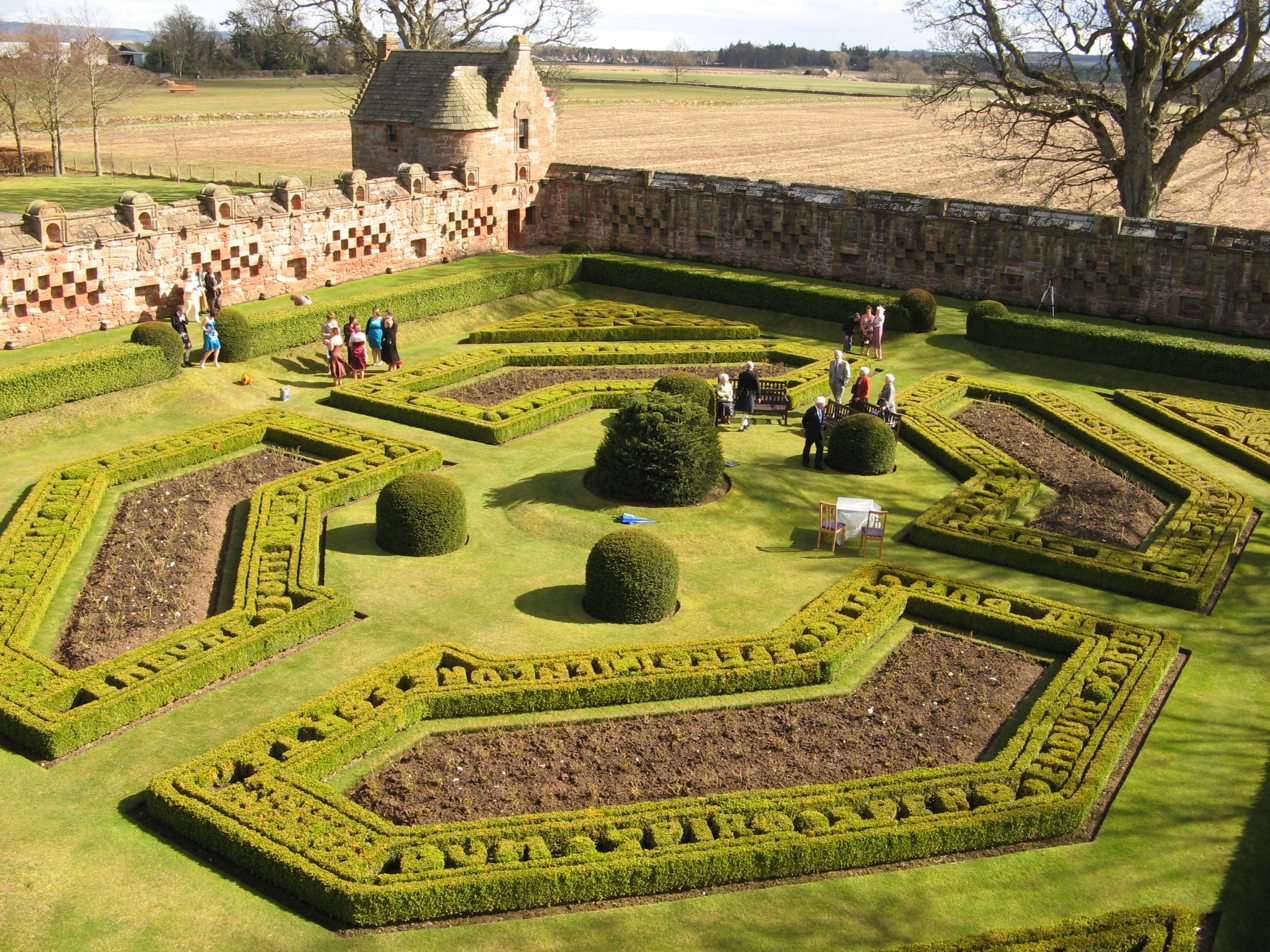
The walled garden, viewed from the upper floor of the tower house

In addition to extending the castle, Sir David Lindsay also created Edzell's most unusual feature, the walled garden, or "Pleasaunce". Similar gardens were probably relatively common in Scotland during the Renaissance, but Edzell is a rare survivor. The garden would have provided a retreat from the castle, and was intended to delight, entertain, and instruct Sir David's distinguished guests. It was started around 1604, and shows signs of being hastily completed at his death in 1610.

It is a rectangular enclosure some 52 metres (171 ft) north to south, and 43.5 metres (143 ft) east to west, surrounded by a 3.6 metres (12 ft) high wall. The north wall is part of the castle courtyard, but the remaining three are intricately decorated. The walls are divided by pilasters (now removed) into regular sections, or compartments, each 3 metres (9.8 ft) across. Each compartment has a niche above, possibly once containing statues. Those on the east wall have semi-circular pediments carved with scrolls, and with the national symbols of thistle, fleur-de-lis, shamrock and rose, recalling the Union of the Crowns of England and Scotland, under James VI in 1603. These motifs were employed on several Jacobean Scottish plaster ceilings, but the Edzell examples are the earliest.

The pediments on the south wall are square, while there are no niches on the west wall, indicating that work may have prematurely come to a halt on Sir David's death. Below the niches, the compartments are of alternating design. Three sets of seven carved panels occupy every other compartment. Between them, the walls are decorated with a representation of the Lindsay coat of arms, with eleven recesses in the form of a fess chequy, or chequered band, surmounted by three seven-pointed stars, taken from the Stirling of Glenesk arms. Several spaces within the walls, including inside the stars, may have been intended as nesting holes for birds.

=== The carved panels ===
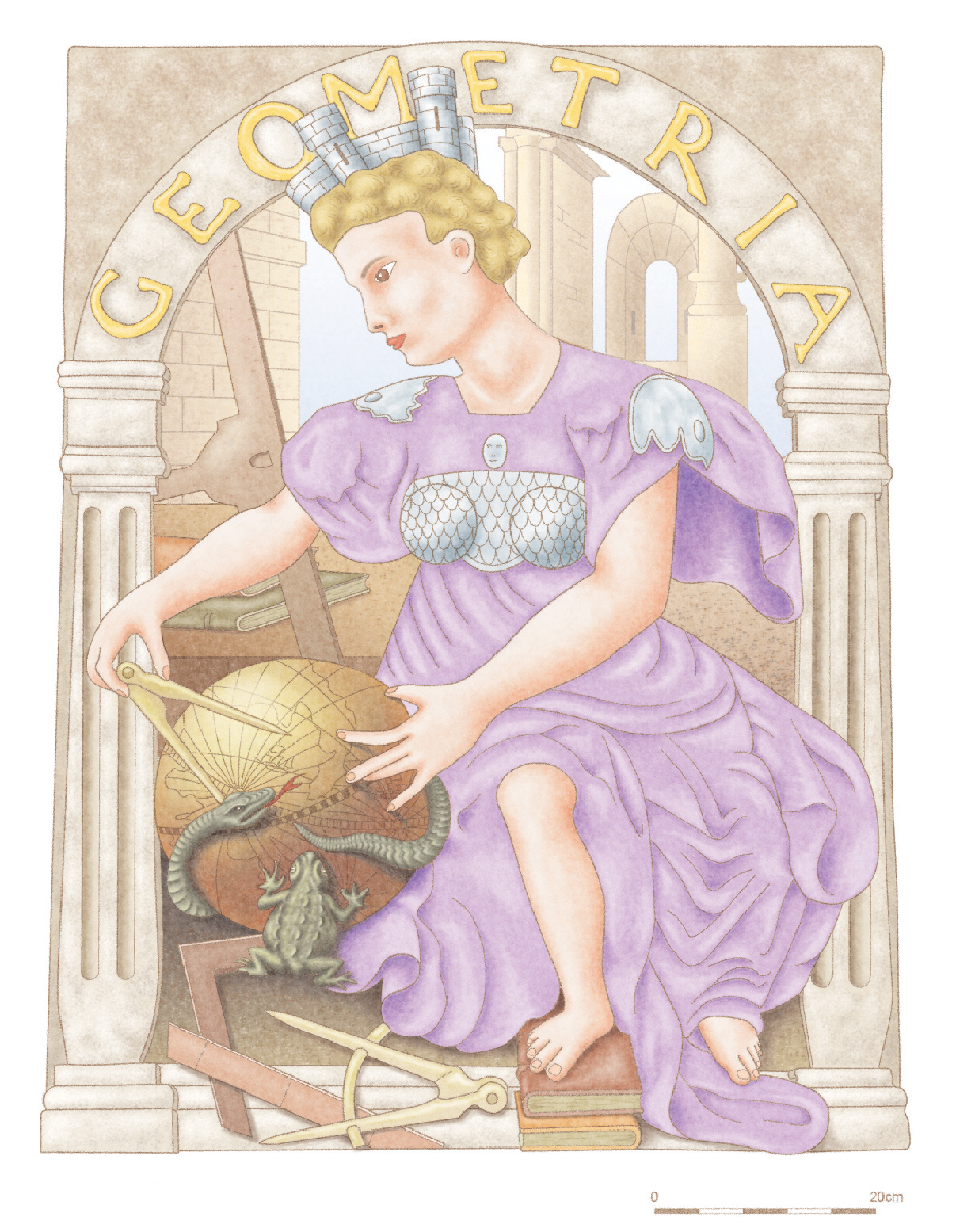
Reconstruction drawing of Geometria, using information from Jan Sadeler's engraving, upon which the original stone carving was based. Image created by Thomas Small.

The sets of carved panels depict the seven Cardinal Virtues on the west wall, the seven Liberal Arts to the south, and the seven Planetary Deities on the east wall. Each panel is approximately 1 metre (3.3 ft) high by 60–75 cm (2-2½ ft) wide. The deities are depicted in vesica-shaped (elliptical) frames, the arts under arches, and the virtues in plain rectangles. W. Douglas Simpson describes the arts panels as the weakest set of carvings, again suggesting money was short for the west wall. He declared the arts panels to be the finest work, and compares the style of the deities to contemporary carvings found in Aberdeenshire, suggesting that the mason responsible may have come from there.

The carvings are all based on popular series of engravings, which were often published in pattern books. Nuremberg was the origin of numerous such books, and one may have been brought to Edzell by the miner Hans Ziegler. Specifically, the images of the deities are derived from engravings of 1528–29 by the German artist Georg Pencz (or Iorg Bentz, c. 1500–1550), a pupil of Albrecht Dürer; the initials I. B. appear on the carving of Mars. The arts and virtues are both based on engravings derived from paintings by the Flemish artist Marten de Vos. The engravings, by Jan Sadeler and Crispijn de Passe, were widely distributed in Scotland, along with those of the deities. Indeed, the image of Prudence is identical to that used by the King's Master of Works William Schaw, in the spectacular display to welcome Queen Anne to Scotland, following her marriage to James VI in 1589.

Planetary Deities

Representations of the seven classical deities, associated with the seven planets known in classical times, appear on the east wall.

- Luna
- Mercury
- Venus
- Sol
- Mars
- Jupiter
- Saturn
Liberal Arts

Figures representing the trivium of subjects (grammar, rhetoric, and logic) which traditionally formed the syllabus of a bachelor's degree, plus the quadrivium which led to a master's degree, are depicted on the south wall.

- Grammatica (grammar), damaged
- Rhetorica (rhetoric)
- Dialectica (argument, or logic)
- Arithmetica (arithmetic)
- Musica (music), damaged
- Geometria (geometry)
- Astronomia (astronomy), missing
Cardinal Virtues

Personifications of the three Christian virtues (trust, hope and charity), plus the four Cardinal virtues of ancient Greece, are carved on the west wall.

- Fides (Faith), damaged
- Spes (hope)
- Caritas (charity)
- Prudentia (prudence)
- Temperantia (temperance)
- Fortitudo (fortitude)
- Justitia (justice)

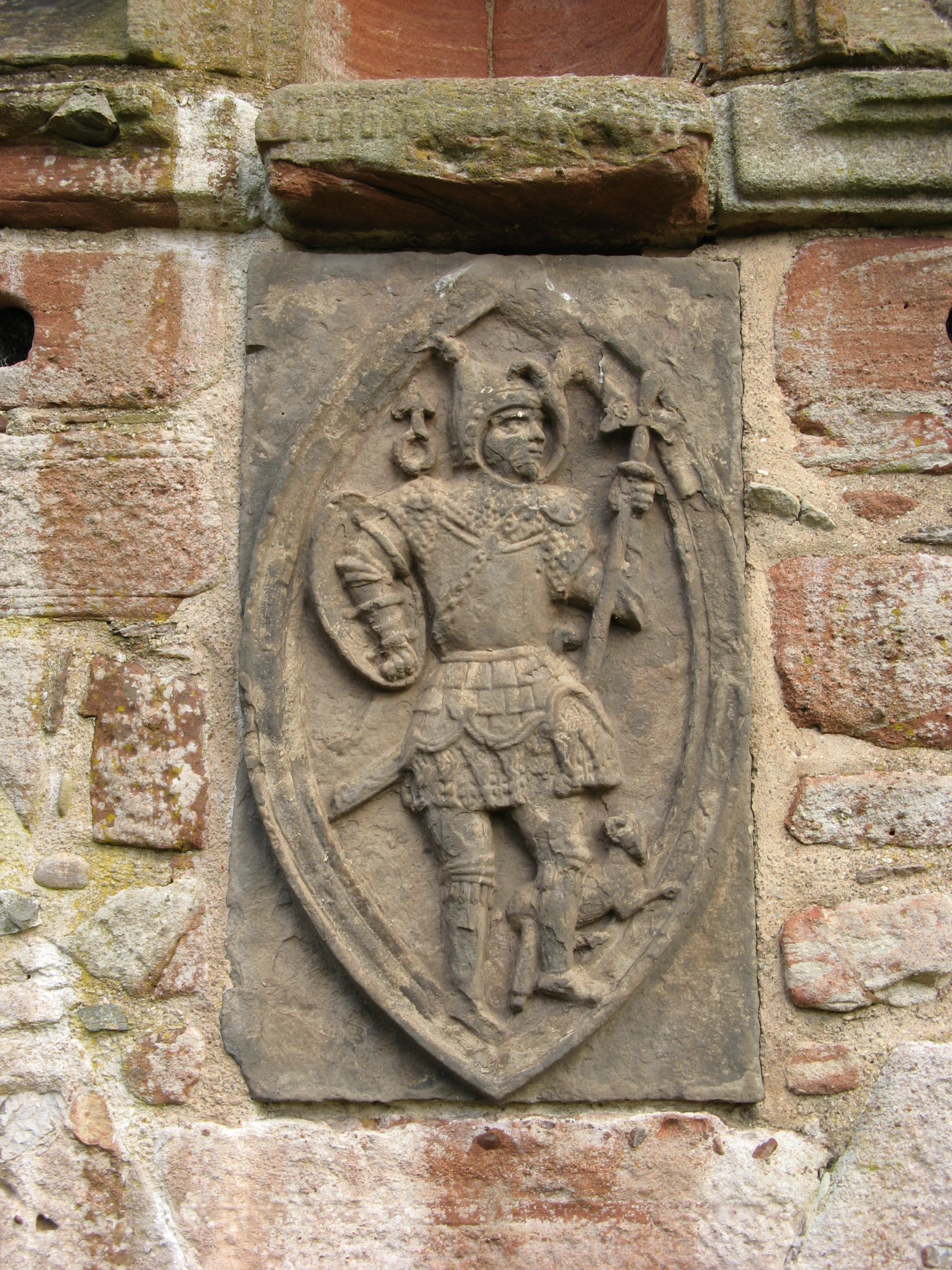
Mars

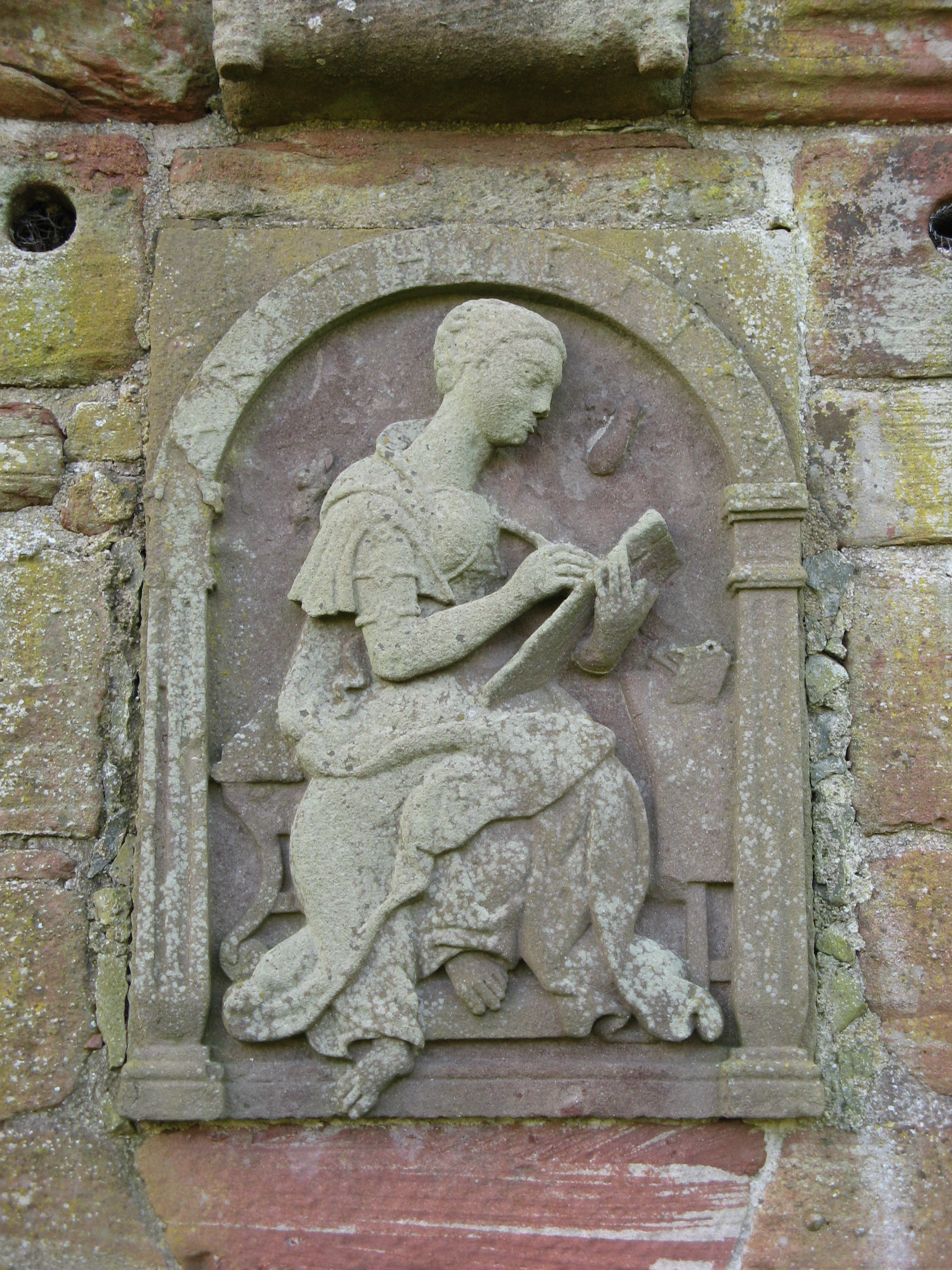
Arithmetica

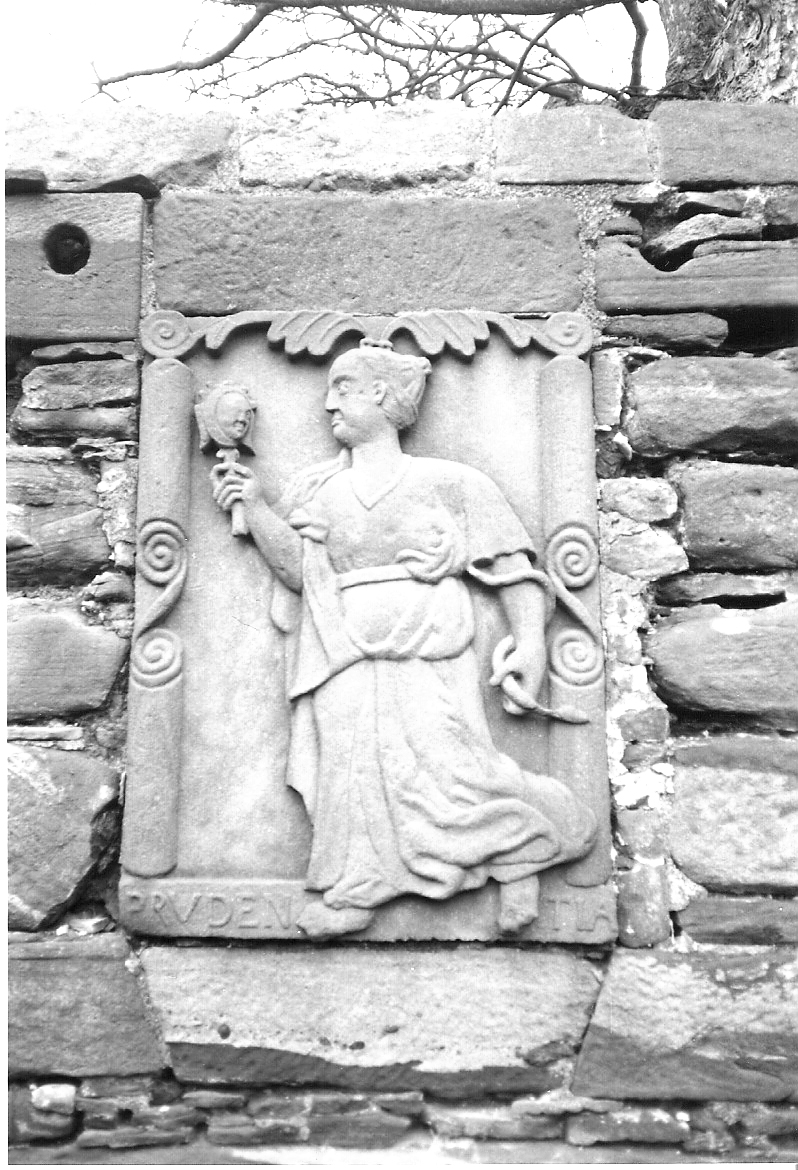
Prudentia

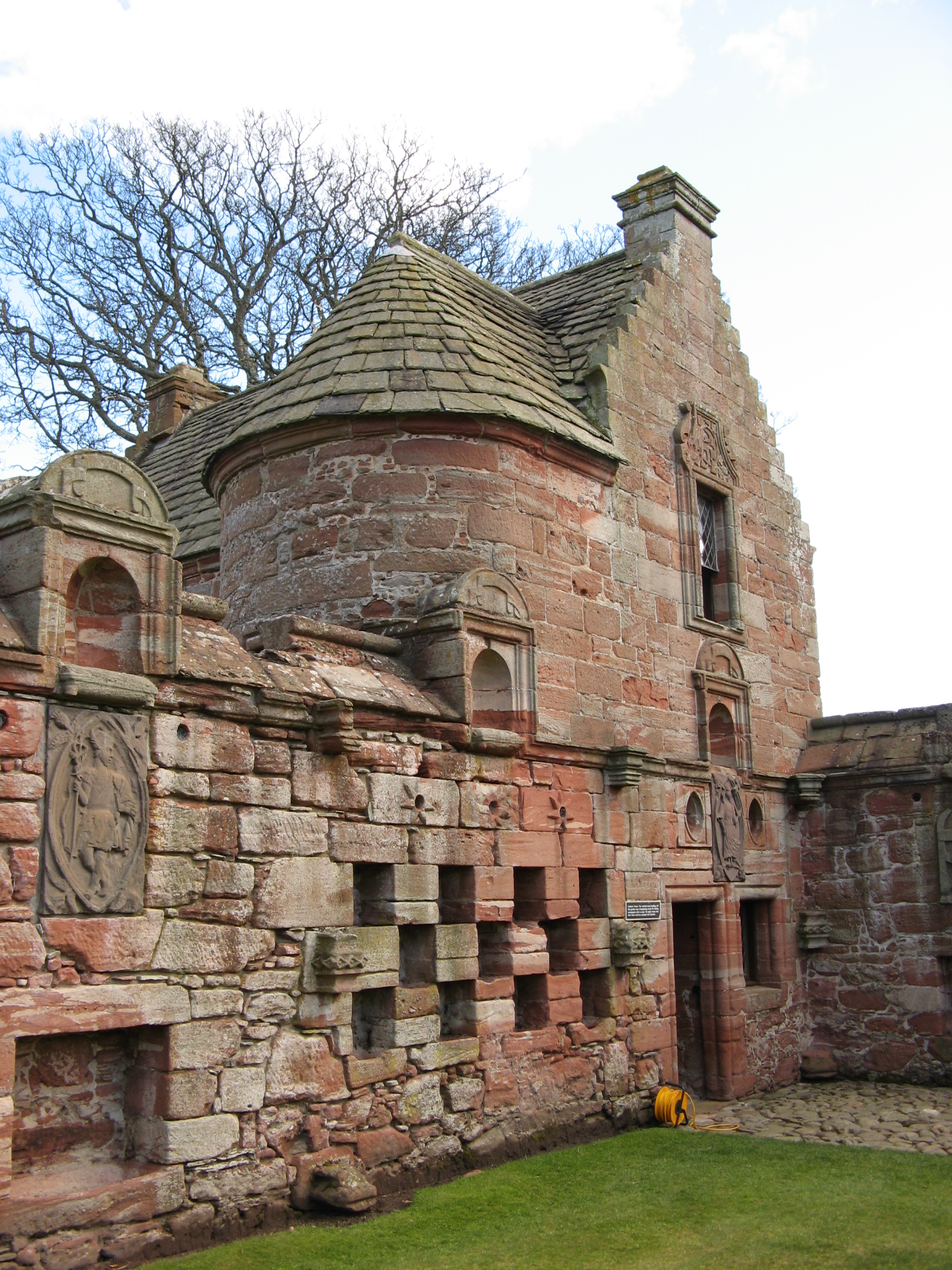
The summer house, showing the decoration on the garden walls

=== Buildings and planting ===
To complement the garden, a bath house and summer house were constructed at the corners of the garden furthest from the castle. The bath house is ruined, but the two-storey summer house survives intact. It comprises a groin-vaulted lower room, with an upper chamber, containing the only surviving example of the castle's carved-oak wall panelling. Charles McKean attributes the design and construction of the garden buildings to Thomas Leiper, an Aberdeenshire stonemason, based on the elaborately decorated gun holes in the summer house.

The planting was recreated in the 1930s. No original plan of the renaissance garden survives, although records show fruit was grown in the 17th century. The garden has decorative hedges, trimmed into the shapes of the Scottish thistle, English rose, and French fleur-de-lis. Further planting is clipped into letters, spelling out the two Lindsay family mottoes, Dum Spiro Spero (while I breathe I hope), and Endure Forte (endure firmly).

=== Interpretations ===
The symbolism of the garden, particularly of the carvings, as well as the repetition of sevens and threes, has inspired many interpretations. The engravings upon which the carvings are based were commonplace in Scotland at the time, and were frequently used in the art of memory, a mnemonic memory technique associated with Freemasonry. The art of memory had become a feature throughout Scottish culture, from the court of Queen Anne, Danish consort of James VI, to the lodges of operative stonemasons. The potential influence of Danish astronomer Tycho Brahe's symbolic garden at Uraniborg, which was visited by James IV of Scotland in 1590, has also been noted.

Sir David Lindsay would have been well aware of the symbolic allusions of the carvings. In correspondence with his brother, Lord Menmuir, he discusses the relationship of the planets to the metals, which he had employed Hans Ziegler to search for on his land. Sir David's nephew, David Lindsay, 1st Lord Balcarres, was noted for his interest in alchemy and the Rosicrucians.

Historian Adam McLean has suggested that the garden is associated with the Rosicrucians, and "should be seen as an early 17th-century Mystery Temple". McLean describes the garden as a place of instruction, and remarks that the whole structure is reminiscent of "Eliphas Levi's description of the ancient Tarot of the Egyptians carved into the walls of their initiation temples, to which the candidate was taken to contemplate the sequence of the symbols". He backs up this suggestion with the observation that the Mantegna Tarocchi, a set of 15th-century engravings formerly thought to be a tarocchi or tarot deck, includes all these images amongst its symbols.
