= Colinsburgh Town Hall =

Municipal building in Colinsburgh, Scotland

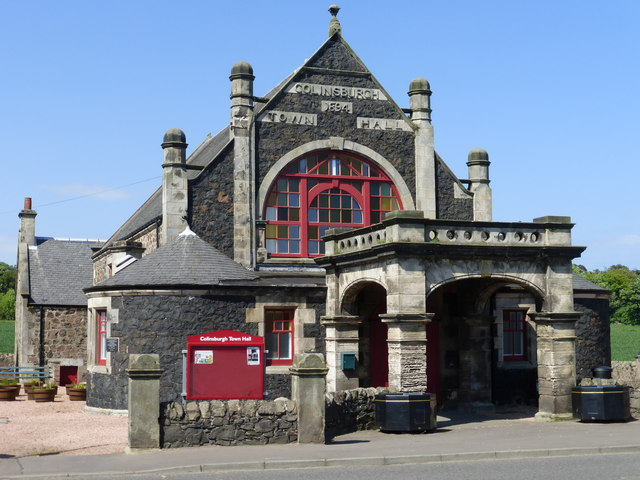
- Colinsburgh Town Hall

- Shown in Fife
- 56.2211°N 2.8437°W
- Location: Main Street, Colinsburgh

History
- Built: 1895

Site notes
- Architect(s): Andrew Dewar and Alexander Cumming Dewar
- Architectural style: Free Style

Colinsburgh Town Hall is a municipal building in Main Street, Colinsburgh, Fife, Scotland. The building is used as a community events venue.

== History ==
For most of the 19th century, community events in Colinsburgh were held in the local school, but, in the early 1880s, the artist, Lady Caroline Coutts Lindsay, led an initiative to establish a dedicated town hall. The initiative gathered pace when Captain James Scott-Davidson of Cairnie took charge of fundraising and secured a significant contribution from Eudoxie, Countess of Lindsay, who, with her husband, John Trotter Bethune, 10th Earl of Lindsay, lived at Kilconquhar House. The site they chose for the new town hall in Main Street was occupied by the Countess of Lindsay's sewing school.

Construction on the new building started in 1894. It was designed by Andrew Dewar and Alexander Cumming Dewar of the Edinburgh architectural practice of A. and A. C. Dewar, built in black basalt whinstone with ashlar dressings and was officially opened by James Lindsay, 26th Earl of Crawford, whose seat was at Balcarres House, on 25 October 1895. The design involved a symmetrical main frontage of thee bays facing Main Street. The central bay featured a prominent porte-cochère formed by square Doric order columns supporting segmental archways with voussoirs and keystones surmounted by a parapet. On the first floor, there was a large Diocletian window, also with voussoirs and a keystone, flanked by pilasters with finials and surmounted by a gable containing the inscription "Colinsburgh 1894 Town Hall". The outer bays took the form of single storey circular structures with conical roofs. Internally, the principal room was the main assembly hall which was well-lit by the Diocletian window.

A central heating system was installed in the building in 1904. The building was brought under the management of the Colinsburgh Town Hall Management Committee which was formed in 1966, and then continued to serve as a community events venue for Colinsburgh through the remainder of the 20th century and into the 21st century. A programme of works to refurbish the town hall and to remodel it internally was carried out with financial support from the National Lottery Community Fund and was completed in 2011. Then the windows were replaced, also with financial support from the National Lottery Community Fund, in 2018.
