= David Lindsay, 8th Earl of Crawford =

David Lindsay, 8th Earl of Crawford (died 27 November 1542) was the son of Alexander Lindsay, 7th Earl of Crawford. He was a member of Clan Lindsay, a Scottish Lowland clan. He married Elizabeth Hay, daughter of William Hay, 3rd Earl of Erroll.

== Succession and penalty ==
In May 1532, the Lords of Council found that the seventh earl had been improperly served after the battle of Flodden and that the eighth earl's title was consequently invalid. This resulted in the pursuit eighth earl for non-entry and associated fees dating back to 1513, leaving the estate vulnerable and at the disposal of the crown. Although he was able to reach a settlement with the crown, this commitment placed a serious financial burden on his estate. He was obliged to sell some of his lands and mortgage much of the rest.

His son, Alexander Lindsay, Master of Crawford, the "Wicked Master", attacked and imprisoned his father and other members of the Lindsay family and, as a consequence of his delinquent behaviour, was disinherited in 1537. He died in a brawl in Dundee in 1542. The 8th Earl chose who would succeed him to the Earldom of Crawford – David Lindsay of Edzell, a distant cousin who was descended from the 3rd Earl. James V set a penalty of 100,000 merks for this transaction, so that earldom would come back to the crown. The 9th Earl, Lindsay of Edzell, then chose to leave the earldom, not to his own sons, but to the son of the Wicked Master of Crawford, another David Lindsay. So the 8th earl's grandson became Master of Crawford in 1546. A modern historian Jamie Cameron argued that this outcome was envisaged by James V when he set the penalty, so that the heirs of the Wicked Master were not excluded from the earldom. The sequence of events and size of the penalty has been used by other writers as evidence of the greed of James V and Regent Arran.

Peerage of Scotland
Preceded by Alexander Lindsay, 7th Earl of Crawford	Earl of Crawford; 1513–1542	Succeeded by David Lindsay
