= David Lindsay, 10th Earl of Crawford =

Scottish landowner

David Lindsay, 10th Earl of Crawford (1527–1574) was a Scottish landowner.

Lindsay was the son of Alexander Lindsay, Master of Crawford (d. 1541) and Jean Sinclair, daughter of Henry Sinclair, 3rd Lord Sinclair (d. 1513).

Lindsay was a grandson of David Lindsay, 8th Earl of Crawford.

He gained the title Earl of Crawford on the death of his third cousin, once removed, David Lindsay, 9th Earl of Crawford in 1558.

Lindsay became an enemy of Mary, Queen of Scots. He was involved in the murder of David Rizzio. In December 1568 he came to Hampton Court to testify against Mary, and sent a challenge to Lord Herries, who was said to have asserted that Regent Moray was guilty of the death of Lord Darnley.

== Family ==
Lindsay married Margaret Beaton, a daughter of David Beaton, Archbishop of St Andrews and Marion Ogilvy, at Finavon Castle in 1546. Their children included:

- David Lindsay, 11th Earl of Crawford
- Alexander Lindsay, 1st Lord Spynie (d. 1607).
- Henry Lindsay, 13th Earl of Crawford (d. 1623), who was master of the household to Anne of Denmark.
- Helen Lindsay, who married Sir David Lindsay of Edzell Castle.
- Sir John Lindsay of Ballinscho or Ballinshoe.
- Sir James Lindsay, who acted as an intermediary between the pope and King James in 1603–4.

Peerage of Scotland
Preceded by David Lindsay	Earl of Crawford; 1558–1574	Succeeded by David Lindsay
