= Earl of Balcarres =

Title in Peerage of Scotland

Earldom of Balcarres
- Quarterly, 1st & 4th: Gules, a fess chequy argent and azure (for Clan Lindsay); 2nd & 3rd: Or a lion rampant gules surmounted of a bend sable (for Abernethy) within a bordure azure powdered with 14 stars or (for Lindsay of Balcarres)
- Creation date: 9 January 1651
- Created by: Charles II
- Peerage: Peerage of Scotland
- First holder: Alexander Lindsay, 2nd Lord Balcarres
- Present holder: Anthony Lindsay, 30th Earl of Crawford
- Heir apparent: Alexander Thomas Lindsay, Lord Balniel
- Remainder to: The 1st Earl's heirs male bearing the name Lindsay
- Subsidiary titles: Lord Lindsay of Balcarres; Lord Lindsay of Balneil
- Status: Extant
- Seat: Balcarres House
- Motto: Astra castra, numen, lumen munimen ("The stars my camp, and God my light and strength")

Earl of Balcarres is a title in the Peerage of Scotland, created in 1651 for Alexander Lindsay, 2nd Lord Balcarres. Since 1848, the title has been held jointly with the Earldom of Crawford, and the holder is also the hereditary clan chief of Clan Lindsay.

The first earl's father was created Lord Lindsay of Balcarres on 27 June 1633. He was the grandson of the 9th Earl of Crawford. The second Lord Lindsay succeeded his father in 1642. A prominent supporter of Charles I, he was further elevated as Earl of Balcarres and Lord Lindsay of Balneil in 1651. During the rule of Oliver Cromwell, the first earl died in exile in Breda in 1659.

He was succeeded by Charles, his third but first surviving son, who in turn was succeeded by his younger brother, the third earl. In his youth, the third earl was a courtier of King Charles II after the restoration of the monarchy, but later became devoted to King James VII. He fled to Château de Saint-Germain-en-Laye after the Glorious Revolution when it was discovered he was part of a plot to restore James to the English throne. He returned to Scotland around 1701 and was received at the court of Queen Anne. He was stripped of his annuity during the revolution, but not his titles.

In January 1808, the ancient Earldom of Crawford, held by members of another branch of the Lindsay family since 1398, became dormant after the death of the George Lindsay-Crawford, 22nd Earl of Crawford. In 1843, James Lindsay, 7th Earl of Balcarres, put forward his claim, based on the research of his eldest son Alexander. In 1848, the House of Lords allowed the claim. It was held that the seventh Earl's father, the sixth Earl, was the lawful (de jure) successor to the earldom of Crawford (though he did not claim it). Therefore, the sixth Earl of Balcarres was posthumously declared the twenty-third Earl of Crawford, and his son, the seventh Earl of Balcarres, became the twenty-fourth Earl of Crawford. Thereafter, the two earldoms have remained united.

The family seat is Balcarres House, near Colinsburgh, Fife.

== Lords Lindsay of Balcarres (1633) ==
- David Lindsay, 1st Lord Balcarres (1587–1642)
- Alexander Lindsay, 2nd Lord Balcarres (1618–1659), created Earl of Balcarres in 1651

== Earls of Balcarres (1651) ==
- Alexander Lindsay, 1st Earl of Balcarres (1618–1659) (Anna Mackenzie, Countess of Balcarres)
- Charles Lindsay, 2nd Earl of Balcarres (1650–1662)
- Colin Lindsay, 3rd Earl of Balcarres (1652–1722)
- Alexander Lindsay, 4th Earl of Balcarres (d. 1736)
- James Lindsay, 5th Earl of Balcarres (1691–1768)
- Alexander Lindsay, 6th Earl of Balcarres (1752–1825), de jure 23rd Earl of Crawford (unclaimed)
- James Lindsay, 7th Earl of Balcarres (1783–1869), declared 24th Earl of Crawford in 1848

See Earl of Crawford for the remaining Earls of Balcarres

== See also ==
- Lindsay family tree, showing the relationship between some of the above
