= Katherine Campbell, Countess of Crawford =

Scottish noblewoman

- Born: 1517
- Died: 1578 (aged 60–61)
- Occupation: noble
- Spouse(s): James Ogilvy; David Lindsay, 9th Earl of Crawford
- Children: 12

Katherine Campbell, Countess of Crawford born Katherine Campbell (1517 – 1578) was a Scottish noblewoman. She married twice and controlled a substantial inheritance.

== Life ==
Her parents were Muriel (born Calder) and Sir John Campbell, 1st of Cawdor.

She had been a companion to Mary of Guise.

Her first husband was James Ogilvy, Master of Ogilvy, whom she married on 1 October 1539. They had five children including Agnes Ogilvy, who married John Erskine of Dun, and James Ogilvy who later became the 5th Lord Ogilvy of Airlie. Katherine's husband died at the Battle of Pinkie near Musselburgh in 1547. During that battle the Scots were defeated by an English army. She had the care of her children and she was able to act to their benefit.

Her second husband was David Lindsay, 9th Earl of Crawford. He had been married before to Janet Gray, daughter of Patrick Gray, Master of Gray, and Annabella Forbes. They married before 12 November 1550, and with him she had seven children.

David Lindsay, Earl of Crawford died at Invermark Castle in 1558. Thereafter Katherine Campbell lived at Edzell Castle, Brechin Castle, and the Crawford lodging in Dundee. When Mary, Queen of Scots, was travelling south from Aberdeen in September 1564 she sent a letter asking the Countess of Crawford to make provisions for her.

Katherine Campbell died at Brechin Castle on 17 September 1578. Her will mentions a silver bowl bought for her in Paris when she was a companion of Mary of Guise. She left a bed of green stemming embroidered with black velvet and white silk to Sir David Lindsay of Edzell. She left a bed of cloth of gold with curtains of varying colour taffeta with fringes of crimson and yellow silk to Lord Ogilvy. To her daughter Margaret, she left a black velvet gown trimmed with ermine, with a purple damask skirt. She left to Helen Ogilvy, Lady Inverquharity younger, a daughter from her first marriage, 300 merks for her grandchildren. To her daughter Agnes Ogilvy, Lady Dun younger, a gold chained pledged for the lands of Inverquharity and black damask to make a new gown from fabric she had bought for clothes for herself.

Elizabeth Lindsay, Lady Drummond, her daughter, was to have her gold bracelets with white enamel work and a black velvet gown with borders of embroidered satin. Margaret Forbes, if she married, was to have 200 merks, and Katherine Campbell recommended that she be brought up by her sister Janet Campbell, Lady Lovat.

== Children ==
She had three sons and two daughters during her first marriage. Including:

- James Ogilvy, 5th Lord Ogilvy of Airlie, Katherine left him silverwork and three pieces of tapestry by her will.

The seven children from her second marriage included:

- John Lindsay of Balcarres, Lord Menmuir.
- Sir David Lindsay of Edzell
- Walter Lindsay of Balgavie
- Elizabeth Lindsay (d. 1585), who married Patrick Drummond, 3rd Lord Drummond.
- Margaret Lindsay, who married John Stewart, 6th Lord Innermeath (d. 1603) who was made Earl of Atholl in 1596.
