= Anthony Lindsay, 30th Earl of Crawford =

Scottish nobleman and clan chief

The Right Honourable The Earl of Crawford
- 30th Earl of Crawford and 13th Earl of Balcarres
- Tenure: 2023–present
- Predecessor: 29th Earl of Crawford and 12th Earl of Balcarres
- Other titles: Lord Balniel (1975–2023)
- Born: Anthony Robert Lindsay; 24 November 1958 (age 67)
- Residence: Balcarres House, nr. Fife, Scotland
- Offices: Chief of Clan Lindsay
- Spouse: Nicola Bicket (m. 1989)
- Issue: 4
- Heir: Alexander Lindsay, Lord Balniel
- Parents: Robert Lindsay, 29th Earl of Crawford; Ruth Meyer-Bechtler
- Occupation: Investment banker

Anthony Robert Lindsay, 30th Earl of Crawford and 13th Earl of Balcarres (born 24 November 1958), styled Lord Balniel between 1975 and 2023, is a Scottish peer and Chief of Clan Lindsay.

== Life ==
Lindsay was born on 24 November 1958, the son of Robert Alexander Lindsay, 29th Earl of Crawford, and Ruth Beatrice Meyer-Bechtler. He was educated at Eton College and at the University of Edinburgh.

Lindsay works as an investment banker in London. In 2020, Lindsay and golf course designer Clive Clark opened Dumbarnie Links on the grounds of the Balcarres Estate.

Following his father's death on 18 March 2023 he became Earl of Crawford and Chief of Clan Lindsay. The earldom is one of the most ancient titles in Great Britain. He acted as Deputy to the Great Steward of Scotland at the coronation of Charles III and Camilla in 2023.

== Family ==
He married Nicola A. Bicket, daughter of Captain Antony Neilson Bicket, on 12 August 1989. They have four children. His eldest son Alexander, Lord Balniel, is heir apparent to the earldom.

== Arms ==
Coat of arms of Anthony Lindsay, 30th Earl of Crawford
Notes Crest A Swan's Head neck and wings Proper issuing from an antique Ducal-coronet Or Escutcheon Quarterly, 1st and 4th, Gules a Fess chequy Argent and Azure (Lindsay), 2nd and 3rd, Or a Lion rampant Gules debruised of a ribbon in bend Sable (Abernethy) Supporters Two Lions rampant guardant Gules armed and langued Azure Motto Endure fort (En: Endure bravely)

Peerage of Scotland
Preceded by Robert Lindsay	Earl of Crawford; 2023–present	Incumbent
Preceded by Robert Lindsay	Earl of Balcarres; 2023–present	Incumbent
