= William Murray, 2nd Earl of Tullibardine =

Scottish peer

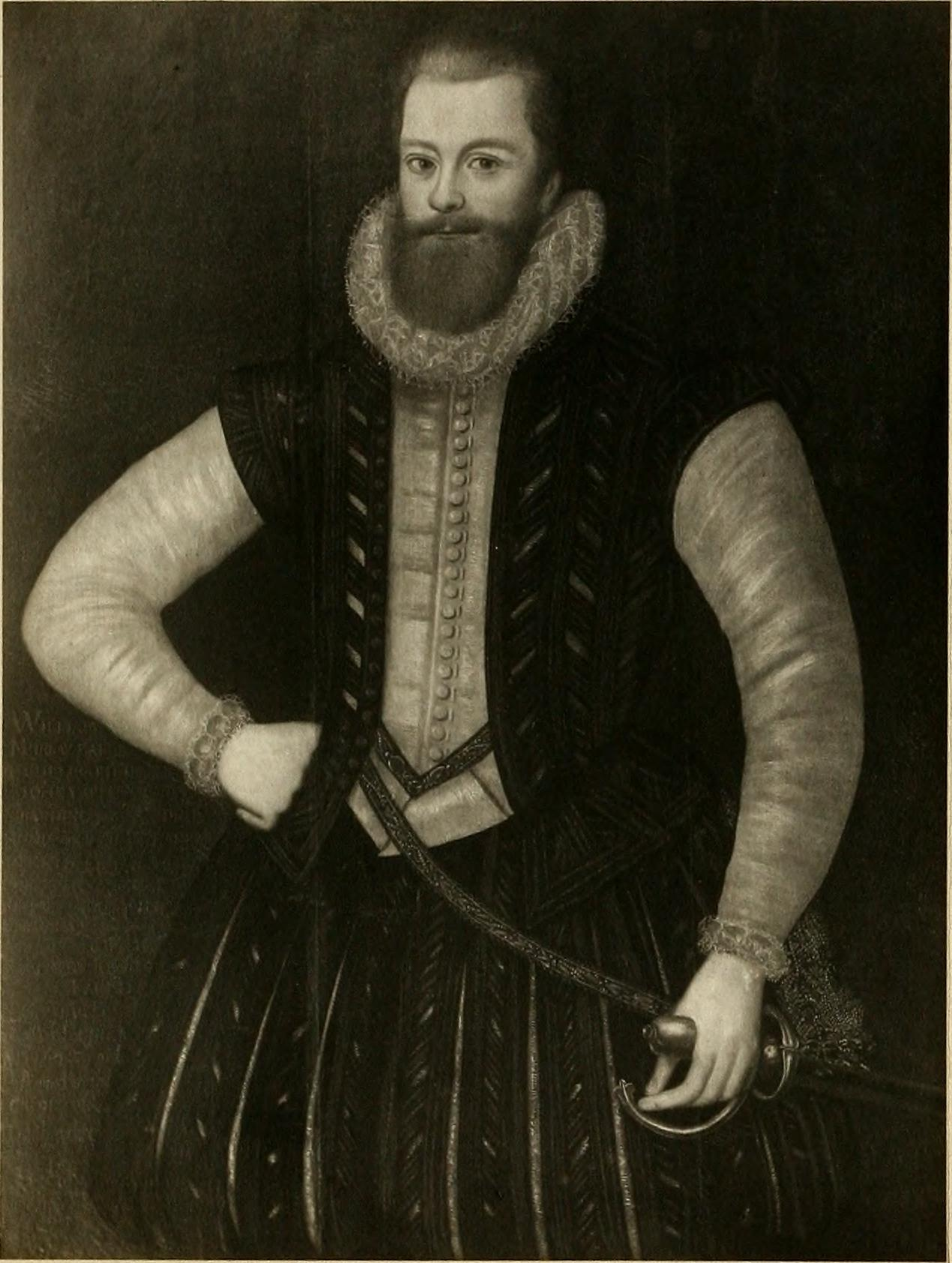
William Murray, 2nd Earl of Tullibardine

William Murray, 2nd Earl of Tullibardine (c. 1574–1626) was a Scottish landowner and courtier.

He was the son of John Murray, 1st Earl of Tullibardine, and Catherine Drummond, daughter of David, 2nd Lord Drummond.

He travelled abroad in 1594 to learn languages, first going to London with James Drummond of Innerpeffray, and William Drummond, with a passport from the English ambassador Robert Bowes. According to the English diplomat George Nicholson, while at Perth in August 1601, James VI appointed William Murray and James Drummond of Inchaffray as servants in his chamber.

At the Union of Crowns in 1603, William Murray came to London. Lady Anne Clifford wrote that in July 1603, "Now was the Master of Orkney and the Lord Tullibardine much in love in Mrs Cary and came thither [to Norbury, where they were isolated because of illness] to see us with George Murray in their company who was one of the King's bedchamber."

In 1608 he plotted with his brother-in-law John Grant of Freuchie and Mr James Stewart, Commissary of Dunkeld, to help the Earl of Atholl escape from Edinburgh Castle.

In 1616 he had a warrant to arrest Robert Crichton of Cluny. His men caught up with him in St Cuthbert's in Edinburgh and they fought in the church.

On 14 March 1617 King James wrote to him from Whitehall Palace requesting his help preparing for his visit to Scotland. James wanted capercaillies and ptarmigans sent to Durham and to other stops on his way to Berwick-upon-Tweed, as examples of rare and precious Scottish cuisine.

== Family ==
Murray married firstly in 1599 Cecilia Wemyss, daughter of Sir John Wemyss. It has been suggested that a sonnet by the king, Nocht Orientall Christall Streemes, was addressed to Cecilia.

His second wife, who he married in 1604, Dorothea Stewart, was the daughter of John Stewart, 5th Earl of Atholl, and Marie Ruthven. Their children included:

- Mary Murray, who married Sir John Moncrieffe of Moncrieffe.
- John Murray (d. 1642) became Earl of Tullibardine in 1626 and Earl of Atholl in 1629.

Peerage of Scotland
Preceded by John Murray	Earl of Tullibardine; 1613–1626	Resigned
