= John Stewart, 5th Earl of Atholl =

Scottish landowner

John Stewart
- Born: c. 1563
- Died: September 1595
- Known for: Being the last directly inherited Earl of Atholl

John Stewart, 5th Earl of Atholl, (1563–1595) was a Scottish landowner.

John Stewart was the son of John Stewart, 4th Earl of Atholl and Margaret Fleming, daughter of Malcolm Fleming, 3rd Lord Fleming and Janet Stewart.

In 1578 he married Marie or Mary Ruthven, daughter of William Ruthven, 1st Earl of Gowrie and Dorothea Stewart. On 14 November 1578 she wrote as "Marie Countas of Atholl" to Barbara Stewart, Lady Weem, the wife of James Menzies of Weem and her husband's aunt, to invite her to Cupar to describe to her the fashion and manners of a place where she intended to travel.

He rescued the widowed Agnes Sinclair Countess of Erroll in October 1587. She had been violently abducted from her house at Inchestuthill and assaulted by Colin Campbell of Glenlyon and his followers.

He was involved in a quarrel with the Earl of Erroll at Perth on 29 June 1591, when Anne of Denmark made a ceremonial entry to the town. Atholl was Provost of Perth and Errol was Constable and they argued over their precedence.

Atholl and his wife became friends with Anne of Denmark and while they were at Falkland Palace invited her stay with them at Dunkeld in July 1592. James VI of Scotland after some hesitation would not allow her to make the trip. Anne was unhappy at this and wished she was back home in Denmark with her mother Sophie. There were suspicions that the Earl had been involved in the rebel Francis Stewart's assault on Falkland Palace in June. The English ambassador Robert Bowes wrote that Atholl had "his spoon deep in the late pie at Falkland".

The English diplomat Robert Bowes hoped that they would persuade Marie's sister Margaret Ruthven to marry the son of the Master of Forbes. This would weaken the power of the Earl of Huntly. However, Margaret married John Graham, 4th Earl of Montrose.

Atholl died in September 1595 and was buried at Dunkeld on 11 October. Anne of Denmark was in Perth and saw the funeral procession from William Hall's house. There were rumours he had been poisoned.

== The earldom of Atholl after his death ==
On his death in 1595 Atholl left four daughters, Dorothea, Mary, Jean, and Anne, but no male heir. Two sons had died in infancy. The Atholl earldom reverted to the crown by "non-entry" and, with the rights to award the marriages of the daughters, was given by James VI to Anne of Denmark on 1 September 1595.

There was much discussion about the earldom. Anne of Denmark was thought to claim it for herself or for her son Prince Henry. The Earl of Orkney requested it, as compensation for his expenses at court in 1594.

In March 1596 John Stewart 6th Lord Innermeath married the earl's widow Marie Ruthven and in May 1596 he was newly created Earl of Atholl, after the countess had bought back the rights to the earldom for £10,000 Scots.

Marie Ruthven and her new husband arrested Agnes McCawis and Bessie Ireland as suspected witches. The two women accused two more women from Dunkeld of witchcraft, Margaret Stewart and Isobel Douglas, who complained of their unjust imprisonment to the Privy Council of Scotland. Marie Ruthven and the Earl were ordered to bring the four women to Edinburgh. According to the Chronicle of Perth, Bessie Ireland, Jonet Robertson, and Marion McCauss were burnt on the South Inch on 9 September 1597.

John's daughter Dorothea Stewart married William Murray, 2nd Earl of Tullibardine, and their son John became Earl of Atholl in 1629.

Peerage of Scotland
Preceded by John Stewart	Earl of Atholl; 1579–1595	Extinct
