= Balcarres House =

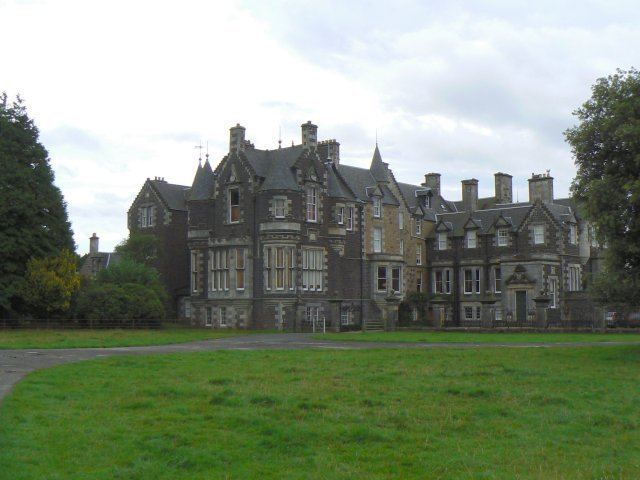
- West façade of Balcarres House

- Location in Fife
- 56.2292°N 2.8499°W

History
- Built: 1595
- Built for: John Lindsay of Balcarres

Site notes
- Architect(s): William Burn, David Bryce (19th century additions)
- Owner: Anthony, Earl of Crawford and Balcarres

Listed Building – Category A
- Designated: 1 February 1972
- Reference no.: LB8625

Inventory of Gardens and Designed Landscapes in Scotland
- Official name: Balcarres
- Designated: 31 March 2005
- Reference no.: GDL00036

Balcarres House lies 1 km north of the village of Colinsburgh, in the East Neuk of Fife, in eastern Scotland. It is centred on a mansion built in 1595 by John Lindsay (1552–1598), second son of David, 9th Earl of Crawford. The house became the family seat of the Earl of Crawford. The present house is the result of substantial extensions in the early nineteenth century, using part of a fortune made in India, but preserves much of the original mansion.

Balcarres House is protected as a category A listed building, and the grounds are included on the Inventory of Gardens and Designed Landscapes in Scotland, the national listing of significant gardens.

== Location ==
The house is in southeast Fife, south of the A915, between Largoward and Colinsburgh about 3 miles (4.8 km) from the coast. The nearest town is St Andrews, to the east.

It commands a view southwards to the Firth of Forth and beyond to Lothian on the opposite shore of the estuary. On a clear day, the skyline of Edinburgh may be seen, 20 miles (32 km) away.

== History ==
The name Balcarres comes from the Gaelic baile carrach, meaning rough or stony settlement.

The house was founded in 1511 by Sir John Stirling of Keir, having acquired the lands from the Scottish Crown upon strict condition of building certain structures and cultivating the land. The L-plan house which he constructed still survives in the centre of the much-extended house.

In 1587, the house was acquired from Sir John Stirling by John Lindsay, Lord Menmuir (1552–1598), second son of the 9th Earl of Crawford. He also acquired other lands in Fife, which were created into a barony in 1592. He built the original mansion in 1595, three years before his death. This original building was plain in design. It comprised a Z-plan tower house, which itself incorporated an earlier turret. This earlier tower had been built by Sir John Stirling of Keir around 1511.

In 1633, King Charles I bestowed the title of "Lord Lindsay of Balcarres" on David Lindsay, second son of John Lindsay. David built a small Gothic chapel, and was buried there when he died in 1641. The chapel still stands near the road, but has lost its roof. David's son Alexander was created Earl of Balcarres in 1651. He and his wife, Anna supported the Royalists through the Civil War, dying in exile in Breda in 1659, while Balcarres was sequestered by the Parliamentarians. The Crawfords continued to back the Stuarts, and in 1689 Colin, 3rd Earl of Balcarres, was imprisoned and later exiled as a supporter of the deposed James VII. He was permitted to return to Scotland in 1700, but took part in the failed Jacobite Rising of 1715, and was subsequently placed under house-arrest at Balcarres. He later founded the estate village of Colinsburgh to the south of the house, before his death in 1722.

In 1789, the sixth Earl Alexander, sold Balcarres to his brother, Robert Lindsay, who had acquired a fortune in India. Robert's son Colonel James Lindsay inherited the house in 1836. He commissioned a substantial extension to Balcarres from the architect William Burn, preserving most of the old house within it. His son, Sir Coutts Lindsay, built another extension to the north east, and the terraced gardens, to designs by David Bryce in the 1860s. In April 1886 Sir Coutts sold the estate to his nephew, James Ludovic Lindsay, the ninth Earl of Balcarres and twenty-sixth Earl of Crawford. It remains in the Earl's family.

== Estate ==
To the east of the house there is a crag on which stands a folly. John Blackadder preached at a conventicle on this crag during the 17th-century persecution of the Covenanters. The folly was built around 1820, and comprises a Gothic tower surrounded by mock ruins.

The 17th-century chapel is protected as a scheduled monument. The 17th-century sundial, brought here from Leuchars Castle is also listed at category A. A late 17th or early 18th century dower house also stands in the grounds.

The estate is represented by East Neuk Estates, a joint venture of six local landed families who continue to live on and run their estates, some of which date back to the Medieval era and are still largely agricultural. The other estates are Balcaskie (Anstruther family), Elie House (Nairn baronets), Gilston Estate (Baxter family), Kilconquhar Estate (Lindesay-Bethune family) and Strathtyrum (Cheape family).

== See also ==
- Dumbarnie Links

== Gallery ==
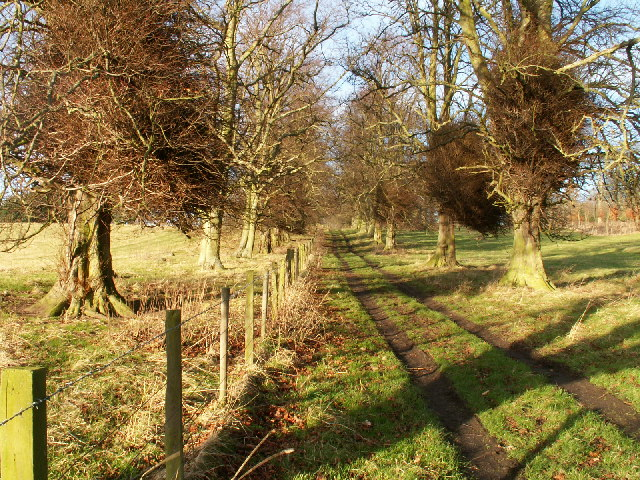
Woodland track heading towards Balcarres house from Colinsburgh.

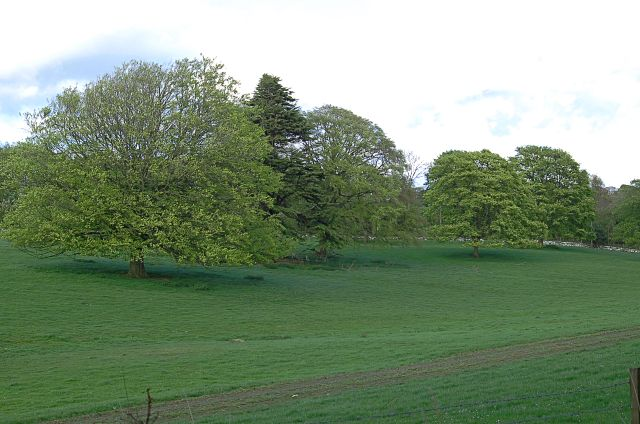
Near Balcarres: Mature trees and a section of the disused drive into Balcarres House

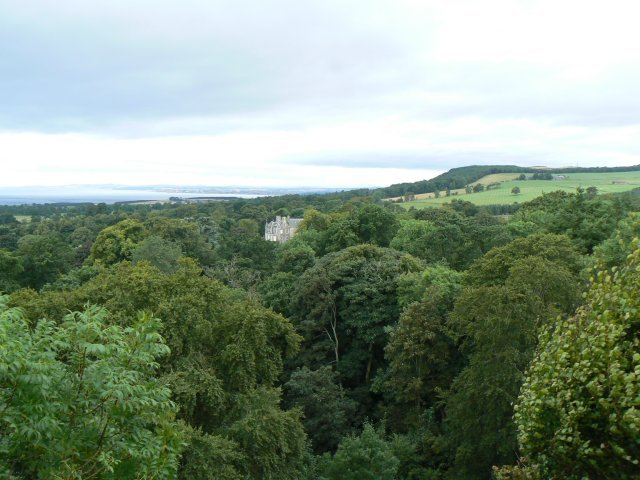
Balcarres House seen from the tower folly on top of Balcarres Craig

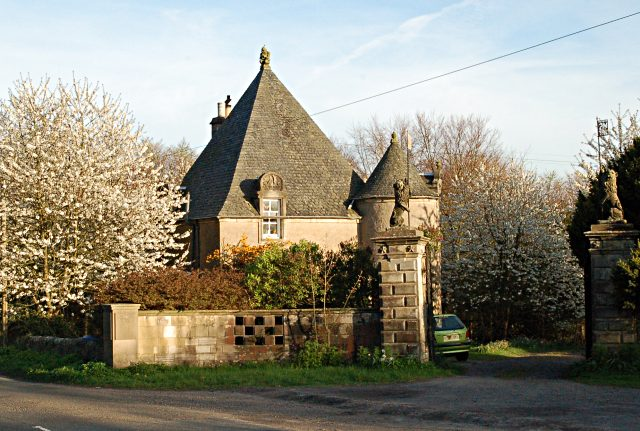
The Balniel gate house to Balcarres House

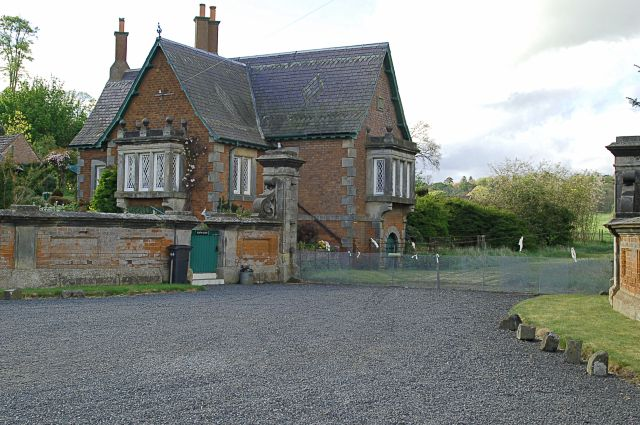
Balcarres Gatehouse, just east of the village

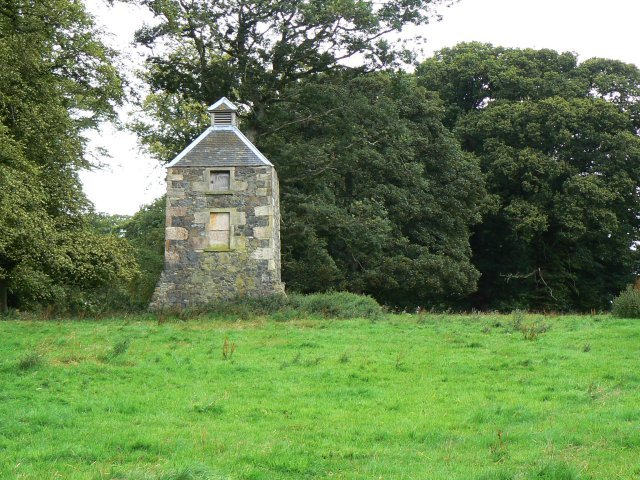
A substantial doocot in the grounds of Balcarres House

== Sources ==
- Chambers, William; Chambers, Robert (1844). "A Pilgrimage to Balcarres". Chambers's Journal (610). Orr and Smith.
- Fleming, D Hay (1886). "Kilconquhar". Guide to the East Neuk of Fife.
