= Patrick Drummond, 3rd Lord Drummond =

Scottish landowner

Patrick Drummond, 3rd Lord Drummond (1550–1600) was a Scottish landowner.

Patrick was the son of David Drummond, 2nd Lord Drummond and Lilias Ruthven (d. 1579), daughter of William Ruthven, 2nd Lord Ruthven and Janet Halyburton, Lady Dirleton.

The English commander in Scotland during the Marian Civil War, William Drury, noted Drummond's activities in April 1572. There was a meeting of nobles in Perth, said to be to discuss the affairs of the young newly married Lord Drummond and his mother, Lilias Ruthven, Lady Drummond. Drury heard the Lords at Perth also intended to band together in a faction, but a quarrel between the Earl of Argyll and Atholl ended this.

Lord Drummond went to France and returned in February 1583.

== Family ==
In 1572, Patrick Drummond married Elisabeth Lindsay (d. 1585), daughter of David Lindsay, 9th Earl of Crawford and Katherine Campbell. Their children included:

- James Drummond, 4th Lord Drummond and 1st Earl of Perth. He accompanied the Earl of Nottingham to Spain in 1604.
- John Drummond, 2nd Earl of Perth, who married Jean Kerr, daughter of Robert Ker, 1st Earl of Roxburghe and Mary Maitland, on 28 August 1613.
- Katherine Drummond, who married 1594 James Leslie, Master of Rothes (d. 1607), their son was John Leslie, 6th Earl of Rothes.
- Lilias Drummond (d. 1601), married Alexander Seton, 1st Earl of Dunfermline.
- Jean Drummond (d. 1643) companion of Anne of Denmark, married 1614 as his second wife Robert Ker, 1st Earl of Roxburghe.
- Elizabeth Drummond, married Alexander Elphinstone, 5th Lord Elphinstone (1577-1648).
- Anne Drummond, mar. (1) Patrick Barclay of Towie, and (2) Andrew Fraser, 1st Lord Fraser.

In 1589 he married Agnes Drummond, widow of Hugh Montgomerie, 3rd Earl of Eglinton and daughter of Sir John Drummond 2nd of Innerpeffray and Margaret Stewart, Lady Gordon.

Peerage of Scotland
Preceded by David Drummond	Lord Drummond; 1571–1600	Succeeded by James Drummond
