= Alexander Lindsay, 1st Earl of Balcarres =

Scottish nobleman and courtier

Arms of Alexander Lindsay: Gules, a fess chequy argent and azure (for Clan Lindsay) all within a bordure azure charged with eight mullets or (difference for Lindsay of Balcarres)

Alexander Lindsay, 1st Earl of Balcarres (6 July 1618 – 30 August 1659) was a Scottish nobleman and courtier.

== Biography ==
Lindsay was the eldest son of David Lindsay, 1st Lord Balcarres, and grandson of John Lindsay, Lord Menmuir. In April 1640, he married Lady Anna Mackenzie (b.1621), daughter of Colin Mackenzie, 1st Earl of Seaforth.

Lindsay succeeded his father as Lord Balcarres in 1641. Originally a strong supporter of the Covenant, having been tutored at the University of St. Andrews by David Forret, he was present at the Battle of Marston Moor in 1644. However, in 1648 he became an Engager seeking an alliance with Charles I, leading to a break with the majority of the Covenanters. Admitted to parliament in 1649 he was appointed a commissioner of the Exchequer in 1650.

He was created Earl of Balcarres on 9 January 1651, with the subsidiary title Lord Lindsay and Balneil, and hereditary governor of Edinburgh Castle in 1651. He visited France to advise the king in 1653 and 1654 and finally resided at the court in exile of Charles II in the Netherlands. Lady Anna served as a governess to Prince William of Orange. Lord Balcarres died at Breda and was succeeded by his son Charles.

== Notes ==
Peerage of Scotland
New creation	Earl of Balcarres; 1651–1659	Succeeded by Charles Lindsay
Preceded by David Lindsay	Lord Lindsay of Balcarres; 1642–1659	Succeeded by Charles Lindsay
