= John Lindsay of Balcarres, Lord Menmuir =

Scottish administrator

John Lindsay of Balcarres (1552–1598) was Secretary of State, Scotland. On 5 July 1581 he was appointed a Lord of Session under the title Lord Menmuir.

== Life ==
He was the second son of David Lindsay, 9th Earl of Crawford and Catherine Campbell, daughter of Sir John Campbell of Lorn. Along with his brother, Lord Edzell, he was sent under the care of James Lawson to complete his education on the continent and in Paris. The French Wars of Religion meant they had to return rapidly from Paris to Dieppe, then moving to the University of Cambridge; however, as there is no record of him in Venn's Alumni Cantabrigienses John may have returned to Paris subsequently.

Menmuir, Lethnot, and Lochlee, in the gift of the Edzell family, were settled on him; later, under a Writ of the Privy Seal, 11 July 1576, various teinds and a pension were also granted, along with the small estate of Drumcairn, in Forfarshire. In 1586, he purchased the lands of Balcarres (near Colinsburgh in Fife), Balniell, Pitcorthie, and others in the county of Fife, which on 10 June 1592 were united into a free barony. In 1595 he erected the mansion of Balcarres House, which he made his principal residence.

Menmuir was an ally in James VI's programme of reforms. In 1587 he was employed in framing several acts of Parliament relating to the constitution. In April 1588, and again in April 1589, he was appointed one of a commission to inquire into disorders in the University of St Andrews. In November 1589 he joined the Privy Council. He acquired political influence chiefly on account of his financial ability. On 14 October 1591 he was appointed one of the four financial managers for the queen consort Anne of Denmark. In June 1592, Menmuir was appointed "Master of Metals", in charge of crown revenues from gold mining and other mineral works.

In July 1593, Menmuir was named one of a special council for the management of the Queen's revenues, In January 1596, he was chosen one of the eight Commissioners of the Exchequer, known as the Octavians. He was reputed the ablest financier of the eight. In March he was appointed Lord Keeper of the Privy Seal, and on 28 May Secretary of State, Scotland for life.

In March 1594, he spoke with Bernard Fechtenburg one of the mining experts of Thomas Foulis and convinced him to work for David Lindsay of Edzell. Fechtenburg said that Edzell's samples of ores were more promising than an assay made by Foulis' other experts. In February 1596, Menmuir was an auditor of Foulis's account of the gold duty and the English subsidy received by James VI.

Menmuir was also one of the chief advisers of the King in his policy for establishing Episcopacy. In 1596 he drew up a scheme for the planting of kirks throughout Scotland with perpetual local stipends, with representation of each presbytery in Parliament by a commissioner. After an attempt to modify it by an Act of the Estates passed in August, but was badly received by the Presbyterian church, he gave up the plan as before its time. Shortly afterwards his lenient attitude towards the Catholic nobles brought him into collision with the kirk. He was with the King when besieged in the Tolbooth on 17 December 1596, and he was attacked as a 'plain mocker of religion'. Menmuir drew up the 55 points to be submitted to the General Assembly which met at Perth on 28 February 1597. He was the Chancellor of the University of St Andrews from 1597 to 1598.

Besides conducting important negotiations with foreign powers, on 4 March 1597 Menmuir was appointed ambassador to France. It was his intention during the visit to Paris to undergo an operation for the stone, but bad health prevented him from making the journey, and in February 1598 he resigned the office of secretary of state. He died at Balcarres, Fife, 3 September 1598, and in accordance with his Will he was buried in the parish kirk of Kilconquhar.

== Family ==
By his first wife, Marion, daughter of Alexander Guthrie, town clerk of Edinburgh, and widow of David Borthwick of Lokhill, lord advocate, he had two sons—John, lord Menmuir, who died unmarried in January 1601, and David Lindsay, 1st Lord Balcarres—and three daughters: Catherine, married first to Sir John Lindsay of Woodhead, and secondly to John Brown of Fordel; Margaret, to Sir John Strachan of Thornton; and Janet, to Sir David Auchmutie of Auchmutie. By his second wife, Jane née Lauder, relict of both Sir James Forrester of Corstorphine and John Campbell of Calder, he had no issue.

Academic offices
Preceded by Lord Maitland of Thirlestane	Chancellor of the University of St Andrews; 1597–1598	Succeeded by 3rd Earl of Montrose
