= David Lindsay, 1st Lord Balcarres =

Scottish nobleman

David Lindsay, 1st Lord Lindsay of Balcarres (born 1586 or 1567 – 1641) was a Scottish nobleman.

He was born in Edinburgh, Lindsay was the younger son of John Lindsay of Balcarres, Lord Menmuir and Marion Guthrie. His year of birth is given as either 1586 or 1587. Lindsay succeeded his older brother John, who died unmarried in 1601. Lindsay was well-educated and was given a licence to visit France in 1607. Ignacio-Miguel Pascual-Valderrama and Joaquín Pérez-Pariente place Lindsay in the city of Poitiers from 1608 to 1609 using manuscripts from his book collection. An inscription in another of his books suggests he was in Paris at the end of 1609.

Lindsay returned to Scotland by 1612 as he married Lady Sophia Seton, daughter of Alexander Seton, 1st Earl of Dunfermline, on 16 February 1612. He was created Baron Lindsay of Balcarres on 27 June 1633. He was a staunch royalist. He was buried in the Chapel at Balcarres, Fife. He had one son, Alexander, later the first Earl of Balcarres, and a daughter Sophia, who died in childbirth following her marriage to Robert Moray.

Lindsay's private library was "one of the largest in early modern Scotland", estimated to contain around 1000 to 1200 works. Poet William Drummond of Hawthornden wrote in a letter that it was difficult to find Lindsay a book which he did not already have. It was largely destroyed or dispersed after his death in 1641, with a small remainder being owned by the Earl of Crawford. In 1901, the manuscripts of the Crawford collection and part of Lindsay's library were bought by Enriqueta Augustina Rylands and given to the John Rylands Library. The Library became part of the University of Manchester in 1972 and the Balcarres and Crawford papers were given to the National Library of Scotland in 1988.

Peerage of Scotland
New creation	Lord Lindsay of Balcarres; 1633–1642	Succeeded by Alexander Lindsay
