= Earl of Crawford =

Title in the peerage of Scotland

Earl of Crawford held with title Earl of Balcarres
- Earls of Crawford: Quarterly, 1st and 4th Gules, a fesse, chequy, argent, and azure, (Lindsay); 2nd and 3rd, or, a lion rampant, gules, debruised of a ribbon in bend, sable (Abernethy).
- Creation date: 1398
- Created by: Robert III of Scotland
- Peerage: Scotland
- First holder: Sir David Lindsay
- Present holder: Anthony Lindsay, 30th Earl of Crawford
- Heir apparent: Alexander Thomas Lindsay, Lord Balniel
- Remainder to: heirs male of the body of the grantee
- Subsidiary titles: Earl of Balcarres; Lord Lindsay of Crawford; Lord Lindsay and Balniel; Baron Wigan of Haigh Hall
- Seat: Balcarres House
- Motto: Endure Fort (Endure bravely)

Earl of Crawford is one of the most ancient titles extant in Great Britain, having been created in the Peerage of Scotland in 1398 for Sir David Lindsay. It is the premier earldom recorded on the Union Roll.

== Early history ==
Sir David Lindsay, who married Elizabeth Stewart, Countess of Crawford, a daughter of Robert III, was the 9th baron of Crawford, Lanarkshire. He was given the title of Earl of Crawford by Robert III in 1398, along with Crawford Castle.

The title descended to the first Earl's descendants without much incident, until the death of David Lindsay, 8th Earl of Crawford, in 1542. The eighth Earl had a son, Alexander, commonly called the Wicked Master, who frequently quarrelled with his father and even tried to murder him. The Wicked Master was sentenced to death for his crime, and the eighth Earl conveyed his title to a cousin, also called David Lindsay, a descendant of the third Earl of Crawford, and excluded from the succession all of the Wicked Master's descendants. However, the ninth earl, although he had his own sons, named the Wicked Master's son David as his heir; thus, in 1558, at the ninth Earl's death, the earldom returned to the main branch of the family. The ninth Earl is frequently referred to as an interpolated Earl, as are the 17th-22nd Earls.

== Later history ==
At the death of Ludovic Lindsay, 16th Earl of Crawford, the title was passed, despite senior heirs, to a cousin, John, who had already been created Earl of Lindsay. The earldoms of Crawford and Lindsay continued to be united until the 22nd earl died unmarried in January 1808. The two earldoms then became dormant until the respective heirs could prove their claims to the titles.

In 1843, James Lindsay, 7th Earl of Balcarres put forward his claim to the Earldom of Crawford; in 1848, the House of Lords allowed it. The claim was based on the extensive research of his son Lord Lindsay. It was held that the seventh Earl's father, the sixth Earl, was the lawful successor to the earldom of Crawford (though he did not claim it); therefore, the sixth Earl of Balcarres was posthumously declared the 23rd Earl of Crawford, and his son, the seventh Earl of Balcarres, became the 24th Earl of Crawford. Thereafter, these two earldoms have remained united (but the Earldom of Lindsay is separate).

Between 1963 and 2019, the 28th Earl and the 29th Earl acted as Premier Earl of Scotland.

== Subsidiary titles ==
The subsidiary titles associated with the Earl of Crawford and Balcarres are: Lord Lindsay of Crawford (created 1398), Lord Lindsay and Balniel (1651) and Baron Wigan of Haigh Hall (1826). The former two subsidiary titles, as well as the two Earldoms, are in the Peerage of Scotland. The barony is in the Peerage of the United Kingdom, and so entitled the Earls of Crawford and Balcarres to sit in the House of Lords even before the passage of the Peerage Act 1963 extended that right to peers of Scotland.

The 29th Earl sat in the House of Lords as Baron Balniel, of Pitcorthie in the County of Fife, a peerage under the Life Peerages Act 1958 conferred on him in 1974 after leaving the House of Commons in the aftermath of the October 1974 general election while his father was still living.

The Earl of Crawford is the hereditary Clan Chief of Clan Lindsay.

== Family seat ==
The family seat is Balcarres House in Colinsburgh, Fife. Until the 1940s they were also seated at Haigh Hall, Lancashire. The traditional burial place of the Earls of Crawford is the family chapel at Balcarres House.

== Earls of Crawford (1398) ==
- David Lindsay, 1st Earl of Crawford (died 1407)
- Alexander Lindsay, 2nd Earl of Crawford (c. 1387–1438)
- David Lindsay, 3rd Earl of Crawford (died 1445)
- Alexander Lindsay, 4th Earl of Crawford (died 1453)
- David Lindsay, 1st Duke of Montrose, 5th Earl of Crawford (1440–1495)
- John Lindsay, 6th Earl of Crawford (died c. 1513)
- Alexander Lindsay, 7th Earl of Crawford (died 1517)
- David Lindsay, 8th Earl of Crawford (died 1542)
- David Lindsay, 9th Earl of Crawford (died 1558)
- David Lindsay, 10th Earl of Crawford (died 1574)
- David Lindsay, 11th Earl of Crawford (c. 1547–1607)
- David Lindsay, 12th Earl of Crawford (died 1621)
- Henry Lindsay, 13th Earl of Crawford (died 1622)
- George Lindsay, 14th Earl of Crawford (died 1633)
- Alexander Lindsay, 15th Earl of Crawford (died 1639)
- Ludovic Lindsay, 16th Earl of Crawford (died 1652)

== Earls of Crawford (1642) ==
- John Lindsay, 17th Earl of Crawford, 1st Earl of Lindsay (c. 1598–1678) (descended from 1st Earl's uncle, received Earldom of Crawford under regrant of 1642)
- William Lindsay, 18th Earl of Crawford, 2nd Earl of Lindsay (1644–1698)
- John Lindsay, 19th Earl of Crawford, 3rd Earl of Lindsay (died 1713)
- John Lindsay, 20th Earl of Crawford, 4th Earl of Lindsay (1702–1749)
- George Lindsay-Crawford, 21st Earl of Crawford, 5th Earl of Lindsay (1723–1781)
- George Lindsay-Crawford, 22nd Earl of Crawford, 6th Earl of Lindsay (1758–1808) (dormant 1808; last male line descendant of 1st Earl of Lindsay, Earldom of Lindsay passed (according to Lords decision in 1878) to a kinsman of 1st Earl of Lindsay and that of Crawford reverted to the senior surviving line, as determined 1848)
- Alexander Lindsay, 23rd Earl of Crawford, 6th Earl of Balcarres (1752–1825) (de jure; descended from second son of 3rd Earl of Crawford)
- James Lindsay, 24th Earl of Crawford, 7th Earl of Balcarres (1783–1869) (revived 1848)
- Alexander Lindsay, 25th Earl of Crawford, 8th Earl of Balcarres (1812–1880)
- James Ludovic Lindsay, 26th Earl of Crawford, 9th Earl of Balcarres (1847–1913)
- David Alexander Edward Lindsay, 27th Earl of Crawford, 10th Earl of Balcarres (1871–1940)
- David Alexander Robert Lindsay, 28th Earl of Crawford, 11th Earl of Balcarres (1900–1975)
- Robert Alexander Lindsay, 29th Earl of Crawford, 12th Earl of Balcarres (1927–2023)
- Anthony Robert Lindsay, 30th Earl of Crawford, 13th Earl of Balcarres (b. 1958)

The heir apparent is the present holder's son Alexander Thomas Lindsay, Lord Balniel (b. 1991)
The heir apparent’s heir apparent is Ludovic James Lindsay, Master of Crawford (b. 2020)

== Arms ==
Coat of arms of Earl of Crawford
Crest A Swan's Head neck and wings Proper issuing from an antique Ducal coronet Or Escutcheon Quarterly, 1st and 4th, Gules a Fess chequy Argent and Azure (Lindsay), 2nd and 3rd, Or a Lion rampant Gules debruised of a ribbon in bend Sable (Abernethy) Supporters Two Lions rampant guardant Gules armed and langued Azure Motto Endure fort ("Endure bravely")

== See also ==
- Lindsay family tree (showing the relationship between some of the above)
- Crawford Priory
- Earl of Balcarres
- Earl of Lindsay
- Endure Pursuivant
