= David Lindsay, 9th Earl of Crawford =

Scottish peer and MP

David Lindsay, 9th Earl of Crawford MP (died 10 September 1558) was a Scottish peer and Member of Parliament.

First known as David Lindsay of Edzell, he inherited the Earldom from David Lindsay, 8th Earl of Crawford by nomination. His second wife was Katherine Campbell, Countess of Crawford. They married before November 1550 and they had seven children.

== Succession ==
He was succeeded as Earl of Crawford by the 8th Earl's grandson David Lindsay, 10th Earl of Crawford. The 8th Earl's son, Alexander Lindsay, Master of Crawford, the "Wicked Master", tried to kill his father in 1537, and so was disinherited and died in 1542. The 8th Earl chose who would succeed him to the Earldom of Crawford – David Lindsay of Edzell, a distant cousin who was descended from the 3rd Earl. James V set a penalty of 100,000 merks for this transaction, so that earldom would come back to the crown. The 9th Earl, Lindsay of Edzell, then chose to leave the earldom, not to his own sons, but to the son of the Wicked Master of Crawford, another David Lindsay. So the 8th earl's grandson became Master of Crawford in 1546. A modern historian Jamie Cameron argued that this outcome was envisaged by James V when he set the penalty, so that the heirs of the Wicked Master were not excluded from the earldom. The sequence of events and size of the penalty has been used by other writers as evidence of the greed of James V and Regent Arran.

== Family ==
He married, firstly, Janet Gray, daughter of Patrick Gray, Master of Gray, and Annabella Forbes, before 12 June 1535.

He married, secondly, in 1550 Katherine Campbell (d. 1578), widow of James Ogilvy, Master of Ogilvy and daughter of Sir John Campbell, 1st of Cawdor and Muriel Calde, in 1550. She had been a lady-in-waiting to Mary of Guise. Their children included:

- John Lindsay of Balcarres, Lord Menmuir.
- Sir David Lindsay of Edzell
- Walter Lindsay of Balgavie
- Elizabeth Lindsay (d. 1585), who married Patrick Drummond, 3rd Lord Drummond.
- Margaret Lindsay, who married John Stewart, 6th Lord Innermeath (d. 1603) who was made Earl of Atholl in 1596.

Katherine Campbell died at Brechin Castle in October 1578. Her will mentions a silver bowl bought for her in Paris when she was a companion of Mary of Guise. She left a bed of green stemming embroidered with black velvet and white silk to Sir David Lindsay of Edzell. She left a bed of cloth of gold with curtains of varying colour taffeta with fringes of crimson and yellow silk to Lord Ogilvy. To her daughter Margaret, she left a black velvet gown trimmed with ermine, with a purple damask skirt. She left to Helen Ogilvy, Lady Inverquharity younger, a daughter from her first marriage, 300 merks for her grandchildren. To her daughter Agnes Ogilvy, Lady Dun younger, a gold chained pledged for the lands of Inverquharity and black damask to make a new gown from fabric she had bought for clothes for herself.

Elizabeth Lindsay, Lady Drummond, her daughter, was to have her gold bracelets with white enamel work and a black velvet gown with borders of embroidered satin. Margaret Forbes, if she married, was to have 200 merks, and Katherine Campbell recommended that she be brought up by her sister Janet Campbell, Lady Lovat.

Peerage of Scotland
Preceded by David Lindsay	Earl of Crawford; 1542–1558	Succeeded by David Lindsay
