= David Lindsay of Edzell, Lord Edzell =

Scottish judge

Sir David Lindsay of Edzell, Lord Edzell (1551?–1610) was a Scottish judge.

== Early life ==
The eldest son of David Lindsay, 9th Earl of Crawford and Catherine Campbell, daughter of Sir John Campbell of Lorn. His mother had been married before and he had five half siblings. Lindsay was born about 1551. On the death of his father in 1558 he succeeded only to barony and other estates of Edzell, the earldom of Crawford passing to David Lindsay, 10th Earl of Crawford, son of the "wicked master". With his brother, Lord Menmuir, he was educated on the continent under the care of James Lawson.

Edzell was one of those who on 3 May 1578 signed a band in favour of the Earl of Mar as guardian of the young king James VI of Scotland. On 14 June of the same year he appeared as procurator for the sureties of David Lindsay, 11th Earl of Crawford. He was knighted at the creation of Esmé Stuart as Duke of Lennox in October 1581. On 27 August 1583, a remission was granted to Lindsay and others under the great seal for the murder of Campbell of Lundie.

He was interested in agricultural improvement and the exploitation of minerals on his estate. In March 1594, Lord Menmuir convinced a German mining expert Bernard Fechtenburg working for Thomas Foulis to work for Edzell. Fechtenburg said that Edzell's samples of ores were more promising than an assay made by Foulis' other experts suggested. David Lindsay of Edzell was a witness at the baptism of a son of the Flemish prospector Eustachius Roche in August 1598.

== Judge ==
On 2 May 1593, Lindsay was, under the title of Lord Edzell, admitted a lord of session. His name first appears as a member of the privy council on 16 November 1598.

Lindsay was one of six knights appointed to hold up the canopy or "pale" at the baptism of Prince Charles in 1600.

Jonet Patersone [Janet Paterson or Patterson], a farmer in Gallowleyis near Edzell complained about Lindsay, her landlord, in 1602 to the Privy Council. She said that some of his retainers had burned her farmyard down in 1599. Her mother complained to James VI when he was in Angus. This enraged David Lindsay, and she alleged he had threatened her mother and frightened her to death. Patersone claimed he also threatened her, that he would roast her on a hot griddle if she complained again. He had subsequently evicted her. The Privy Council found in favour of David Lindsay, since there was no proof of fire-raising, and Lindsay evicted her and took her goods for debt.

For conniving at a fray between his son and the young laird of Pitarrow in the High Street of Edinburgh, 17 June 1605, he was for a short time warded in Dumbarton Castle. John Tod, a member of Edinburgh's town guard was hurt in the fight. Both lairds had to pay £50 as compensation for Tod's injury and medical bills.

In 1607, while seeking to revenge the murder of his brother, Sir Walter Lindsay of Balgavie, he was at least indirectly the cause of the death of Alexander Lindsay, 1st Lord Spynie. On 10 August 1609, the privy council fixed 19 September for the trial of him and his son Alexander for the murder, but his prosecutor, David Lindsay, 12th Earl of Crawford, having failed to appear, no trial took place.

Edzell died on 18 December 1610.

== Family ==
He married Helen Lindsay, a daughter of David Lindsay, 10th Earl of Crawford. Their children included:

- David Lindsay of Edzell
- John Lindsay
- Alexander Lindsay of Canterland
- Margaret Lindsay, who married to David Carnegie, 1st Earl of Southesk

He married secondly Isobel Forbes, they had no issue.

== Notes ==
Attribution

This article incorporates text from a publication now in the public domain: Lee, Sidney, ed. (1893). "Lindsay, David (1551?-1610)". Dictionary of National Biography. Vol. 33. London: Smith, Elder & Co.
