= Colinsburgh =

Village in Fife, Scotland

Coordinates: 56.2206°N 2.8463°W

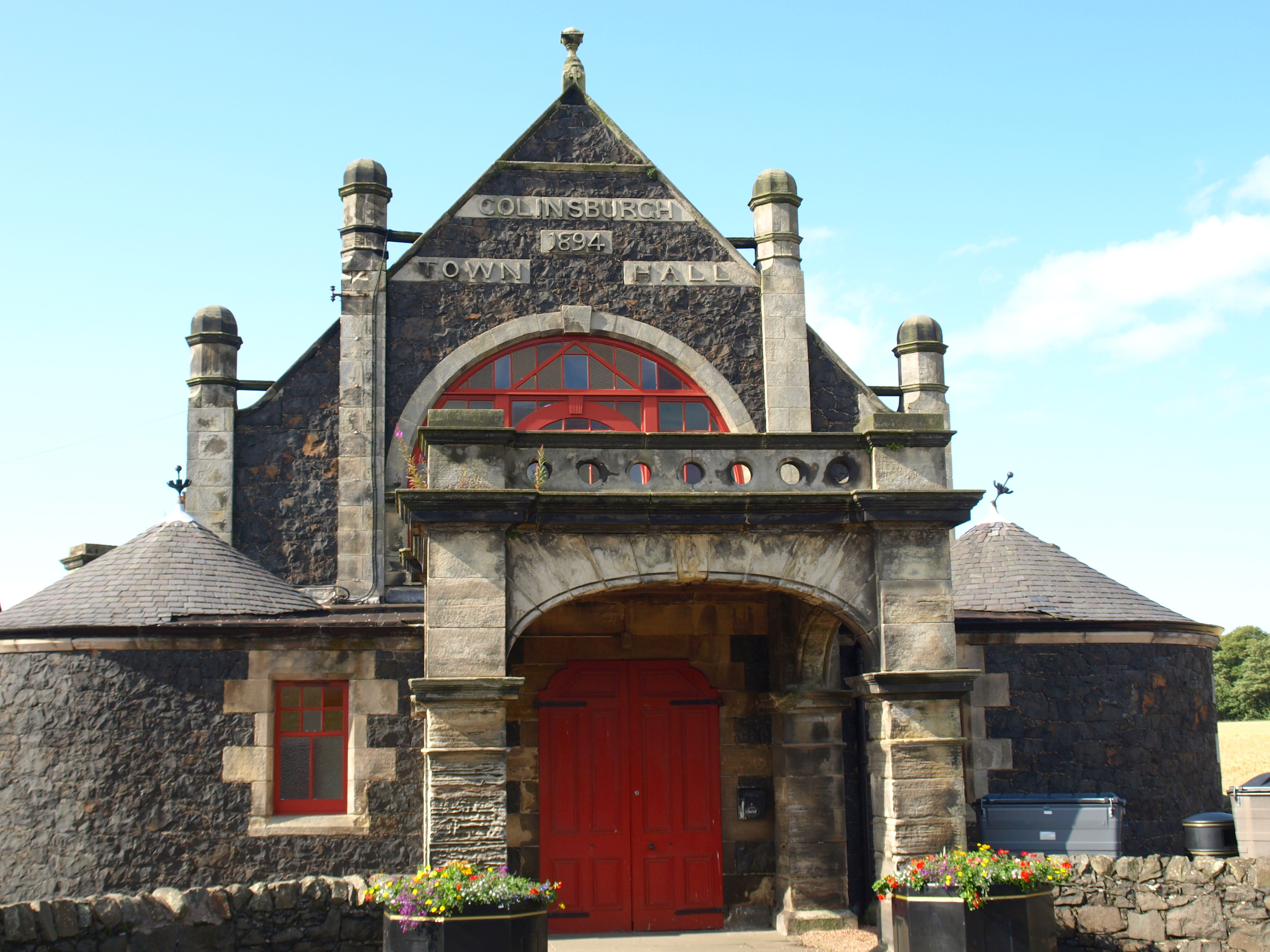
- Colinsburgh Town Hall

- Location within Fife
- OS grid reference: NJ925065
- Civil parish: Kilconquhar
- Council area: Fife
- Lieutenancy area: Fife
- Country: Scotland
- Sovereign state: United Kingdom
- Post town: Leven
- Postcode district: KY
- Police: Scotland
- Fire: Scottish
- Ambulance: Scottish
- UK Parliament: North East Fife
- Scottish Parliament: North East Fife

Colinsburgh is a village in east Fife, Scotland, in the parish of Kilconquhar.

== History ==
The village is named after Colin Lindsay, 3rd Earl of Balcarres (1652–1722), who gave the land on which it was built. It was here that the first meeting of the Presbytery of Relief was held in 1761 after its founders had broken from the Church of Scotland.

Most of the houses lie along the main road running from east to west. The village has a small primary school in a two-storey building dating to 1875, with three classrooms and 47 pupils as of 2011. The school is linked to the Waid Academy, a nearby secondary school. The town hall, beside the school, dates to 1894. The town hall hosts the non-profit Colinsburgh Community Cinema, which screens 18 films per season. The Colinsburgh Galloway Library is on the main street in the middle of the village, open twice a week. The library has been used as the venue for concerts.

The Charleton Estate to the west is based on an estate house first built in 1749, with various more recent alterations including the addition of Roman busts to the front wall. The estate has a fairly new golf course and a stables. Balcarres House is just north of the village, based on a mansion built in 1595 by John Lindsay, second son of the ninth Earl of Crawford. The house became the family seat of the Earl of Crawford. The present house was mostly built in the early nineteenth century using part of a fortune made in India, but preserves most of the original mansion.

Colinsburgh Town Hall was completed in 1895.

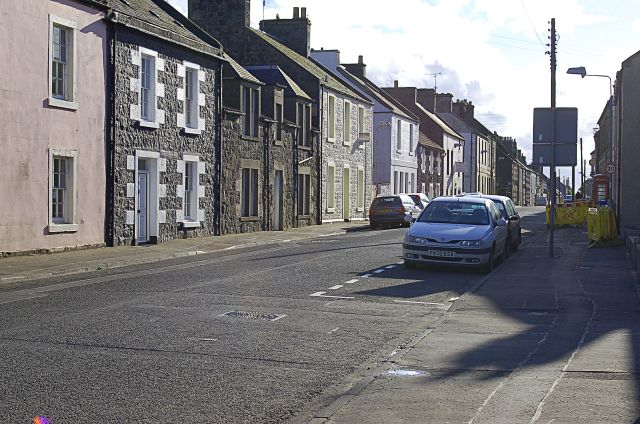
Main street, eastern end looking west

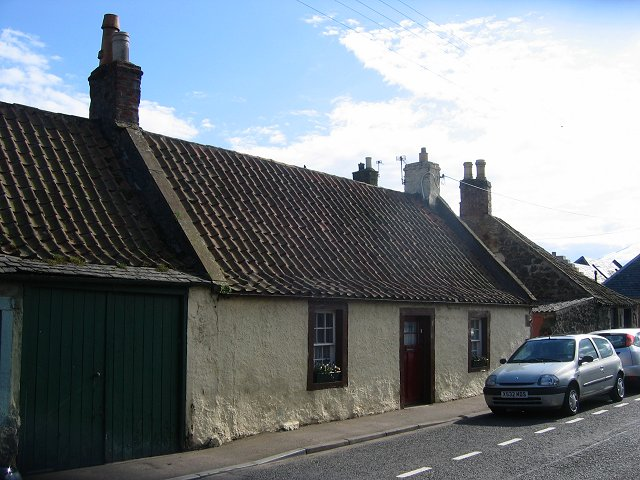
Small cottage in the village

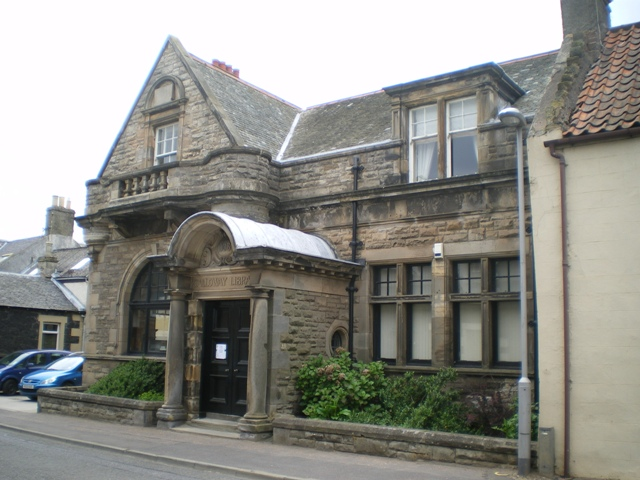
Colinsburg library

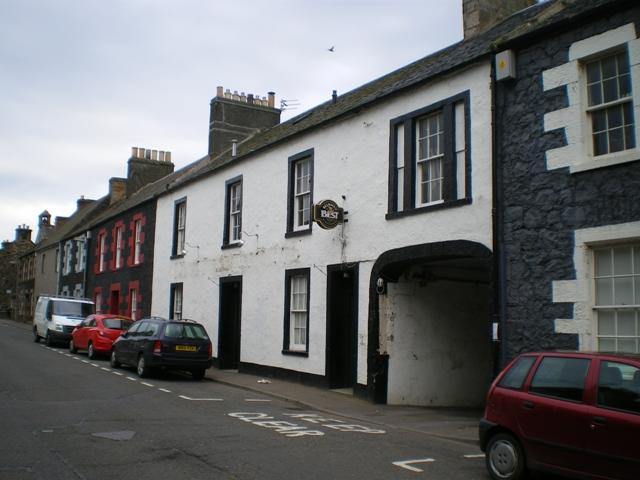
The former Balcarres Arms Hotel in the village

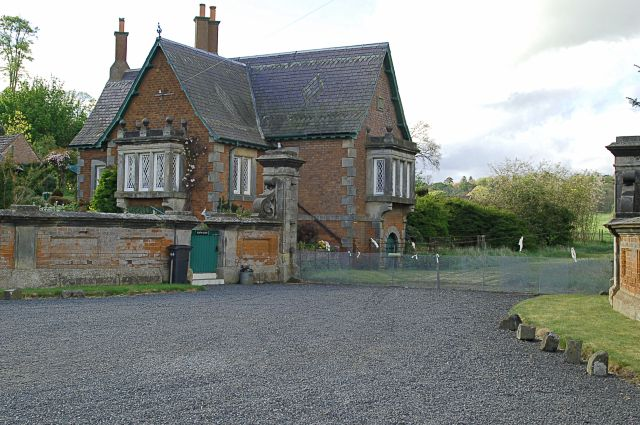
Balcarres Gatehouse, just east of the village

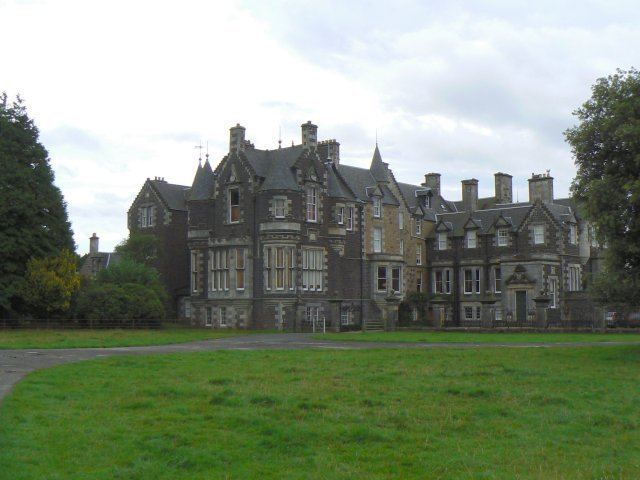
Balcarres House, the stately home of the Earl of Crawford and Balcarres, just north of the village
