= David Lindsay, 11th Earl of Crawford =

Scottish nobleman

David Lindsay, 11th Earl of Crawford PC (c. 1547–1607) was a Scottish nobleman and privy councillor.

== Life ==
He was the eldest son of David Lindsay, 10th Earl of Crawford, by Margaret, daughter of Cardinal Beaton and Marion Ogilvy, and was born about 1547. He was one of five sons, the others being: Sir Henry Lindsay of Kinfauns, to be the thirteenth earl; Sir John of Ballinscho; Alexander Lindsay, 1st Lord Spynie; and James. The 10th earl had also a daughter, Helen, married to Sir David Lindsay, Lord Edzell.

The 11th earl had a reputation for extravagance, was francophile, and of uncertain religious views. On 17 March 1577–8 he became involved in an affray which resulted in the death of his hereditary enemy, the Lord-chancellor Glamis. The two lords being in attendance on the king at Stirling happened, with their followers, to meet; they made way for each other, and ordered their followers to do the same, but the hindmost came to blows. In the fray, the chancellor was shot dead, and the blame for the murder was assigned by many to Crawford. David Hume of Godscroft wrote that Crawford was a good shot and Glamis presented an easy target as he was so tall.

Crawford was sent a prisoner to Edinburgh Castle, but on 14 June was permitted to pass to his house at Cairnie in Fife on giving sureties again to enter into ward on fifteen days' notice. For his failure to act on this arrangement on 5 March 1579, his sureties, David Lindsay of Edzell and Patrick Lindsay, 6th Lord Lindsay were fined, and on 1 September they gave a caution in £20,000 for his appearance at the Tolbooth of Edinburgh on 3 November. According to Sir James Balfour, he was found innocent; and on 5 November he signed a band, under pain of £10,000, not to molest Thomas Lyon of Balduckie, Master of Glamis, and tutor or guardian of the young heir, Patrick Lyon, 9th Lord Glamis.

Not long afterwards the earl went over to France in company with George Gordon, 6th Earl of Huntly, having on 7 December obtained a license to go abroad for three years. He returned to Scotland before the last day of February 1581, when he renewed the band for the non-molestation of the tutor of Glamis.

== Ruthven ==
Crawford was one of those who, in 1582, assembled at St Andrews in support of the king after his escape from Ruthven. Shortly afterwards he was chosen master stabler to the king, and, against the wishes of the inhabitants of Dundee, was made provost of the town. On the Earl of Arran's return to power in August of this year he became one of his main supporters, and at the parliament held on the 22nd, he carried the sword. He was one of those who, on 14 November, convoyed the young Duke of Lennox from Leith where he had landed from France, to the king at Kinneil. He took part in the trial of William Ruthven, 1st Earl of Gowrie in May 1584, and after the earl's forfeiture, received from the king the barony and regality of Scone and the church lands of Abernethy. With the king and Arran he was seized in Stirling Castle by the banished lords on 1 November, and for a short time was committed to the charge of Lord Hamilton at Kinneil.

Isobel Morris, a servant of Helen Huntar, the wife of Alan Lentroun in St Andrews, stated that the "Lord of Crawfurd" was in bed with Huntar when Lentroun returned from his voyages in 1585. She was also said to have committed adultery with the earl's brother, Alexander Lindsay.

He was at the reconciliation banquet at Holyrood House in May 1587, and in the procession on the following day walked arm in arm with his hereditary enemy, the Master of Glamis; but these ceremonies were empty gestures. Having been converted to the Catholic faith by the Jesuit William Crichton, he was concerned along with Lord Claud Hamilton, Huntly and Francis Hay, 9th Earl of Erroll in a correspondence with Spain in reference to a Spanish invasion of England; and he was also associated with other schemes of the Catholic nobles. In the spring of 1589, he and Huntly appeared in arms at Perth and shortly afterwards waylaid the treasurer Glamis, whom for some time they kept in captivity in the north. From Perth they proceeded northwards to the bridge of Dee; but on the appearance of the king with a greatly inferior force, they disbanded their troops.

Crawford delivered himself up at Edinburgh on 20 May 1589, asserting that Huntly had beguiled him into the belief that he had a commission from the king for gathering his forces. He was on the 21st convicted of treason, and sentenced to be confined in St Andrews Castle during the king's pleasure; he received his release the following September. He possibly then went to France, but in any case was in Scotland by 3 February 1591, when he was present at a meeting of the privy council. His attendance at the council continued during subsequent years, as did his feuds with Lord Glamis.

He died before 15 October 1607 at Cupar, Fife, and was buried at Dundee.

== Family ==
He married first Lilias, one of "seven bonnie sisters", daughters of David, Lord Drummond. According to the old ballad of Earl Crawford, he separated from Lilias on account of a jest of hers in reference to the paternity of a son. By his second wife, Griselda Stewart, daughter of John Stewart, 4th Earl of Atholl, he had four children: David, James, Claude and Agnes.

Peerage of Scotland
Preceded by David Lindsay	Earl of Crawford; 1574–1607	Succeeded by David Lindsay
