= Henry Lindsay, 13th Earl of Crawford =

Scottish landowner and courtier

Henry Lindsay, 13th Earl of Crawford (died 1623) was a Scottish courtier and landowner involved in feuds.

== Career ==
Henry Lindsay was a younger brother of David Lindsay, 11 Earl of Crawford, a son of David Lindsay, 10th Earl of Crawford and Margaret Beaton, daughter of Cardinal Beaton and Marion Ogilvy. However, he took the name Charteris in 1584 and was adopted as heir to John Charteris of Kinfauns and Janet Chisholm, Lady Kinfauns.

He was known as Harry Charteris of Kinfauns from 1585, then Lord of Kinfauns from 1601, then Lord of Carelstoun from 1608-1621, was a Scottish landowner and courtier. His son inherited Kinfauns from his father as a wedding gift but predeceased the father, after the son's death it reverted back and he sold the Kinfauns estate with lordship. He only enjoyed the earldom for two years, before inheriting the earldom to cover debts of his nephew (the previous earl).

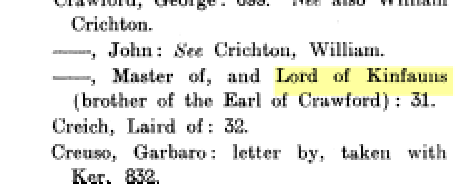
A page from the index of printed book, the Calendar of the State Papers Relating to Scotland and Mary, Queen of Scots, 1547-1603.

Lindsay was Master of the Household for Anne of Denmark and audited her household accounts, with William Schaw. This position was not as lucrative as he hoped, and in 1592 with a cousin and fellow Master of Household, David Beaton of Melgund, he complained about their arduous roles and low wage compared to other officers.

In December 1591 Lindsay, during the Raid of Holyrood, defended the door of the queen's chamber at Holyrood Palace against the followers of Francis Stewart, 5th Earl of Bothwell.

Lindsay probably built the house at Careston or "Carrestoun" which has fireplaces following the patterns of the French designer Jacques I Androuet du Cerceau. In 1598 he built the Charteris burial aisle at Kinfauns where his heraldry features conjoined with that of his wife Helen Chisholm, with their initials "HC" and "HCL". Helen was the daughter of Sir James Chisholm of Cromlix and Jean Drummond a daughter of Sir John Drummond 2nd of Innerpeffray.

In June 1592 Lindsay and 40 armed followers attacked the Place of Pitfour at night. They hid themselves close to the house and sent a messenger boy to get the yard gates or "yetts" opened. The trick worked but David Cochrane's defenders beat them back and closed the gates. Lindsay's men then managed to break into the castle, forced the family and their retainers out, and put in his own men under his servant John Tweedy.

In 1594 Lindsay attempted to evade rents for lands and fishing at Brechin owed to Annabell Murray, Countess of Mar but the Parliament of Scotland found against him. On 21 September 1594 he attempted to intercede with James VI for the Earl of Huntly and offered to help capture the rebel Earl of Bothwell, but the king dismissed his intervention.

In July 1602 his followers and other retainers of the Lindsay family attacked David Ogilvy, a son of Lord Ogilvy, on his way from Holyrood Abbey. Ogilvy was badly injured and his servant William Innes was killed. This outrage, near to the King's Holyrood Palace, was thought to be a quarrel of Lord Spynie.

In 1603 Sir George Home of Spott and Thomas Hamilton complained to the Privy Council of Scotland that Lindsay had gone to Perth with a dozen armed men to find his enemy Patrick Eviot. They found him at the South Inch and shot at him but he was able to escape in a little boat. Lindsay was imprisoned in Edinburgh Castle.

In November 1618 Lindsay, his servant David Knight, and others captured Patrick Lindsay of Barnyards at Glenquiech and imprisoned him at Finavon and the Kirk of Oathlaw, and tried to make him sign away his heritage. The threats were renewed in 1619 in Lindsay's house in Edinburgh and at Patrick's house at Corsuquhy, when Patrick was again imprisoned at Finavon Castle and made him sign documents at Forfar.

Lindsay became Earl of Crawford in 1621. As earl, he began to molest the tenants of David Lord Carnegie. One day Henry Finlayson was walking on his farm at Watterstoun and encountered Lindsay, who grabbed his staff from his hands and beat him with it.

He died in 1623.

== Family ==
Henry Lindsay married three times. His first wife was Beatrix Charteris. They had no children. His second wife was Helen Chisholm. These were connections of the Kinfauns family.

His third wife was Euphemia or Elizabeth Schaw, a daughter of James Schaw of Sauchie. After the death of Harry Lindsay, she appealed to King James for financial and legal assistance. The King asked the treasurer of Scotland, the Earl of Mar, to help because she had been a faithful servant to Anne of Denmark.

Three sons survived him, George, Alexander, and Ludovic, who all became Earl of Crawford in turn. Another son John died before him, John had married Jean Abernethy.

Peerage of Scotland
Preceded by David Lindsay	Earl of Crawford; 1621–1623	Succeeded by George Lindsay
Preceded by John Chateris	Lord Kinfauns; 1601-1608	Succeeded by John Lindsay
