= Walter Lindsay of Balgavie =

Scottish Roman Catholic intriguer

Sir Walter Lindsay of Balgavie (died 25 October 1605) was a Scottish Roman Catholic intriguer.

== Early life ==
He was the third son of Katherine Campbell, Countess of Crawford and David Lindsay, 9th Earl of Crawford. Katherine was the daughter of Sir John Campbell of Lorn and Calder. He acquired the property of Balgavie and Balgavies Castle in Forfarshire on 20 February 1584. In 1580 he became a gentleman of the bedchamber to James VI of Scotland, and also joined a group of young men who subscribed to serve the king in time of war at their own expense.

== Catholic convert ==
Through the influence of the Jesuits James Gordon and William Crichton Lindsay became a convert to Catholicism; He said he was the first whom they induced to recant and openly profess the change of faith. He kept an English Jesuit in his house, and it became a rendezvous of Catholics: his chaplain for 18 months was John Ingram. It was, he stated, mainly through his example that George Gordon, 1st Marquis of Huntly, Francis Hay, 9th Earl of Erroll, and William Douglas, 10th Earl of Angus were induced to make open confession of Catholicism.

In 1589 Lindsay was imprisoned in Edinburgh Castle but on 29 November was conditionally released, Francis Stewart, 5th Earl of Bothwell, becoming his caution that he would enter again into ward and remain there till his trial. On 19 May, for failing to appear, he was denounced as a rebel, and on 11 January 1593 he was charged, on pain of rebellion, to appear before and answer to the king and council. He failed to appear, and in 1593 the king, during a progress in the north, demolished his castle. On 30 September 1594 he was again denounced as a rebel, the special charges against him being communing with conspirators against the true religion, and open avowing of papistry. In May 1594, the General Assembly having recommended that he and others should be apprehended, the king expressed his willingness to do so if possible.

Lindsay went abroad, and probably visited Spain. Having returned to Scotland towards the end of 1598, Lindsay was again denounced: he agreed to enter into a conference with the ministers of the kirk, and to remain within the bounds of the presbytery of Brechin till he had satisfied the kirk regarding his religion. On 24 May 1599, Alexander Lindsay, 1st Lord Spynie became caution for him in five thousand merks; the presumption is that he made his peace with the kirk.

== Death ==
Lindsay took part in the feuds of the Lindsays, and led a turbulent life. On 25 October 1605 he was murdered by his kinsman David Lindsay, Master of Crawford, between Brechin and the Edzell Castle.

== Works ==
Lindsay had printed an Account of the Present State of the Catholic Religion in the Realm of Scotland in the year of our Lord one thousand five hundred and ninety-four.

== Family ==
With his wife Margaret Campbell, sister of David Campbell of Kethnott, Lindsay had a son, David, who succeeded him, and a daughter, Margaret, married to Adam Menzies of Boltoquhan.
