= John Myreton =

John Myreton was a Scottish Catholic priest and Jesuit active in the 1590s.

== Family background ==
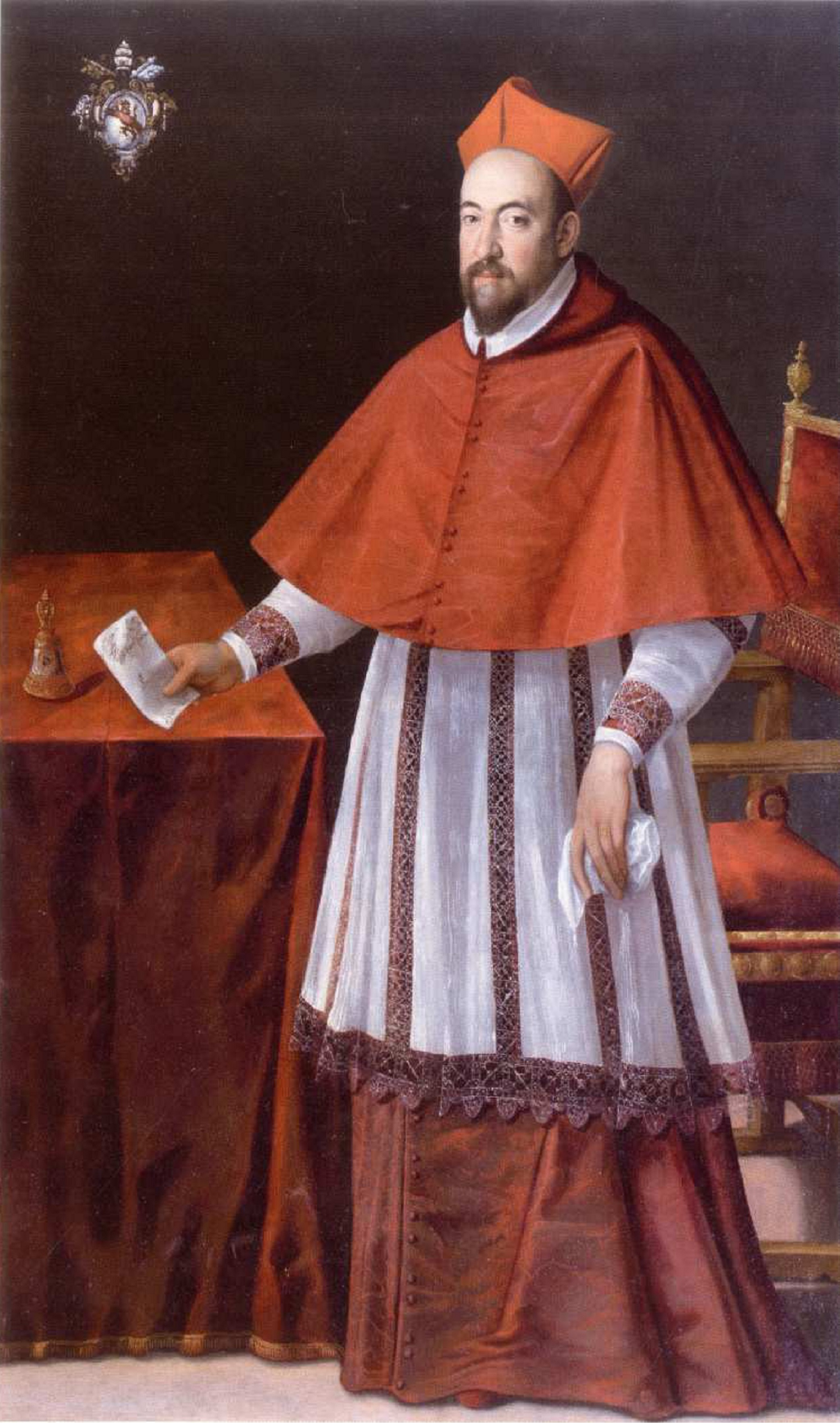
Enrico Caetani entrusted John Myreton with a jewel for a Scottish noblewoman

Some sources call him "Father Morton", he was a brother of the laird of Cambo near Kingsbarns in Fife. His sister Helen Myreton (died 1608) married Robert Denniston, Conservator of the Scottish Staple, and a cousin Elizabeth Myreton married John Learmonth of Balcomie. Carved oak panels with the heraldry of these families remain at the kirk of Crail.

== Mission to Scotland ==
John Myreton studied abroad with Thomas Morison. Scotland was a Protestant country and Catholics were regarded with suspicion.

After ten years abroad, Myreton returned to Scotland in March 1595. William Crichton said that Myreton had bought new clothes in Brussels before travelling to Veere which made him conspicuous. He aroused the suspicions of a fellow passenger on the ship from Flanders, a son of the laird of Dun who told the kirk minister David Lindsay. Myreton was arrested at Leith at night on 23 March and taken to Edinburgh's Tolbooth.

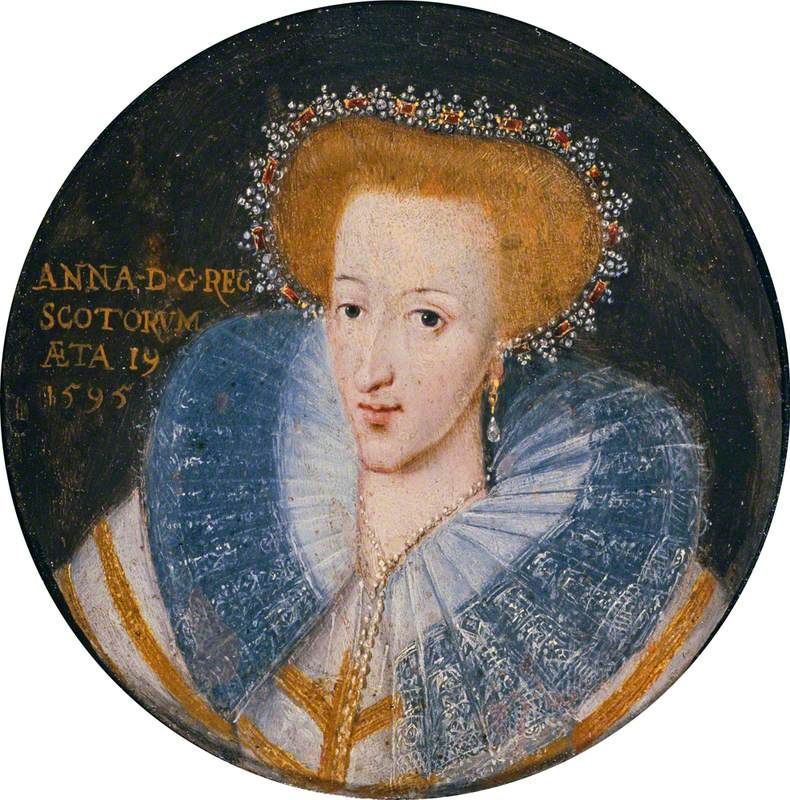
Cajetan's jewel was given to Anne of Denmark

Myreton had brought letters and a cipher key for James Gordon which he tried to destroy by tearing them up using his teeth. Myreton's papers included a statement from Thomas Tyrie (a nephew of James Tyrie) that King James favoured Catholics at court. He also brought a gold jewel depicting the crucifixion. The scene was carved in ivory and set in gold under a crystal.

James VI questioned Myreton and gave the jewel to Anne of Denmark. Myreton said that Cardinal Cajetan (Enrico Caetani) had given him the jewel in Rome and it was intended for a Scottish Catholic noblewoman. A courtier, Roger Aston, reported that Myreton would not reveal who was the intended recipient of the Cardinal's gift. John Colville heard that Myreton had said it was for Anne of Denmark, before changing his story to say the jewel was for a noblewoman in Angus.

Colville and others reported that Myreton wanted to kiss the jewel before it left his custody. George Nicholson and a newsletter written by Christopher Sheperson (a servant of the English ambassador Robert Bowes) report that he suggested King James should kiss the jewel. James joked that the tiny scene was so small he would have to kiss the thieves at the same time. Colville wrote that Myreton's superstition was "much laughed at".

Information about the arrest was shared with the English ambassador Robert Bowes and the Dutch diplomat Adrian Damman. Roger Aston gave further details of Myreton's interrogation, and it was thought he knew more. Myreton had brought a somewhat mixed recommendation from William Crichton, endorsing his constant profession of faith but noting his omission to say matins each morning. There were rumours that he would be tortured with the "boot".

A copy of Myreton's statement of 4 April 1595 was sent by the laird of Easter Wemyss to James Colville to pass to Robert Bowes, which answered questions about his instructions and papers, particularly relating to money sent by the Pope to the Jesuit James Gordon and to the English succession. Bowes also received a copy in Scots of Myreton's instructions, compiled from the torn fragments. The articles presume that King James was sympathetic to Roman Catholicism.

At this time, English observers thought James showed favour to Scottish Catholics who could support his claim to the throne of England. Bowes sent the papers to Robert Cecil in London. It was hoped sharing information would spare James any censure from Elizabeth I. Roger Aston, with the kirk minister Patrick Galloway, pressed for harsher punishment. In June, William Crichton wrote that Myreton was badly treated and kept in chains.

Myreton was released and in Brussels in October 1595. In 1597, Myrton went to Rome and was involved in the foundation of the Scots College.
