= Nicholas Williamson =

English lawyer and Catholic recusant

Nicholas Williamson was an English lawyer and Catholic recusant in the 1590s. He was arrested in 1595 after planning a visit to the court of James VI of Scotland. The Jesuit William Crichton had hoped that Williamson would encourage the ambition of James VI for the throne of England.

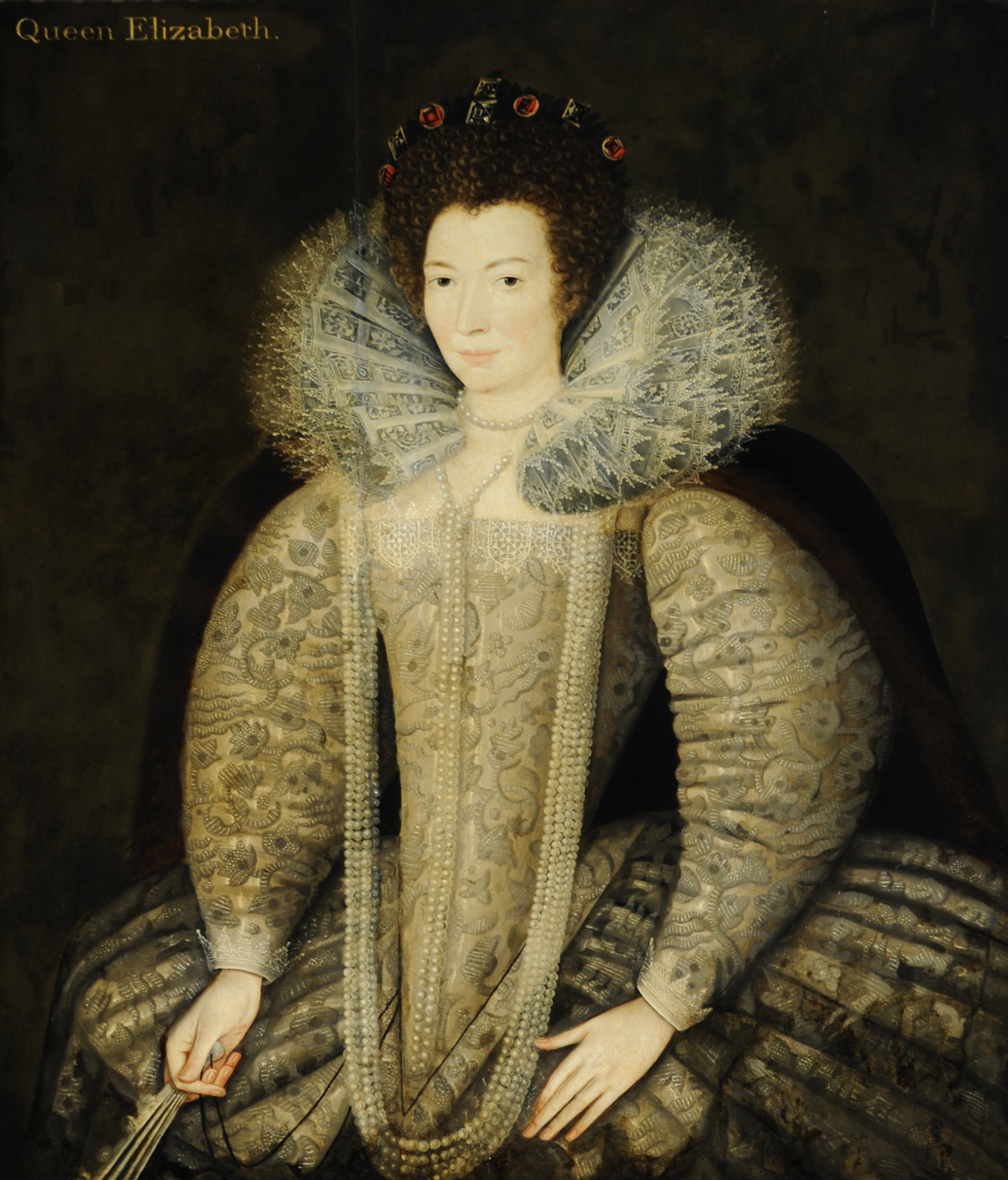
Nicholas Williamson worked for Mary Talbot, Countess of Shrewsbury

== Oxfordshire background ==
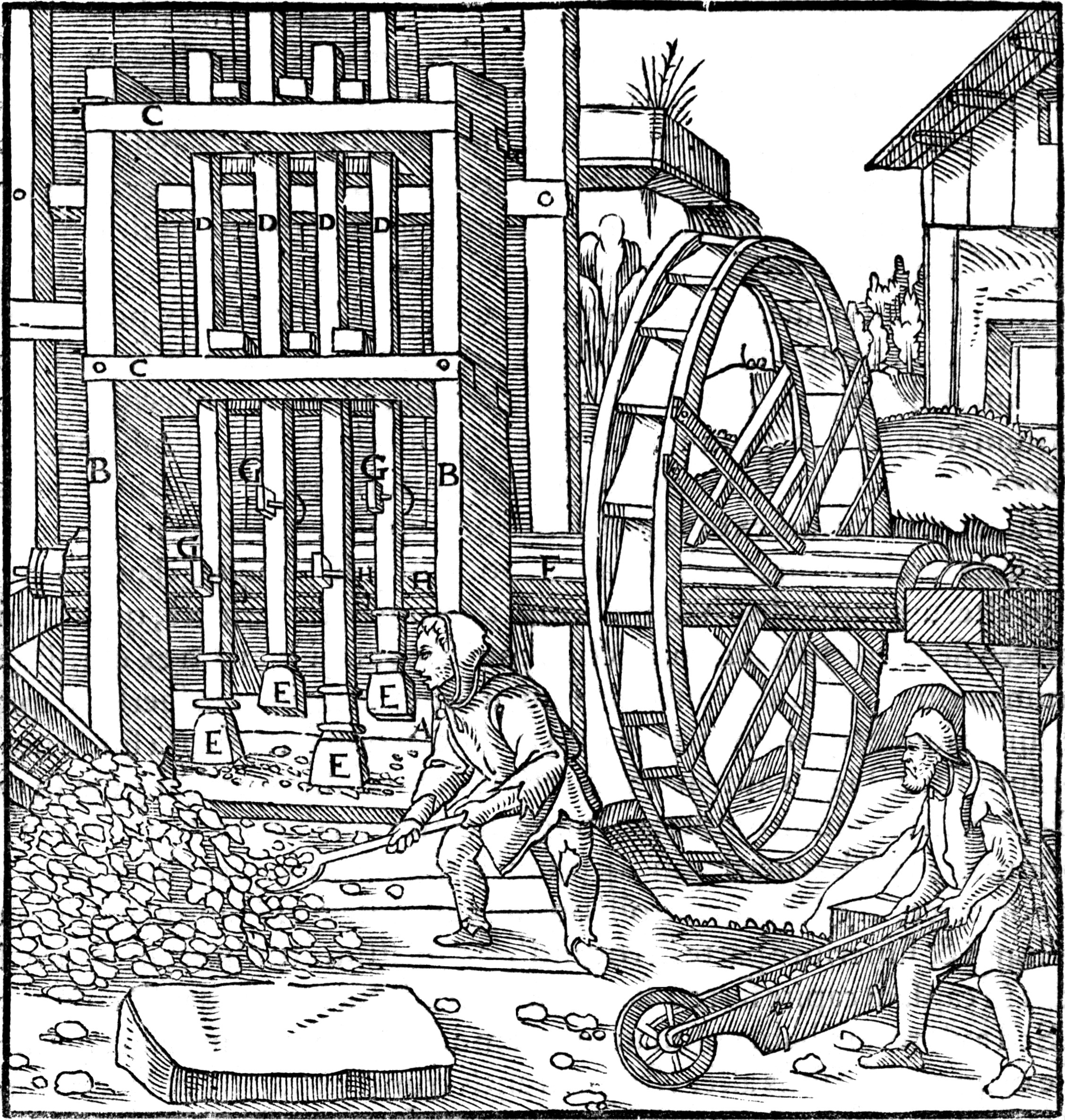
Williamson hired a German stamp mill operator for the Earl of Shrewsbury using his family contacts in Keswick. Woodcut of a stamp mill, Georg Agricola De re metallica (1556)

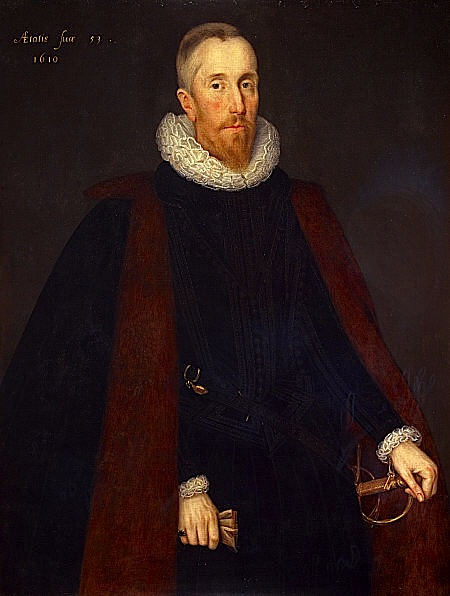
William Crichton wanted to put Williamson in touch with Alexander Seton (pictured) in Scotland

He was a younger son of Thomas Williamson of Tusmore, Oxfordshire. His mother, Bridget, was a daughter of Nicholas Williamson of Mears Ashby in Northamptonshire. Nicholas Williamson could write in Latin, a younger brother William Williamson attended St Edmund Hall, Oxford, while his cousins Francis and Edmund Williamson were at St John's College, Oxford together.

In 1573 Nicholas Williamson married Anne Mordaunt, a daughter of William Mordaunt of Oakley and granddaughter of Lord Mordaunt. They had a daughter. In 1574 his father sold some of his land holding at Tusmore, but not the house, to Sir John Spencer of Althorp.

== Working for the Shrewsburys ==
Nicholas Williamson worked as a legal agent for the Earl of Shrewsbury. He made contracts for mine workers and for the purchase of glass for the Earl's buildings. Williamson advised the Countess of Shrewsbury on the purchase of lands and houses. He was also the administrator or part-owner of the remainder of the estates of Anthony Babington, executed in 1586 for his conspiracy with Mary, Queen of Scots.

The land transactions and ownership of a fish weir on the Trent at Shelford became connected with the family feud of the Shrewsburys and Charles Cavendish with Thomas Stanhope and John Stanhope of Elvaston.

In July 1594 the German mining entrepreneur Emanuel Hochstetter sent a German miner from Keswick, Stephen Murr, to Williamson at Sheffield. Hochstetter wrote that bearer who brought the letter to Williamson would be able to draw a pattern for making a special iron saw to be made locally. Murr would bring his son to speak for him, as his English was not good. Steffan Murr worked processing copper ore at the Newlands and Caldbeck stamp mills, and his English family is documented.

== Antwerp and Douai ==
On Easter Day 1593 the supporters of the Earl of Shrewsbury fought the Stanhopes at the Shelford fish weir. In July 1593, Anne Williamson was questioned by Francis Willoughby of Wollaton about her treatment of a royal messenger who had been sent to the Williamson's house at Wilne in the soke of Sawley to arrest the ringleaders of the fish weir riot. On 10 May 1594 Nicholas Williamson was convicted in the Star Chamber for his part in the "notorious riot" connected with the fish weir. Nicholas Williamson subsequently went to Antwerp, perhaps to avoid a fine. Before making the trip he sold a house to provide for his wife.

Another recusant at the fish weir riot, George More of More Hall near Sheffield, fearing arrest by the Archbishop of York, made his way to Flanders. He was not content to come under the influence of the Jesuit Robert Persons and went to Liège. George More came to Scotland in September 1598 with an introduction or "commendation" to the architect and chamberlain of Anne of Denmark, William Schaw.

Williamson stayed for a time in Antwerp at the house of George Mace, who had been a supporter of Mary, Queen of Scots. While he was there, it was rumoured a miraculous sign of a bloody cross had appeared on his linen. A Jesuit, William Crichton, introduced him to a Scottish student at Douai, David Law, who was intended to accompany him to Scotland. Williamson and Law sailed from Calais intending to go to Leith in Scotland. Williamson became sea-sick and instead they landed at Yarmouth in Norfolk and made their way north through England towards the Scottish Border.

== Arrested near Keswick ==
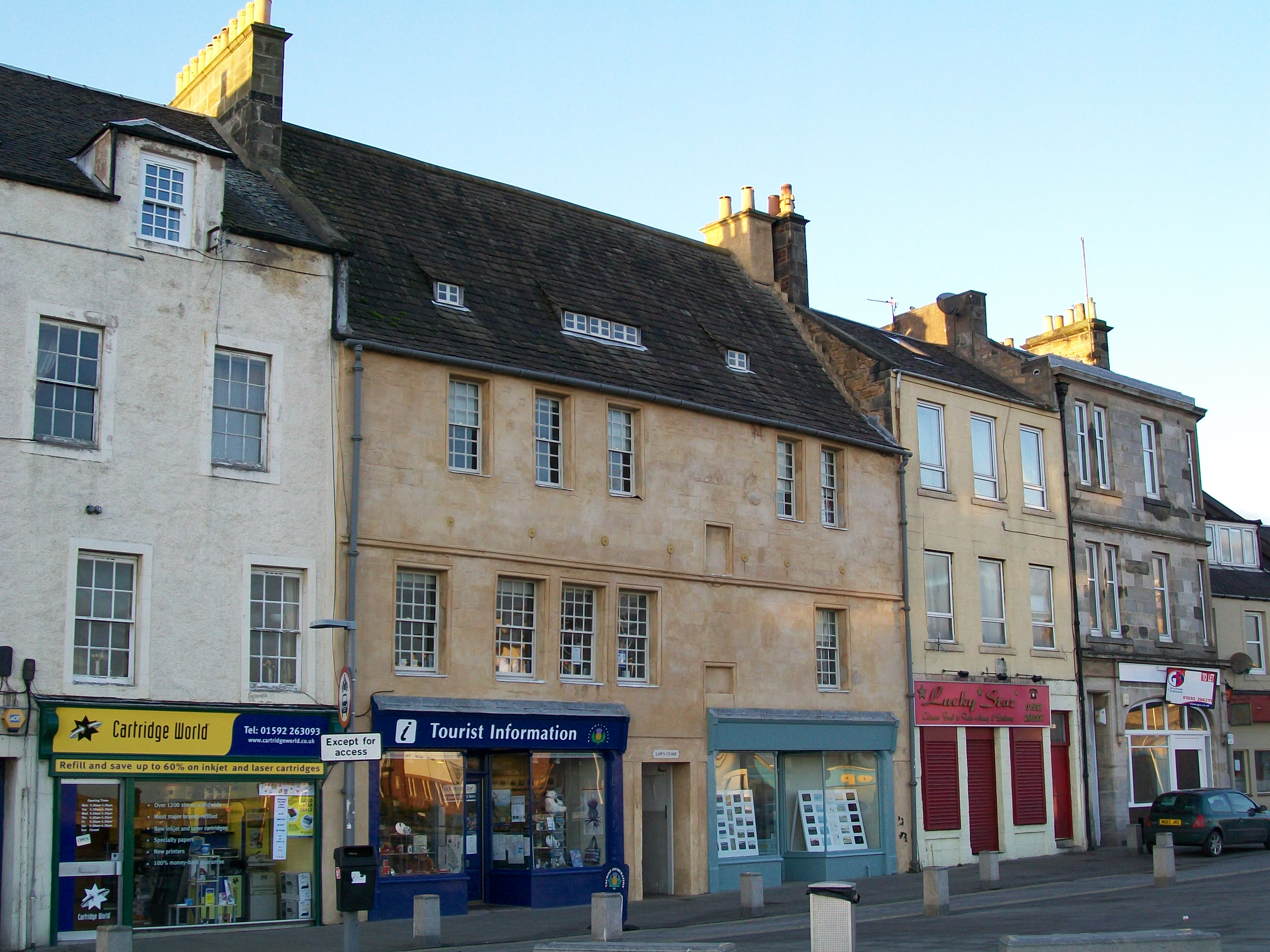
The Law family home in Kirkcaldy is preserved by the Scottish Historic Buildings Trust.

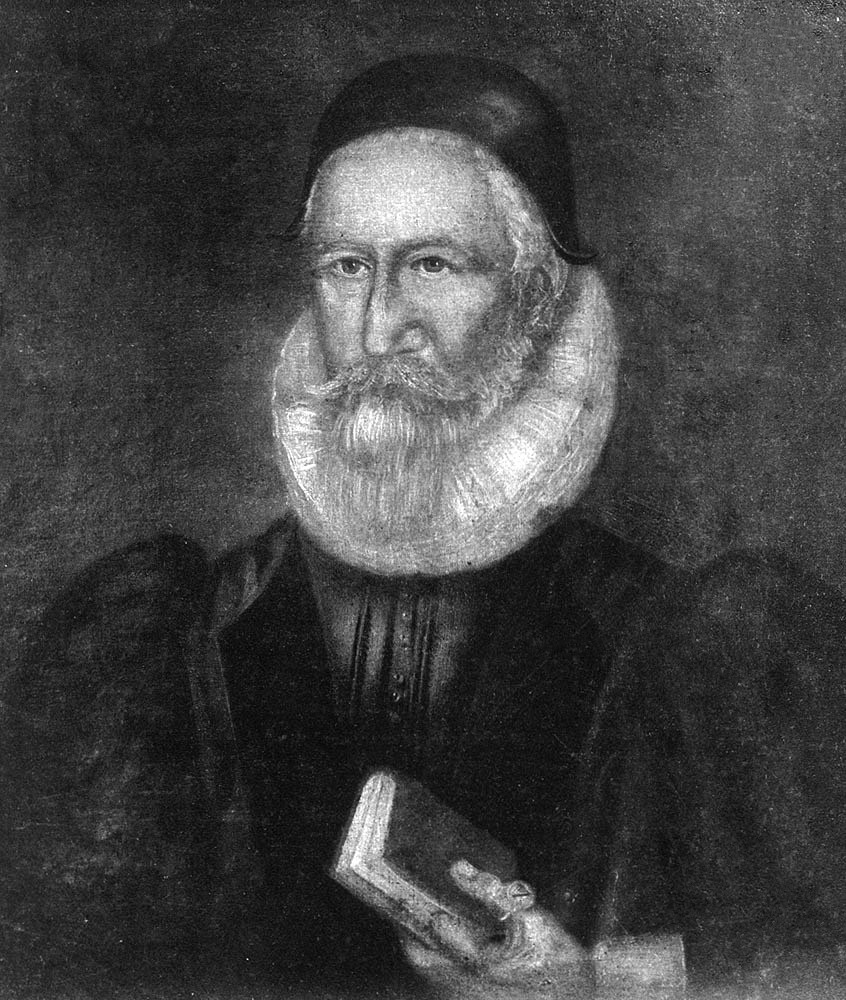
Glasgow University has a copy of the Catechism which David Law gave to his brother James Law (pictured).

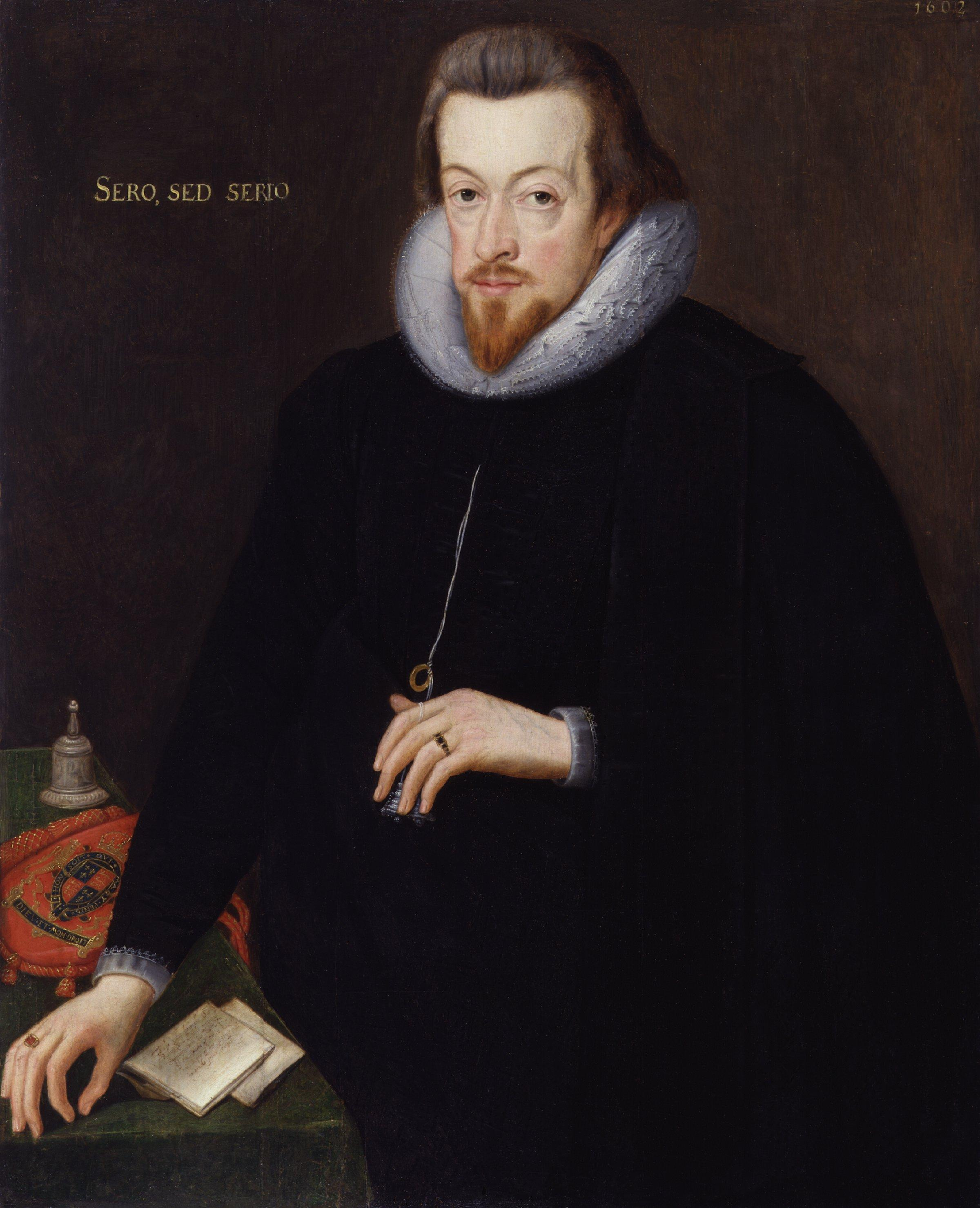
Sir Robert Cecil (pictured) ordered the arrest of Edmund Williamson, who knew the men who killed Christopher Marlowe

Williamson was arrested in Cumberland in March 1595. He had been at Millbeck Hall near Keswick, the home of a namesake cousin, where a family motto "Whither? to live and die, or to die and live" in Latin can still be seen. He was taken to Henry Lee's house in Carlisle. Lee's official positions included steward of the barony of Rockliffe. At or around the same time, David Law, a Scottish seminary priest from Kirkcaldy, was captured and brought to Lee's house. Law was prepared to guide Williamson into Scotland, disguised as his servant. Law was chosen for the mission because he was an acquaintance of Alexander Seton, Lord Urquhart, a significant Scottish courtier and a Catholic. Williamson had been to Scotland before.

Crichton probably obtained an introduction for Williamson to Seton because of his proximity to Anne of Denmark, as an administrator of her estates. Modern scholars (who now refer to her as "Anna of Denmark") consider that the queen had either converted from her native Lutheranism to the Catholic faith, or was regarded as sympathetic to the Catholic cause and possible conversion.

David Law was described as the son of a burgess of Kirkcaldy. His parents were probably Agnes Strang of Balcaskie and James Law, who was also a landowner as a "portioner of Lathrisk" close to Falkland Palace. His brother James Law became Archbishop of Glasgow. James Law's future father-in-law, John Boswell of Balmuto advanced money towards the costs of the royal marriage in 1589. Another Law family home nearby at Kirkcaldy still stands, built by the merchant and shipowner David Law. A mural of a ship is thought to represent the voyage of Anne of Denmark to Scotland. The Angel of Kirkcaldy was certainly among the royal fleet, and perhaps the James of Kirkcaldy, skippered by John Law, and owned by shareholders including Katherine Balcanquell, wife of Alexander Law. Painted ceilings in the house with fruit and flower motifs, like those in some other Scottish interiors including Gladstone's Land, may relate to religious iconography.

David Law hid his breviary in the garden at Henry Lee's house in Carlisle in an attempt to disguise his status as a priest. He was imprisoned in England for a year and a half. He said that William Crichton had brought Williamson to Douai and asked him to escort Williamson, because he had previously mentioned a desire to return to Scotland. Crichton assured him there was little danger because Williamson was going to Lord Home and the court of James VI. After 16 months in prison he wrote a petition for his freedom, describing the pain of his diseased leg. After his release, David Law returned to his studies at Louvain and later joined the Catholic mission in Scotland as a secular priest. He died at Douai from complications after breaking a leg.

Henry Lee relieved Williamson of a gold chain worth £60 and £3-10s in cash, with three rings, two purses, and a sword and pistol. Williamson was taken via Tuxford to the Gatehouse Prison in Westminster and then to the Tower of London, suspected of working with Francis Dacre to convert James VI of Scotland to Catholicism. The aim was to secure a Catholic succession to the throne of England. Williamson admitted to a plan to contact two Scottish aristocrats, Lord Home and the Laird of Buccleuch. As news of the arrest spread, Humphrey Bonner, a former mayor of Nottingham, was criticised for discussing the case on 8 March. It was thought Bonner's careless speech might have harmed the Earl of Shrewsbury.

Williamson talked about "Morton", meaning the Scottish Jesuit Father John Myreton or Myrton, brother of the Laird of Cambo. Myreton was detained at Leith on 23 March 1595, and interviewed by King James VI. He said he was sent from Pope Clement VIII and Cardinal Cajetan. He brought from the Cardinal a chain with a square gold palm-sized jewel, with a carved bone image depicted the crucifixion set beneath crystal. James VI gave the jewel to Anne of Denmark. This gift parallels an earlier incident in June 1566, when an English agent Christopher Rokeby gave a crucifix to Mary, Queen of Scots.

== A tribe of wicked people ==
Richard Topcliffe connected Williamson to George More and Edmund Thurland in June 1595. Thurland was from Gamston near Tuxford and Bawtry, and had lived near Long Longnedham (Leadenham) between Grantham and Lincoln. He had been brought up in, or spent time in Spain with Isabel de Cárdenas, Duchess of Feria. Topcliffe wrote that More and Nicholas Williamson had fled to the enemy, that More was a pensioner of Spain, and the three were in cahoots, in each other's confidence. Thurland's house at Gamston on Idle had been a convenient location for traffic with Scotland on the North Road and the lodgings of Mary, Queen of Scots. The recusant connections of Thurland and the Norton family were described in 1578 as a "trybe of wicked people".

== Williamson's mission and the succession the crown of England ==
During his questioning, Williamson revealed that Robert Persons, Thomas Fitzherbert, Hugh Owen, and Richard Verstegan were the authors or producers of the succession tract, A Conference about the Next Succession to the Crown of England. The Attorney General, Edward Coke, thought that behind Williamson's trip to Scotland was a wider plot to "disable" and hinder James VI and Arbella Stuart from political action, while increasing Catholic support in England for Spain.

Crichton was an active supporter of James VI as a claimant to the throne of England. He may have been reacting to the Conference, a tract nearing publication which advanced the claims of other Catholic candidates to the throne. Williamson's mission included an offer to James VI that Francis Dacre, a grandson of the 4th Earl of Shrewsbury, could muster a force of men on the border to support him in England, should this become useful. The arrest of Williamson and Law was thought to have discouraged Dacre from planning this intervention. Previously, Dacre had visited James VI and Sir John Seton of Barnes, and in 1593 made a plan for Philip II of Spain to conquer England, involving a landing at Kirkcudbright and an invasion of lands in the north of England inhabited by followers of the Dacre family.

James VI had some warning of plots in Scotland at this time. Some "letters of conspiracy" written in Italian and found in Flanders were sent to him by the Estates and arrived in March on the same day as Father Myreton. James VI forwarded copies to Henry IV of France and Elizabeth I on 4 April together with Myreton's papers, so that the conspiracy could not harm his reputation. James Colville, Laird of Easter Wemyss, who had advocated sending copies of the captured documents, sent his cousin, also named James Colville, with the copies to the English ambassador Robert Bowes, who was in London. Some of Crichton's letters concerning Williamson were sent directly to Elizabeth I by Maurice of Nassau.

James VI was receptive to contingency plans which might enable the Union of the Crowns. Following the 1598 visit of Anne of Denmark's brother, the Duke of Holstein, to Scotland, James VI sent David Cunningham, Bishop of Aberdeen and Peter Young to his brother-in-law Christian IV of Denmark and the princes of Lower Saxony. James VI hoped for promises of military support in England in the event of Elizabeth's death. He suggested that Elizabeth was old and in increasingly poor health. News of this embassy made Elizabeth I very angry.

== The house in Cripplegate ==
Nicholas' brother in London, Edmund Williamson, sent news of the arrest in Cumbria to their father at Tusmore. Edmund Williamson was arrested a few days later on 13 March 1595 at the order of Sir Robert Cecil. A number of men were found in the house and detained in the Compter Prison in Wood Street and the Poultry Compter. Richard Martin allowed Edmund's wife, Anna Williamson (née Trafford, from Bridge Trafford), and her servant Margaret Markham to stay in the house. Another brother, James Williamson, was questioned in the Wood Street Compter, and confessed that Nicholas Williamson had written to him from Calais, asking him to meet him in the north.

Richard Martin discovered that Edmund Williamson ran a kind of pawnbroking business from his house in Philip Lane, Cripplegate, obtaining luxury goods from young men for small sums, less than their worth. Nicholas Skeres, an associate of Christopher Marlowe involved in the credit racket, was taken by Martin at Edmund Williamson's house, and held for a few days. Skeres and Ingram Frizer were con-men, practicing the kind of swindles which inspire Thomas Middleton's city comedy Michaelmas Term. Richard Martin felt these more trivial activities explained why so many people were rounded up at the house.

== Anne Williamson's house searched for letters ==
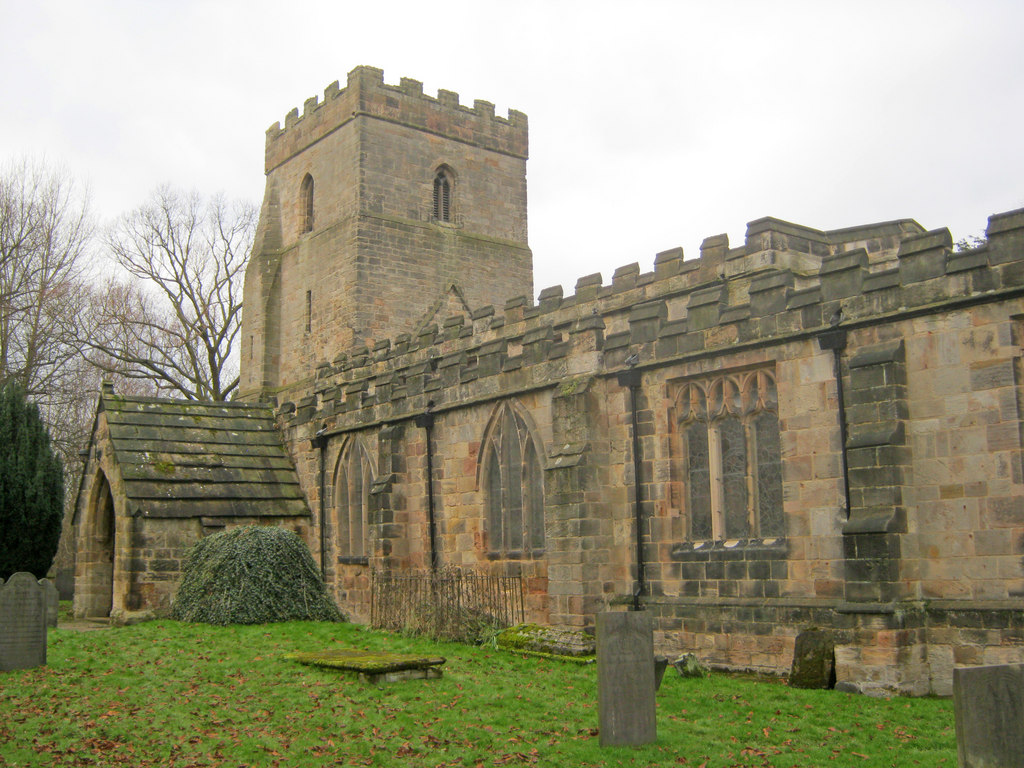
St Chad's at Church Wilne was searched by John Harpur

Anne Williamson remained at their house at Church Wilne in Derbyshire. Despite Anne Williamson's resistance, their family papers were confiscated from the study in her bedchamber, the gallery, and other places at Wilne. At first, she refused access to John Hacker, an agent of the Earl of Shrewsbury. She allowed the house to be searched after discussing in a little parlour with John Harpur how the Earl of Shrewsbury would support her now her husband was imprisoned. Other items and Mass books were hidden in the church tower. John Harpur locked the papers from Wilne in an ark chest in the nearby water mill and then took them to a house of the Earl of Shrewsbury at Sawley. It was discovered that she had left two pillow cases stuffed with documents with a friend, her first-cousin Joanna Pearsall or Peshall at Horsley, Staffordshire. Three further chests had been taken to Williamson's brother's house at Crich. Nicholas Williamson was questioned several times in the Tower. He claimed his wife had no access to papers in his study or closet.

The actions of Earl of Shrewsbury in recovering Williamson's papers were criticised and held to be suspicious. John Harpur of Swarkestone's previous relationship with Nicholas Williamson as a colleague, and his possible leniency during the search at Wilne was called into question. Harpur's wife Isabella was a relation of Elizabeth Pierrepont, who had been an attendant of Mary, Queen of Scots. Their son Henry Harpur bought Calke Abbey in 1622.

== Released from the Tower of London ==
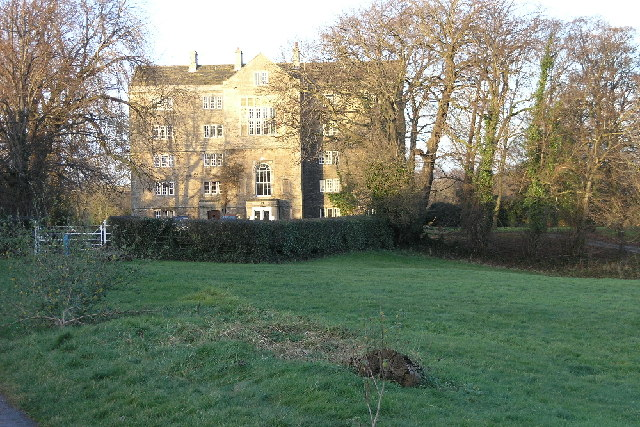
Another servant of the Earl of Shrewsbury, Roger Portington, Ranger of Worksop, lived at the high-status Worksop Manor Lodge

William Cecil called him the "Great Cossenor Williamson" - a cozenor, meaning that he had tried to trick or subvert the Earl of Shrewsbury from his proper allegiance to Elizabeth I. Edward Coke threatened him with "some sharper course". Williamson remained in the Tower and records of payments for his candles and laundry survive.

Robert Cecil offered him a deal. After his release in 1597, Nicholas Williamson deserted Anne. They had previously disagreed, and in 1593 she had spent time away from him with her sister Jane Bolde at Bold. She later married Paul Cuddington. A diplomatic agent in Scotland, George Nicholson mentioned the former prisoner Williamson in passing in a letter of September 1598, as an acquaintance of George More, who had now arrived in Scotland.

== Williamson papers as a source for social history ==
The confiscated Williamson papers survive in the National Archives and include various papers on Shrewsbury business, mentioning other stewards of Shrewsbury family like Roger Portington, ranger of the parks at Worksop. Portington lived at Worksop Manor Lodge, a substantial house of advanced design and an indication of the high social status of some of Shrewsbury's employees. Portington's lodge was even compared to the Medici villa at Pratolino.

Several family letters have been the subject of recent study. Anne Williamson's letter to her husband asking for a farthingale and sleeves to be made for her in the latest style in December 1590 reveals her anxiety related to social status. Correspondence from female writers include letters from her sister Jane Bolde, and from Williamson's sister Bridget, Lady Poole.

== See also ==
- Edmund Ashfield (Catholic agent)
