= John Ingram (martyr) =

English Roman Catholic priest and martyr

Blessed John Ingram

Martyr
- Born: c. 1565; Stoke Edith, Herefordshire
- Died: 26 July 1594 (aged 28 - 29); Gateshead, County Durham
- Venerated in: Catholic Church
- Beatified: 15 December 1929, Rome by Pope Pius XI
- Feast: 26 July

John Ingram (1565 – 26 July 1594) was an English Jesuit and martyr from Stoke Edith, Herefordshire, who was executed in Gateshead on 26 July 1594, during the reign of Elizabeth I.

== Life ==
Ingram was probably the son of Anthony Ingram of Wolford, Warwickshire, by Dorothy, daughter of Sir John Hungerford. Ingram is often confused with another John Ingram from Thame in Oxfordshire who attended New College Oxford. For this reason Ingram of Wolford is sometimes listed as one of the “Oxford Martyrs”. This conflation of the identities of the two men seems to have started in Carles Dodd's "Church History" of 1739, copied into Bishop Richard Challoner's Memoirs of Missionary Priests in 1741, and repeated without challenge in subsequent publications.

John Ingram left England aged around 17 years and traveled to Douai. After introductory training he, with three other young men, was sent to the Rheims to study under William Allen. This venture was not without incident. They were waylaid and held to ransom by a troop of Calvinist mercenaries in the pay of Francis, Duke of Anjou. The first mention of Ingram is in a letter from William Allen, Principal at Rheims, to the rector of the English College in Rome:

Even at the very moment of my writing to you bad tidings come of four young students. On their way to this college from Douai, they were robbed, and are still held captive, by the soldiery of my lord, the brother of his Majesty, and a large sum of money is demanded of us for their ransom. Meanwhile the soldiers are dragging their unhappy victims from town to town, and from province to province, in the direction of their camp in Belgium. God knows how much we shall have to pay to redeem them, for letters from the Mayor and Corporation of Rheims in their favour have been entirely without effect”.

However, the four young men, John Ingram, Richard Haward, Thomas Heath and Christopher Haywood, were resilient and resourceful enough to escape their captors and, individually made their way to Rheims, arriving, in states of the utmost destitution, during October and November 1582. In April 1583 John was sent to the newly established Jesuit college at Pont-à-Mousson. The Rector at that time was the Scottish Jesuit Edmund Hay. Hay was the youngest son of the Baillie to the Earl of Erroll, and a relative.

In September 1584 John left Pont-a-Moussin for the English College, Rome, enrolling in the October of that year. On 10 June 1585, he took the oath of commitment to return to England as a Missionary Priest and took minor orders. (There is a record that he received ‘dispensation from any irregularity contracted through schism or heresy’ which suggests that his family may have conformed at least to some degree to the Protestant religion.) John Ingram was ordained priest in the Basilica of St John Lateran on 3 December 1589. He was 24 years of age. He remained at the college for almost two more years before he set off for his mission in September or October 1591.

Ingram traveled to Abbeville in France, then doubled back to Brussels where he said Mass in a secret chapel run by the Jesuits, and thence to Antwerp where he visited the Carthusian church and said Mass. Here he abandoned his clerical garb and dressed as a layman. This circuitous route seems to have taken some months, possibly to obscure his intentions, and identity, from the network of spies maintained by the English Government to the channel ports, always on the lookout for priests and other persons of interest, so that upon arrival in England they could be arrested, or put under surveillance to lead the authorities to other Catholic sympathizers. He seems to have left Antwerp in the spring of 1592, and sailed, not to England, but to Scotland, landing somewhere between Leith and Dunbar (he refused to say precisely where).

He did not remain in the borders region but traveled to the north-east, not of England as some have assumed, but of Scotland. Ingram's studies in Pont-a-Moussin under Edmund Hay would have provided him with an introduction to Francis Hay, 9th Earl of Errol, who introduced him to the company of George Gordon, 1st Marquess of Huntly, Angus, Abbot of Dumfries, and Sir Walter Lindsay of Balgavies, who had been instrumental in encouraging the other Scottish aristocrats to be more open about their Catholicism. John Ingram lived for 18 months as resident chaplain to the household of Sir Walter Lindsay, in the guise of a steward, ministering to the local faithful. He was said to have converted many people to the faith.

He lived under a number of aliases. However, the reputation and activities of his host, Sir Walter Lindsay, were to be his undoing. There were religious conflicts in Scotland between Catholics and Calvinists, and whilst James VI strove to support some degree of religious tolerance, the conflicts between his subjects threatened his authority and the peace. Sir Walter Lindsay himself had been arrested for subversion in 1589 and imprisoned in Edinburgh Castle. He was conditionally released pending his trial, but when summoned to court Lindsay failed to appear. Denounced as a rebel, in January 1593 he was charged, on pain of rebellion, to appear before and answer to the king and council. He again failed to appear, so the next time the King set off on a Royal Progress he did Sir Walter the courtesy of stopping by with his troops and demolishing his castle. Sir Walter fled to Spain. This triggered rumours that Catholic aristocrats had been conspiring with Spain to invade Scotland, so the Protestant population took up arms against their Catholic neighbours. John Ingram fled south and to evade pursuit, slipped across the English border on 25 November 1593. He rested for some hours at Wark-on-Tweed where he took refreshment at an inn. He then traveled downriver seeking a means to cross back into Scotland but, arousing suspicion, he was apprehended by the English border guards near Norham Castle. Discovered to be in possession of reliquaries, his identity as a priest was suspected and he was taken into custody at Berwick under the authority of the town's governor, John Carew. Strenuous efforts were made by Scottish supporters to secure his release, one laird claiming Ingram as his own son, and others offering the substantial ransom of a thousand crowns for his release. However this only confirmed the English belief that they had captured someone of significant importance, and whilst John Carew may have considered accepting the ransom, Sir William Cecil, who had succeeded Francis Walsingham as Elizabeth's ‘spymaster’, insisted that John Ingram be taken to London for interrogation in the Tower.

He was first imprisoned at Berwick, then moved to Newcastle upon Tyne, then York, and finally to the Tower of London. During this time he wrote Latin epigrams, 20 of which survive.

Ingram arrived at the Tower of London on Holy Saturday, 17 April 1593, and later wrote:

Rocks are quarried, the entrails of the earth,
That Dives may have living rock for his tomb.
No tomb seek I; and yet shall there be a living tomb

For my lifeless body — the carrion-crow.

With dark humour, Ingram indicates that he is well aware of the fate that awaits him, and that the bodies of those so condemned were usually quartered and publicly exposed rather than given a decent burial.

In London he was severely tortured by priest hunter Richard Topcliffe. He was hung by the joints of his fingers and arms, and was in extreme pain for so long that the feeling of his senses was taken completely from him. He was often put to the rack, but would give no information about persons and places.

He was taken from London on 13 July to return to York prison with another Catholic priest, John Boste. The two prisoners' feet were tied under their horse's belly, for fear of them trying to escape. Care was also taken that the horses were kept far enough apart to prevent the prisoners from having any communication with each other throughout the journey. When they arrived in York, Ingram was in solitary confinement in a stinking vault of a locked jakehouse for four days, without either a bed to lie on or a stool to sit on. From York, he was transported to Newcastle and imprisoned in the Newgate prison there for four nights, probably from 19 to 22 July. A woman visitor to the prison was struck by the serenity and joy of the priest, who said that he had good cause to be merry because his wedding day being at hand, the bridegroom must be glad, for within ten days he hoped to enjoy his Spouse. She remarked that it was true his hope was good, but his banquet was deadly; but he answered that the reward was sweet. The serenity and courage of John Ingram is reflected in two letters he wrote from prison to his friends or fellow prisoners in the same prison: "I look for my trial on Thursday and consequently for my death in God's honour ( ...) in my pained body; my spirit is not pained, nor in any disaster, distress or durance."

== Death ==
At Durham Assizes he was tried with John Boste and George Swallowell, a converted Protestant minister. There on 23 July 1594 Ingram and Boste were convicted under the Jesuits, etc. Act 1584 which made the mere presence in England of a priest ordained abroad high treason, even though there was no evidence that Ingram had ever exercised any priestly function in England.

There is evidence that someone in Scotland offered the English Government a thousand crowns to spare Ingram's life, all in vain. Matthew Hutton (1529–1606), the Bishop of Durham, acting for the Crown, preached a sermon before the judges, adjuring them to prosecute with all vigour the law against seminary priests, their aiders and abettors. After the intervention of the Bishop of Durham before the court, the trial was a foregone conclusion and John Ingram, John Boste and a layman George Swallowell, were sentenced to death on Wednesday 24 July. When John Ingram was asked according to the usual formula, what he had to say that he should not receive judgement, he made this answer, "I say that I am a priest, and that my exercise and practice of priesthood cannot be made treason by any Christian law; and I beseech God to forgive both you and them that make it otherways. And I do with all my heart forgive you, and all my accusers and persecutors, and so I beseech God to have mercy upon me, and to strengthen me with patience and constancy in mine agony."

As the authorities in Newcastle were responsible for executions on Tyneside, Ingram was transferred to Newgate Prison in Newcastle and on the day of execution, Friday 26 July, he was taken from the prison across the bridge (now where the Swing Bridge is located) to the scaffold in Gateshead High Street which was directly opposite what was known at the time as the Papist Chapel, the Chapel of St Edmund Bishop and Confessor. Immediately prior to his execution, he was held for a short while in the Toolboth in Gateshead, a small local gaol very close to the place of execution. Holtby gives an account of Ingram's preparations, the prayers he said, his words to the bystanders, and of the execution itself: "I take God and his holy angels to the record, that I die only for the holy Catholic faith and religion, and do rejoice and thank God with all my heart that hath made me worthy to testify my faith therein, by the spending of my blood in this manner."

He was asked to pray for the Queen and he prayed to God that she might long reign to his glory, and that it might please him to procure her to live and die a good Catholic Christian prince. With rope around his neck he said more prayers, ending with the psalm Miserere mei Deus (Have mercy on me, O God), after which, making the sign of the Cross and saying, "In manus tuas" (Into Thy hands I commend my spirit), the ladder was turned; and being dead, he was cut down, bowelled, and quartered. His severed head was placed on a spike and displayed on the bridge across the Tyne. John Ingram was twenty-nine years of age.

The costs of the execution were as follows in Newcastle City Accounts Book: "Paide for charges att the execution of the semynarie priete in Gateside John Ingram – 2 shillings and 6 pence. Paide for hinginge his quarters of the gibbettes: 18 pence and for panyer which brought his quarters to towne 4 pence – 22 pence. Paide for a locke for towlboothe dore in Gateside – 3 shillings 4 pence."

In Rome, at the English College, when the news of his martyrdom reached there, the staff and students sang the Te Deum in the college chapel and wrote against his name "Martyro insigni coronatus".

== Veneration ==
He was beatified in 1929 by Pope Pius XI and his anniversary is 24 July.

=== Blessed John Ingram Commemorative Walk ===
In the 1920s, Father Joseph Starr, who had had a particular devotion to the Gateshead martyr, would retrace Ingrams's route from the location of the prison where he was held to the site of his execution. A few years after the Canonization of the Forty Martyrs of England and Wales in 1970, members of the St Vincent de Paul Society Conference at Corpus Christi Catholic Church in the Bensham area of Gateshead revived this custom to recall John Ingram and promote the cause for his canonization.

Each year, in cooperation with the Anglican Community of Gateshead a commemorative walk in honour of Blessed John Ingram takes place on the Sunday nearest 26 July. The walk commences from St Andrew's Anglican Church in Newcastle, (the former site of Newgate Prison) crosses the Tyne by way of the Swing Bridge (on the site of the Old Tyne Bridge); the route taken by the execution party proceeds to the Anglican church of St Edmund (Holy Trinity Church) on the High Street. At the time of the Protestant Reformation, this church was referred to as "the papist chapel", and the authorities chose to execute John Ingram in front of this chapel, dedicated to St Edmund of Canterbury, as a warning to any Catholics in Tyneside.

Paul J. Zielinski, of St. Augustine's, Felling, Tyne and Wear has written a book, John Ingram Priest and Martyr 1565-1594, which discusses the effect of the Protestant Reformation on Tyneside.

== See also ==
- Catholic Church in the United Kingdom
- Douai Martyrs
