= Marion Ogilvy =

Marion Ogilvy (c. 1495–1575) was the mistress of Cardinal David Beaton, an advisor of James V of Scotland.

== Early life ==
Marion Ogilvy was the younger daughter of Sir James Ogilvy of Lintrathen and Janet Lyle (d. 1525). Ogilvy, a diplomat, was created Lord Ogilvy of Airlie by James IV of Scotland in 1491. Her mother was Airlie's 4th wife, and possibly a daughter of Robert, 2nd Lord Lyle, of Renfrewshire, another of the King's diplomats. As a child she lived at Airlie Castle and her family's lodging in Arbroath. She had an older sister, Janet Ogilvy, and a much older half-brother, John Ogilvy, who became the 2nd Lord Ogilvy.

Her father had made only partial provision for her before his death, a marriage contract by which the heir of Gordon of Midmar would marry her elder sister Janet or, on her death, Marion. Janet appears to have died young but the contract was not implemented. In 1525 Marion as yet unmarried, served as executrix of her mother's estate.

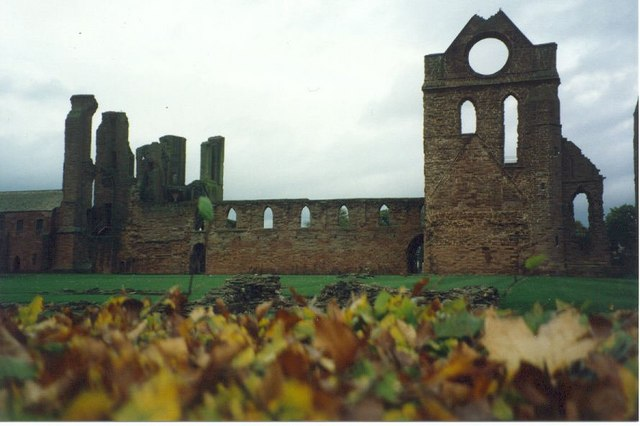
Arbroath Abbey

== Life with David Beaton ==
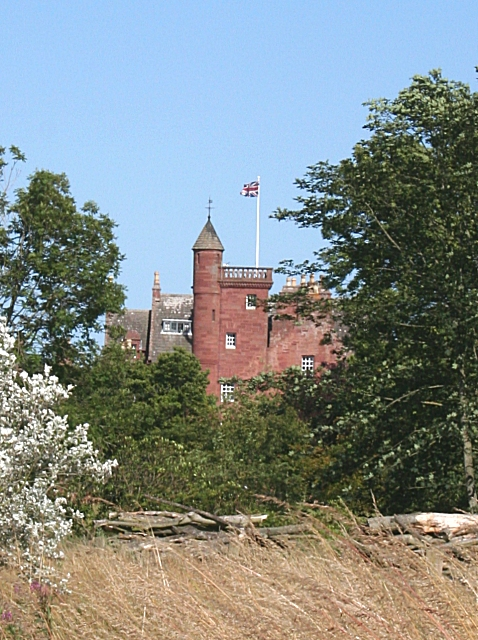
Ethie Castle

Her association with David Beaton, then abbot of Arbroath, may have begun around 1525, when she wound up her late mother's affairs at Airlie. Marion is recorded in Edinburgh with David Beaton in February 1526, and after she lived at Beaton's Ethie Castle near Arbroath. Beaton's relationship with Marion is often cited as one of his faults, as a Catholic clergyman supposed to remain celibate. However, Beaton's clerical status was complicated. He was not a monk, or professed member of the Benedictine Order, though Abbot or Commendator of Arbroath Abbey. Neither was he in full priest's orders at the start of their relationship. At this time clergymen who pursued secular careers as royal administrators and diplomats were able to postpone their ordination by seeking permission from the Pope. Despite these reservations, the historian Margaret Sanderson sees their relationship as example of clerical concubinage which Beaton himself condemned in others. In her biography Cardinal of Scotland, Sanderson discusses the issue at greater length and points out that all their eight children were born before he was fully ordained, which presumably occurred at the time his consecration as Bishop of Mirepoix in 1538. The Cardinal's relationship with Marion seems not to have become a specific target of his critics or an embarrassment to his apologists until the 19th century.

Ogilvy built up considerable property, held from the abbey, and frequently appeared in court to defend her rights. One of her incomes was the rents of the Kirktoun of St Vigeans.

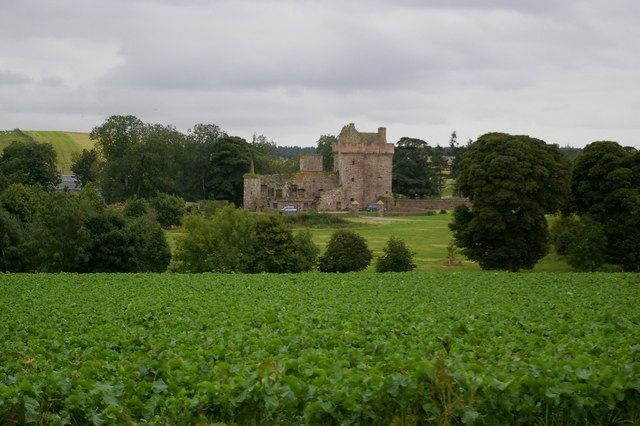
Melgund Castle

In 1543, David Beaton bought Melgund Castle from his widowed sister-in-law. The castle became Marion's home. A chamber in the new tower has their heraldry displayed over the windows, just as any landed married couple. The Cardinal was killed at St Andrews Castle in 1546. According to John Knox, Marion had just left the castle by the privy postern before it was overwhelmed by Beaton's enemies. In 1547, Marion married a William Douglas, but was a widow by 18 September 1547.

Marion died at Melgund in June 1575 and was buried in the Ogilvy aisle at Kinnell parish church.

== The Cardinal's children ==
Some of the children received royal letters of legitimation in March 1531, and the sons were required Papal dispensations to compensate for their 'defect of birth' before starting careers in the church.

- Margaret Beaton, who married David Lindsay, 10th Earl of Crawford, in 1546, her children included Henry Lindsay, 13th Earl of Crawford
- Elizabeth Beaton (d. 1574), married Alexander Lindsay of Vayne
- George Beaton, died young.
- David Beaton of Melgund, married Margaret Lindsay, daughter of Lord Lindsay of the Byres. He was a Master of Household to King James and Anne of Denmark. He married secondly Lucretia Beaton, daughter of Robert Beaton of Creich and Jeane de la Rainville. Lucretia was the sister of Mary Beaton, the attendant of Mary Queen of Scots.
- James Beaton (d. 1560), parson of Govan
- Alexander Beaton of Hospitalfield, Archdeacon of Lothian, who married Margaret Allardyce, his son was David Beaton of Carsgownie.
- John Beaton of Spittalfield (alive, 1557)
- Agnes Beaton (died 1602), married (1) James Ochterlonie of Kellie. (2) Alexander (or George) Gordon of Gight, their daughter Elizabeth Gordon married George Home, 1st Earl of Dunbar and was the ancestor of the Earls of Home and Suffolk. (3) Sir Patrick Gordon of Auchindoun.

== The will of Marion Ogilvy ==
Marion's will mentions the value of her sheep, cattle, and crops at her farms at the Mains of Melgund, and at Chapelton and Brinton of Ethie north of Arbroath. She had £1000 Scots in cash. Her servants included the cook Robert Smith, Alexander Symson, Thomas Lyne foreman of Melgund, Isobel Greg and Katherine Bell. She gave money to Willie Haghous, the son of Jonet Haghous, to apprentice him to a craft.
