= David Beaton of Melgund =

Scottish courtier and landowner

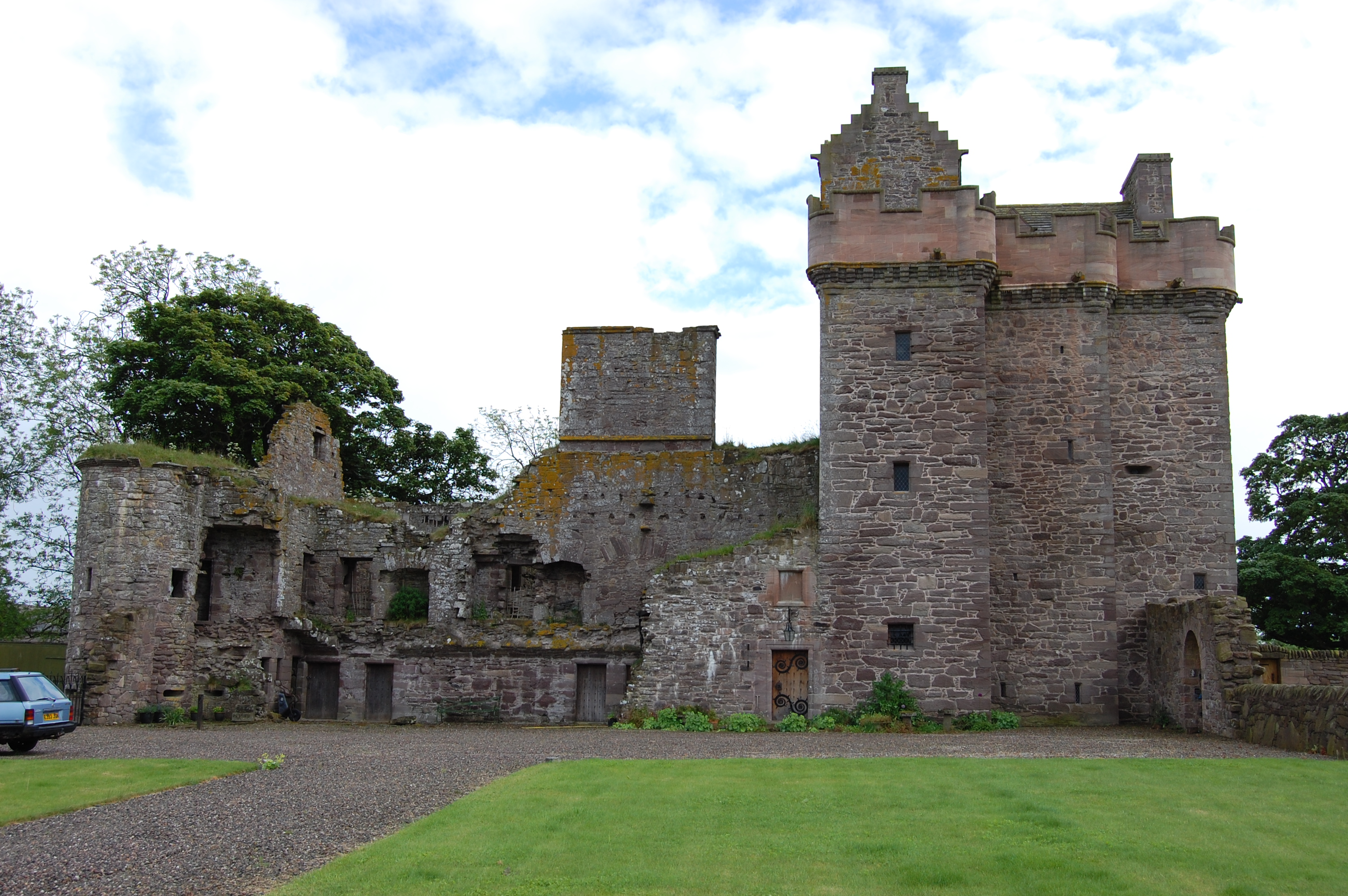
Melgund Castle

David Beaton of Melgund (died 1598) was a Scottish courtier and landowner.

== Career ==
David Beaton was the son of Cardinal David Beaton and Marion Ogilvy. He inherited Melgund Castle.

Beaton was appointed as a steward or cupbearer in the household of Mary Queen of Scots. In June 1562, Mary requested a "safe conduct", a kind of passport, for Beaton to travel to and from France through England. The English diplomat in Scotland, Thomas Randolph wrote that he was going to represent the queen at the christening of Marie (1562-1623), the daughter of Sébastian de Luxembourg, Vicomte de Martigues. Martigues had fought at the siege of Leith.

On 5 August 1586 he wrote from Dundee to Charles de Prunelé, Baron d'Esneval, a French envoy currently in Scotland, who he had received at court in February and was now about to leave Scotland. D'Esneval had commissioned a copy of a portrait of James VI from a painter in Edinburgh, probably Adrian Vanson, at the request of Mary Queen of Scots.

Beaton was Master of the Household for James VI of Scotland from 1583, and also for Anne of Denmark and audited her household accounts. This position was not as lucrative as he hoped, and in 1592 with a cousin and fellow Master of Household to the queen, Harry Lindsay of Careston, he complained about their arduous roles and low wage compared to other officers, and missing allowances for the meals of ladies in waiting and other courtiers.

== Family ==
David Beaton of Melgund first married Margaret Lindsay, third daughter of the John, 5th Lord Lindsay of the Byres (d. 1563). In 1575, he married Lucretia Beaton (d. 1623), daughter of Robert Beaton of Creich and Jeane de la Ramvell (d. 1577). Lucretia was the sister of Mary Beaton, the attendant of Mary Queen of Scots and a maid of honour in the royal household. Their children included:

- James Beaton (d. August 1609), feuar of Melgund from 1586, who married Margaret or Helen Menzies, daughter of James Menzies of that ilk (d. 1585) and Barbara Stewart. A stone with their heraldry dated 1604 is built into the wall of Aberlemno church.
- Dr David Beaton, physician.
- Christian Beaton. In 1599 her brother, James Beaton of Melgund, undertook to pay her dowry.
- Elizabeth Beaton, who married, in 1602, Alexander Abercromby, later grand falconer to Charles I.

Lucretia Beaton had been a maid of honour to Mary, Queen of Scots, until Carberry Hill. After David Beaton's death, Lucretia Beaton married Andrew Wishart of Mylneden.
