= Drumkilbo =

Stately home in Perth and Kinross, Scotland

Coordinates: 56.5907°N 3.1351°W

Designations

Inventory of Gardens and Designed Landscapes in Scotland
- Official name: Drumkilbo
- Designated: 30 June 1987
- Reference no.: GDL00142

Drumkilbo House is a listed stately home and garden near Meigle, Perth and Kinross, Scotland.

== Location ==
Drumkilbo is located on the edge of the village of Meigle, about ten miles east of Blairgowrie, and adjacent to the estate of Glamis Castle.

== History ==
The first recorded owner of Drumkilbo was Robert the Bruce; he passed it to his liegeman Morice de Tiry in about 1300. For 300 years it was the home of the Tyree family, including Jesuit theologian James Tyrie (1543–1597), and Sir Thomas Tyree, race horse owner and associate of Charles I of England. In 1650 it became the property of the Nairne family. Lord Wharncliffe purchased Drumkilbo in about 1851; he sold it to Edward Cox in 1900. The Cox family at that time were the leading proprietors of the jute industry in Dundee. In 1951 Drumkilbo was sold to the 17th Lord Elphinstone, whose nephew inherited it in 1975, and sold off much of the estate in 1984.

== Architecture ==
Drumkilbo, including the walled garden, is a category B listed building. The house itself is mid 19th century Georgian with a 13th-century stone spiral staircase at its core. Additions were made in 1920 to designs by Sir Robert Lorimer. It has sixteen acres of landscaped grounds, which are included on the Inventory of Gardens and Designed Landscapes in Scotland, a list of nationally significant parks.

== Cultural connections ==
Drumkilbo has been used as a filming location, including for an episode of The Beechgrove Garden.

It gives its name to Eggs Drumkilbo, a dish of hard-boiled eggs with lobster and prawns, reportedly the favourite savoury dish of Queen Elizabeth the Queen Mother.
