= Thomas Morison (physician) =

Scottish physician and diplomat

- Born: 1558? Aberdeen
- Died: 1603?
- Occupations: Physician and diplomat

Thomas Morison (1558?–1603?) was a Scottish physician and diplomat.

== Biography ==
Morison was born about 1558 it is said, in Aberdeen, but the statement is only based on the epithet 'Aberdonanus' or 'Aberdonnus' which Morison applies to himself. He may have been educated at Aberdeen, and Tanner calls him 'medicinæ doctor in academia Aberdonensi,' but his name does not appear in the published records. Like many of his countrymen (cf. Preface to Fasti Aberdonenses, Spalding Club), Morison studied at Montpellier, whence he probably took his degree of M.D. It was possibly during Anthony Bacon's visit to Montpellier in 1582 that Morison made his acquaintance. Morison was probably at Arras in December 1592, for in a letter to Bacon he gives a remarkably minute account of the death of Alexander Farnese, which occurred there on 2 December. From that date until Bacon's death in 1601 Morison seems to have frequently corresponded with him, but few of his letters are preserved.

Early in 1593 Morison appears to have been at Frankfort, where he published his first book, Liber novus de Metallorum causis et Transubstantione (Frankfurt: Ioannem Wechelum, 1593). It is dedicated to James VI, and directed against alchemists and astrologers. The book mentions the purity of gold found in Scotland. In the same year Morison returned to Scotland, and through Bacon's influence became one of Essex's 'earliest, as well as most considerable, intelligencers there' (Birch). During a visit to the north of Scotland he fell in with the Earl of Huntly, and secured considerable influence with him, which Morison thought might be of use to the queen's envoys. Elizabeth appears to have been quite satisfied with Morison's services, which were well rewarded with money. In August 1593 he received 30l from Bacon; Essex sent him a hundred crowns in September, and another hundred in March 1593–4. On 5 February 1594, Morison dedicated to James his second book, Papatus, seu depravatæ religionis Origo et Incrementum (Edinburgh, 1594). In spite of its fanciful alphabetical arrangement, it is a learned work, compiled from more than two hundred authors, and tracing the history of the papacy from its origin to the Reformation. It is quoted in Ussher's Historia Dogmatica, p. 271, and "is now of rare occurrence, and highly prized by the learned for its singular erudition".

In 1594, Morison appears to have visited London and had an interview with Essex. Next year he was back again in Scotland sending accounts to his patron of James's behaviour and views on domestic and foreign policy, and describing the movements of Huntly, Erroll, Angus, and a Jesuit, John Morton or Myreton, who had been Morison's schoolfellow. Myreton, a brother of the laird of Cambo in Fife, brought a jewel to Scotland in 1595. After Anthony's death, in 1601, Francis Bacon seems to have maintained a correspondence with Morison. In 1603 he wrote soliciting Morison's interest with James, who was then about to take possession of his English crown. Probably Morison's death occurred soon after. Dempster dates it 1601, but this is obviously a mistake.
