= Melgund Castle =

Coordinates: 56°41′48.44″N 2°44′32.02″W

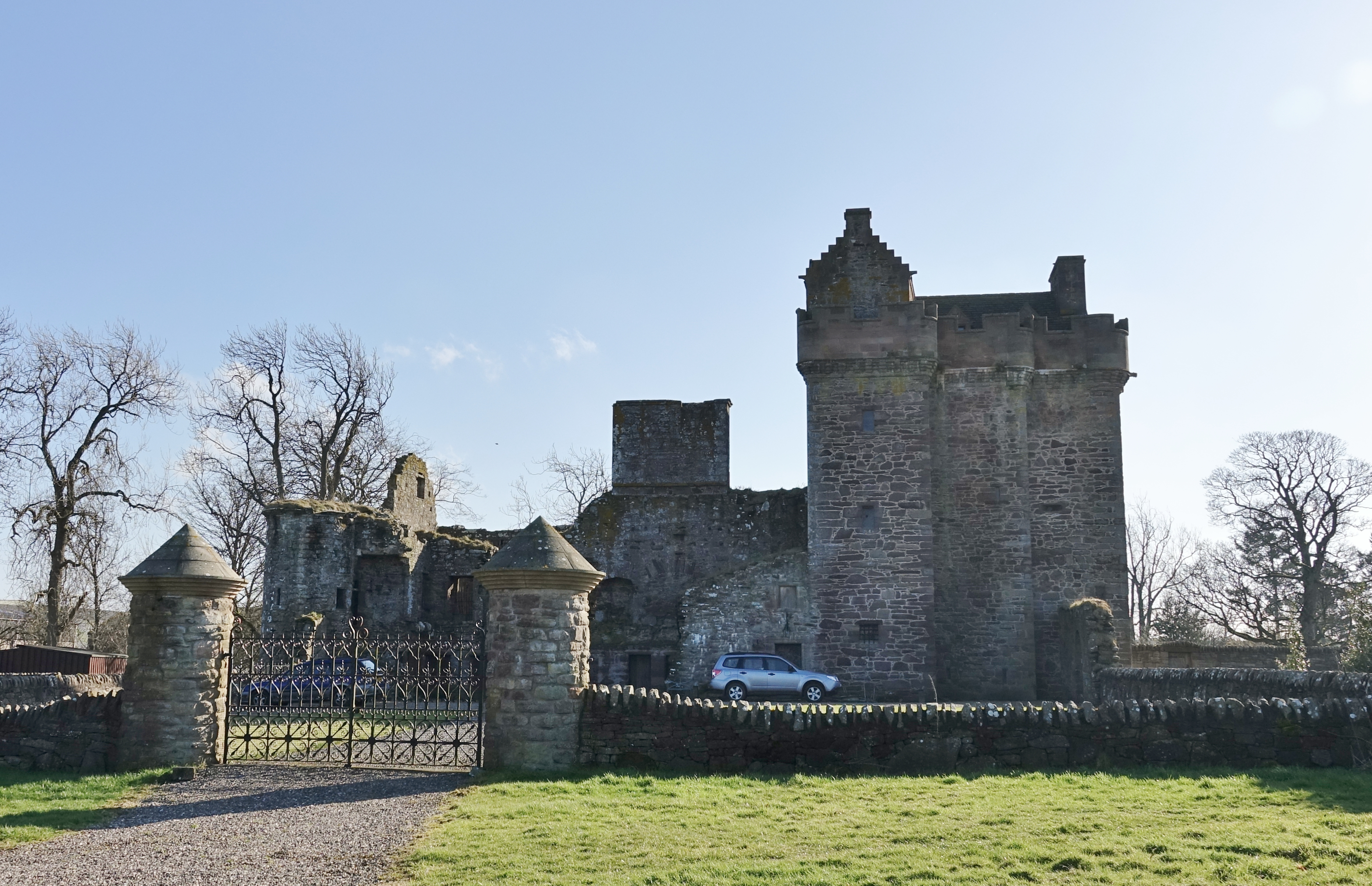
- The castle in 2022
- Interactive map of Melgund Castle

Melgund Castle, lying around two kilometres (1.2 mi) due east of Aberlemno in Angus, Scotland, is a 16th-century L-plan castle which has been partially restored as a private residence. It was designated as a scheduled monument in 1971.

== History ==
The land was initially held by the Cramonds, but by 1525 it was in the hands of Patrick Annand, whose daughter Janet passed it onto her husband, James Bethune, son of John Bethune, 6th of Balfour, and elder brother of Cardinal David Beaton. James had no children with Janet and, when he died in 1542, the estate was sold to David, who made it one of the many homes for his mistress Marion Ogilvy and their growing family. He started improving the castle and in 1543, he bought timber for the building works from William Mayne, a merchant in St Andrews, and had it shipped to Arbroath. After his assassination in 1546, Melgund passed to his eldest son, David Beaton of Melgund, who may have made further improvements. It was much later passed on by marriage to the Earls of Minto, who were granted the title Viscount Melgund, presently used by the heir to the earldom. It remained in the family until it was sold in 1990.

The castle was extensively investigated by archaeologists between 1990 and 1996 in preparation for its partial conversion into a residence. The work was completed in August 2002, mostly using local materials which included stone from a specially re-opened quarry nearby. The domestic range to the east of the keep has been retained in its ruined state and the primary exterior difference is the new roof to the keep. The restoration by Benjamin Tindall Architects has been called, "Perhaps the best Tower House project of the last 20 years" by the Royal Incorporation of Architects in Scotland.

== Description ==
The castle was built "in imitation of a 15th century keep with 16th century additions", although it may have incorporated earlier structures. It comprised a four-storey keep with an attic and a stair tower that appears to have been raised to act as a watchtower. Its two-storey domestic range on the east had a round tower at the north-east corner. One lintel has a carved shield with the initials D.B.

== See also ==
- Restoration of castles in Scotland
