= David Lindsay, 12th Earl of Crawford =

Scottish nobleman

David Lindsay, 12th Earl of Crawford (1577–1620) was a Scottish nobleman.

== Life ==
David Lindsay was born in Crawford, Lanarkshire, Scotland. He was the son of David Lindsay, 11th Earl of Crawford and Griselda Stewart, daughter of John Stewart, 4th Earl of Atholl.

On 25 October 1605 he slew, "under trust", his kinsman, Sir Walter Lindsay of Balgavie. On this account he was "placed at the horn", but succeeded in eluding capture, owing, it would appear, to the remissness of the Privy Council, who were on 10 October rebuked by King James VI. In revenge for the murder Crawford was, on 5 July 1607, while accompanied by Alexander, Lord Spynie, attacked by the relatives of Sir Walter, who killed Spynie in the brawl and wounded Crawford.

On 10 May 1608, Crawford appeared before the council and took the oath of allegiance, but was subsequently, on many occasions, proceeded against for his lawless proceedings. Ultimately his relatives, to prevent further alienations of the estates, placed him under surveillance in Edinburgh Castle, where he died in February 1621. The earldom passed to his uncle, Sir Henry Lindsay of Kinfauns.

Thomas Henderson wrote in the Dictionary of National Biography that "In David Lindsay, ... the prodigality and lawlessness, which had more or less characterised the descendants of the 'wicked master', reached their climax".

== Family ==
Crawford married Jean Kerr, daughter of Mark Kerr, 1st Earl of Lothian on 16 April 1610. Before they divorced, they had a daughter, Jean, who eloped with a public herald—a "jockey with the horn"—and latterly became a beggar.

== Notes ==
Attribution

- This article incorporates text from a publication now in the public domain: Henderson, Thomas Finlayson (1893). "Lindsay, David (1547?-1607)". In Lee, Sidney (ed.). Dictionary of National Biography. Vol. 33. London: Smith, Elder & Co. pp. 295–297.

Peerage of Scotland
Preceded by David Lindsay	Earl of Crawford; 1607–1620	Succeeded by Henry Lindsay
