= Alexander Lindsay, 1st Lord Spynie =

16th-17th century Scottish noble

Arms of Lindsay of Spynie: Quarterly: 1st & 4th: Gules, a fess chequy argent and azure, a label of three argent (for Lindsay) 2nd & 3rd: Or, a lion rampant gules debruised by a ribbon in bend sable (for Abernethy)

Alexander Lindsay, 1st Lord Spynie (died 5 June 1607) was a Scottish nobleman. His death is the subject of the ballad Lord Spynie.

== Early life ==
Lindsay was the fourth son of David Lindsay, 10th Earl of Crawford, by his wife Margaret Beaton, daughter of Cardinal Beaton, and was a younger brother of David Lindsay, 11th Earl of Crawford. At an early age he became one of the favourites of James VI of Scotland, and was chosen to be vice-chamberlain of his household. He was described as "the King's minion and only conceit" and his "nightly bedfellow".

Helen Huntar, the wife of Alan Lentroun in St Andrews, was said to have committed adultery with Lindsay and his brother, David Lindsay, 11th Earl of Crawford.

== Courtier ==
In October 1589, he accompanied the king when he went to Denmark to bring home his bride, Anne of Denmark. Lindsay lent a thousand crowns to the king, who promised on his return "to make him a lord". James wrote a note for "Sandie" to this effect at the castle of Kronborg. Lindsay received 500 gold crowns worth four merks each from King James VI in 1590, bought with money from the English subsidy.

On 6 May 1590, Lindsay received a charter of Spynie and other lands belonging to the see of Moray, which were erected into the barony of Spynie, together with the title of Baron Spynie, which was conferred on him and his heirs and assignees, the creation being confirmed on 4 November 1589. Lord Spynie, after his marriage to Jean Lyon, took up residence at Aberdour Castle. He hosted James VI and Anne of Denmark at Aberdour at the end of December 1590.

Lord Spynie was one of the new members of the privy council, chosen after the reconstitution of the council in June 1592. On 15 August 1592 following he was accused by Colonel William Stewart of having harboured the turbulent Francis Stewart, 5th Earl of Bothwell at Aberdour Castle. Spynie offered to fight the accuser, but the king would not permit this, and after a day had been appointed for the trial, Stewart was committed to Edinburgh Castle or Blackness Castle (sources differ), and Spynie to Stirling Castle. At the trial the accuser failed to make a case and Spynie was set free; but Spynie never regained the king's entire confidence. When, on 24 July 1593, Bothwell made his appearance before the king at Holyrood Palace, Spynie was one of those who interceded for him. On 27 December 1594 he was denounced for not appearing to answer charges; and on 24 February following proclamation was made against holding intercourse with him and "other adherents of Bothwell".

Spynie made his peace with the king, and on 27 November 1595 was present at a meeting of the privy council, but their relations were never again quite cordial. On 18 November 1599 he had to promise the council to present Sir Walter Lindsay of Balgavie, a papal emissary, before the presbytery of Edinburgh, and was ordered to reside where they directed him until he satisfied them in reference to his religion.

In 1600 a quarrel erupted between Lord Spynie and the Ogilvies which, though the council tried settle it, ultimately resulted on 26 November 1602 in a night attack by the Master of Ogilvie and his brother and 100 armed followers on the house of Lord Spynie at Kinblethmont. After blowing up the principal gate, including the yett, with a petard and firing cannon or "field pieces" at the windows, the assailants entered the house with cocked pistols and drawn weapons. They searched the house for Lord Spynie and his wife, but they had left two hours before. Finding they had escaped, the Ogilvies looted the mansion. James VI proclaimed on 1 December that the petard was such that "no man of whatsoever rank and calling can assure his own safety and preservation within his own house and iron yetts" and so any petards should be surrendered on pain of death.

On the revival of the ancient bishopric of Moray in 1605, Spynie, at the request of the king, resigned the temporalities, but the patronage of the living was reserved to the family.

== Death ==
While, on 5 June 1607, at the foot of the stair of his lodgings in the High Street of Edinburgh, Spynie was witness to an encounter between his kinsmen, David Lindsay, 12th Earl of Crawford, and David Lindsay of Edzell, eldest brother of Walter Lindsay of Balgavie who had been murdered by Crawford. He endeavoured to interpose to prevent bloodshed and was slain by the young laird of Edzell by mistake. The incident was told inaccurately in the old ballad Lord Spynie.

== Family ==
The king used his influence to induce Dame Jean Lyon, daughter of John Lyon, 8th Lord Glamis, and widow first of Sir Robert Douglas, Master of Morton, and secondly of Archibald Douglas, 8th Earl of Angus, to agree to give Lord Spynie her hand in marriage, writing letters to both parties to urge their marriage. They had two sons, Alexander Lindsay, 2nd Lord Spynie, and John who died young, and two daughters, Anne, married to Sir Robert Graham of Invermay, and Margaret, to John Erskine of Dun.

The English ambassador Robert Bowes described Jean Lyon in 1592 as the "late lady and mistress of Arderyre", meaning John Lumsden of Airdrie, who was a supporter of the rebel Earl of Bothwell.

Peerage of Scotland
New creation	Lord Spynie; 1590–1607	Succeeded by Alexander Lindsay
