= Treaty of Berwick (1586) =

1586 peace treaty between England and Scotland

The Treaty of Berwick was a 'league of amity' or peace agreement made on 6 July 1586 between Queen Elizabeth I of England and King James VI of Scotland, after a week of meetings at the Tolbooth in Berwick upon Tweed.

The English diplomat Thomas Randolph was sent to Scotland in February 1586 to commence negotiations on the proposed articles. His mission was opposed in the Scottish court by the French ambassador, the Baron d'Esneval, and Monsieur de Courcelles, the secretary of the French ambassador in London, but his cause was helped by the banishing of James Stewart, Earl of Arran.

Represented by Edward Manners, 3rd Earl of Rutland (for the English) and Francis Stewart, soon to be Earl of Bothwell (for the Scots), the two countries signed a mutual defensive alliance pact to guarantee aid should an invasion of either homeland take place. The two largely Protestant countries were threatened from abroad by the Catholic powers, Spain and France.

Some believe Elizabeth only entered into the agreement to soften the blow of her next political move - the execution of James' mother, Mary, Queen of Scots. For James, his motivation was the chance of succeeding to the English throne upon Elizabeth's death. A part of the agreement ensured James would receive an annual pension of £4,000 from the English state, which led many to assume Elizabeth already considered James as an heir to her throne. James would succeed to the English throne in 1603.

James VI issued a proclamation on 5 July declaring extra penalties against cross-border raiders for the next forty days. A surviving paper indicates that the Scottish commissioners were to discuss a closer alliance beyond the twelve articles of the league; with an agreement for mutual redress against piracy, the people of Scotland might be made denizens of England and vice versa, so custom duties between England and Scotland would be abolished. The same arrangement existed between Scotland and France. Randolph had already indicated that this matter could not be included in Berwick articles.

== See also ==
- List of treaties
