= James Tyrie =

James Tyrie (1543 in Drumkilbo, Perthshire, Scotland – 27 May 1597 in Rome, Italy) was a Scottish Jesuit theologian.

== Life ==
Educated first at St. Andrews, he joined Edmund Hay at the time of de Gouda's mission in 1562. In his company he then went to Rome, was there admitted into the Society of Jesus, and was eventually sent to Clermont College, Paris, in June, 1567, where Hay had become rector; and remained there in various posts, e.g. professor, head of the Scottish Jesuit Mission (1585), till 1590.

During this period he was once engaged in a controversy with John Knox, against whom he wrote The Refutation of ane Answer made be Schir Johne Knox to ane letter be James Tyrie (Paris, 1573). Next year he discussed several points of religion with Andrew Melville privately in Paris.

In 1585 he was summoned to Rome as the representative of France on the Committee of Six, who eventually drew up Claudio Acquaviva's first edition of the "Ratio Studiorum", printed in 1586. He was rector of Clermont College during the great siege of Paris (May to September, 1590). He had over a hundred scholars as well as a large community to feed, at a time when men were dying with hunger in the streets. After the Duke of Parma had revictualled the town (September), Tyrie was again sent to Rome, as French deputy for the congregation, which finally supported the government of Acquaviva.

On his return in December, Tyrie was sent to the University of Pont-à-Mousson, as professor of Scripture and head of the Scots College, and two years later, on the successive deaths of Edmund Hay and Paul Hoffaeus, he was again called to Rome (22 May 1592), where he became Assistant for France and Germany, and played his part in the Sixth General Congregation of the Society of Jesus (1593).

He also supported at Rome the vain endeavours in Scotland of the Catholic Earl of Huntly, Earl of Erroll, and Earl of Angus to maintain themselves, with King James VI of Scotland's connivance, by force of arms against the Kirk (1594). The earls asked and obtained a subsidy from Pope Clement VIII; and Tyrie's advice and opinion were constantly taken by both the papal and the Scottish negotiators. He also took steps to restore the Scottish hospital at Rome, which eventually (1600) became the Scots College there.

Rare as it was to keep on good terms with adversaries in those days, Tyrie won praise from such men as David Buchanan, both for his ability and for his courtesy. Part of his cursus is preserved in manuscript at the Bibliothèque Nationale, Paris.

== Bibliography ==
Attribution
