= James Gordon (Jesuit) =

Scottish Jesuit

James Gordon (1541 – 16 April 1620) was a Scottish Jesuit. He is sometimes known as James Gordon Huntly, to distinguish him from James Gordon (1553–1641), another Jesuit.

== Life ==
He was the fifth son of George Gordon, 4th Earl of Huntly, by Elizabeth Keith, Countess of Huntly, eldest daughter of Robert, Lord Keith, and sister of William Keith, 4th Earl Marischal. He was persuaded to join the Jesuit mission by the papal emissary Nicolas de Gouda. He entered the Society of Jesus at Rome on 20 September 1563, and taught philosophy, theology, sacred scripture, and Hebrew in the colleges of the order at Pont-à-Mousson, Paris, and Bordeaux.

In 1584 William Crichton and Gordon were sent on a mission to Scotland. Their vessel was seized on the high seas by the Dutch. The ship was released; but the merchant who had hired her for the voyage, having discovered that his two passengers were priests, accused them as enemies, and the Dutch detained them. The merchant was concerned about the attitude of the Earl of Huntly, Gordon's nephew, and Gordon was set free after the substitution of a secular priest in his place.

On arriving in Scotland Gordon, as a kinsman of King James VI, had influence among the nobility; and he engaged in public discussions with Protestant ministers. For two months he followed the king everywhere else in hope of finding an opportunity to convert him to Catholicism. He then went to the north of Scotland, where he held a public discussion on matters of faith with George Hay and made converts including Francis Hay, 9th Earl of Erroll. In 1585 other Jesuits arrived, Edmund Hay and John Durie. Reporting to Francis Walsingham on 18 October 1585, Thomas Rogers wrote that the Jesuits were announcing progress on conversions, and were still aiming to make the king a Catholic. The situation changed with the return of the exiled lords to power.

In February 1588 Gordon held a conference with Protestant ministers in the presence of James at Holyrood Palace. The king determined in 1592 to raise Catholics to power. On the advice of his councillors of state he sent Gordon and Crichton to Rome to arrange with the Pope means of restoring the Catholic religion in Scotland. They returned to Scotland in company with the legate George Sampiretti, landing at Aberdeen on 16 July 1594. James Gordon was at the castle of Bog of Gight on 5 August 1594, and receipted payments from the Papal treasury to the Catholic Earls of Huntly, Erroll, and Angus.

As the popular agitation increased, James changed his mind and resolved that laws against Catholics should be enforced. Gordon was sent into exile in 1595; but he subsequently paid two visits to Scotland in June 1597 and December 1598, still with the object of bringing about the conversion of the king.

Gordon died at the Jesuit college in Paris on 16 April 1620.

== Works ==
Gordon's works are:

- Controversiarum Epitomes, in qua de quæstionibus theologicis hac nostra ætate controversis, breviter disputatur: idque ex sacris præsertim literis, Poitiers, 1612. The second volume, In quo de augustissimo Eucharistiæ Sacramento contra Calvinianos breviter disputatur, appeared at Paris, 1618. They were reprinted by John Kinchius, with a third part, at Cologne, 1620, under the title of Controversiarum Christianæ Fidei adversus hujus temporis Hæreticos Epitome. This work led to the publication by Solomon Glassius of Dicta Jehovæ, Genesis cap. 3, v. 15 (semen tuum, &c.), a J. Gordoni Huntlæi Jesuitæ Scoti φλυαρίαις et interpretamentis vindicata, Jena, 1625.
- Treatise of the Unwritten Word of God, commonly called Traditions, 1614.
- Summary of the Controversies, wherein are briefly treated the cheefe Questions of Divinity, now a Dayes in Dispute betweene Catholikes and Protestants, 1618.
- Tractatus de Censuris et Irregularitatibus, manuscript, once in the library of the Jesuits at Mantua.
- Explanation of the Decree of Gratian, manuscript.

== Notes ==
Attribution

This article incorporates text from a publication now in the public domain: Stephen, Leslie; Lee, Sidney, eds. (1890). "Gordon, James (1541-1620)". Dictionary of National Biography. Vol. 22. London: Smith, Elder & Co.
