= Edmund Hay =

Scottish Jesuit

Edmund Hay (1540? – Rome, 4 November 1591) was a Scottish Jesuit, and envoy to Mary, Queen of Scots.

== Life ==
He was the son of Peter Hay of Megginch (castle still standing), the bailie of Errol, and related to the earl of that title. In 1562 (being already a B. D., probably of Paris University), he was selected to accompany Father Nicolas de Gouda (Floris), S.J., on his mission (June to September, 1562) from Pope Pius IV to Mary, Queen of Scots, then lately returned to Scotland, Hay practically took charge of the mission, and conducted de Gouda amid many dangers to the queen's presence in a small room at Holyrood, while the majority of the court were hearing a Calvinist sermon. He acted as interpreter during the meeting, a full account of which will be found in de Gouda's report.

Before they returned to the continent, Hay had persuaded a small band of young men to accompany him and to offer themselves to the Society. They comprised William Crichton, Robert Abercromby (the future chaplain of Queen Anne of Denmark), James Tyrie, James Gordon, and two others.

Hay made his studies at Rome rapidly. Sent to Innsbruck in 1564, he became confessor to the archduchesses of Austria, and gained such favour that he was with difficulty removed to Paris to become rector of Clermont College. He was already regarded as the probable head of the Scottish mission, and was commissioned to report to Rome on the varying fortunes of that country and its queen. In 1566, Pope Pius V resolved to send Bishop, afterwards Cardinal, Vincenzo Lauro to Mary as nuncio, and Hay was to accompany him. Hay started first (6 November) with the Piedmontese envoy Du Croc to see what could be done. Their object was to induce the queen to break with Murray, Lethington, and the other Protestant ministers.

On 14 January 1567, the interview took place. The last Catholic sovereign of Scotland was receiving the last envoys from Rome to Holyrood. Lauro had ordered Hay to ask for the execution of the ministers, and this was demanding more than Mary was at all likely to grant. She answered that "she could not stain her hands with her subjects' blood".

Before the envoys could return, the queen's refusal became relatively unimportant in consequence of the murder of Henry Darnley (10 February): a crime carried out with the connivance, if not the full consent, of the party in Mary's council from whose influence Father Hay had wished her to free herself. He was in Edinburgh at the time, and his reports are those of a friendly, well-informed witness. Like other representative Catholics, who were at that moment in touch with the circumstances of the case, he took a view adverse to Mary, and afterwards significantly described her as "peccatrix".

Back in Paris, 15 March 1567, Hay was soon appointed provincial of France, till 6 September 1574, during the difficult years that covered the conflict between the University of Paris and Father Maldonatus. He was next rector of the college of Pont-à-Mousson, till 1581. He then returned again to Paris and filled the responsible post of consultor to the Province.

In 1585, he was sent back the third time to Scotland with Father James Gordon, but was forced to return after two of three years, so harsh was the climate against Catholics. He was once more placed in high office, called to Rome, and chosen "assistant" for Germany and France, but his health was undermined by the severity of his missionary life, and he soon died.

== Notes ==
Attribution
