= Margaret Sanderson =

Margaret H. B. Sanderson is a Scottish historian and author.

== Career ==
Margaret Sanderson was born in Paisley, Renfrewshire. She gained an MA and a PhD in 1971 at the University of Edinburgh. Sanderson worked at the Scottish Record Office (now known as the National Records of Scotland) from 1969 and became head of publications and education. She has published on Scottish social history, land tenure, and material culture. In 1986, she published a biography of Cardinal David Beaton.

== Publications ==
- A Kindly Place? Living in Sixteenth-Century Scotland (East Linton: Tuckwell, 2002).
- Ayrshire and the Reformation: People and Change, 1490–1600 (East Linton, Tuckwell, 1997).
- A proper Repository’ The Building of the General Register House (HMSO, Scottish Record Office, 1992).
- Robert Adam and Scotland: Portrait of an Architect (HMSO, 1992).
- Cardinal of Scotland (Edinburgh: John Donald, 1986).
- Scottish Rural Society in the Sixteenth Century (Edinburgh: John Donald, 1982).
- Mary Stewart's People: Life in Mary Stewart's Scotland (Mercat Press: Edinburgh, 1987).
- "Manse and Glebe in the sixteenth century", Scottish Church History Society (1975), pp. 81–82.
