= Nicholas Goudanus =

Dutch Jesuit and papal diplomat

Nicholas Goudanus (also de Gouda) (c.1517–1565) was a Dutch Jesuit and papal diplomat.

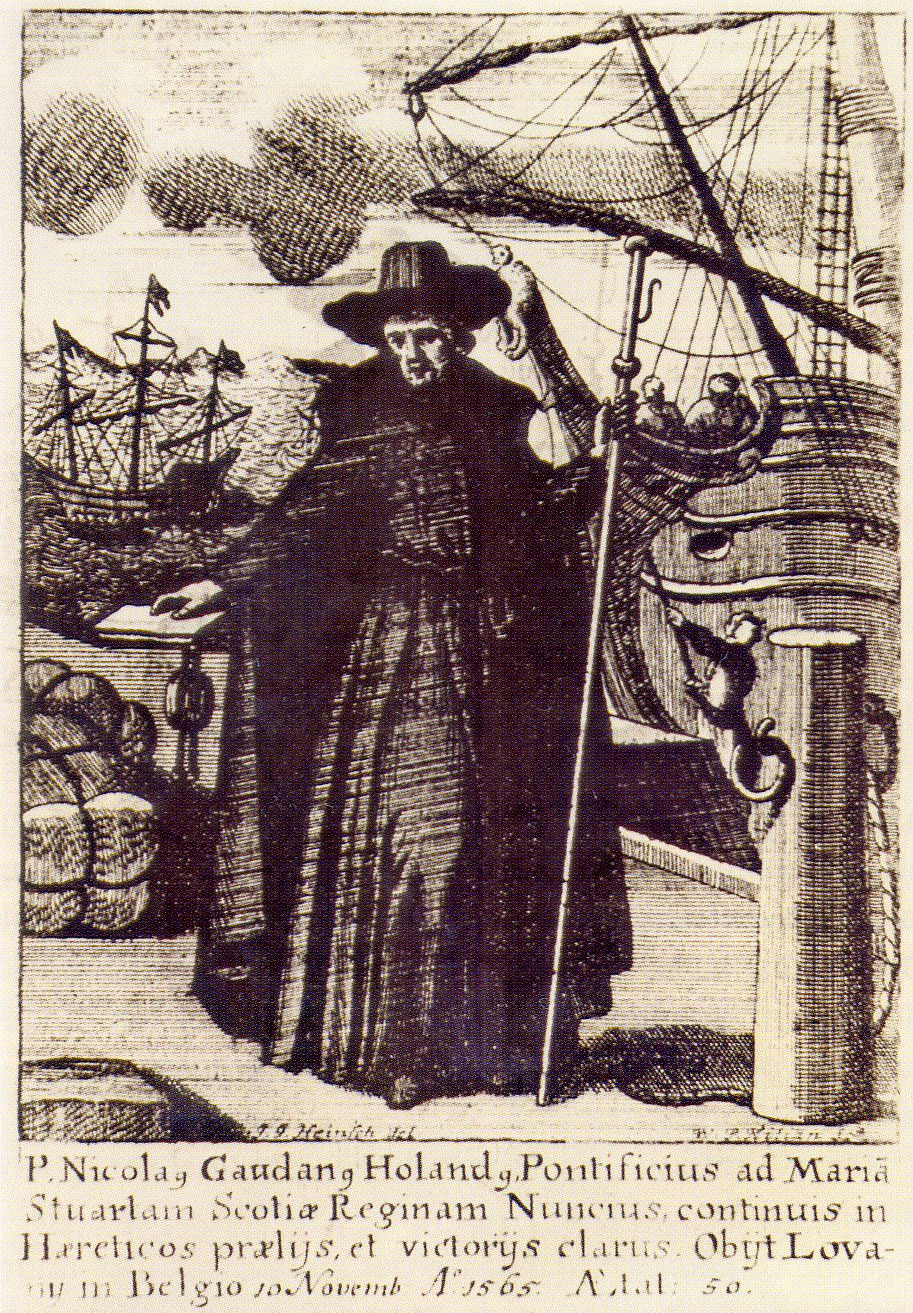
Nicholas Goudanus.

== Life ==
His surname was originally Floris (Florisz). He worked with Peter Canisius on the mission to reclaim German Protestants to Catholicism. In 1557 they had been together at the Colloquy of Worms.

Goudanus went on a covert diplomatic mission, under instructions of the end of 1561 sent by Alfonso Salmeron, via Everard Mercurian. He arrived in Scotland on 5 July 1562, or landed earlier than that in Leith, having sailed in June. He was accompanied by Edmund Hay and Jean Rivat as interpreters, and had a meeting with Mary Queen of Scots, as papal legate, at Holyrood Palace. The Queen turned down a request to send Scottish representatives to the Council of Trent, then winding up. Only one of the Scottish bishops, Robert Crichton, was prepared to give him an interview; Henry Sinclair was instructed to meet Goudanus by the Queen, but refused.

The mission lasted to September 1562. Goudanus left the country with some difficulty, with William Crichton who had been the advance party, and who was a relation of Robert Crichton. His report to Diego Laynez was discouraging. One consequence of the mission was that six Scots were recruited to the Jesuits.
