= William Crichton (Jesuit) =

Scottish Jesuit (c.1535–1617)

William Crichton or Creighton (c. 1535–1617) was a Scottish Jesuit who became head of the Scots seminary in Flanders.

== Early life and background ==
He was the son of Patrick Crighton of Camnay, Perthshire; Robert Crichton, 8th Lord Crichton of Sanquhar was a relation. He matriculated in 1552 at the University of St Andrews, and in 1561 at the University of Leuven.

== The Goudanus mission ==
Crichton entered the Society of Jesus in 1561, at the same time as Edmund Hay, a cousin. He returned to Scotland to put his affairs in order.

Nicholas de Gouda, the pope's legate, was engaged in a secret embassy to Scotland in 1561–62. Crichton and Hay conducted him around Scotland, and attended the interview he had with Robert Crichton, the bishop of Dunkeld. All the ports were watched and guarded. Crichton worked with John Hay, brother of Edmund, to see to his successful escape. Crichton accompanied him to Antwerp.

Crichton spent much of the following two decades in Aquitaine, Lyon and Avignon.

== Second mission to Scotland (1582) ==
Crichton returned to Scotland at the beginning of February 1582, having stopped in Normandy in January for a briefing from Robert Persons. He was accompanied by Ralph Emerson. Crichton was received into the house of George Seton, 7th Lord Seton, the only Catholic member of the royal council. He also corresponded with Esmé Stewart, 1st Duke of Lennox, cousin and guardian of James VI of Scotland, who was still a minor. To obtain an interview with Lennox, he had to be introduced into the king's palace at night, and to hide for three days in a secret chamber. The Duke promised that he would have the young king instructed in the Catholic religion, or else moved abroad. Crichton made some concessions on his side, drew up articles of agreement, and the Duke signed them.

In spring 1582 Crichton joined forces with William Holt, sent by Persons to England, and with this document travelled to Paris. In March he handed it over to Juan Bautista de Tassis, for Philip II of Spain. There Henry I, Duke of Guise, James Beaton, James Tyrie and others considered the Catholic cause as won. Crichton was sent to Rome and Persons to Spain, seeking a military guard for James VI and Lennox, and a Catholic bride for the king. The plan was well financed but slow moving, and became known. William Ruthven, 1st Earl of Gowrie and others acted to kidnap the young king in what became known as the Raid of Ruthven.

== Third mission (failed to land, 1584) ==
Crichton was sent to Scotland again in 1584, and with him James Gordon; but they were betrayed. Their vessel was seized at sea by the ships of William van Bloys, Admiral of Zeeland, operating for the Dutch rebels out of Vlissingen. Gordon was set at liberty, while Crichton and Patrick Addy, a secular priest, were detained. On Crichton's account, he was nearly condemned to die for the assassination (July 1584) of William the Silent. The independent Netherlands and England were moving towards an alliance, which became formal after the Treaty of Nonsuch of 1585. Queen Elizabeth, on learning that Crichton was a prisoner at Ostend, made a requested to the Dutch diplomats working towards the treaty to have him given up to her, and sent a ship to convey him to England.

Crichton was committed to the Tower of London on 16 September 1584, and remained there till May 1587, undertaking not to return to Scotland. His eventual release came after a confession made by William Parry, who was executed for treason in 1584, and who said that when he consulted Crichton as to whether it was lawful to kill the Queen he received an answer in the negative. After an examination on the subject Crichton wrote a letter to Francis Walsingham, which was published by the Queen's order. The consultation with Parry on tyrannicide had taken place in Lyon, around 1583. Crichton later clarified the point: while the Pope could sanction tyrannicide, he had told Parry that killing the Queen in the hope of retrospective permission was not allowed.

== Fourth mission (1587–1589) ==
On being released Crichton arrived in Rome in July 1587. He was ordered to return to Scotland with William Chisholm; the letter from Claudio Acquaviva sending him made it clear his "holy obedience" was required, getting round the promise he had made in England. Crichton was therefore in Scotland at the time of the Spanish Armada. Spanish soldiers and sailors were driven ashore, and Crichton had visitors at his house in Canongate; and had to evade government searches. He remained in Scotland until late in 1589, leaving with Edmund Hay.

== Madrid mission (1590–1592) ==
Crichton was in Madrid, negotiating with the Spanish court, from November 1590 to February 1592. Philip II wished to take up the offer of Scottish Catholic noblemen to seize power, and send a representative. Acquaviva decided that Crichton should on no account go, and thought in terms of Robert Bruce, who had recently been chased out, and was now in Flanders. Then Philip, who had been briefed by Crichton, decided David Graham, Laird of Fintry should be invited to come to Spain, and form the link with the Catholic earls. The timing, however, was very bad, and the Spanish king was preoccupied with France; the negotiations were put on hold. Crichton finally left Madrid for Rome about August 1592.

== After the "Spanish blanks" ==
The Spanish blanks plot was discovered late in 1592. Crichton was implicated by George Kerr, the intercepted courier, under torture. He was alleged to be the designated leader of a Spanish invasion of Scotland. Crichton had considered the situation promising: writing to Thomas Owens in 1605, he said that James had offered liberty of conscience to Catholics, and the appointment of a Scottish cardinal, in correspondence Crichton had shared with Persons. David Graham, Laird of Fintry was executed on 15 February 1593.

James Gordon carried on the Jesuit intrigue, with a mission from James VI to Rome, and returned to Scotland with the pope's legate, George Sampiretti. James later decided that the laws against Catholics should be enforced.

== Scottish College ==
Withdrawing from diplomacy, Crichton concentrated on the Scottish seminary in Flanders. Set up in 1581 at Douai, the Scots College, Douai was the leading Scottish Catholic educational establishment in the period to 1648. Crichton was its head from 1593, and moved it to Leuven in 1595.

In May 1595, Crichton was reported to have claimed that Anne of Denmark had become a Roman Catholic. Crichton still entertained hopes of converting James VI. He therefore advocated a waiting policy, and supported James's claim to be the legitimate heir to the English throne. This policy was opposed within the Jesuit ranks by William Holt, and by Robert Persons who supported the claim of Isabella Clara Eugenia, the Infanta of Spain. Crichton became involved in negotiations with John Cecil, who claimed to be working as an agent for James. In fact Cecil then represented Catholic aristocratic opposition to James in Scotland. Crichton and Cecil fell out, and Cecil raised Spanish suspicions of Crichton, who was imprisoned for a time.

== Death ==
Crichton was living in Paris in 1615, and died in 1617.

== Works ==
Crichton wrote:

- A letter to Sir Francis Walsingham concerning Parry's application to him, with this case of conscience, Whether it were lawful to kill the queen, dated 20 February 1584–5. Reprinted in Raphael Holinshed's Chronicle, and in John Morris's Troubles of our Catholic Forefathers, series ii. 81, and translated into Italian in Daniello Bartoli, Istoria della Compagnia di Gesu, lib. iv. cap. x. p. 291.
- De Missione Scotica puncta quædam notanda historiæ societatis servientia, manuscript in the archives of the Society of Jesus.
- An Apology. This work, which was published in Flanders, is referred to in A Discoverye of the Errors committed and Inivryes done to his Ma: off Scotlande and Nobilitye off the same realme, and Iohn Cecyll Pryest and D. off diuinitye, by a malitious Mythologie titled an Apologie, and compiled by William Criton Pryest and professed Iesuite, whose habits and behauioure, whose cote and conditions are as sutable, as Esav his handes, and Iacob his voice [1599].

His Reasons to show the easiness of the enterprise were printed by John Strype in his Annals.
