= David Beaton =

Scottish cardinal

His Eminence David Beaton
- Cardinal Archbishop of St Andrews; Primate of Scotland
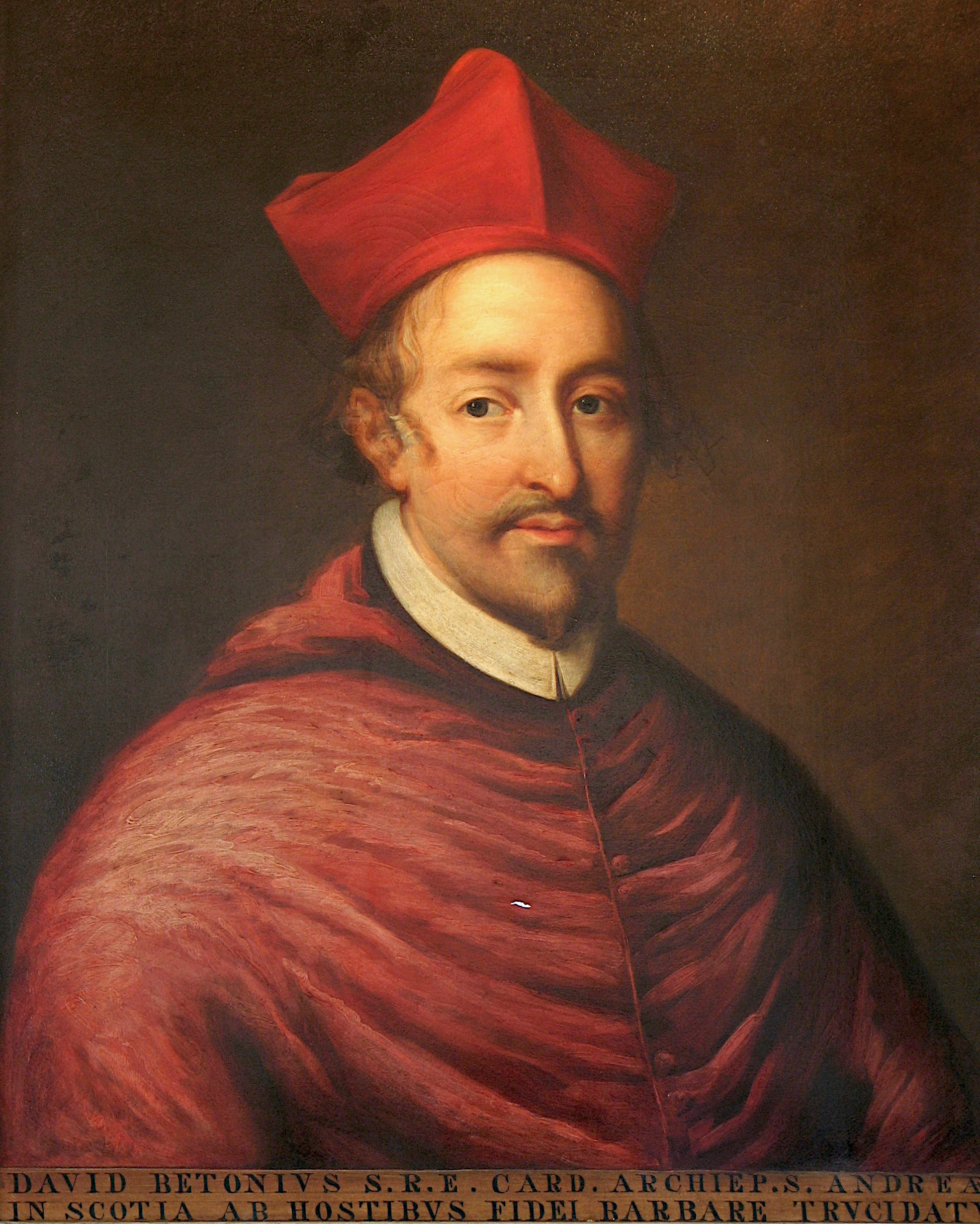
- Archdiocese: St Andrews
- In office: 1539–1546
- Predecessor: James Beaton
- Successor: John Hamilton
- Other post: Cardinal-priest of S. Stefano in Monte Celio
- Previous post: Coadjutor Archbishop of St Andrews 1537–1539

Orders
- Consecration: between 26 July and 13 August 1538
- Created cardinal: 20 December 1538 by Pope Paul III
- Rank: Cardinal-priest

Personal details
- Born: c. 1494 (probably Balfour), Fife, Scotland
- Died: 29 May 1546 (aged c. 52) St Andrews Castle, Fife, Scotland
- Denomination: Roman Catholic Church
- Parents: John Beaton and Isobel Monypenny
- Children: 8

David Beaton (also Beton or Bethune; (Note: There have been alternate spellings given for the Cardinal and his family, most commonly Bethune, Beton, or Beatoun. The cardinal spelt his own name Betovn (Betoun).) c. 1494 – 29 May 1546) was Archbishop of St Andrews and the last Scottish cardinal prior to the Reformation.

== Early life ==
His family were part of Clan Bethune, the Scottish branch of the noble French House of Bethune. David Beaton is said to have been born in 1494, the fifth son of fourteen children born to John Beaton of Balfour (d. 1514) in the county of Fife, and his wife Christian Rosyth.

His older brother John Beaton was heir to the barony of Balfour, and Balfour Castle lies south of Markinch. David Beaton ordered an engraved plate for his parents' monument at Markinch in 1541.

He was educated at the universities of St Andrews and Glasgow, and in his sixteenth year was sent to Paris and in 1519 to the university of Orléans, where he studied civil and canon law.

== Career ==
In 1520, his uncle, James Beaton, Archbishop of Glasgow, named David Beaton Rector and Prebendary at Cambuslang. After his uncle became Archbishop of St. Andrews in 1522, he resigned the position of Commendator of Arbroath in favour of his nephew. David Beaton returned to Scotland with John Stewart, Duke of Albany in 1521, and was sent to England as a diplomat in 1522. He was with Albany in 1524. In 1525, Beaton returned from France and took a seat as Lord Abbot or Commendator of Arbroath Abbey in the Scottish Parliament. In 1528 the King named him Lord Privy Seal.

Between 1533 and 1542 he acted several times as King James V's ambassador to France. He took a leading part in the negotiations connected with the King's marriages, first with Madeleine of France, and afterwards with Mary of Guise. While in France, Beaton obtained hawks and wild boar for James V. In 1537 he was made coadjutor to his uncle at St. Andrews, with right of succession.

In December 1537 Beaton was made Bishop of Mirepoix in Languedoc on the recommendation of King Francis I, and consecrated the following summer. Presumably he was ordained around that time. Francis gave him silver gilt plate made by the Parisian goldsmith Jean Hotman. Also in 1538 he was appointed a Cardinal by Pope Paul III, under the title of St Stephen in the Caelian Hill. In February 1539 Cardinal Beaton succeeded his uncle as Archbishop of St. Andrews. In 1544, he was made Papal legate in Scotland.

Relations became strained between James V and his uncle, Henry VIII of England, who sought to detach the Catholic Church in Scotland from its allegiance to the Holy See and bring it into subjection to himself. Henry sent two successive embassies to Scotland to urge James to follow his example in renouncing the authority of the Pope in his dominions. King James declined to be drawn into Henry's plans and refused to leave his kingdom for a meeting with Henry. Hostilities broke out between the two kingdoms in 1542. The Cardinal was blamed by many for the war with England that led to the defeat at Solway Moss in November 1542.

== During Mary's reign ==
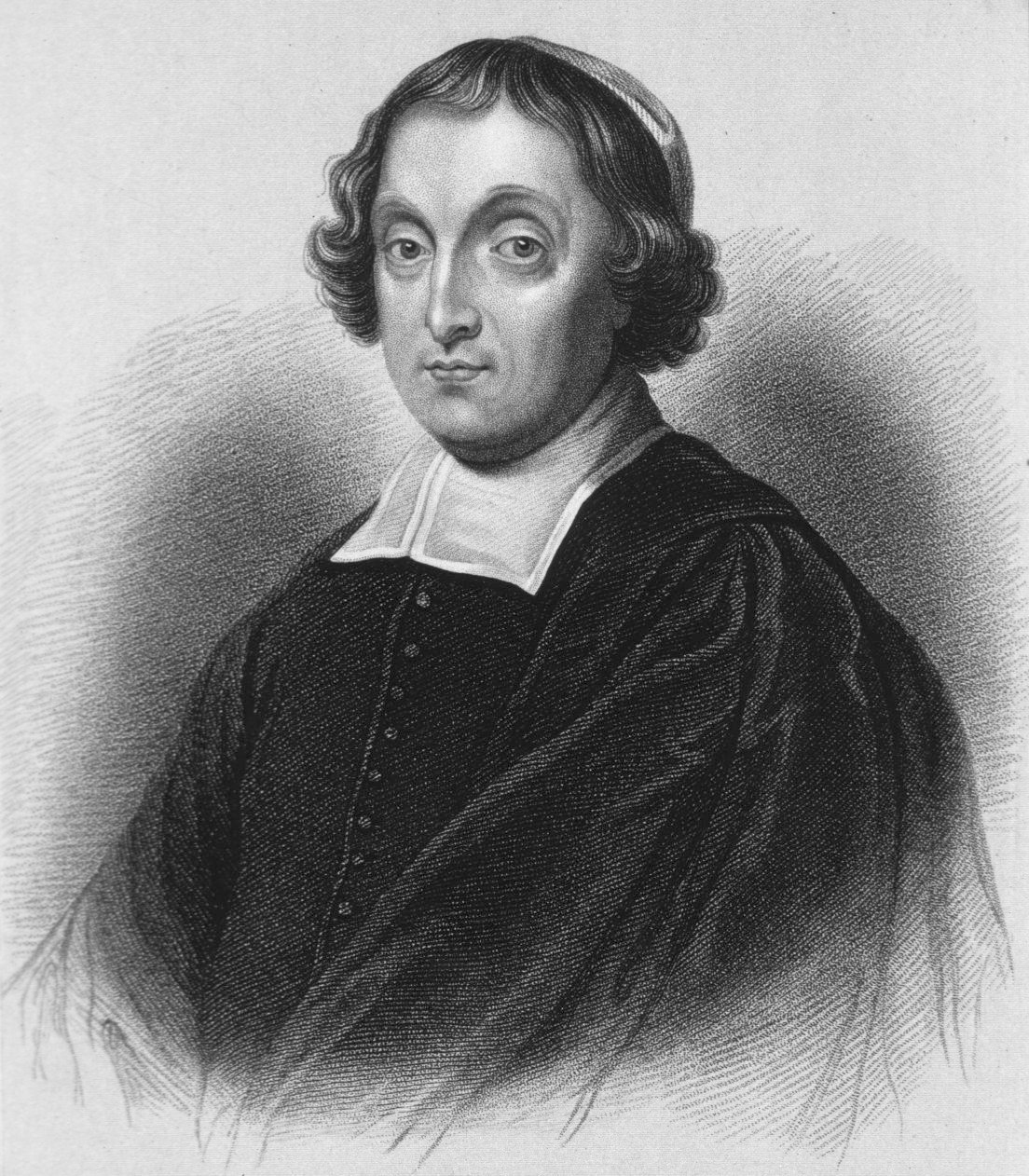
19th-century engraving of Cardinal Beaton

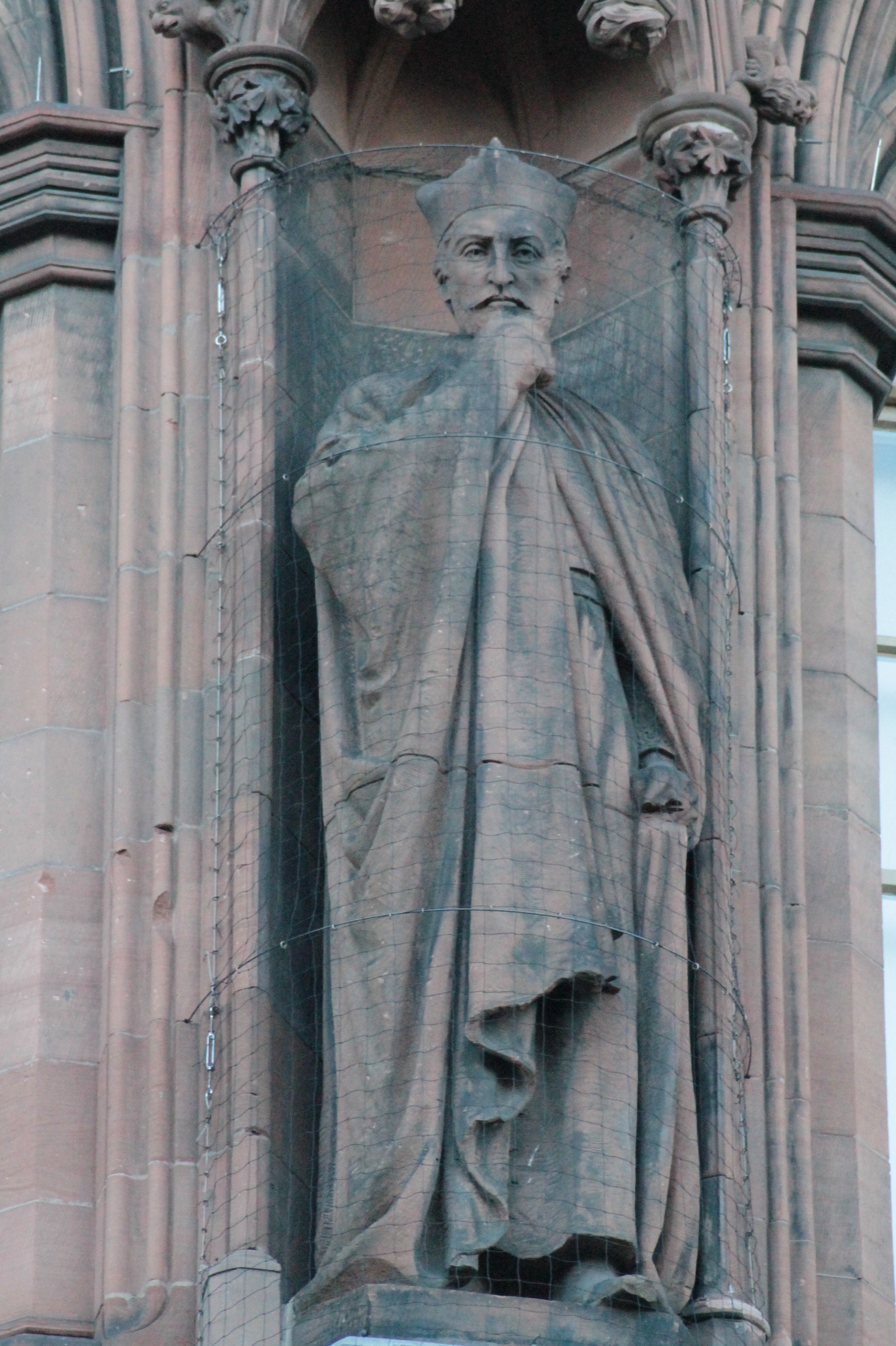
Statue of Cardinal David Beaton, Scottish National Portrait Gallery

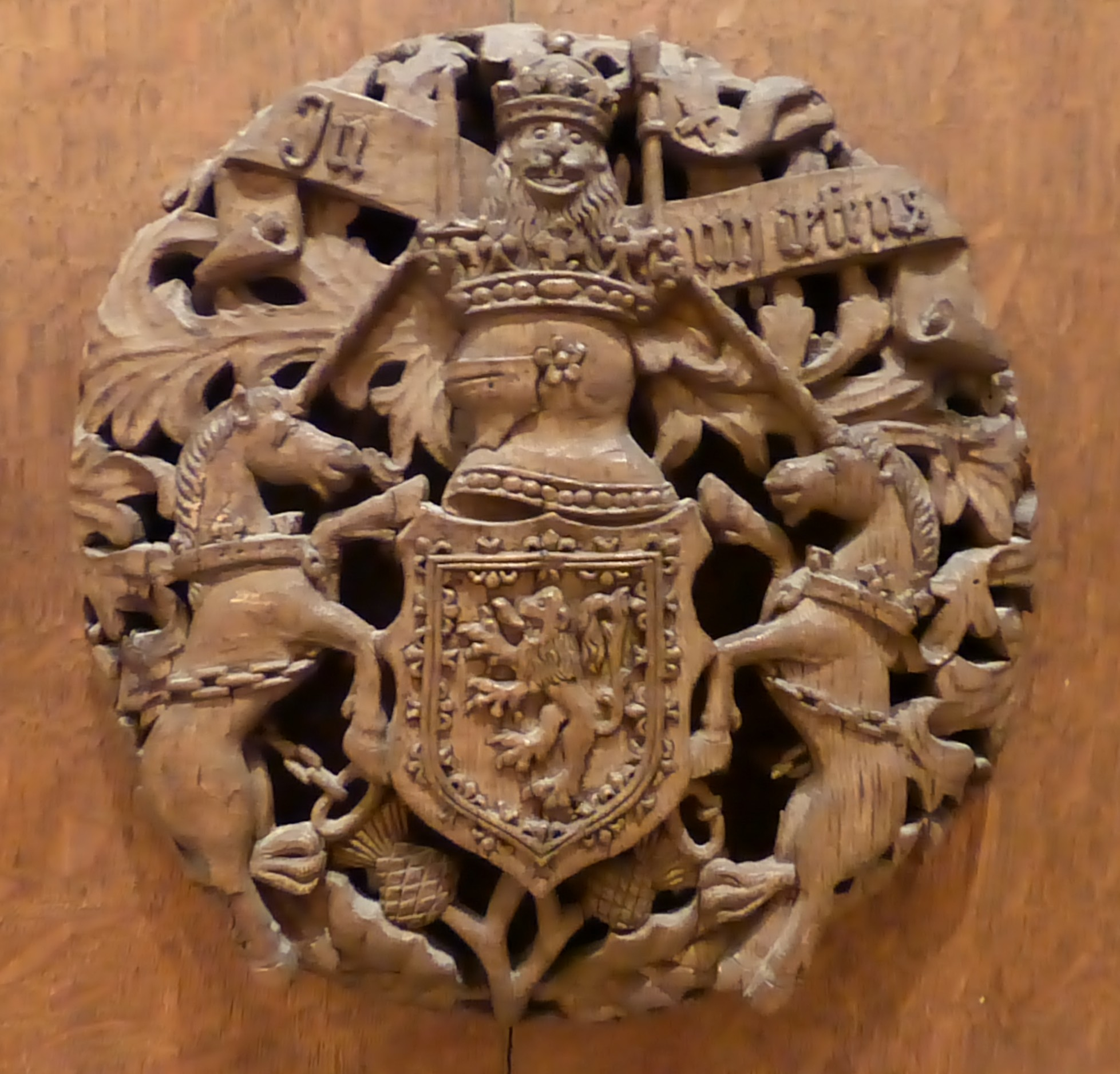
Beaton saw himself as a devoted servant of the Crown. These royal arms are from his apartments in St. Andrews Castle, Fife.

James V died at Falkland Palace on 14 December 1542. Beaton tried to become one of the regents for the infant sovereign Mary, Queen of Scots. He based his claim on an alleged will of the late King; but the will was generally regarded as forged, and The 2nd Earl of Arran, heir presumptive to the throne, was declared regent. A copy of the alleged will was preserved by Regent Arran. Dated 14 December 1542 in the King's bedchamber at Falkland Palace, it was witnessed by James Learmonth of Dairsie, Master Household; Henry Kemp of Thomastoun, Gentleman of the Chamber; Michael Durham, the King's doctor; John Tennent, William Kirkcaldy of Grange, Master Michael Dysart, Preceptor of St Anthony's at Leith; John Jordan, Rector of Yetham; Francis Aikman, perfumerer, and others at the bedside. However, the clerk who wrote the instrument, Henry Balfour, a canon of Dunkeld, was not a recognised notary.

By order of the Regent Arran, Beaton was arrested on 27 January 1543. He was imprisoned at Dalkeith Palace and then committed to the custody of Lord Seton at Seton Palace. He was transferred to Blackness Castle in March 1543 and in April was taken to his own St Andrews Castle.

A papal interdict followed the arrest of David Beaton, according to which all churches of the country should be closed and administering the sacraments should be suspended.

With Beaton out of power, the Anglophile party persuaded Regent Arran to make a marriage treaty with England on behalf of the infant Queen, and to appoint a number of Protestant preachers. The treaties signed at Greenwich in July 1543 stipulated that Mary would marry the English Prince Edward. The union of the thrones of England and Scotland which the treaty envisaged was controversial from the start. Its Anglo-centric policy was resisted by many who preferred to continue the Auld Alliance with France. Resistance to the treaty resulted in a surge in the popularity of the French faction.

In July 1543, Beaton's supporters made a "Secret Bond" against the marriage. Mary, Queen of Scots, and her mother moved from Linlithgow Palace to Stirling Castle. The French party in Scotland and Beaton gained significant power. In December 1543, Arran annulled the Treaty of Greenwich. Henry VIII began the war now known as the Rough Wooing.

Beaton was in Edinburgh on 3 May 1544 when an English fleet arrived to burn and loot in the city. John Knox wrote that Beaton dismissed the threat at first. The English troops marched from their landing point near Granton towards Leith. Arran and Beaton made a brief stand against them before leaving. Beaton made his way to Stirling.

In December 1545 Beaton arranged for the arrest, trial and execution of Protestant preacher George Wishart, who on 1 March 1546 was strangled and afterwards burned. Wishart had many sympathisers, and this led to the assassination of the Cardinal soon afterwards.

== Death ==
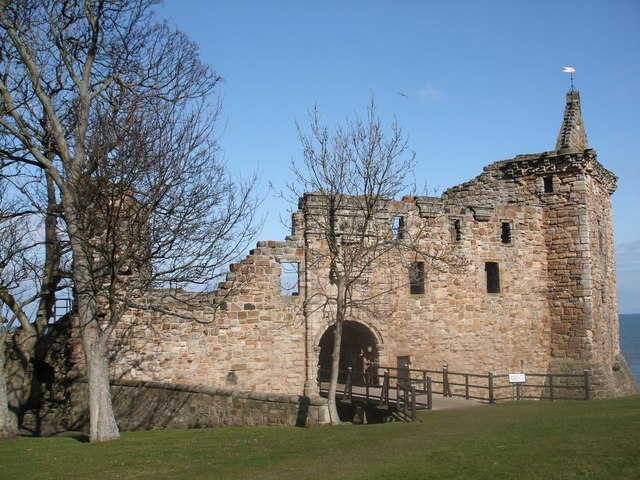
St. Andrews Castle

Plots against Cardinal Beaton had begun circulating as early as 1544. The conspirators were led by Norman Leslie, master of Rothes, and William Kirkcaldy of Grange. The Leslies had suffered from the expansion of Beaton's interest in Fife; while Kirkcaldy's uncle, James Kirkcaldy of Grange, held Protestant sympathies and had been removed in 1543 as treasurer of the realm, through Beaton's influence. They were joined by John Leslie of Parkhill, one of the Fife lairds angered at the execution of Wishart. Leslie and Kirkcaldy managed to obtain admission to St Andrews Castle at daybreak of 29 May 1546, killing the porter in the process. Leslie, Kirkcaldy, and Peter Carmichael of Balmadie used their daggers to stab the cardinal to death, mutilated the corpse, and hung it from a castle window.

At the time of his death, Beaton was Lord Chancellor of Scotland, Archbishop of St Andrews, and Cardinal Legate in Scotland.

== Marion Ogilvy ==
Cardinal Beaton's mistress, Marion Ogilvy, was born in 1500, the youngest daughter of James Ogilvy, 1st Lord Ogilvy of Airlie. After the deaths of her parents, she managed the family estates in Angus. Around 1520 she met and fell in love with David Beaton. They lived together in Ethie Castle and produced eight children. According to Margaret H.B. Sanderson, their relationship, which appeared little different from marriage, deeply offended fellow Catholics who desired the Counter-Reformation. Furthermore, the double standard, under which the Cardinal prosecuted Protestants, who advocated the marriage of the clergy, for heresy, yet lived in blatant violation of his own vow of clerical celibacy, proved highly damaging in the long run to the Catholic Church in Scotland.

Cardinal Beaton's oldest surviving son, David Beaton of Melgund, converted to Protestantism, and later became master of the household to James VI and to Anne of Denmark. His daughter Margaret married David Lindsay, 10th Earl of Crawford.

== See also ==
- Cardinal Beaton, a play based on his life.

== Sources ==
- Cameron, M.; Wright, D.; Lachman, D.; Meek, D. (1993). Dictionary of Scottish Church History and Theology. T&T Clark, Edinburgh.
- Chambers, Robert; Thomson, Thomas Napier (1857). "Beaton, or Beatoun (Cardinal) David" . A Biographical Dictionary of Eminent Scotsmen . Vol. 1. Glasgow: Blackie and Son. pp. 167–182 – via Wikisource.
- Andrew Lang. History of Scotland. Vol. I.
- MacArthur, Margaret (1885). "Beaton, David" . In Stephen, Leslie (ed.). Dictionary of National Biography. Vol. 4. London: Smith, Elder & Co.
- Sanderson, Margaret (2001). Cardinal of Scotland: David Beaton, c. 1494–1546. Edinburgh: John Donald.
- Spottiswoode, archbishop of St Andrews, John (1847–1851). History of the Church of Scotland. Spottiswoode Soc.

=== External links ===
- Extract from John Knox's account of Beaton's murder
- 1546 – Cardinal Beaton assassinated
- John Knox, History of the Reformation in Scotland, ed. David Laing (1846–1864)
- ii. (1900–1902)

Catholic Church titles
Preceded by Bernardo Clesio	Cardinal priest of S. Stefano in Monte Celio; 1538–1546	Succeeded by Giovanni Morone
Preceded by James Beaton	Archbishop of St. Andrews; 1539–1546	Succeeded by John Hamilton
Academic offices
Preceded by James Beaton, Archbishop of St Andrews	Chancellor of the University of St Andrews; 1539–1546	Succeeded by John Hamilton, Archbishop of St Andrews
Political offices
Preceded by Robert Colvill	Keeper of the Privy Seal of Scotland; 1542–1542	Succeeded by John Hamilton
Preceded by Gavin Dunbar, Archbishop of Glasgow	Lord Chancellor of Scotland; 1543–1546	Succeeded by George Gordon, 4th Earl of Huntly
