= Battle of Arbroath =

15th-century battle in Scotland

- Part of Gordon–Lindsay feud
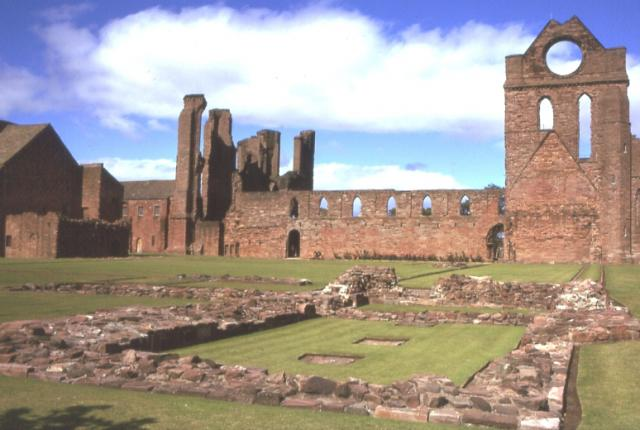
- Arbroath Abbey, where the battle took place
Date	24 January 1446 (1445 O.S.)
Location	Arbroath, Scotland
Result	Lindsay victory

Belligerents
Clan Ogilvy; Clan Gordon; Clan Oliphant; Clan Seton; Clan Forbes	Clan Lindsay

Commanders and leaders
Baron of Inverquharity	Earl of Crawford †

Casualties and losses
500.	At least 100.

The Battle of Arbroath was fought on Sunday, 24 January 1446 at Arbroath in Scotland between rival claimants to the post of Baillie of the Regality. While the Auchinleck Chronicle recorded that in "The yer of God M.CCCC.XLV, the xxiii. day of Jannar 1445 [the year of God, 1445, the 12th day of January], the Eril of Huntlie, and Ogilbeis with him, on the ta part, and the Eril of Craufurd on the tother part, met at the yettis of Arbroth on ane Sonday laite, and faucht", the new year was not designated as 1446 on the calendar in Britain until 25 March 1446. 1 January to 24 March were a continuation of 1445, which had started in Britain on 25 March 1445.

== Background ==
The conflict began after the monks of the Abbey of Arbroath appointed Alexander Lindsay, Master of Crawford, as the "Bailie of the Regality", a position charged with dispensing justice throughout the jurisdiction of the monastery.

The monks soon regretted this appointment, as Crawford began quartering large numbers of his men in the abbey, whose behaviour was considered by the monks to be vile and cruel. The monks described the Master of Crawford as "uneasy to convent", and soon dismissed him from his position. In his place they appointed Alexander Ogilvy, 2nd Baron of Inverquharity. Alexander Ogilvy not only had the right of election, but also had hereditary claims to the office. The Master of Crawford disputed the rights which Ogilvy claimed. When unable to reconcile the dispute, rather than arbitrate, they went to battle.

The Master of Crawford, who would become the 4th Earl of Crawford, was the son of David Lindsay, 3rd Earl of Crawford, and son of Marjory Ogilvy, daughter of Alexander Ogilvie of Auchterhouse.

== Battle ==
On 24 January 1445, the Master of Crawford arrived at the gates of the abbey with over one thousand men: mostly from Clan Lindsay, but also a group from Clan Hamilton of Clydesdale. Alexander Ogilvy of Inverquharity was fortunate that he was entertaining guests on the day of the attack; Alexander Gordon, 1st Earl of Huntly, Sir John Oliphant of Aberdagie, Maxwell of Tealing, Brucklay of Gartley, Forbes of Pitsligo, and Gordon of Borrowfield were all in the Baron's company. Though outnumbered, Ogilvy and his allies drew up the lines of battle. Alexander Ogilvy's force was supported by men from Clan Oliphant, Clan Seton, Clan Gordon, and Clan Forbes.

Meanwhile, the Earl of Crawford rode with great haste from Dundee in order to avert hostilities. The Earl rode across the centre of the battlefield, between the two armies, in order to confer with Ogilvy. However, one of Ogilvy's infantry mistook the Earl's approach for hostilities and threw a spear, striking the Earl in the mouth and piercing his neck, killing him instantly. Although an accident, this ended any chance for a peaceful resolution. The battle began, both lines with spears at the ready. It is said in an account of the battle by Buchanan that the Lindsays cried out "Why do you bring those goads with you, as if you had to do with oxen? Pray, throw them away, and let us fight it out without swords, hand to hand, by true valour, as becomes men." As a result, both sides abandoned their spears, with the exception of a hundred of the Clydesdale men, who held the points of their spears in their hands behind them. When they entered combat, the Clydesdale men held the spears out, creating a spear wall, which broke the ranks of the Ogilvy line.

The Ogilvy army left the Abbey, making a last desperate stand about three miles away, at the village of Leysmill, where they rallied and turned to face the pursuers. This second battle raged into the night, and Ogilvy and Pitsligo fell. The Lindsays, though victorious, suffered heavy casualties at Leysmill, and were unable to pursue the Ogilvys further when they fell back to Kinnell, the men carrying the bodies of Ogilvy and Pitsligo with them. It was determined that Ogilvy's body should be interred in the aisle of the church in Kinnell. This couplet was engraved on the aisle where he was buried: "While the girss grows green and the water rins clear, Let nane but Ogilvys lie here".

== Aftermath ==
Though the battle ended in Clan Lindsay's favour, they lost a disproportionate number of men, not to mention the Earl of Crawford. Alexander Ogilvy, Forbes of Pitsligo, Brucklay of Gartley, Gordon of Borrowfield, and Sir John Oliphant of Aberdalgie perished.

Following the battle, the Master of Crawford, who would later be known as "The Tiger Earl of Crawford", unleashed what remained of his army upon the lands of his enemies: "and the flames of their castles, the slaughter of their vassals, the plunder of their property, and the captivity of their wives and children, instructed the remotest adherents of the Bailie of Aborath, how terrible was the vengeance which they had provoked".

From this time forward, Clan Lindsay had an aversion to the colour green, and from the battle originated the couplet: "An Ogilvy in Green, Should never be seen". It appears to have become a curse to the Lindsays, who were later defeated at the Battle of Brechin against the Earl of Huntley. The Earl of Crawford attributed this loss to the Lindsays being dressed primarily in green, much like the Ogilvys at Arbroath.

The body of Alexander Ogilvy, 2nd Baron of Inverquharity, was uncovered at the church of Kinnell village in 1885, during a demolition. A local tale stated that for hundreds of years, the large boots and spurs of the Baron hung over the aisle. The remains found were of a "gigantic" man, confirming the stories of the great stature of Ogilvy. The spur, having been recovered, now sits in the vestibule of the present church at Kinnell.

== Archaeology ==
The graves of the dead from this battle have from time to time been found below the surface of the ground.
