= Alan de Wyntoun =

Arms of Seton

Sir Alan de Wyntoun (died c. 1347) was a Scottish soldier and crusader. He was the progenitor of three Scottish clans, being the ancestor of the Earls of Winton, Chiefs of Clan Seton, of the Earls of Eglinton, Chiefs of Clan Montgomery, and of the Earls of Huntly, Chiefs of Clan Gordon, respectively.

== Life ==
Wyntoun was the son of Alan de Winton and Margaret de Bothwell. Alan abducted Margaret de Seton for the purposes of forcing her to marry him. This marriage led to a sanguinary contest with rival and disappointed suitors, called ‘the Wyntoun’s war". Upon the entering into the Order of Knights of the Hospital of Saint John of Jerusalem, of his father-in-law, Alan became known as Lord of Seton, jure uxoris of his wife. He went to join the Smyrniote crusade in 1347 and died while on his way.

== Marriage and issue ==
Alan married Margaret, daughter and heiress of Alexander de Seton and Christian le Cheyne, they are known to have had the following issue, who adopted the Seton arms and name:

- William Seton, 1st Lord Seton, married Janet Fleming had issue.
- Christiana Seton, married George Dunbar, 10th Earl of March had issue.
