= 1446 =

1446 in various calendars
- Gregorian calendar: 1446; MCDXLVI
- Ab urbe condita: 2199
- Armenian calendar: 895; ԹՎ ՊՂԵ
- Assyrian calendar: 6196
- Balinese saka calendar: 1367–1368
- Bengali calendar: 852–853
- Berber calendar: 2396
- English Regnal year: 24 Hen. 6 – 25 Hen. 6
- Buddhist calendar: 1990
- Burmese calendar: 808
- Byzantine calendar: 6954–6955
- Chinese calendar: 乙丑年 (Wood Ox); 4143 or 3936 — to — 丙寅年 (Fire Tiger); 4144 or 3937
- Coptic calendar: 1162–1163
- Discordian calendar: 2612
- Ethiopian calendar: 1438–1439
- Hebrew calendar: 5206–5207
- Hindu calendars
- Vikram Samvat: 1502–1503
- Shaka Samvat: 1367–1368
- Kali Yuga: 4546–4547
- Holocene calendar: 11446
- Igbo calendar: 446–447
- Iranian calendar: 824–825
- Islamic calendar: 849–850
- Japanese calendar: Bun'an 3 (文安３年)
- Javanese calendar: 1361–1362
- Julian calendar: 1446; MCDXLVI
- Korean calendar: 3779
- Minguo calendar: 466 before ROC 民前466年
- Nanakshahi calendar: −22
- Thai solar calendar: 1988–1989
- Tibetan calendar: ཤིང་མོ་གླང་ལོ་ (female Wood-Ox); 1572 or 1191 or 419 — to — མེ་ཕོ་སྟག་ལོ་ (male Fire-Tiger); 1573 or 1192 or 420

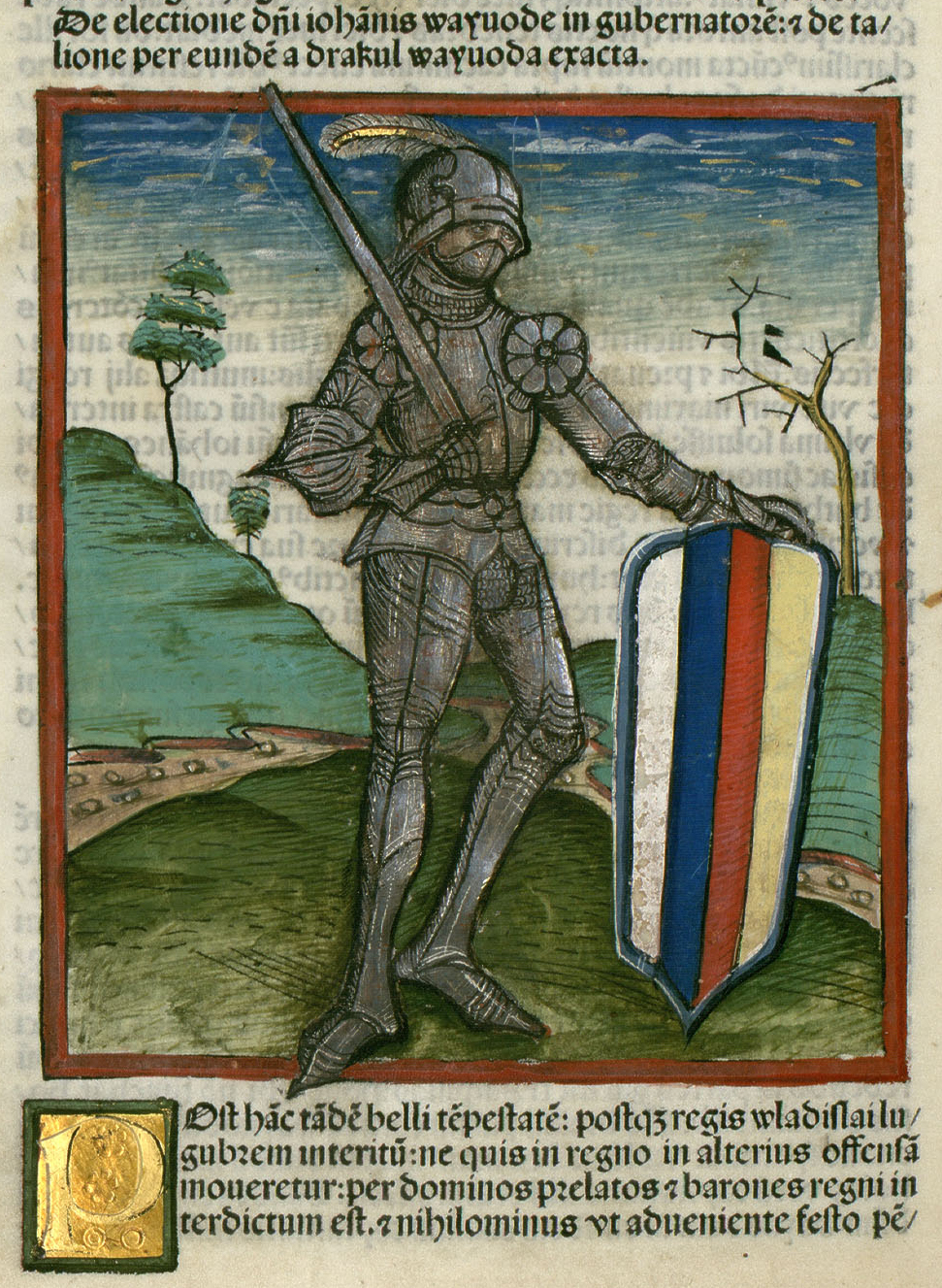
June 6: John Hunyadi is proclaimed as Regent of Hungary

Year 1446 (MCDXLVI) was a common year starting on Saturday of the Julian calendar.

== Events ==
=== January–March ===
- January 2 – (5th waxing of Tabodwe 807 ME) At the city of Taungoo in what is now Myanmar, 14-year-old Minkhaung I becomes the new Viceroy of Toungoo, a semi-independent vassal state of the Kingdom of Ava, ruled by King Narapati I of Ava. Minkhaung's ascension comes hours after the sudden death of his father, the Viceroy Tarabya.
- January 15 – On his 14th birthday, Afonso V is acclaimed as King of Portugal, with full power to govern the kingdom, although his uncle, Pedro, Duke of Coimbra continues to operate as regent. Afonso had succeeded to the throne in 1438 upon the death of his father, King Duarte I.
- January 24 – The Battle of Arbroath takes place in Scotland as the monks of the Abbey of Arbroath dismiss Alexander Lindsay, son of the Earl of Crawford, from the position of Bailie of the Regality, and replace him with Alexander Ogilvy, Baron of Inverquharity. Lindsay attacks the abbey with fellow members of his own Clan Lindsay and the assistance of Clan Hamilton, while Ogilvy is supported by Clan Oliphant, Clan Seton, Clan Gordon and Clan Forbes. The Earl of Crawford, seeking to avert the battle, rides his horse to the battlefield in hopes of conferring with Ogilvy, but is killed by a member of Ogilvy's infantry. In the battle that follows, Clan Lindsay prevails and Ogilvy is killed.
- February 12 – Vasily II, the Grand Prince of Moscow and ruler of much of Russia, is kidnapped from Trinity Monastery the Kremlin by allies of his cousin, Dmitry Shemyaka. Four days later (February 16), the conspirators tear out the eyes of Grand Prince Vasily and send him into exile at Uglich with his wife.
- March 6 – The Battle of Ragaz marks the last military conflict of the Old Zurich War between the Swiss Confederacy and the Habsburgs, as 1,200 soldiers of the Confederation defeat the Austrian army, commanded by Hans von Rechberg and Wolfhart V. von Brandis, the Habsburg bailiff of Feldkirch. Among other things, the banners of the lords of Brandis are lost to the confederates and later transferred to the church in Sarnen. According to contemporary accounts, around 900 men from the Habsburg army and around 100 men from the Swiss army fell in the battle.
- March 21 – In the Holy Roman Empire in Germany, the Electors of Cologne, Trier, Mainz, and the Palatinate, along with representatives of the Electors of Saxony and Brandenburg, assemble at Frankfurt-am-Main and create a mutual defense alliance to resist Pope Eugene IV.

=== April–June ===
- April 7 – In England, Thomas de Ashton and Edmund de Trafford, both knights of Lancashire, are granted special dispensation by King Henry VI to use their research in alchemy to transmute substances into precious metals.
- April 28 – Queen Soheon of Joseon, Queen consort of King Sejong of Korea, dies 27 years after her husband first ascended the throne. King Sejong spends the remaining four years of his life in mourning and becomes a vegetarian.
- May 2 – (5 Safar 849 AH) Sultan Muhammad of the Timurid Empire in Iran arrives in Isfahan and forces out a disloyal governor, Sa'adat, then declares an amnesty on taxes, stages a feast and celebration, and appoints Shah Ala' al-Din Naqib as the new governor.
- May 24 – In what is now the state of Karnataka in India, Prince Mallikarjuna Raya becomes the new Emperor of Vijayanagara upon the death of his father, Deva Raya II, and takes the name of Emperor Deva Raya III.
- June 6 – John Hunyadi is proclaimed regent of Hungary during the minority of King Ladislaus the Posthumous, with the title Regni Gubernator. His election is primarily promoted by the lesser nobility, but Hunyadi has by this time become one of the richest barons of the kingdom. His domains cover an area exceeding 800,000 hectares (2,000,000 acres). Hunyadi is one of the few contemporaneous barons who has spent a significant part of their revenues to finance the wars against the Ottomans, thus bearing a large share of the cost of fighting for many years.
- June 8 – After a siege of seven months, Baghdad is captured by the Sultan Jahan Shah of Qara Qoyunlu, whose forces move into what is now Iraq.
- June 12 – An armistice between Duchy of Austria and the Swiss Confederation comes into force, ending the Old Zurich War.
- June 21 – Lidköping gets its charter, and thus qualifies as one of the now defunct Cities of Sweden.
- June 26 – Gilles de Bretagne, the brother of Francois I, Duke of Brittany, is arrested after allowing agents of King Charles VII of France to enter his home, Château du Guildo. He is eventually murdered while in custody at La Harduinaie.

=== July–September ===
- July 28 – The compilation of the Alfonsine Ordinances, the first codification of the laws of the Kingdom of Portugal, is completed by Rui Fernandes of Almada and given to Dom Pedro de Coimbra, the regent for King Afonso V.
- August 24 – After many years of fruitless negotiations between Christopher of Bavaria and Erik of Pomerania, a Swedish war march to Gotland is launched in the early summer of 1446. King Christopher comes with a force to the island and on an open field in Västergarn with crossbowmen at gunpoint behind each monarch's back; regular peace negotiations take place.
- August – Christopher of Bavaria undertakes a fruitless military campaign against Gotland to end Erik of Pomerania's piracy.
- September 27 – Battle of Otonetë: Skanderbeg defeats the Ottomans.

=== October–December ===
- October 5 – The compromise proposed by Holy Roman Emperor Frederick III with Pope Eugene IV is publicly endorsed by the Elector of Mainz, the Elector of Brandenburg, the Margrave of Ansbach, the Margrave Jakob I of Baden, the Grand Master of the Teutonic Order, the Archbishop of Salzburg, the and the Bishops of Augsburg, Chiemsee, Bamberg, Passau, Constanz and Chur.
- October 9 – The hangul alphabet is proclaimed in Korea, by King Sejong the Great. The Hunmin Jeongeum, published during the year, is considered the start of this brand new scientific writing system.
- October 10 – An earthquake occurs in Moscow but causes little damage
- October 11 – In what is now the Indian state of Madhya Pradesh, Mahmud Khalji, Sultan of Malwa attempts to cross the Banas River to invade Mandalgarh in what is now the state of Rajasthan, but he and his armies are driven back by the forces of the Rana Kumbhakaran Singh, ruler of the Kingdom of Mewar.
- October – Murad II, who recently became the Sultan of the Ottoman Empire after his son Mehmed II was forced by the Janissaries to abdicate, invades Attica, forcing Constantine XI to return Thebes to the duchy of Athens, and remove the tribute imposed in 1444. Murad II imposes his own tribute.
- November 13 – In Italy, Sante Bentivoglio, who had recently been "working in the wool industry in Florence under another name" becomes the ruler of Bologna at age 20 when he is named as guardian of the young child of the recently-assassinated Annibale I Bentivoglio
- December 10 – After hesitating for several weeks, Sultan Murad II, of the Ottoman Empire, destroys the Hexamilion wall, in an assault that includes cannons. Murad and the Ottoman governor of Thessaly, Turakhan Beg, ravage the Peloponnese Peninsula at will, with the Sultan devastating the northern shore, while Glarentza and Turakhan raid in the interior. The Despotate of the Morea is turned into an Ottoman vassal state.
- December 14 – King Henry VI summons the English Parliament to assemble at Cambridge on February 10.
- December 23 – On their way back to England after a pilgrimage to the Holy Land, the 37 pilgrims on the ship Cog Anne are killed when the vessel strikes a rock near the port of Modon in Greece.
- December 24 – Edmund Beaufort, Marquess of Dorset, is appointed as last Governor of English-occupied France.

=== Date unknown ===
- Nuno Tristão is killed by natives on the coast of Senegal.
- Portuguese navigator Álvaro Fernandes reaches the mouth of the Casamance River in Senegal.
- The Precious Belt Bridge in China is fully reconstructed.
- In Italy, the siege of Cremona, by the condottieri troops of Francesco Piccinino and Luigi dal Verme, is raised after the arrival of Scaramuccia da Forlì.
- The Blarney Stone is set into a tower of Blarney Castle in Blarney, County Cork in Ireland.
- Another league is formed to counter the House of Sforza.

== Births ==
- April 18 – Ippolita Maria Sforza, Italian noble (d. 1484)
- May 3
  - Frederick I of Liegnitz, Duke of Chojnów and Strzelin from 1453 (d. 1488)
  - Margaret of York, duchess consort of Burgundy by marriage to Charles the Bold (d. 1503)
- August 14 – Andrey Bolshoy, Russian royal (d. 1493)
- December 26 – Charles of Valois, Duke of Berry, French noble (d. 1472)
- date unknown – Edmund de Ros, 10th Baron de Ros, English politician (d. 1508)
- probable
  - Alexander Agricola, Flemish composer (d. 1506)
  - William Grocyn, English scholar (d. 1519)
  - Pietro Perugino, Italian painter (d. 1524)

== Deaths ==
- April 15 – Filippo Brunelleschi, Italian architect (b. 1377)
- May 9 – Mary of Enghien, Queen of Naples (b. 1367)
- May 24 – Ambroise de Loré, Baron of Ivry (b. 1396)
- June 11 – Henry Beauchamp, 1st Duke of Warwick, English nobleman (b. 1425)
- December 28 – Antipope Clement VIII
- February 2 – Vittorino da Feltre, Italian humanist (b. 1378)
- date unknown – Nuno Tristão, Portuguese explorer
