= David Lindsay, 3rd Earl of Crawford =

Scottish nobleman

David Lindsay, 3rd Earl of Crawford (died 24 January 1446) was a regent to James II of Scotland. He was a member of Clan Lindsay, a Scottish Lowland clan. He was the son of Alexander Lindsay, 2nd Earl of Crawford by his wife Marjorie or Marjory of Dunbar.

At the Battle of Arbroath in 1446 the Clan Lindsay, led by the Master of Crawford, advanced with over 1000 men. Their enemy was the Clan Ogilvy who were also supported by men from the Clan Oliphant, Clan Gordon, Clan Seton and Clan Forbes of Pitsligo. The Earl, who was the Master of Crawford's father, rode between the two armies in an attempt to call a truce. However, an ill-advised Ogilvie, thinking that this was the start of the Lindsay's attack, threw his spear at the Earl, hitting him in the mouth and killing him instantly. So the battle began which went in the Clan Lindsay's favour.

== Marriage and issue ==
Crawford married Marjory Ogilvie, daughter of Alexander Ogilvie of Auchterhouse. By her he had issue:

- Alexander Lindsay, 4th Earl of Crawford, called "Tiger Earl" or "Earl Beardie." He married Elizabeth Dunbar, of the house of March (Earl of March), and his son, David Lindsay, 5th Earl of Crawford (d.1495), was created Duke of Montrose on 18 May 1488.
- Walter Lindsay of Beaufort and Edzell, styled of Kinblethmont, had charters of the baronies of Arde and Bewfort in 1459, and of the barony of Panbride in 1463. He married first Sophia, daughter of Livingston of Saltcoats, but by her had no issue. He married again to Isabel, daughter of Livingston of Saltcoats, and had 10 children
- William Lindsay of Lekoquhy
- Sir John Lindsay (k. 1452- Battle of Brechin)
- James, who founded a house in Augsburg, Germany.
- Janet Lindsay, married William Douglas, 6th Earl of Douglas
- Elizabeth Lindsay

Peerage of Scotland
Preceded by Alexander Lindsay	Earl of Crawford; 1438–1445	Succeeded by Alexander Lindsay
