= Alexander Seton, Lord Gordon =

Alexander Seton, Lord Gordon (as of 1436)
- Died: 1440 or 1441
- Noble family: Clan Seton
- Spouse: Elizabeth Gordon, Heiress of Gordon
- Father: Sir William Seton of Seton
- Mother: Janet Fleming

Alexander Seton, Lord Gordon (d. 1440 or 1441) was a Scottish baron, Lord of Parliament and progenitor of the Gordon Earls and Marquesses of Huntly.

== Life ==
Alexander Seton was the second son of Sir William Seton of Seton and his wife, Janet Fleming. (Note: A manuscript in the British Museum styles Sir William Seaton as "Wilhelmus primus dominus Seton" and other documents confirm this title. The date of this creation of the premier baronage of Scotland, is dated to sometime before 1393. A singular mistake in this record has Sir William Seaton marrying Catherine, daughter of Sir William St. Clair of Herdmanston. The Complete Peerage [vol. vi, p. 1, footnote (a)] corrects this to Janet Fleming, daughter of Sir David Fleming of Gibbar & Cumbernauld. They had two sons, John, who succeeded his father—it was he who married Catherine Sinclair (St. Clair)—and Alexander who married Elizabeth Gordon, heiress of Gordon. The Gordons were originally from Normandy, the founder of the family coming to Scotland in the twelfth century, probably in the train of David I of Scotland, and received a grant of the lands of Gordon in Berkshire. See: Robert Seton, An Old Family: or, The Setons of Scotland and America (New York: Brentano's, 1899), pp. 49-50; Scots Peerage, VIII, 574 & n. 1.) When King Robert III of Scotland sent his only remaining son, the future king James I of Scotland to France for safety, the ship was taken by English pirates and Prince James, along with his companions, was taken prisoner and turned over to Henry IV of England. Alexander Seton was one of those taken prisoner along with the future king. On 7 March 1408 Alexander's father, Sir William Seton, purchased the wardship of Elizabeth Gordon, Heiress of Gordon from Walter de Haliburton of Dirleton for a liferent of 50 merks from the barony of Tranent. Sir William originally betrothed her to his eldest son Sir John Seton but when John declined, Elizabeth was then betrothed to William's younger son, Alexander Seton, who by this time had been released by the English.

Elizabeth and Alexander wed in 1408. He acquired through his marriage to Elizabeth Gordon the lands of Gordon and Huntly, confirmed to them on 20 July 1408. Elizabeth Gordon was forced to resign her lands before Parliament at Perth and the Regent of Albany issued a new charter of "All and whole of the lands and baronies of Gordon and Huntly lying within the sheriffdom of Berwick; the lands of Fogo and Faunes with their pertinents; the lands of Strathbogie and Beldygordon with the pertinents in Aberdeenshire; to be held by the said Alexander and Elizabeth and their heirs lawfully procreated; whom failing the true and lawful heirs of the said Elizabeth whomsoever; rendering the services used and wont."

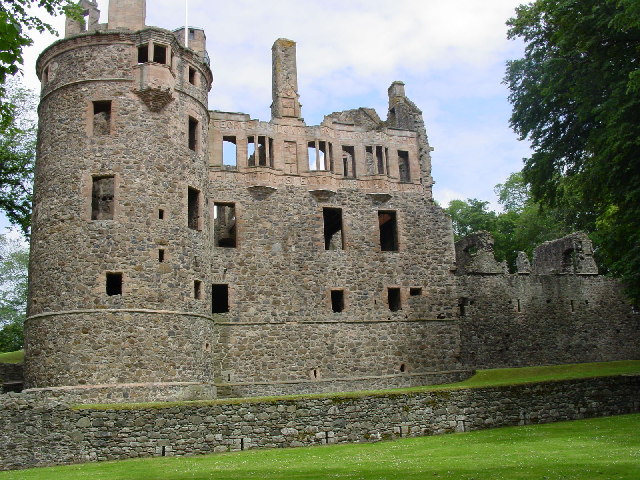
Huntly Castle, originally called Strathbogie, erected by Sir Adam de Gordon, Lord of Gordon, Elizabeth's father.

Three years later Alexander fought at the Battle of Harlaw and was knighted before 1419. In 1421–2 he traveled to France and visited King James of Scotland. Alexander Seton was one of those who negotiated for the release of the Scottish monarch and was a hostage for his king, but was released after a year in England to return to his family in Scotland. In that same year Alexander and Elizabeth were granted a charter for half the lands of Culclarochy and part of Gerry in the barony of Drumblade. About 1436 Alexander was created a Lord of Parliament as Alexander Seton, Lord Gordon.

In 1428 Alexander and Elizabeth were granted a dispensation from the pope long after their marriage when it was determined they were within the forbidden degrees of consanguinity; the dispensation stating that Alexander Seton had contracted marriage with Elizabeth, the heiress of Gordon, "per verba de presenti publici, juxta morem patriae" (Latin: publicly in accordance with all customs of the time). Elizabeth predeceased her husband dying at Strathbogie on 16 March 1439 while Alexander died in 1440–41.

== Family ==
Alexander Seton married (1408) Elizabeth Gordon, daughter of Adam de Gordon, Lord of Gordon and Elizabeth Keith, daughter of William Keith, Marischal of Scotland. Their children were:

- Alexander Seton (d. 1470), succeeded his parents, took the name of Gordon and was created 1st Earl of Huntly
- William Seton (d. 1452), married Elizabeth, daughter and heiress of William Meldrum of Memdrum. Was the ancestor of the Setons of Meldrum
- Henry Seton (d. 1452) killed with his brother William at the Battle of Brechin
- Elizabeth Seton, married to Alexander of Islay, Earl of Ross (d. 1449)
