= Elizabeth Gordon, Heiress of Gordon =

Scottish baroness (died 1439)

Elizabeth Gordon, Baroness Gordon
- Died: 16 March 1439; Huntly Castle, Strathbogie, Aberdeenshire
- Noble family: Clan Gordon
- Spouses: Alexander Seton, Lord Gordon, j.u.
- Father: Adam de Gordon, Lord Gordon
- Mother: Elizabeth Keith

Elizabeth Gordon, Heiress of Gordon († 1439), Scottish baroness and progenitress of the Gordon Earls and Marquesses of Huntly.

== Life ==
Elizabeth Gordon was the daughter of Elizabeth Keith, daughter of William Keith, Marischal of Scotland. and Adam de Gordon, Lord of Gordon (Note: The Gordons were originally from Normandy, the founder of the family coming to Scotland in the twelfth century, probably in the train of David I of Scotland, and received a grant of the lands of Gordon in Berkshire. See: Robert Seton, An old family: or, The Setons of Scotland and America (New York: Brentano's, 1899), pp. 49-50.)

Elizabeth, underage at the time of her father's death in 1402, was a ward of Walter Haliburton of Dirleton. Sir William Seton purchased her wardship on 7 March 1408 for a liferent of 50 merks from the barony of Tranent. Sir William betrothed her to his eldest son Sir John Seton but he declined preferring a daughter of the Earl of March; Elizabeth was then married to his younger brother, Alexander Seton, who in 1406 was a prisoner along with the future king James I of Scotland.

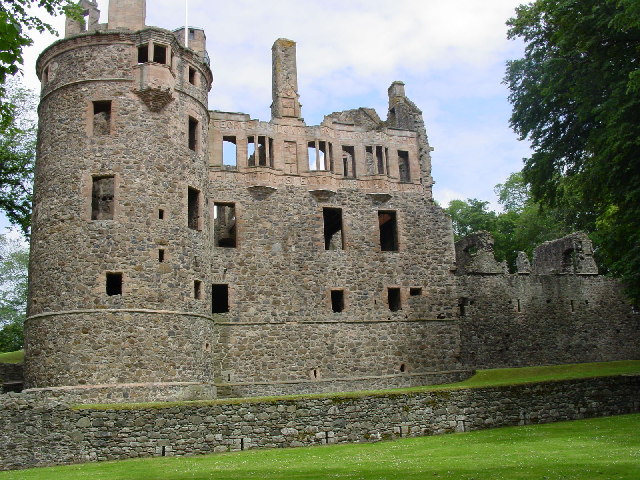
Huntly Castle, originally called Strathbogie, erected by Sir Adam de Gordon, Lord of Gordon, Elizabeth's father.

Elizabeth and Alexander wed in 1408. He acquired through his marriage to Elizabeth Gordon the lands of Gordon and Huntly, confirmed to them on 20 July 1408. This was according to custom of the time that Elizabeth Gordon, of her own free will, resigned her lands before Parliament at Perth and she and the Regent Albany issued a new charter of "All and whole of the lands and baronies of Gordon and Huntly lying within the sheriffdom of Berwick; the lands of Fogo and Faunes with their pertinents; the lands of Strathbogie and Beldygordon with the pertinents in Aberdeenshire; to be held by the said Alexander and Elizabeth and their heirs lawfully procreated; whom failing the true and lawful heirs of the said Elizabeth whomsoever; rendering the services used and wont."

Three years later, Alexander fought at the Battle of Harlaw and was knighted before 1419. In 1421–2 he traveled to France and visited King James of Scotland. Alexander Seton was one of those who negotiated for the release of the Scottish monarch and was a hostage for his king, but was released after a year in England to return to his family in Scotland. In that same year Elizabeth and Alexander were granted a charter for half the lands of Culclarochy and part of Gerry in the barony of Drumblade. About 1436 Elizabeth's husband, Alexander was created a Lord of Parliament as Alexander Seton, Lord Gordon.

In 1428, Elizabeth and Alexander were granted a dispensation from the pope long after their marriage when it was determined they were within the forbidden degrees of consanguinity; the dispensation stating that Elizabeth, the heiress of Gordon had contracted marriage with Alexander Seton, "per verba de presenti publici, juxta morem patriae" (Latin: publicly in accordance with all customs of the time). Elizabeth died at Strathbogie on 16 March 1439 while Alexander died in 1440–41. Elizabeth was buried at St. Nicholas Church in Aberdeen.

== Family ==
The children of Alexander Seton and Elizabeth Gordon were:

- Alexander Seton († 1470), succeeded his parents, took the name of Gordon and was created 1st Earl of Huntly
- William Seton († 1452), married Elizabeth, daughter and heiress of William Meldrum of Meldrum, ancestor of the Setons of Meldrum
- Henry Seton († 1452) killed with his brother William at the Battle of Brechin
- Elizabeth Seton, married to Alexander of Islay, Earl of Ross († 1449)
