= William Seton, 1st Lord Seton =

Arms of William Seton, 1st Lord Seton; Or, three crescents within a double tressure flory counter-flory gules.

William Seton (Born abt. 1348-died 1410), born William de Wyntoun, was a 14th–15th-century noble.

== Life ==
William was the eldest son of Alan de Wyntoun and Margaret Seton, heiress of Seton. William adopted the name and arms of Seton, succeeding to the estates of his mother and was created the Lord Seton in 1371. Seton purchased the wardship of Elizabeth Gordon, Heiress of Gordon from Walter de Haliburton of Dirleton on 7 March 1408 for a liferent of 50 merks from the barony of Tranent. Originally Elizabeth had been betrothed to his eldest son John, however he declined, Elizabeth was then betrothed to William's younger son, Alexander who by this time had been released by the English, after being captured with Prince James of Scotland while traveling aboard Maryenknyght, while en route to France.

== Family and issue ==
He married Janet, the daughter of David Fleming of Biggar & Cumbernauld, they are known to have had the following issue:

- John Seton, 2nd Lord Seton, married Katherine, daughter of William St Clair of Hermandston, had issue.
- Alexander Seton, married Elizabeth Gordon, heiress of Adam de Gordon, Lord of Gordon, had issue.
- Margaret
- Marion
- Jean
- Catherine

== Citations ==
Peerage of Scotland
New creation	Lord Seton; 1371–1410	Succeeded by John Seton
