= Clan Gordon =

Scottish clan

- Gòrdanach (Singular), Na Gòrdanaich (Collective)
- Crest: In a ducal coronet Or, a stag's head and neck affrontée proper, attired with ten tines Gold
- Motto: Bydand ("abiding"); Animo non astutia ("By courage, not by craft")
- Slogan: An Gòrdonach

Profile
- Region: Highland
- District: Aberdeenshire
- Plant badge: Rock ivy
- Pipe music: "The Gordon's March", "Cock o' the North"

Chief
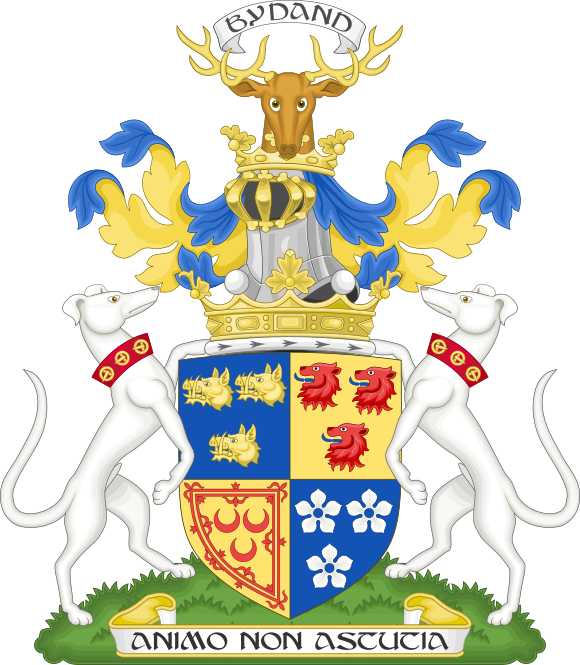
- The Most Hon. Granville Charles Gordon
- The 13th Marquess of Huntly (An Gòrdonach)
- Seat: Aboyne Castle
- Historic seat: Huntly Castle
Septs of Clan Gordon
Ackane, Adam(son), Ad(d)i.e., Addison, Adkins, Aiken, Aitchison, Aitken, Akane, Akins, Atkin, Atkins(on), Badenoch, Barrie, Connor, Connon, Craig, Cromb(i.e.), Cullen, Culane, Darg(e), Dorward, Durward, Eadie, Ed(d)i.e., Edison, Esslemont, Fettes, Garden, Gard(i)ner, Garioch, Garr(o)ick, Geddes, Gerr(y)ie, Haddo(w), Huntl(e)y, Jessiman, Jopp, Jupp, Laurie, Lawrie, MacAdam, Mallett, Manteach, Marr, Maver, Mill, Mills, Milles, Miln(e), Milner, Meldrum, Moir, More, Morrice, Muir, Milnes, Mylne, Steel(e), Teal, Tod(d), Troup
Clan branches
Gordon of Huntly (chiefs)
Gordon of Aboyne
Gordon of Aberdeen and Temair
Gordon of Kenmure
Gordon of Auchindoun
Gordon of Abergeldie
Gordon of Haddo
Gordon of Glenbuchat
Gordon of Gight
Gordon of Rothiemay
See also:
Gordon baronets
Duke of Gordon
Allied clans
Clan Seton
Clan Sutherland
Clan Burnett
Clan MacDonald of Keppoch
Clan Ogilvy
Clan Grant
Clan Baillie
Rival clans
Clan Lindsay
Clan Douglas
Clan Forbes
Clan Leask
Clan Campbell
Clan Maitland

Clan Gordon is a Highland Scottish clan, historically one of the most powerful Scottish clans. The Gordon lands once spanned a large territory across the Highlands. Presently, Gordon is seated at Aboyne Castle, Aberdeenshire. The Chief of the clan is the Earl of Huntly, later the Marquess of Huntly.

During the Wars of Scottish Independence in the 13th century, the Gordons supported William Wallace in the cause of independence. In the 15th century, the chiefship of the clan passed to an heiress, who married into the Seton family and her male descendants assumed the surname Gordon and continued as chiefs of the clan. The Gordons assisted in defeating the rebellion of the Earl of Douglas also in the 15th century. In the 16th century, the Gordons as Catholics feuded with their Protestant neighbors the Clan Forbes and also defeated at the Battle of Glenlivet, the Protestant Earl of Argyll. During the Wars of the Three Kingdoms of the 17th century, the Gordons supported the Royalist cause. During the Jacobite rising of 1715 the Clan Gordon was Jacobite. During the Jacobite rising of 1745, their chief, then the Duke of Gordon, pledged his support to the British-Hanoverian Government, but his clan remained Jacobite.

== History ==
=== Origins ===
The first Gordon on record is Richard of Gordon, previously of Swinton, said to have been the grandson of a famous Norman knight who slew some monstrous animal in the Merse during the time of King Malcolm III of Scotland. This Richard was Lord of the Barony of Gordon in the Merse. Richard de (of) Gordon probably died around 1200. Between 1150 and 1160 he granted from his estate a piece of land to the Monks of St. Mary at Kelso, a grant which was confirmed by his son Thomas Gordon. Other notable Gordons from this time include Bertram de Gordon who wounded King Richard of England with an arrow at Châlons.

Alicia Gordon, IV of the Gordon family was the heiress who married her cousin, Adam Gordon. Adam Gordon was a soldier who King Alexander III of Scotland sent with King Louis of France to Palestine. One tradition is that from Adam's grandson, Sir Adam, all of the Gordons in Scotland are descended. This Adam Gordon supported Sir William Wallace in 1297 to recapture the Castle of Wigtown from the English and Adam was made the Governor.

=== Wars of Scottish Independence ===
During the Wars of Scottish Independence Sir Adam Gordon, who had supported William Wallace, renounced his subsequent acceptance of the claims of Edward I of England and became a staunch supporter of Robert the Bruce. Adam was killed leading the Clan Gordon at the Battle of Halidon Hill in 1333 but his son Sir Alexander Gordon escaped and was the first Gordon to be designated "of Huntly".

Chief Sir John Gordon was killed leading the clan at the Battle of Otterburn where the English were defeated in 1388. His son, Chief Sir Adam Gordon, was killed leading the clan at the Battle of Homildon Hill, also known as the Battle of Humbleton Hill on 14 September 1402. The chief left his only child, a daughter named Elizabeth Gordon who married Alexander Seton, who was the son of Sir William Seton, chief of Clan Seton.

=== 15th century and clan conflicts ===
The Battle of Arbroath was fought in 1445 where Patrick Gordon of Methlic, a cousin of the Earl of Huntly, was killed fighting the Clan Lindsay. From this Patrick Gordon the Earls of Aberdeen descend.

In 1449 Alexander Seton, 1st Earl of Huntly, the eldest son of Elizabeth Gordon and Alexander Seton, Lord Gordon, changed the family name from Seton to Gordon.c. 1457. His male heirs through his third wife Elizabeth Crichton continued to bear the name of Gordon and were chiefs of Clan Gordon.

The chief of Clan Lindsay, Alexander Lindsay, the 4th Earl of Crawford, was badly defeated by the Clan Gordon and Clan Ogilvy under Alexander Gordon, 1st Earl of Huntly (previously Alexander Seton) at the Battle of Brechin in 1452.

The Gordons became involved in the deadly feud between the king and the Clan Douglas for power. The Gordons supported the king but when Gordon moved his forces south, the Earl of Moray who was an ally of the Douglases devastated the Gordon lands and burned Huntly Castle. However, the Gordons returned and soon defeated their enemies. Huntly Castle was rebuilt and when the Douglases were finally defeated the power of the Gordons grew unchallenged. In 1454 the Douglasses broke out in rebellion again and when confronted with the king in the south and Huntly in the north were soundly defeated, effectively ending the confederacy of the Douglasses, Rosses and Crawfords. For his notable contributions Alexander Gordon, 1st Earl of Huntly was styled Cock o' the North, a designation which has ever since been accorded to the heads of clan Gordon.

=== 16th century and clan conflicts ===
In 1513, during the Anglo-Scottish Wars, the Clan Gordon led by Alexander Gordon, 3rd Earl of Huntly fought at the Battle of Flodden.

In 1515, the title of Earl of Sutherland and chiefship of the Clan Sutherland passed by right of marriage to Adam Gordon who was a younger son of George Gordon, 2nd Earl of Huntly.

Later during the Anglo-Scottish Wars, George Gordon, 4th Earl of Huntly defeated an English army at the Battle of Haddon Rig in 1542 but the Gordons were later part of the Scottish army which was defeated at the Battle of Pinkie Cleugh in 1547.

Chief George Gordon, 4th Earl of Huntly was General of the forces on the Borders who opposed the forces of Henry VIII of England and Gordon had many victorious encounters. He was however later killed at the Battle of Corrichie in 1562 fighting against the forces of James Stuart, Earl of Moray (half-brother to Mary Queen of Scots). Gordon was killed and his son, Sir John, and other members of his family were later executed at Aberdeen.

Throughout the 16th century the Clan Gordon were involved in a long and bitter struggle against the Clan Forbes. In the 1520s there were murders by both sides, and one of the most prominent killed by the Forbeses was Seton of Meldrum who was a close connection of the Earl of Huntly, chief of Clan Gordon. The Earl of Huntly then became involved in a plot against the Master of Forbes, who was the son of the sixth Lord Forbes. The sixth Lord Forbes had been heavily implicated of the murder of Seton of Meldrum. The Master of Forbes was accused by the Earl of Huntly of conspiring to assassinate James V of Scotland in 1536 by shooting at him with a cannon. The Master of Forbes was tried and executed however just days later his conviction was reversed and the Forbes family was restored to favor. The Protestant Reformation added to the feud between the Clan Forbes and Clan Gordon in that the Gordons remained Catholic and the Forbeses became Protestant. The traditional enemies of the Forbses such as the Clan Leslie, Clan Irvine and Clan Seton sided with the Gordons while Protestant families such as the Clan Keith, Clan Fraser and Clan Crichton sided with the Clan Forbes. Twenty Gordons were killed at a banquet held at the Forbes's Druminnor Castle in 1571. Later in 1571 the feud climaxed with the Battle of Tillieangus, and the Battle of Craibstone, and Druminnor, then the seat of the chief of Clan Forbes was plundered. The Gordons followed this up with the massacre of twenty seven Forbeses of Towie at Corgarff Castle. It took two Acts of Parliament for the clans to put down their arms.

For two centuries from the mid-15th century the Clan Gordon and Clan Campbell controlled the north-east and west of Scotland respectively, as the magnates who straddled the divide between the Scottish Highlands and Scottish Lowlands. In 1594, Archibald Campbell, 7th Earl of Argyll was granted a Royal Commission against George Gordon, 6th Earl of Huntly but was defeated at the Battle of Glenlivet.

=== 17th century and Civil War ===
The register of the Privy Seal records that in 1615 a complaint was made from Alexander Leask of the Clan Leask that Adam Gordon, brother of the Laird of Gight, put violent hands upon him at the Yet of Leask, wounding him grievously. Later that year the Gordons again attacked the Leasks, setting upon a son of the chief for which George Gordon was outlawed. In 1616, William Leask of that Ilk was accosted by John Gordon of Ardlogy and a party of men with pistolets and hagbuts.

In the early 17th century Clan Gordon had a number of alliances by marriage or friendship. Among these was a strong bond to the Clan Burnett of Leys. The Gordon crest is emblazoned in plasterwork on the ceiling of the early 17th century great hall of Muchalls Castle built by Alexander Burnett.

In 1644 Alexander Bannerman of Pitmedden fought a duel with his cousin, Sir George Gordon of Haddo, and wounded him. Also in 1644 during the Civil War at the Battle of Aberdeen there were Gordons on both sides. Lord Lewis Gordon led his forces on the side of the Covenanters while Sir Nathaniel Gordon led his forces in support of the Royalists.

During the Civil War the second Marquess of Huntly was a fierce royalist and his followers have passed into history as the Gordon Horse and they figured very prominently in the campaigns of the great James Graham, 1st Marquess of Montrose. Cavalry from the Clan Gordon fought in support of the royalists at the Battle of Auldearn in 1645 where they helped to defeat the Covenanters of Lord Seaforth. The Clan Gordon fought at the Battle of Alford in 1645 where they were victorious, led by George Gordon, 2nd Marquess of Huntly. The Marquess of Huntly's eldest son George Gordon fell at this battle. Also in 1645, Lewis Gordon, clan chief and 3rd Marquess of Huntly burned Brodie Castle of the Clan Brodie.

In 1682 William Gordon of Cardoness Castle, was killed in a fight with Sir Godfrey McCulloch. McCulloch fled Scotland for a time, but returned, only to be apprehended and executed in 1697.

=== 18th century and Jacobite risings ===
==== Jacobite rising of 1715 ====
The Gordons fought on both sides during both the Jacobite rising of 1715 and the Jacobite rising of 1745. The second Duke of Gordon followed the Jacobites in 1715 and fought at the Battle of Sheriffmuir. General Wade's report on the Highlands in 1724, estimated the clan strength at 1,000 men.

==== Jacobite rising of 1745 ====
Cosmo Gordon, 3rd Duke of Gordon supported the British Government during the rising of 1745. However, his brother, Lord Lewis Gordon, raised two Jacobite regiments against the Hanoverians. The Gordon Jacobites fought at the Battle of Inverurie (1745), the Battle of Falkirk (1746) and the Battle of Culloden (1746).

=== British Army regiments ===
Two regiments named the "Gordon Highlanders" have been raised from the Clan Gordon. The first was the 81st Regiment of Foot (Aberdeenshire Highland Regiment) formed in 1777 by the Hon. Colonel William Gordon, son of the Earl of Aberdeen and was disbanded in 1783. The second was the 92nd (Gordon Highlanders) Regiment of Foot raised by Alexander the 4th Duke of Gordon in 1794.

== Chief and arms ==
- The Chief of Clan Gordon is Granville Charles Gomer Gordon, 13th Marquess of Huntly, Earl of Enzie, Earl of Aboyne, Lord Gordon of Badenoch, Lord Gordon of Strathavon and Glenlivet, Baron Meldrum of Morven.
- The Chief of Clan Gordon is known as: The Cock o' the North.
- Chief's Arms: Quarterly, 1st Azure three boars’ heads couped Or langued Gules (for Gordon), 2nd, Or three lions heads erased Gules langued Azure (for Lordship of Badenoch), 3rd, Or three crescents within a Royal Tressure flory counter flory Gules (for Seton), 4th, Azure three fraises Argent (for Fraser, acquisition of the Aboyne lands)

== Tartans ==
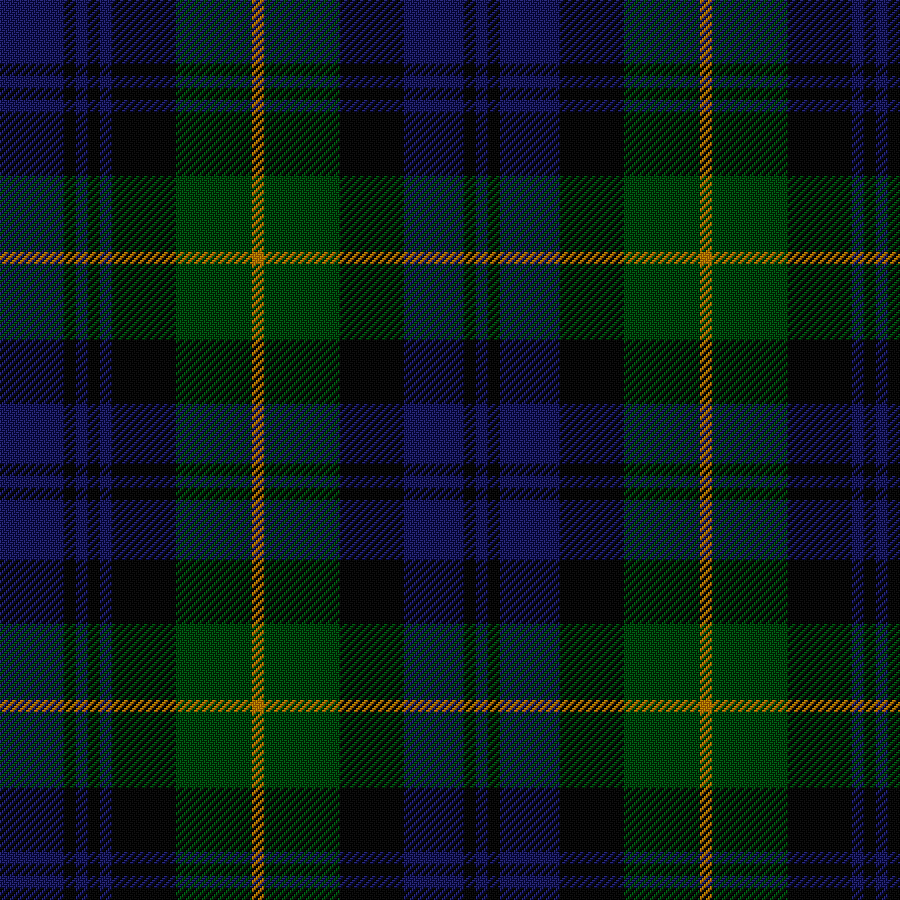
This version of the tartan is the predominantly used Gordon pattern today. The tartan the same as that of the 92nd (Gordon Highlanders) Regiment tartan, in turn based on Black Watch.

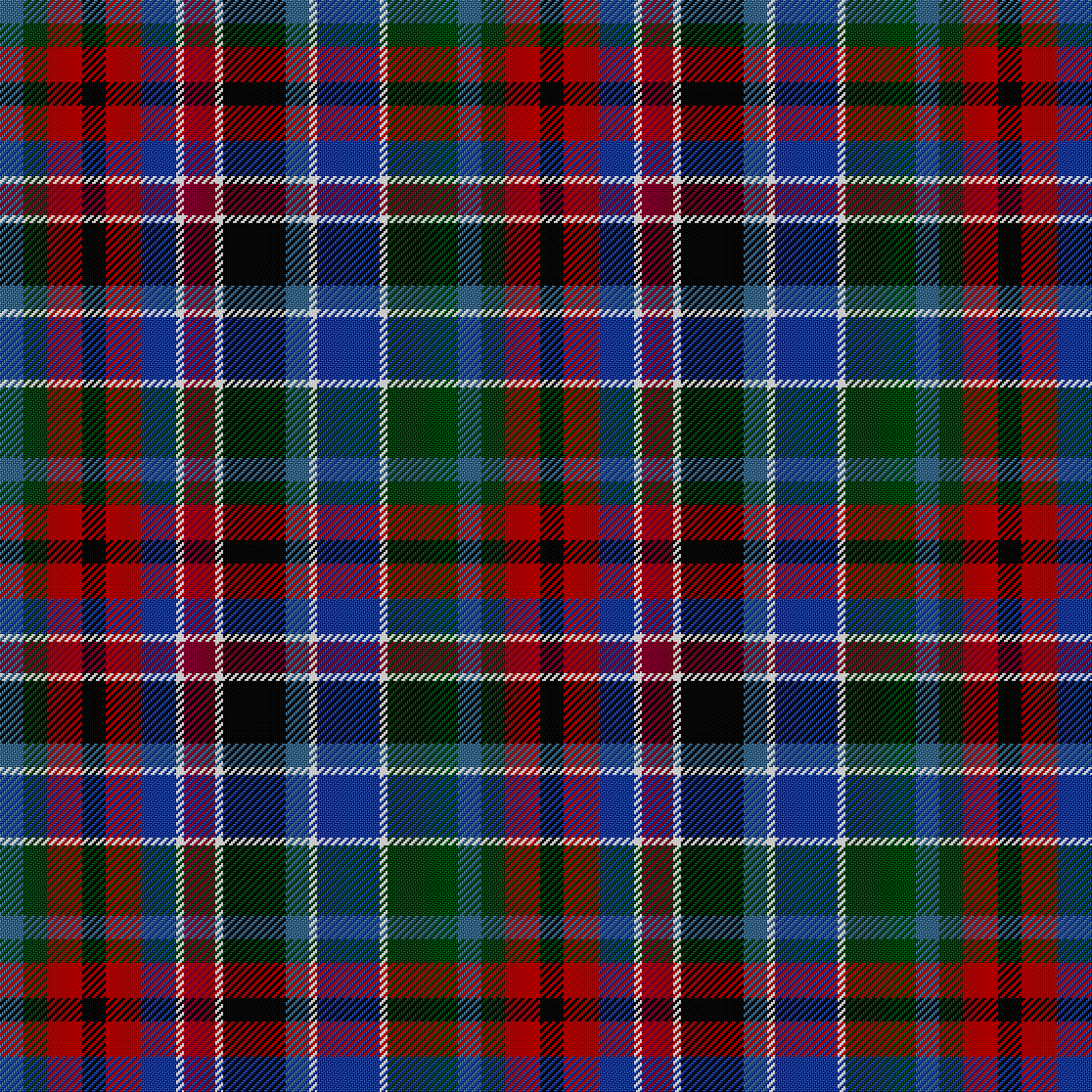
One of the Gordon red tartans, first recorded in 1930–1950, but probably considerably older

Clan Gordon has several recognized tartans, most of them predominantly green-blue-and-black, but also including dress patterns, some red-based ones, and some variants for specific branches of the clan.

The main Gordon tartan is based on that originally used by the 92nd (Gordon Highlanders) Regiment of Foot; the clan version has thinner black bands, and thin black "guard lines" on either side of the yellow over-check. The tartan is ultimately based on the Black Watch tartan, but with the yellow over-check added, and the single black over-check of Black Watch converted into a pair, like the rest of the black over-checks in the design. The 92nd later became the Gordon Highlanders in 1881, then amalgamated into the Highlanders (Seaforth, Gordons and Camerons) in 1994, which is now the Highlanders, 4th Battalion, Royal Regiment of Scotland (4 SCOTS). The modern unit (for dress) uses the Cameron of Erracht tartan, not a Gordon variant.

The main Gordon tartan has been used for many years as the troop tartan for the 10th Finchley (Scottish) Scout Group, London N3. The Scout Group was and still is unique in being the only group south of the border to wear kilts and actively maintains its links with the Gordon clan. Every four years (with a few exceptions) they camp in the grounds of Aboyne Castle and the Marquess would often attend Burns Night dinners as the guest of honour at the scout hall. The group's pipe band always plays "The Cock of the North 6/8 March" when returning to their hall following parades and every member wears a badge bearing the stag's head that forms part of the clan crest. A picture of the band outside their current scout hall shows all members wearing Gordon Tartan kilts. The ties go further, with the address of the scout hall being Gordon Hall, Huntly Drive, West Finchley, London, N3.

== Castles ==
Castles that have been owned by the Clan Gordon include, amongst many others:

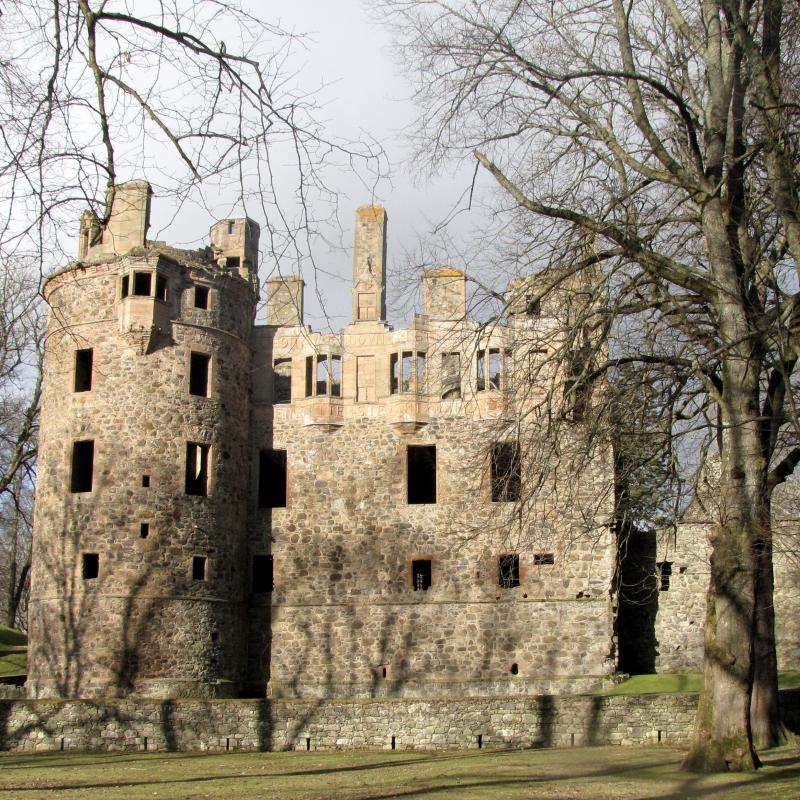
The ruins of Huntly Castle, historic seat of the Gordons of Huntly, chiefs of Clan Gordon.

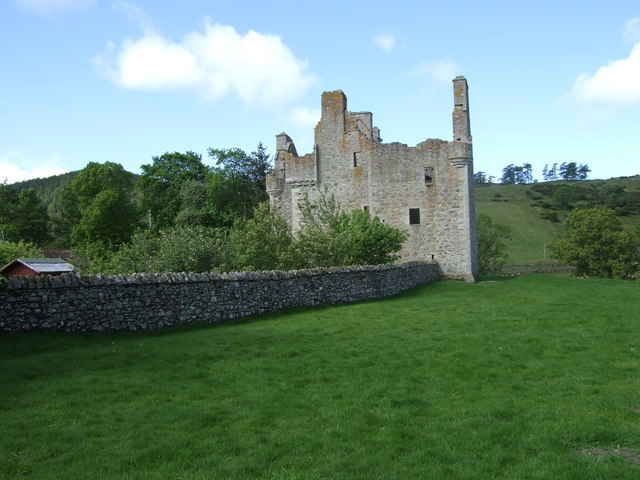
The ruins of Glenbuchat Castle, former seat of the Gordons of Glenbuchat.

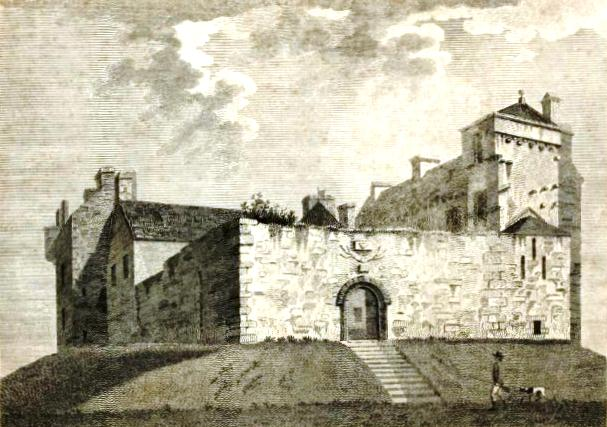
The ruins of Kenmure Castle, former seat of the Gordon Viscounts of Kenmure.

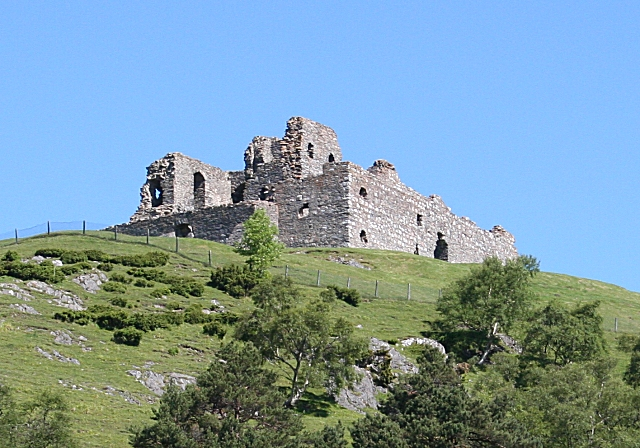
The ruins of Auchindoun Castle former seat of the Gordons of Auchindoun.

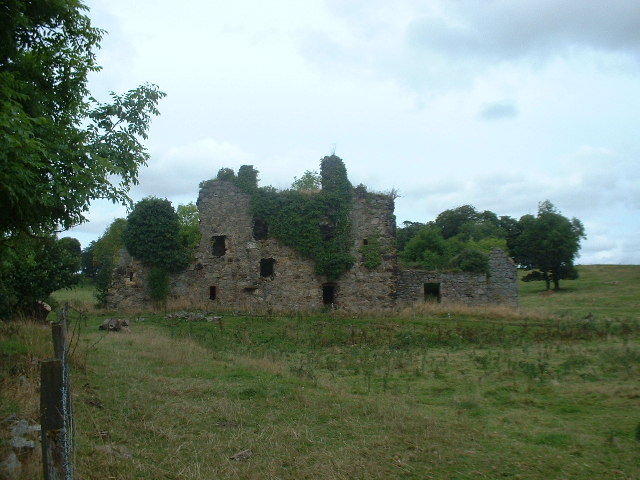
The ruins of Gight Castle, former seat of the Gordons of Gight.

- Gordon Castle, which once stood to the north of the village of Gordon, Scottish Borders, in Berwickshire was an old stronghold, although its exact location is not certain. The Gordons held the castle from the twelfth century, but as a result of supporting Robert the Bruce they were given lands in Strathbogie in Aberdeenshire. A mile from Strathbogie was Huntly where the Gordons also had a castle, and it was Huntly that gave its name to the Gordon's more famous stronghold that was originally known as Strathbogie, in Aberdeenshire.
- Huntly Castle, just to the north of Huntly in Aberdeenshire is now a ruin that consists of a large rectangular block with a substantial round tower at one end, with the remains of a courtyard and other buildings. There are the remains of decorative stone work and three oriel windows on the upper part of the building. The lands had passed from the Clan Seton to the Clan Gordon in the fourteenth century. The original castle was torched by the Clan Douglas in 1452 and was re-built. The name of the property was changed from Strathbogie to Huntly in 1506. During the Jacobite rising of 1745 the castle was garrisoned by Hanoverian soldiers but by then had been abandoned as a residence. Some of the materials from Huntly Castle were used to build what is now the Huntly Castle Hotel.
- Gordon Castle, is eight and a half miles east of Elgin, Moray, and the Gordons had a castle there since the fifteenth century. In the eighteenth century it was enlarged and remodeled for the Duke of Gordon. It was sold to the government in 1936 and became deteriorated during World War II. The castle was later bought back by the Gordon-Lennox family but most of it was demolished apart from the six story block and two separate wings.
- Abergeldie Castle, five miles west of Ballater, Aberdeenshire, dates from the sixteenth century. Abergeldie was held by the Gordons from 1482. In 1547 James Gordon of Abergeldie was killed at the Battle of Pinkie Cleugh and in 1562 Alexander Gordon of Abergeldie took part in the earl of Huntly's rising against Mary, Queen of Scots. He was also at the Battle of Glenlivet in 1594. During the feud with the Clan Forbes over land, seven sons of Gordon of Knock were murdered by Forbes of Strathgirnock and as a result Forbes was executed by Gordon of Abergeldie. The castle was burnt by the Clan Mackenzie in 1592.
- Glenbuchat Castle, four miles west of Kildrummy, Aberdeenshire, dates from 1590. It was seized by James VI of Scotland during Huntly's rising of 1594. Brigadier-General John Gordon of Glenbuchat fought for the Jacobites in both the risings of 1715 and 1745, leading the Gordons and Farquharsons at the Battle of Culloden. He escaped to Norway and died in France. The castle was a ruin by 1738 and was sold to the Duff Earl of Fife. It was then replaced with Glenbuchat House and the old castle is now in the care of Historic Scotland.
- Rothiemay Castle, at Milltown of Rothiemay, dated from the fifteenth century. It stood five miles north of Huntly. Mary, Queen of Scots may have stayed here during Huntly's rebellion of 1562. In 1618 the castle was attacked by George Gordon of Gight. In 1630 William Gordon of Rothiemay and others were burnt to death at the castle of Frendraught in suspicious circumstances. James Crichton of Frendraught had not been on good terms with Rothiemay but he was cleared of involvement. However, Lady Rothiemay employed Highlanders to attack Crichton's property and as a result she was imprisoned in 1635 but later released.
- Haddo House, ten miles north west of Ellon, Aberdeenshire, stands on the site of a stronghold that was held by the Gordons from 1429. Patrick Gordon of Haddo was killed at the Battle of Arbroath in 1446. Sir John Gordon of Haddo was made a Baronet of Nova Scotia in 1642 and actively supported James Graham, 1st Marquess of Montrose during the Civil War, but was captured after being besieged in the castle. Haddo House is now in the care of the National Trust for Scotland.
- Fyvie Castle, a mile north of Fyvie, Aberdeenshire, was held by the Gordon Earls of Aberdeen from 1733 to 1889.
- Kenmure Castle, a mile south of New Galloway was originally held by the Balliols but passed to the Gordons of Lochinvar in about 1297. It was torched after the Gordons welcomed Mary, Queen of Scots there in 1568. In 1633 Sir John Gordon was made Viscount of Kenmure. The castle was burned again by Oliver Cromwell in 1650 after the Gordons had supported Charles I of England. William Gordon, sixth Viscount Kenmure was beheaded in the Tower of London after being captured at the Battle of Preston (1715) fighting for the Jacobites. The property and title were recovered in 1824 and the castle had been restored from a ruin. The castle was visited by Robert Burns but as a result of a fire in 1950 it was stripped of materials.
- Auchindoun Castle near Dufftown is a ruinous L-plan tower house that was originally held by the Clan Ogilvy but passed to the Gordons in 1535. Adam Gordon of Auchindoun was the leader of a party of Gordons who torched the Forbes's Corgarff Castle killing Margaret Campbell who was the wife of Forbes of Towie along with her family and retainers. Auchindoun Castle itself may have been burned in 1544 or 1671. The castle was sacked after James Stewart, 2nd Earl of Moray was murdered at Donibristle by Gordon, Marquess of Huntly and Sir Patrick Gordon of Auchindoun in 1592. Sir Patrick Gordon of Auchindoun was later killed at the Battle of Glenlivet in 1594. The castle is in the care of Historic Scotland.
- Gight Castle, at Gight, near Fyvie, Aberdeenshire, was held by the Gordons of Gight and William Gordon of Gight was killed at the Battle of Flodden in 1513. The sixth Gordon laird of Gight broke his sword across the head of the Laird of Leask. The seventh Gordon laird of Gight was a Tax collector who virtually plundered the town of Banff, Aberdeenshire and kept all of the money. The heiress, Catherine Gordon of Gight, married John "Mad Jack" Byron and they were the parents of the poet Lord Byron. John Byron had to sell the estate due to debts and it was acquired by the Gordon Earls of Aberdeen.
- Aboyne Castle, near Aboyne, Aberdeenshire, is the current seat of the Marquess of Huntly, chief of Clan Gordon.

== See also ==
- Marquess of Huntly
- Marquess of Aberdeen and Temair
- Duke of Gordon
- Lord Byron {George Gordon Byron, 6th Baron Byron}
- Gordon Highlanders
- Gordon Riots
