= Clan Leask =

Scottish clan

- Crest: A crescent Argent
- Motto: Virtute Cresco (Lat. I grow by virtue)

Profile
- Region: Highlands

Chief
- Jonathan Leask of that Ilk
- Chief of the Name and Arms of Leask
Allied clans
Clan Hay
Rival clans
Clan Gordon

Clan Leask is a Scottish clan.

== History ==
=== Origins ===
There are several possible origins of the surname Leask. One possibility is that it is a diminutive of the Anglo-Saxon word lisse, which means happy. In the Norse language it means a stirring fellow. Professor Leask of Aberdeen believed that the ancestor of the Leasks was Liscus who was chief of the Haedui, a tribe of Gauls who were described by Julius Caesar during his Gallic Wars. One of the greatest fortresses in France was the Castle of Boulogne, a possession of Charlemagne which at one time belonged to a family called de Lesque. An early reference to the name is that of Erik Leask who was reputedly chamberlain to the king of Denmark.

In 1296 William de Laskereske appears on the Ragman Rolls submitting to Edward I of England. In about 1345 William Leask received a charter of confirmation to his lands of Leskgoroune or Leskgaranne from David II of Scotland, son of Robert the Bruce. He might be the same William Leysk who was recorded in the parish records of the church at Ellon, Aberdeenshire as: William de Laysk, the elder, Lord of that Ilk, bequeathed a pound of wax yearly to the altar of the Holyrood in the church of St Mary of Ellon.

In 1390 the second known chief of Clan Leask who was ballie of the barony of Findon, inherited half of the lands of Henry de Brogan, Lord of Achlowne. He also appears as a witness to a charter by the Earl of Orkney in 1391.

=== 15th and 16th centuries ===
In the middle of the 15th century a younger son of Leask went to Orkney at the request of the earl, who had formed a court at Kirkwall Palace. There a branch of the Clan Leask was formed which still shows the longest unbroken male lines of the clan.

The third chief of Clan Leask, Wilfred, signed a bond of Manrent in favour of William Hay, Earl of Erroll in 1456 and also resigned his lands in favour of his son and heir. From this point onwards the connection with the Clan Hay appears to have remained strong. When the Cheynes of Esslemont allied themselves with the Hays their bond was signed at the Chapel of Laske in 1499.

In 1574 following the deposition of Mary, Queen of Scots, William Leask, seventh chief of Clan Leask signed an oath of allegiance to the child James VI of Scotland.

=== 17th century ===
The register of the Privy Seal records that in 1615 a complaint was made from Alexander Leask that Adam Gordon, brother of the Laird of Gight, put violent hands upon him at the Yet of Leask, wounding him grievously. Later that year the Gordons again attacked the Leasks, setting upon a son of the chief for which George Gordon was outlawed. In 1616, William Leask of that Ilk was accosted by John Gordon of Ardlogy and a party of men with pistolets and hagbuts.

In 1672 Alexander Leask of that Ilk was amongst the noblemen who recorded their coats of arms in a newly established public register. Towards the end of the seventeenth century disaster overtook the family after they invested in the failed Darien scheme, a trading venture with Central America intended to rival the East India Company that had been established in London. Alexander Leask of that Ilk, the thirteenth chief was forced to give up his estates which were taken over by Robert Cumming.

== The clan today ==
Little is known of the Clan Leask between the disaster of the late seventeenth century until 1963, when a descendant managed to buy back a portion of the family lands and established the Leask Society, with the support of other prominent Leasks. This includes Lieutenant General Sir Henry Leask, who was a governor of Edinburgh Castle and General Officer commanding the Army in Scotland. In 1968 Moira Anne Helgesen was granted the chiefship of the clan by the Lord Lyon King of Arms, whereupon she changed her name and became: Madam Anne Leask of Leask. She died in April 2008 and was succeeded in the chiefship of the clan by Jonathan Leask, who became the 23rd chief of Clan Leask.

== See also ==
- Scottish clan
