= Gight =

Coordinates: 57.449°N 2.284°W

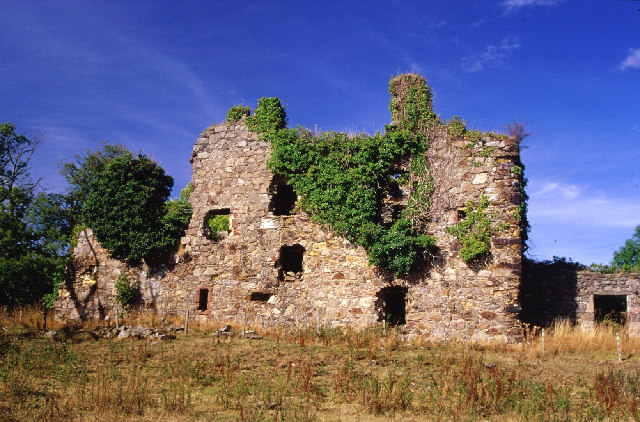
- Gight Castle

- Location within Aberdeenshire
- OS grid reference: NJ825401
- Council area: Aberdeenshire
- Lieutenancy area: Aberdeenshire
- Country: Scotland
- Sovereign state: United Kingdom
- Post town: ELLON
- Postcode district: AB41
- Dialling code: 01651
- Police: Scotland
- Fire: Scottish
- Ambulance: Scottish
- UK Parliament: Gordon and Buchan
- Scottish Parliament: Aberdeenshire East

Gight is an estate in the parish of Fyvie in the Formartine area of Aberdeenshire, Scotland. It is best known as the location of the 16th-century Gight (or Formartine) Castle, ancestral home of Lord Byron.

== Gight Castle ==
Designations

Scheduled monument
- Official name: Gight Castle
- Type: Industrial: milestone, guide plate, direction post, Secular: castle; garden
- Designated: 13 May 1965
- Reference no.: SM2508

Gight Castle is about 4 miles (6.4 km) miles east of Fyvie, just north of the River Ythan, and 1 mile (1.6 km) mile south of Cottown.

The castle was built to an L-shaped plan, probably in the 1570s by George Gordon, the second laird. Ranges of outbuildings were built later.

The tower has a vaulted basement, and a turnpike stair at the end of a long passage. There was a hall on the first floor.

George Gordon had no children, and the property passed to his brother, James Gordon of Cairnbannoch and Gight. His son Alexander married Agnes Beaton, daughter of David Beaton, Archbishop of St Andrews. Alexander was killed at Dundee in 1579, and his daughter Elizabeth married George Home, 1st Earl of Dunbar in 1590.

It was later occupied by Catherine Gordon Byron, the mother of Lord Byron, but she sold it in 1787 to George Gordon, 3rd Earl of Aberdeen to pay off her debts. It was then occupied by the Earl's son, George Gordon, Lord Haddo, until the latter's early death in 1791, since when it has been uninhabited. It was designated a scheduled monument in 1965.

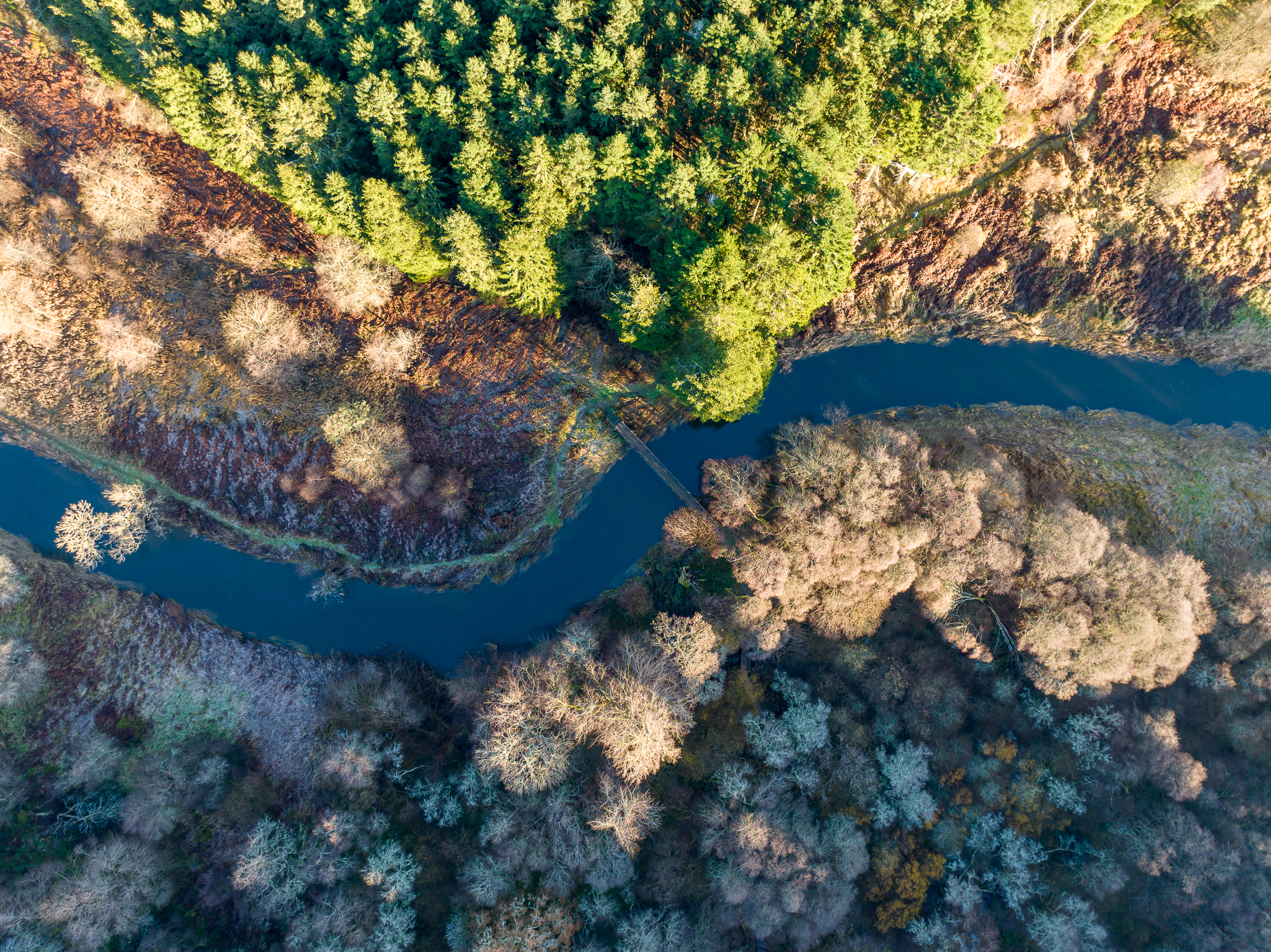
The Burn of Stonehouse in Gight Woods

Gight Woods is designated as a Site of Special Scientific Interest for its ancient mixed broadleaved woodland and associated natural features.

== Folklore ==
It is said that the ruins are haunted by a piper who disappeared while exploring an underground passageway.

Another local legend holds that Gight Castle was cursed by the Scottish prophet Thomas the Rhymer, who is said to have proclaimed “At Gight three men by sudden death shall dee, And after that the land shall lie in lea”. Later events associated with the castle were subsequently interpreted in folklore as having fulfilled this prophecy.

The nearby river below the ruins also features in legend as the hiding place of a treasure said to have been concealed by the 7th laird and guarded by the Devil.
