= Saltcoats Castle =

Coordinates: 56.027014°N 2.827232°W

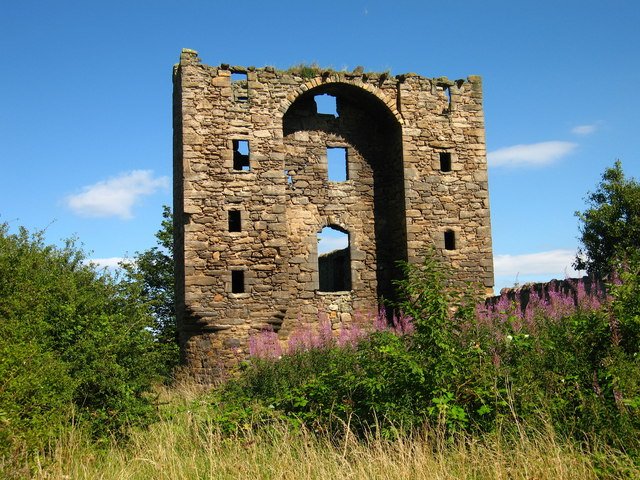
- Ruins of Saltcoats Castle
- Interactive map of the Saltcoats Castle area

General information
- Location: East Lothian, Gullane, Scotland
- Completed: 16th century

Saltcoats Castle is a courtyard castle dating from the sixteenth century, about .5 miles (0.80 km) south of Gullane in East Lothian, Scotland. It is designated a scheduled monument.

== History ==
Saltcoats Castle was a property of the Livingstones. Thereafter it passed to the Hamiltons of Pencaitland in the 18th century. It was occupied until after 1800, but it was partly demolished in 1820.

On 26 January 1601 Jean Douglas, Lady Saltcoats, wrote to her brother Archibald Douglas for fine London cloth for gowns for her daughters, who were of age to marry.

== Structure ==
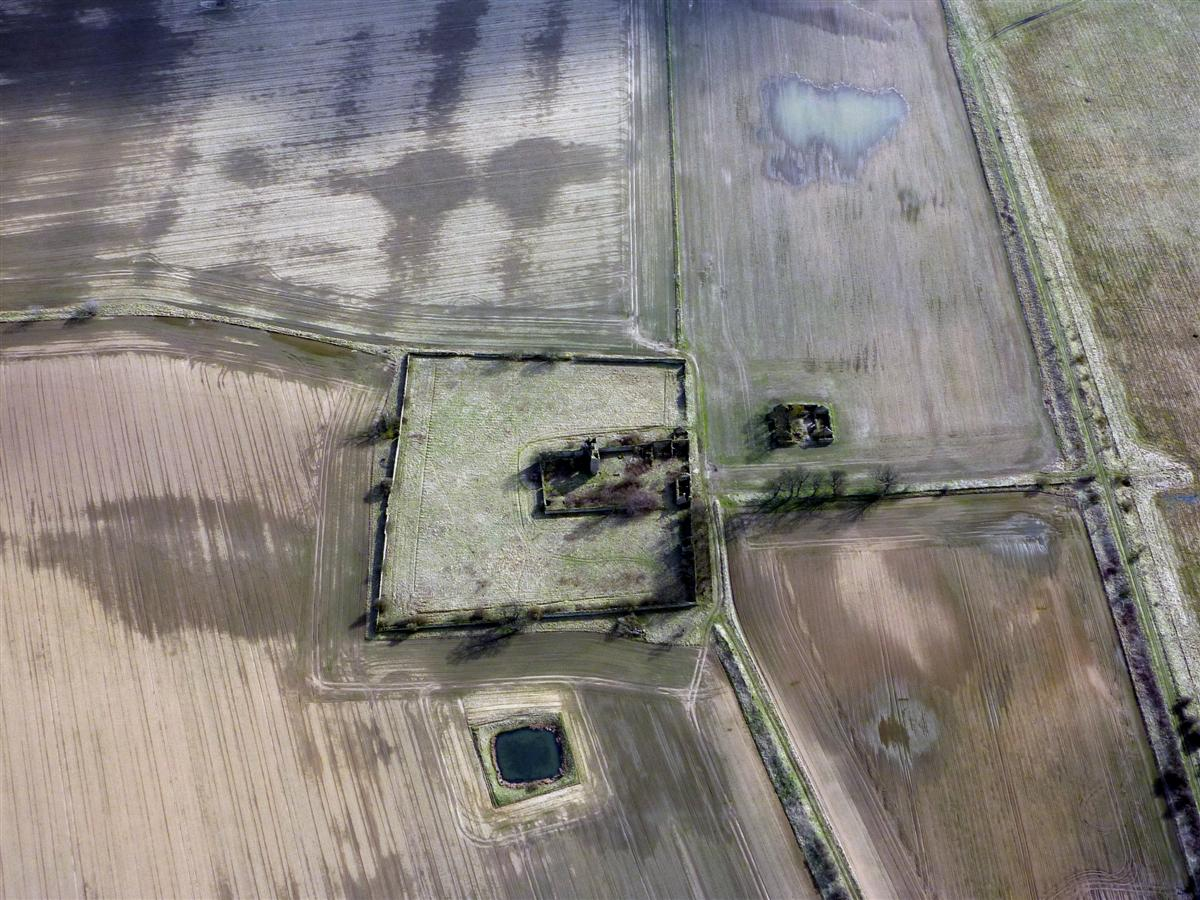
Aerial view of the castle and grounds

The castle construction was unusual. Three sides of the courtyard were ranges of buildings two storeys high, with attics. The western side comprises two towers, rounded at the bases but corbelled out to square above the level of the basement. An arch, once carrying a parapet, joins the towers. There are gunloops in the walls and a vaulted basement.

The armorial stone of the builder, Patrick Levingstoun of Saltcoats, is now mounted over the door of a cottage nearby. The date appears to be 1592.

There is a lectern type dovecot, 17 by 15 feet (5.2 by 4.6 m), in the boundary wall of the castle. It is now roofless. The partly buttressed walls are built of rubble, with dressings and one setback course. It has crow-stepped gables. In the south gable there are six entry holes in a grid; around 200 nests remain.

A surviving oak bed at Biggar Museum, was made for Margaret Fawside of Fa'side Castle, who married Patrick Levingstoun of Saltcoats in 1598, and is carved with their heraldry.
