= Alexander Gordon, 1st Earl of Huntly =

Scottish magnate

The Right Honourable The Earl of Huntly
- Coat of arms of the Earls of Huntly

Personal details
- Died: 15 July 1470 Huntly
- Spouse(s): Egidia Hay; Elizabeth Crichton
- Children: 11
- Parent(s): Alexander Seton, Lord Gordon; Elizabeth Gordon, Heiress of Gordon

Alexander Seton, 1st Earl of Huntly (died 15 July 1470), who adopted the family name of Gordon from about 1457, was a powerful 15th-century Scottish magnate. He was knighted in 1439/1440 and was Lord of Badenoch, Gordon, Strathbogie and Cluny.

== Life ==
He was the son of Alexander Seton, Lord Gordon (died 1440) (2nd son of Sir William Seton of that Ilk), by his spouse Elizabeth Gordon (died 16 March 1439), daughter and heiress of Sir Adam Gordon of that Ilk. In 1435 he accompanied the princess Margaret to France to marry the 9th Dauphin of France. In a charter dated 23 February 1439–40, he is styled Sir Alexander Seton of Tullibody, heir of Elizabeth Gordon. The charter confirmed an earlier exchange of lands between Sir William Keith and Margaret Fraser (his maternal grandparents) and William Lindsay, Lord of Byres exchanging lands for that of Dunottar.

He succeeded his father as Lord Gordon before April 1441. Alexander then resigned his lands to the king on 3 April 1441 and in return was granted a charter to himself and his wife Elizabeth of the lordships of Gordon, county Berwick; Strathbogie, Aboyne, Glentanner and Glenmuick, in Aberdeenshire; and Panbride in county Forfar; to be held in liferent and by their son George Gordon in fee as well as his lawful male heirs.

In 1449, Alexander was raised to the peerage and created the first Earl of Huntly by King James II of Scotland, sometime before 3 July of that year when he witnessed a charter to James Hamilton, 1st Lord Hamilton under that title. Later in the year he was present at the gates of Arbroath Abbey when the Ogilvies and Lindsays were disputing their claims to the office of justiciary of that abbey; where the Ogilvies were defeated and Earl Alexander, there in support of that family, had to flee the field himself.

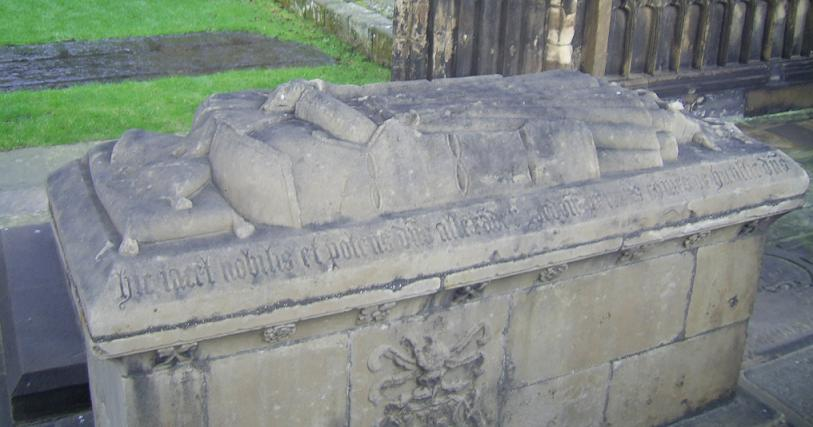
Tomb of Alexander Gordon, in Elgin Cathedral

He was embroiled in struggles against the Douglases, against the Lords of the Isles, and against the Lindsay earls of Crawford while being closely aligned with William Crichton, the Chancellor. On 28 April 1451 he received a charter from the king of the lordship of Badenoch and the castle of Ruthven. Gordon fought on the King's side against the Douglases during The Douglas Rebellion and soundly defeated the Crawfords at the Battle of Brechin 18 May 1452.

Huntly adopted the family name of Gordon about 1457. He died on 15 July 1470 at Huntly Castle and was buried in Elgin Cathedral.

== Family ==
Alexander Gordon married first, c. 8 January 1426 Egidia Hay, daughter and heir of John Hay of Tullibody. Together they had a son:

- Alexander Seton, ancestor of the Setons of Touch, and Abercorn; succeeded to his mother's lands.

He obtained an annulment to this marriage in 1438 in order to marry Elizabeth Crichton, daughter of William Crichton, the Chancellor of Scotland. (Note: On 18 March 1439–40 Alexander Seton and his second wife Elizabeth Crichton had a charter limiting the entail of the estate to children of their marriage only, with remainder to Alexander's heirs whomsoever. This is why their eldest son George Seton, later George Gordon, was his father's heir to the lordships and to the Earldom of Huntly and not his older half-brother Alexander. See SP, IV, 524; Aboyne Records, 394.) Alexander and Elizabeth had the following children:

- George Gordon, 2nd Earl of Huntly, succeeded to the earldom and his father's lordships
- Sir Alexander Gordon of Midmar, later of Abergeldie, married Beatrix Hay, daughter of William Hay, 1st Earl of Erroll
- Adam Gordon, Dean of Caithness
- William Gordon
- Margaret Gordon, before 9 November 1457 contracted to marry Nicholas Hay, 2nd Earl of Erroll but for some reason did not and he married her sister Elizabeth.
- Elizabeth Gordon (died 17 Apr 1500), married Nicholas Hay, 2nd Earl of Erroll, and then after his death she remarried, John Kennedy, 2nd Lord Kennedy, and had issue by her second husband
- Christian Gordon, married William Forbes, 3rd Lord Forbes, on 8 July 1468, and had issue
- Lady Catherine Gordon, on 30 September 1461 she was contracted to marry Archibald (then aged 12), eldest son of George Douglas, 4th Earl of Angus but the marriage did not take place

Alexander Gordon had two additional children by a daughter of Cumming of Altyre, identified by her byname 'the Fair Maid of Moray'. Some have claimed there is no record of a marriage between them, but it has been recorded elsewhere that a copy of their contract of marriage was among the later Marquess of Huntly's charters. Alexander's two additional children by the Fair Maid of Moray were:

- Janet (died 1470–73), married to James Innes of Innes
- Margaret (died c. 1506), married in 1484 to Hew Rose, 6th (or 8th) Lord of Kilravock

== Notes ==
Peerage of Scotland
| New creation | Earl of Huntly; 1445–1470 | Succeeded by George Gordon |
