= Clan Seton =

Scottish clan

- Motto: "Hazard Yet Forward" or "Forward Ours"

Profile
- Region: Lowlands
- Plant badge: Yew
- Clan Seton no longer has a chief, and is an armigerous clan
- Historic seat: Seton Castle
- Last Chief: George Seton, 5th Earl of Winton
Clan branches
Seton Earls of Winton (historic chiefs)
Seton Earls of Dunfermline
Seton of Abercorn
See also: Seton baronets
Allied clans
Clan Gordon
Clan Montgomery

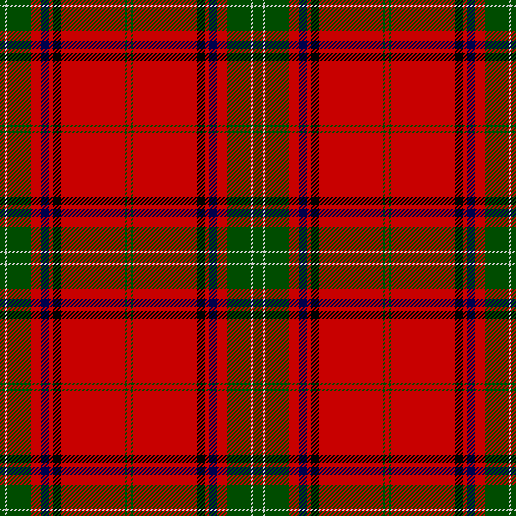
Seton tartan as it appears in the Vestiarium Scoticum

Clan Seton is a Scottish clan which does not currently have a chief; therefore, it is considered an armigerous clan.

== History ==
=== Origins of the clan ===
The village of Sai in Normandy is believed to have given its name to Seton in Scotland by 1150 when Alexander de Seton witnessed a charter by David I of Scotland. The Chiefs of Clan Seton share a common origin with the Chiefs of Highland Clan Gordon.

=== Wars of Scottish Independence ===
Sir Christopher Seton (died 1306) secured the family's fortunes by marrying a sister of Robert the Bruce. In March 1306 he was a witness at Bruce's coronation in Scone.

Seton is also have said to have saved the king's life when he was unhorsed during the Battle of Methven in June 1306. Seton was captured at the battle by the English and was executed in London with great brutality. In 1320, Sir Alexander Seton, who was probably Sir Christopher's brother, signed the Declaration of Arbroath that asserted Scottish independence. Sir Alexander Seton was later Governor of Berwick from 1327 until 1333, when the town surrendered to the English.

The English had already hanged Seton's son whom they had held as a hostage. Seton's remaining two sons were also both killed – one drowning in a sea battle with an English fleet and the other was killed fighting Edward Balliol. His daughter, Margaret (who married Alan de Wyntoun, a paternal cadet of the Seton family), therefore succeeded to the estates and it was her son who took the Seton surname and was created the first Lord Seton.

=== 15th and 16th centuries ===
William Seton, 1st Lord Seton attended the coronation of Robert II of Scotland. One of Lord Seton's sons married Elizabeth of Gordon and became ancestor to the Earls and Marquesses of Huntly, chiefs of Clan Gordon. (Alexander Gordon, 1st Earl of Huntly was born Alexander Seton but adopted his mother's surname).

George Seton, 5th Lord Seton was a favourite of James IV of Scotland and died with him at the Battle of Flodden. The Setons were supporters of Mary, Queen of Scots, and in 1557 George Seton, 7th Lord Seton attended the queen's wedding to the Dauphin of Viennois. Seton became her Privy Councillor, Master of the Household and a close personal friend. Seton helped the queen to escape on the night of the murder of her secretary, David Rizzio, firstly to Seton Castle in East Lothian and then to Dunbar.

When the queen's husband, Henry Stuart, Lord Darnley, was killed she again turned to Seton for help and it was in Seton Castle that the marriage contract with James Hepburn, 4th Earl of Bothwell was sealed. In 1568, when the queen was imprisoned in Lochleven Castle it was Seton, with two hundred lancers, who aided her escape.

After the queen was defeated at the Battle of Langside in 1568, Seton retired to Flanders where he tried to enlist in foreign service. Two years later he returned to Scotland and was one of the judges on the trial of the Earl of Morton who was accused of complicity in the murder of Darnley. Seton's portrait now hangs in the National Portrait Gallery. He was succeeded by his second son, Robert, who James VI of Scotland created Earl of Winton in 1600.

=== 17th and 18th centuries ===
The Earl of Winton's brother, Alexander Seton, was created Lord President of the Court of Session which is Scotland's highest judicial office and later Chancellor of Scotland. In 1606, Alexander Seton was created Earl of Dunfermline.

The Setons were staunch Jacobites and James Seton, 4th Earl of Dunfermline forfeited his title for supporting John Graham, 1st Viscount Dundee in 1689 as did George Seton, 5th Earl of Winton after the Jacobite rising of 1715. Another branch of the clan, the Setons of Abercorn, were created Baronets of Nova Scotia in 1663. Sir Alexander Seton, 1st Baronet was appointed to the Supreme Court bench in 1677 and was created a Baronet of Nova Scotia in 1684.

Some members of the family moved to France, where they belonged to the Scottish Guard of the King. In particular Jacques Seton, s^{r} de Lavenage becomes a lieutenant of the Scottish Guard, but becomes famous for another reason: since Mazarin wants French people to replace Scottish ones, he loses part and then the entirety of his job. Mazarin then proposes to him to be in charge of the French printmaking system, which was till then a free trade (1660). But the printmakers protested, the idea failed and printmaking was confirmed a free trade, by royal edict.

== Memorials ==
Port Seton, Seton Collegiate Church and Seton Castle are all on the coast south of Edinburgh and stand as memorials to the clan. The Earldom moved to the Setons of Garleton and then to the Seaton Broad-bent family. The Earldom is now dormant.

== Castles ==
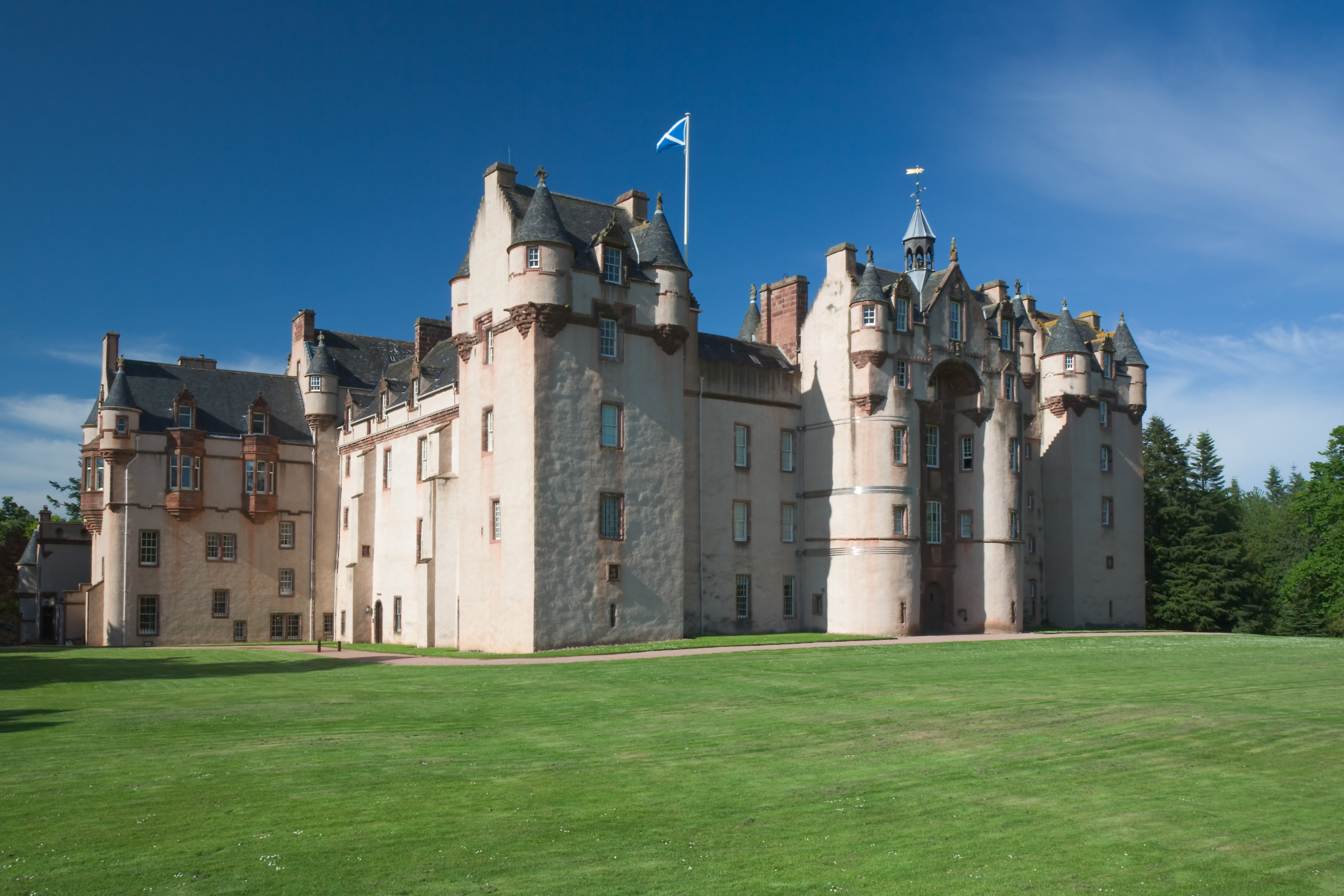
Fyvie Castle was once a seat of the Clan Seton.

Castles that have belonged to the Clan Seton have included amongst many others:

- Seton Castle, also known as Seton House, was the main seat of the Clan Seton.
- Fyvie Castle.
- Winton House.
- Abercorn Castle.

== See also ==
- Armigerous clan
- Scottish clan
- Earl of Winton
- Seton Collegiate Church
- Seton baronets
- Earl of Dunfermline
