= Marquess of Huntly =

Title in the Peerage of Scotland

Marquessate of Huntly
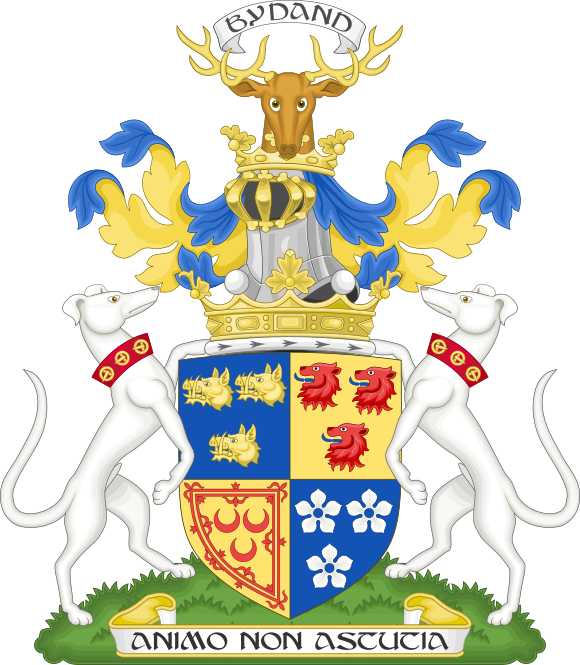
- Arms: Quarterly: 1st, Azure, three Boars' Heads couped Or, langued Gules (for Gordon); 2nd, Or, three Lion's Heads erased Gules, langued Azure (for Badenoch); 3rd, Or, three Crescents within a Double-Tressure flory counterflory Gules (for Seton); 4th, Azure, three Cinquefoils Argent (for Fraser). Crest: Out of a Ducal Coronet Or, a Stag's Head and Neck affronty proper, attired with ten Tynes Or. Supporters: On either side a Greyhound Argent, gorged with a Collar Gules, charged with three Buckles Or.
- Creation date: 17 April 1599
- Created by: King James VI
- Peerage: Peerage of Scotland
- First holder: George Gordon, 6th Earl of Huntly
- Present holder: Granville Gordon, 13th Marquess of Huntly
- Heir apparent: Alastair Gordon, Earl of Aboyne
- Remainder to: the 1st Marquess's heirs male of the body lawfully begotten
- Subsidiary titles: Earl of Huntly; Earl of Enzie; Earl of Aboyne; Lord Gordon of Badenoch; Lord Gordon of Strathavon and Glenlivet; Baron Meldrum
- Status: Extant
- Seat: Aboyne Castle
- Former seat: Huntly Castle
- Motto: BYDAND (Remaining); ANIMO NON ASTUTIA (By courage not by stratagem)

Marquess of Huntly is a title in the Peerage of Scotland that was created on 17 April 1599 for George Gordon, 6th Earl of Huntly. It is the oldest existing marquessate in Scotland, and the second-oldest in the British Isles; only the English marquessate of Winchester is older. The Marquess holds the following subsidiary titles: Lord Gordon of Strathaven and Glenlivet and Earl of Aboyne (1660; Peerage of Scotland), and Baron Meldrum, of Morven in the County of Aberdeen (1815; Peerage of the United Kingdom). (Note: The current Marquess may or may not also hold the subsidiary titles: Earl of Huntley (1445), Earl of Enzie and Lord Gordon of Badenoch (1599) all in the Peerage of Scotland. He is entitled to these per their remainders, but the House of Lords denied the 9th Marquess's accession to those titles.)

== Early family history ==
The Gordon family descends from Sir Adam Gordon of Huntly, killed at the Battle of Humbleton Hill in 1402 and succeeded in his estates by his daughter Elizabeth Gordon, wife of Alexander Seton, who assumed the surname of Gordon for himself and "all his heirs male." He was created Earl of Huntly in the Peerage of Scotland in 1445 and was succeeded by his son, the second Earl, who served as Lord Chancellor of Scotland from 1498 to 1501. His younger son, the Hon. Adam Gordon, married Elizabeth, suo jure Countess of Sutherland. Their grandson, John Gordon, succeeded his grandmother in the earldom in 1535 (see Earl of Sutherland for further history about this branch of the family).

Lord Huntly's elder son, the third Earl, was a member of the Council of Regency in 1517. He was succeeded by his grandson, the fourth Earl, Lord Chancellor of Scotland from 1546 to 1562, who was killed in the latter year, and in 1563 an Act of Attainder was passed through Parliament with all his titles forfeited. His eldest surviving son, George Gordon, was condemned to death for treason in 1563 but later pardoned. He obtained a reversal of his father's attainder in 1567 and served as Lord Chancellor of Scotland.

George Gordon, became the 1st Marquess, he was the son of the 5th earl; born in 1562, educated in France as a Roman Catholic. He was part of a plot to conspire against King James VI. He worked as captain of the guard of Holyrood before the discovery of treason. He went about clan feuds and started a private war, this inspired the ballad The Bonnie Earl O' Moray. He was succeeded by his son. Earl of Enzie and Marquess of Huntly in the Peerage of Scotland. His son was raised protestant in England; in the civil war he became a royalist and in 1647 was given a pardon for his actions, yet later beheaded. He was succeeded by his elder son, the second Marquess.

== 17th century onward ==
In 1632, four years before his father's death, the seventh Earl was created Viscount Aboyne in the Peerage of Scotland in his own right, with remainder that the title should be passed on to his second son the Hon. James Gordon on his death or on the death of his father, whichever came first.

When he died two years later the titles passed to his son, the third Marquess. In 1661 the attainder of 1649 was revoked by Act of Parliament. In 1684 Lord Huntly was created Lord Badenoch, Lochaber, Strathavon, Balmore, Auchindoun, Garthie and Kincardine, Viscount of Inverness, Earl of Huntly and Enzie and Duke of Gordon. All four titles were in the Peerage of Scotland. He was succeeded by his son, the second Duke. He was a supporter of the Old Pretender. Gordon married Lady Henrietta, daughter of Charles Mordaunt, 3rd Earl of Peterborough and 8th Baron Mordaunt. Their eldest son, the third Duke, sat in the House of Lords as a Scottish representative peer from 1747 to 1752. He was succeeded by his eldest son, the fourth Duke. Known as "Cock o' the North", he was a Scottish Representative Peer from 1767 to 1784 and served as Lord-Lieutenant of Aberdeenshire and as Keeper of the Great Seal of Scotland. In 1784 he was created Baron Gordon of Huntley, in the County of Gloucester, and Earl of Norwich, in the County of Norfolk, in the Peerage of Great Britain. Gordon's great-grandfather, the first Duke, was the husband of Lady Elizabeth Howard, daughter of Lord Henry Howard, who had been created Baron Howard of Castle Rising in 1669 and Earl of Norwich in 1672. The earldom of Norwich had become extinct on the death of the fourth Earl (also the ninth Duke of Norfolk) in 1777 and was now revived in Gordon's favour. In 1819 Gordon also inherited the barony of Mordaunt through his grandmother.

His son, the fifth Duke, was a general in the Army and served as Lord-Lieutenant of Aberdeenshire and as Keeper of the Great Seal of Scotland. In 1807 he was summoned to the House of Lords through a writ of acceleration in his father's junior title of Baron Gordon of Huntley. Gordon died without legitimate issue in 1836 when the dukedom and remaining titles created in 1684 as well as the titles created in 1784 became extinct. The barony of Mordaunt fell into abeyance between his sisters. Gordon's eldest sister, Lady Charlotte Gordon, inherited the Gordon estates. Her son Charles Gordon-Lennox, 5th Duke of Richmond, assumed the additional surname of Gordon. In 1875, the dukedom of Gordon was revived when his son Charles Henry Gordon-Lennox, 6th Duke of Richmond, was made Duke of Gordon in the Peerage of the United Kingdom (see the Duke of Richmond for further history of these titles). The Duke of Gordon was succeeded in the marquessate of Huntly by his kinsman George Gordon, 5th Earl of Aboyne, who became the ninth Marquess (see the Earl of Aboyne for earlier history of this branch of the family). However, the House of Lords did not allow his claims to the lordship of Gordon of Badenoch and earldom of Enzie (although they had been created at the same time as the marquessate) while his claim to the ancient earldom of Huntly was also overlooked. Lord Huntly, who also held the subsidiary title of Lord Gordon of Strahaven and Glenlivet, had earlier been a Scottish Representative Peer from 1796 to 1807. In 1815 he had been created Baron Meldrum, of Morven in the County of Aberdeen, in the Peerage of the United Kingdom.

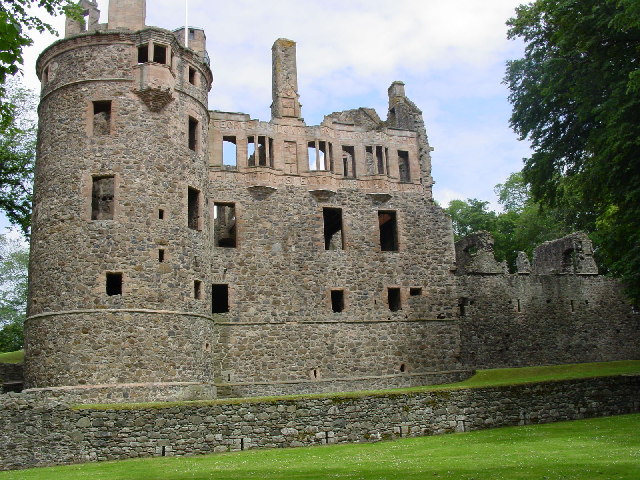
Huntly Castle, the former seat of the Marquesses of Huntly

He was succeeded by his son, the tenth Marquess. He represented East Grinstead and Huntingdonshire in the House of Commons and served as Lord-Lieutenant of Aberdeenshire. His eldest son, the eleventh Marquess, was a Liberal politician and served briefly under William Ewart Gladstone as Captain of the Honourable Corps of Gentlemen-at-Arms in 1881. He was succeeded by his great-nephew, the twelfth Marquess. He was the son of Lieutenant-Colonel (Granville Cecil) Douglas Gordon (1883–1930), son of Granville Armyn Gordon (1856–1907), sixth son of the tenth Marquess. As of 2013 the titles are held by the twelfth Marquess' son, Granville Charles Gomer Gordon, 13th Marquess of Huntly, 9th Earl of Aboyne, 9th Lord Gordon of Strathavon and Glenlivet and 5th Baron Meldrum, who succeeded in 1987. He is Chief of Clan Gordon.

Before the passing of the Peerage Act 1963, which granted all Scottish peers a seat in the House of Lords, the Marquesses of Huntly sat in the House of Lords in virtue of their junior title of Baron Meldrum, which was in the Peerage of the United Kingdom.

== Other family members ==
Several other members of the Gordon family have also gained distinction. Lord John Gordon, younger son of the first Marquess, was created Viscount Melgum in 1627. However, he perished in the Fire of Frendraught and thus, the title became extinct in 1630. Lord Adam Gordon (died 1801), younger son of the second Duke, was a general in the Army. Lord William Gordon (1744–1823), second son of the third Duke, was a vice-admiral in the Royal Navy. Lord George Gordon, third and youngest son of the third Duke, sat as Member of Parliament for Ludgershall but is best remembered as the instigator of the Gordon Riots. Charles Gordon (1798–1878), illegitimate son of the fifth Duke, was an admiral in the Royal Navy. Lord John Frederick Gordon (1799–1878), third son of the ninth Marquess, was an admiral in the Royal Navy. He married Lady Augusta Fitzclarence, daughter of King William IV by his mistress Dorothy Jordan. Laurence George Frank Gordon (1864–1943), grandson of Lieutenant-Colonel Lord Francis Arthur Gordon (1808–1857), sixth son of the ninth Marquess, was a brigadier-general in the Army. Lord Douglas Gordon, fourth son of the tenth Marquess, was Member of Parliament for Huntingdon.

The family seat is Aboyne Castle. The family also previously owned Huntly Castle, Huntly, Aberdeenshire.

== Earls of Huntly (1445) ==
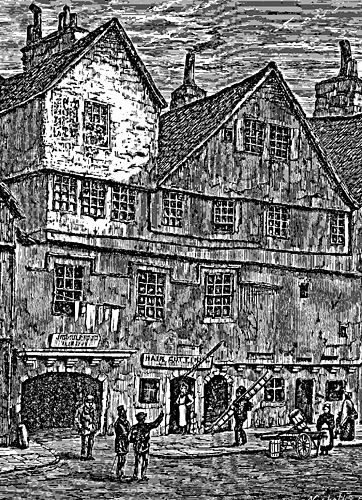
The Marquess of Huntly's House on the Canongate - now part of Huntly House Museum

- Alexander Gordon, 1st Earl of Huntly (d. 1470)
- George Gordon, 2nd Earl of Huntly (d. 1501)
- Alexander Gordon, 3rd Earl of Huntly (d. 1524)
- George Gordon, 4th Earl of Huntly (1514–1562) (forfeit 1563)
- George Gordon, 5th Earl of Huntly (died 1576) (restored 1565)
- George Gordon, 6th Earl of Huntly (1562–1636) (created Marquess of Huntly, Lord Gordon of Badenoch, and Earl of Enzie in 1599)

== Marquesses of Huntly (1599) ==
- George Gordon, 1st Marquess of Huntly, 6th Earl of Huntly (1562–1636)
- George Gordon, 2nd Marquess of Huntly, 7th Earl of Huntly (1592–1649)
- Lewis Gordon, 3rd Marquess of Huntly, 8th Earl of Huntly (c. 1626–1653)
- George Gordon, 4th Marquess of Huntly, 9th Earl of Huntly (1649–1716) (created Duke of Gordon in 1684)

== Dukes of Gordon (1684) ==
- George Gordon, 1st Duke of Gordon, 4th Marquess of Huntly, 9th Earl of Huntly (1649–1716)
- Alexander Gordon, 2nd Duke of Gordon, 5th Marquess of Huntly, 10th Earl of Huntly (d. 1728)
- Cosmo George Gordon, 3rd Duke of Gordon, 6th Marquess of Huntly, 11th Earl of Huntly (c. 1720–1752)
- Alexander Gordon, 4th Duke of Gordon, 7th Marquess of Huntly, 12th Earl of Huntly (1743–1827)
- George Duncan Gordon, 5th Duke of Gordon, 8th Marquess of Huntly, 13th Earl of Huntly (1770–1836)

== Marquesses of Huntly (1599; Reverted) ==
- George Gordon, 9th Marquess of Huntly, 14th Earl of Huntly, 5th Earl of Aboyne, 1st Baron Meldrum (1761–1853) (Created Baron Meldrum in 1815)
- Charles Gordon, 10th Marquess of Huntly, 15th Earl of Huntly, 6th Earl of Aboyne, 2nd Baron Meldrum (1792–1863)
- Charles Gordon, 11th Marquess of Huntly, 16th Earl of Huntly, 7th Earl of Aboyne, 3rd Baron Meldrum (1847–1937)
- Douglas Charles Lindsey Gordon, 12th Marquess of Huntly, 17th Earl of Huntly, 8th Earl of Aboyne, 4th Baron Meldrum (1908–1987)
- Granville Charles Gomer Gordon, 13th Marquess of Huntly, 18th Earl of Huntly, 9th Earl of Aboyne, 5th Baron Meldrum (b. 1944)

The heir apparent is the present holder's only son, Alastair Gordon, Earl of Aboyne (born 1973).

The heir apparent's heir apparent is his son Cosmo Alistair Gordon, Lord Strathavon (b. 2009).

== Succession and family tree ==
Line of succession (simplified)
- Charles Gordon, 10th Marquess of Huntly (1792–1863)
  - Charles Gordon, 11th Marquess of Huntly (1847–1937)
  - Lord Granville Armyne Gordon (1856–1907)
    - Granville Cecil Douglas Gordon (1883–1930)
      - Douglas Gordon, 12th Marquess of Huntly (1908–1987)
        - Granville Gordon, 13th Marquess of Huntly (born 1944)
          - (1). Alastair Gordon, Earl of Aboyne (born 1973)
            - (2). Cosmo Gordon, Lord Strathavon and Glenlivet (born 2009)
      - Lord Adam Granville Gordon (1909–1984)
        - Adam Alexander Gordon (1948–2011)
          - (3). Alexander Charles Adam Gordon (born 1989)
        - (4). Douglas Herriot Gordon (born 1951)
          - (5). James Adam Anthony Gordon (born 1991)
      - Lord Roderic Amyne Gordon (1914–1996)
        - (6). David Esme Douglas Gordon (born 1937)
        - (7). Angus Lindsay Eustace Gordon (born 1942)
      - Lord Douglas Claude Alexander Gordon (1916–1994)
        - (8). Andrew Granville Douglas Gordon (born 1942)
          - (9). Andrew David Gervais Gordon (born 1963)
          - (10). James Bruce Douglas Gordon (born 1965)
          - (11). Glen Gordon (born 1984)
        - (12). Douglas Geordie Alexander Gordon (born 1947)
          - (13). Thomas Peter Douglas Gordon (born 1979)
            - (14). Jake Harry George Gordon (born 2012)
          - (15). James Alexander Douglas Gordon (born 1984)

Lennox, Richmond, and Gordon family tree including peerages of Aboyne, Aubigny, Enzie, Gordon, Huntly, Inverness, Kinrara, Lennox, March, Meldrum, Richmond, Settrington, and Strathaven, Balmore, Auchindoun, Garthie and Kincardine

Henry of Scotland; 1114–1152; Earl of Northumbria, Earl of Huntingdon
Mormaer of Lennox (1st creation), 12th century
Malcolm IV; 1141–1165; Earl of Huntingdon, later King of Scotland	William I c. 1142–1214; Earl of Huntingdon, later King of Scotland	David; 1152–1219; Mormaer of Lennox, Earl of Huntingdon	Ailín I d. c. 1200 possibly Mormaer of Lennox
Isobel of Huntingdon; 1199–1251	Ailín II d. 1217; Mormaer of Lennox
Robert V de Brus c. 1210–1295	Maol Domhnaich (Maldoven) d. 1250; Mormaer of Lennox	?	Gille Chriosd	Alexander Stewart c. 1214–1283; High Steward of Scotland
Robert VI de Brus; 1243–1304	Maol Choluim (Malcolm) I d. 1303; Mormaer of Lennox	Amlaibh	Clan MacFarlane	John Stewart d. 1298
Robert I 1274–1329; King of Scotland	Maol Choluim (Malcolm) II d. 1333; Mormaer of Lennox	?
Marjorie Bruce; 1296–1316	Domhnall (Donald) d. 1365; Mormaer of Lennox	?	Alan Stewart of Dreghorn d. 1333
Edward III; 1312–1377; King of England	Robert II; 1316–1390; King of Scotland	Margaret; Countess of Lennox (?)	Walter of Faslane (also Baltar mac Amlaimh) de facto Mormaer of Lennox	Alexander Stewart of Darnley d. 1374
Resigned, 1385
Earl of Richmond (5th creation), 1342
John of Gaunt; 1340–1399; Duke of Lancaster; Earl of Richmond	Adam de Gordon d. 1402; Lord of Gordon	Robert III; 1337–1406; King of Scots	Robert Stewart c. 1340–1420; Duke of Albany	Donnchadh; Mormaer of Lennox r. 1385–1425	Alexander Stewart of Darnley d. 1404
Earldom of Richmond (5th creation) surrendered, 1372
Lord of (Seigneur d')Aubigny, 1422
Henry IV; 1367–1413; King of England	John Beaufort; 1373–1410; Earl of Somerset	Elizabeth Gordon d. 1439 m. Alexander Seton d. 1440 or 1441; Lord Gordon	Murdoch Stewart; 1362-1425; Duke of Albany	Isabella d. 1458; Countess of Lennox	Elizabeth	John Stewart of Darnley c. 1380–1429; 1st Comte d'Évreux, Seigneur de Concressault, 1st Lord of Aubigny
Earldom of Lennox (1st creation) extinct, 1458
Earl of Richmond (6th creation), 1414	Earl of Huntly, 1445
John of Lancaster; 1389–1435; Duke of Bedford, Earl of Richmond	John Beaufort c. 1403–1444; Duke of Somerset	Alexander Seton (Gordon) d. 1470; 1st Earl of Huntly	James I 1394–1437; King of Scots	Joan Beaufort c. 1404–1445	James Stewart c. 1399 – c. 1451; Black Knight of Lorn	Alan Stewart of Darnley after 1406 – 1439	John Stewart d. 1482; 2nd Lord of Aubigny
Earldom of Richmond (6th creation) extinct, 1435
Earl of Richmond (7th creation), 1452	Earl of Lennox (2nd creation), 1488
Edmund Tudor; 1430–1456; 1st Earl of Richmond	Margaret Beaufort; 1443–1509	George Gordon d. 1501; 2nd Earl of Huntly	Annabella of Scotland c. 1433–1509	James II; 1430–1460; King of Scots	John Stewart a. 1430–1495; 1st Earl of Lennox	John Stewart c. 1440–1512; Earl of Atholl	Bernard Stewart c. 1452 – 1508; 3rd Lord of Aubigny
Henry Tudor; 1457–1509; 2nd Earl of Richmond, Later King Henry VII	James III; 1451–1488; King of Scots	Mary Stewart; 1453–1488
Earldom of Richmond (7th creation) merged into the Crown, 1509
Elizabeth Stewart d. after 1531	Matthew Stewart; 1460–1513; 2nd Earl of Lennox	Robert Stewart c. 1470–1544; 4th Lord of Aubigny	Anne
Henry VIII; 1491–1547; King of England	Alexander Gordon d. 1524; 3rd Earl of Huntly	James IV; 1473–1513; King of Scots	Margaret Tudor; 1489–1541	Archibald Douglas; 1489–1557; Earl of Angus	John Stewart c. 1490–1526; 3rd Earl of Lennox	Elizabeth Stewart
John Gordon d. 1517; Lord Gordon	Margaret Stewart b. 1498)
Earl of Lennox (4th creation), 1578
Duke of Richmond and Somerset, 1525	Earl of March (3rd Scottish creation), 1581
Henry Fitzroy; 1519–1536; Duke of Richmond and Somerset	George Gordon; 1514–1562; 4th Earl of Huntly	James V 1512–1542; King of Scots	Margaret Douglas; 1515–1578	Matthew Stewart; 1516–1571; 4th Earl of Lennox	Robert Stewart c. 1522–1586; Earl of Lennox, Earl of March	John Stewart d. 1567; 5th Lord of Aubigny
Dukedom of Richmond and Somerset extinct, 1536	Earldom of Lennox (2nd creation) merged with crown, 1571	Earldom of Lennox (4th creation) "exchanged" for the Earldom of March, 1580
Earl of Lennox (3rd creation), c. 1571	Earl of Lennox (5th creation), 1580; Duke of Lennox (1st creation), 1581
George Gordon d. 1576; 5th Earl of Huntly	Mary; 1542–1587; Queen of Scots	Henry Stuart; 1545–1567; Lord Darnley	Charles Stuart; 1557–1576; Earl of Lennox	Esmé Stewart; 1542–1583; Duke of Lennox, etc., 6th Lord of Aubigny
Earldom of Lennox (3rd creation) extinct, 1576
Earl of Richmond, Baron Settrington (1st creation), 1613
Marquess of Huntly, Earl of Enzie, and Lord Gordon of Badenoch, 1599	Duke of Richmond (1st creation), 1623	Earl of March (3rd English creation), 1619
George Gordon; 1562–1636; 1st Marquess of Huntly, etc., 6th Earl of Huntly	James VI and I 1566–1625; King of England and Scotland	Ludovic Stewart; 1574–1623; 2nd Duke of Lennox, 1st Duke of Richmond, etc.	Esmé Stewart; 1579–1624; 3rd Duke of Lennox, 2nd Earl of Richmond, 3rd Baron Settrington, 1st Earl of March, 7th Lord of Aubigny
Dukedom of Richmond, Earldom of Richmond and Settrington Barony extinct, 1623
Viscount Aboyne, 1632	Duke of Richmond (2nd creation), 1641
George Gordon c. 1592–1649; 2nd Marquess of Huntly, etc., 7th Earl of Huntly, 1st Viscount Aboyne	Charles I 1600–1649; King of England and Scotland	James Stewart; 1612–1655; 4th Duke of Lennox, 1st Duke of Richmond, 2nd Earl of March	Henry Stewart; 1616–1632; 8th Lord of Aubigny	George Stewart; 1618–1642; 9th Lord of Aubigny	Ludovic Stewart; 1619–1665; 10th Lord of Aubigny
Duke of Aubigny (France), 1684	Earl of Aboyne and Lord Gordon of Strathaven and Glenlivet, 1660
James Gordon c. 1620–1649; 2nd Viscount Aboyne	Lewis Gordon c. 1626–1653; 3rd Marquess of Huntly, etc., 8th Earl of Huntly	Charles II; 1630–1685; King of England and Scotland	Louise de Kérousaille; 1649–1734; Duchess of Portsmouth, Duchess of Aubigny	Charles Gordon c. 1638–1681; 1st Earl of Aboyne, etc.	Esmé Stewart; 1649–1660; 5th Duke of Lennox, 2nd Duke of Richmond, 3rd Earl of March	Charles Stewart; 1639–1672; 6th Duke of Lennox, 3rd Duke of Richmond, 4th Earl of March, 11th Lord of Aubigny
Aboyne Viscountcy extinct, 1649	Dukedoms of Lennox and Richmond, earl of March (3rd English creation), and lordship of Aubigny extinct, 1672
Duke of Gordon (1st creation), Viscount of Inverness, and Lord Strathaven, Balmore, Auchindoun, Garthie and Kincardine, 1684	Duke of Richmond (3rd creation), Duke of Lennox (2nd creation), Earl of March (4th English creation), Earl of Darnley, Baron Settrington of Settrington in the County of York (2nd creation), and Lord Torbolton, 1675
George Gordon; 1st Duke of Gordon, etc., 4th Marquess of Huntly, etc., 9th Earl of Huntly	Charles Lennox; 1672–1723; 1st Duke of Richmond and Duke of Lennox, etc., Duke of Aubigny	Charles Gordon c. 1670–1702; 2nd Earl of Aboyne, etc.
Alexander Gordon; 1720–1752; 2nd Duke of Gordon, etc., 5th Marquess of Huntly, etc., 10th Earl of Huntly	Charles Lennox; 1701–1750; 2nd Duke of Richmond and Duke of Lennox, etc., Duke of Aubigny	John Gordon d. 1732; 3rd Earl of Aboyne, etc.
Cosmo George Gordon; 1720–1752; 3rd Duke of Gordon, etc., 6th Marquess of Huntly, etc., 11th Earl of Huntly	Charles Lennox; 1735–1806; 3rd Duke of Richmond and Duke of Lennox, etc., Duke of Aubigny	George Lennox; 1737–1805	Charles Gordon c. 1726–1794; 4th Earl of Aboyne, etc.
Baron Gordon of Huntly, 1784
Alexander Gordon; 1743–1827; 4th Duke of Gordon, etc., 7th Marquess of Huntly, etc., 12th Earl of Huntly, 1st Earl of Norwich, 1st Baron Gordon of Huntly
Baron Meldrum of Morven in the County of Aberdeen, 1815; Marquess of Huntly reverted, 1838
George Duncan Gordon; 1770–1836; 5th Duke of Gordon, etc., 8th Marquess of Huntly, etc., 13th Earl of Huntly, 5th Earl of Enzie, 2nd Earl of Norwich, 2nd Baron Gordon of Huntly	Lady Charlotte Gordon; 1768–1842	Charles Lennox; 1764–1819; 4th Duke of Richmond and Duke of Lennox, etc., Duke of Aubigny, etc.	George Gordon; 1761–1853; 9th Marquess of Huntly, 14th Earl of Huntly, 5th Earl of Aboyne, etc., 1st Baron Meldrum
Dukedom of Gordon (1st creation), earldom of Norwich (4th creation), earldom of Enzie, viscountcy of Inverness, lordship Strathaven, Balmore, Auchindoun, Garthie and Kincardine, barony Gordon of Huntly extinct, 1836; Marquessate and earldom of Huntly continued with George Gordon, 5th Earl of Aboyne
Charles Gordon-Lennox; 1791–1860; 5th Duke of Richmond and Duke of Lennox, etc., Duke of Aubigny, etc.	Charles Gordon; 1792–1863; 10th Marquess of Huntly, 15th Earl of Huntly, 6th Earl of Aboyne, etc., 2nd Baron Meldrum
Duke of Gordon (2nd creation) and Earl of Kinrara, 1876
Charles Henry Gordon-Lennox; 1818–1903; 6th Duke of Richmond and Duke of Lennox, 1st Duke of Gordon, etc., 6th Duke of Aubigny, etc.
Charles Henry Gordon-Lennox; 1845–1928; 7th Duke of Richmond and Duke of Lennox, 2nd Duke of Gordon, etc., 7th Duke of Aubigny, etc.	Charles Gordon; 1847–1937; 11th Marquess of Huntly, 16th Earl of Huntly, 7th Earl of Aboyne, etc., 3rd Baron Meldrum	Granville Armyne Gordon; 1856–1907
Charles Henry Gordon-Lennox; 1870–1935; 8th Duke of Richmond and Duke of Lennox, 8th Duke of Aubigny, etc. 3rd Duke of Gordon, etc.	Granville Cecil Douglas Gordon; 1883–1930
Charles Henry Gordon-Lennox; 1899–1919; Lord Settrington	Frederick Charles Gordon-Lennox; 1904–1989; 9th Duke of Richmond and Duke of Lennox, 9th Duke of Aubigny, etc., 4th Duke of Gordon, etc.	Douglas Charles Lindsey Gordon; 1908–1987; 12th Marquess of Huntly, 18th Earl of Huntly, 8th Earl of Aboyne, etc., 4th Baron Meldrum
Charles Henry Gordon-Lennox; 1929–2017; 10th Duke of Richmond and Duke of Lennox, 10th Duke of Aubigny, etc., 5th Duke of Gordon, etc.
Charles Gordon-Lennox b. 1955; 11th Duke of Richmond and Duke of Lennox, 11th Duke of Aubigny, etc., 6th Duke of Gordon, etc.	Granville Charles Gomer Gordon b. 1944; 13th Marquess of Huntly, 18th Earl of Huntly, 9th Earl of Aboyne, etc., 5th Baron Meldrum
Charles Henry Gordon-Lennox b. 1994 styled Earl of March and Kinrara	Alastair Gordon b. 1973 styled Earl of Aboyne
Heir apparent to the dukedoms of Richmond, Lennox, Aubigny, and Gordon	Heir apparent to the marquessate of Huntly

== See also ==
- Clan Gordon
- Earl of Aboyne
- Viscount Aboyne
- Viscount Melgum
- Baron Mordaunt
- Duke of Gordon
- Seton Baronets
- Duke of Richmond
- Earl of Sutherland
- Meldrum
- Morven, Aberdeenshire
- Marquess of Aberdeen and Temair
