= Alexander Lindsay, 4th Earl of Crawford =

Scottish nobleman

Alexander Lindsay, 4th Earl of Crawford (1423–1453) was a late medieval Scottish nobleman, and a magnate of the north-east of that country.

== Life ==
Alexander Lindsay was the son of David Lindsay, 3rd Earl of Crawford and Marjory Ogilvie, the daughter of Sir Alexander Ogilvie of Auchterhouse.

Known as the Tiger Earl or Earl Beardie, Crawford was one of the most powerful of the Scottish nobles. For some time he was in arms against King James II as part of the Douglas rebellion. In February 1452, William Douglas, 8th Earl of Douglas was personally killed at Stirling Castle by James II for refusing to dissolve his league with Alexander. The Tiger Earl was defeated at the Battle of Brechin on 18 May, and he submitted to James II in 1452.

J. B. Burke imagined the colourful scene of the earl's submission, thus:

The decree of forfeiture, both as to life and lands, which had been passed before, was now renewed and, after having gallantly struggled for a long time against all odds—even after the total defeat and submission of his ally Douglas—he found himself compelled, for the sake of his house and followers, to sue for mercy. In this last extremity it is that all the better parts of his character stand out in full relief; there is neither fear, nor meanness, nor self seeking in his frank and manly prayers for mercy: but, mingled with the courage that we might reasonably look for, is a tenderness for others that we certainly did not expect to find in such a character. For himself, as he boldly tells the king, he was willing to underlie any fate, "either to be hangit [hanged], to be riven with wild beasts, to be drowned, or cassen [cast] over ane craig;” it was not even the sufferings of his dear wife, nor the weeping of his bairns [children], nor the lamentable sobbings of his friends that moved him, so much "as the decay and falling of our House, and lamentable chance and fortune of the noblemen of Angus, with the rest of my adherents, whose lives, lands, and guids [goods] stands in danger for my cause and surname of Lindsay. Have compassion on the noblemen, men that concordit to my faction, that they, at the least, be not spoilzied (spoiled) of their lives and heritages for my offence".

The king granted Lindsay clemency, but when he had been angry with the earl, he had sworn he would make the highest stone on Finavon Castle become the lowest. Therefore, to keep his oath while yet remaining true to his grant of clemency, the king climbed to the top of the castle and threw one of the loose stones on the battlements down to the ground below. J. B. Burke recorded that two hundred years later it could still be seen where it had fallen "secured to the spot with a strong chain of iron".

Legend has it that he is the infamous "Earl Beardie" featured in one of the myths of Glamis Castle.

== Marriage and issue ==
Alexander, Earl of Crawford married Margaret Dunbar, daughter of Sir David Dunbar of Cockburn, himself a son of George I, Earl of March, and had issue:

- Lady Elizabeth Lindsay (died 1509), married to John Drummond, 1st Lord Drummond
- David Lindsay, 1st Duke of Montrose (1440–1495)
- Alexander Lindsay, 7th Earl of Crawford (died 1517), father of David Lindsay, 8th Earl of Crawford

Peerage of Scotland
Preceded by David Lindsay	Earl of Crawford; 1446–1453	Succeeded by David Lindsay
