= Gordon, Scottish Borders =

Village in Scottish Borders, Scotland

Coordinates: 55°40′49″N 2°33′44″W

Gordon
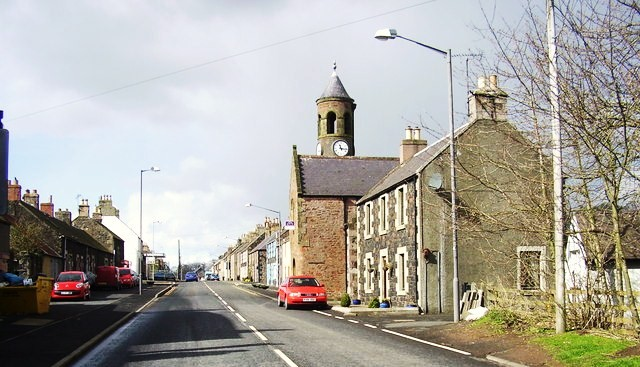
- Gordon, looking west

- Location within the Scottish Borders
- OS grid reference: NT647431
- Council area: Scottish Borders
- Lieutenancy area: Berwickshire
- Country: Scotland
- Sovereign state: United Kingdom
- Post town: GORDON
- Postcode district: TD3
- Dialling code: 01573
- Police: Scotland
- Fire: Scottish
- Ambulance: Scottish
- UK Parliament: Berwickshire, Roxburgh and Selkirk
- Scottish Parliament: Ettrick, Roxburgh and Berwickshire

Gordon is a village in the Scottish Borders area of Scotland, within the historic county of Berwickshire. The village sits on the crossroads of the A6105 Earlston to Berwick on Tweed road and the A6089 Edinburgh to Kelso road. It is 6 miles (10 km) east of Earlston and 4 miles (6 km) west of Greenlaw.

Gordon was served by trains on the Berwickshire Railway from 1863 to 1948.

== Origins ==
The first Gordon on record is Richard of Gordon, previously of Swinton, said to have been the grandson of a famous knight who slew some monstrous animal in the Merse during the time of King Malcolm III of Scotland. This Richard was Lord of the Barony of Gordon in the Merse. The name is said to derive from Brittonic, meaning great fort. The de Gordons held the lairdship of Gordon for over two centuries and were thought to have built a castle at the former hamlet of Huntly just to the north; they still held lands up to the 18th century. The Gordon family are the ancestors of the Dukes of Richmond and Gordon and of the Marquis of Huntly.

== Church ==
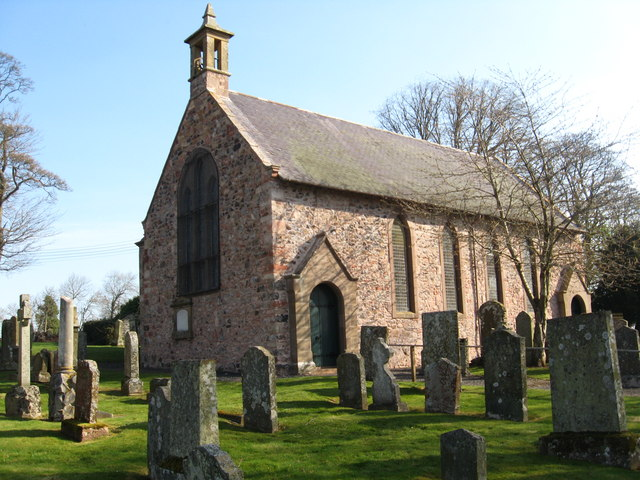
St. Michael's Parish Church

In 1171, the chapel at Gordon, dedicated to St. Michael, was transferred by the monks of Coldingham to their counterparts at Kelso in return for the church at Earlston. The present church was built in 1763 and is a part of the Church of Scotland. A Free Church of Scotland church was opened in 1843 but that is now used as a private home.

== Greenknowe Tower ==
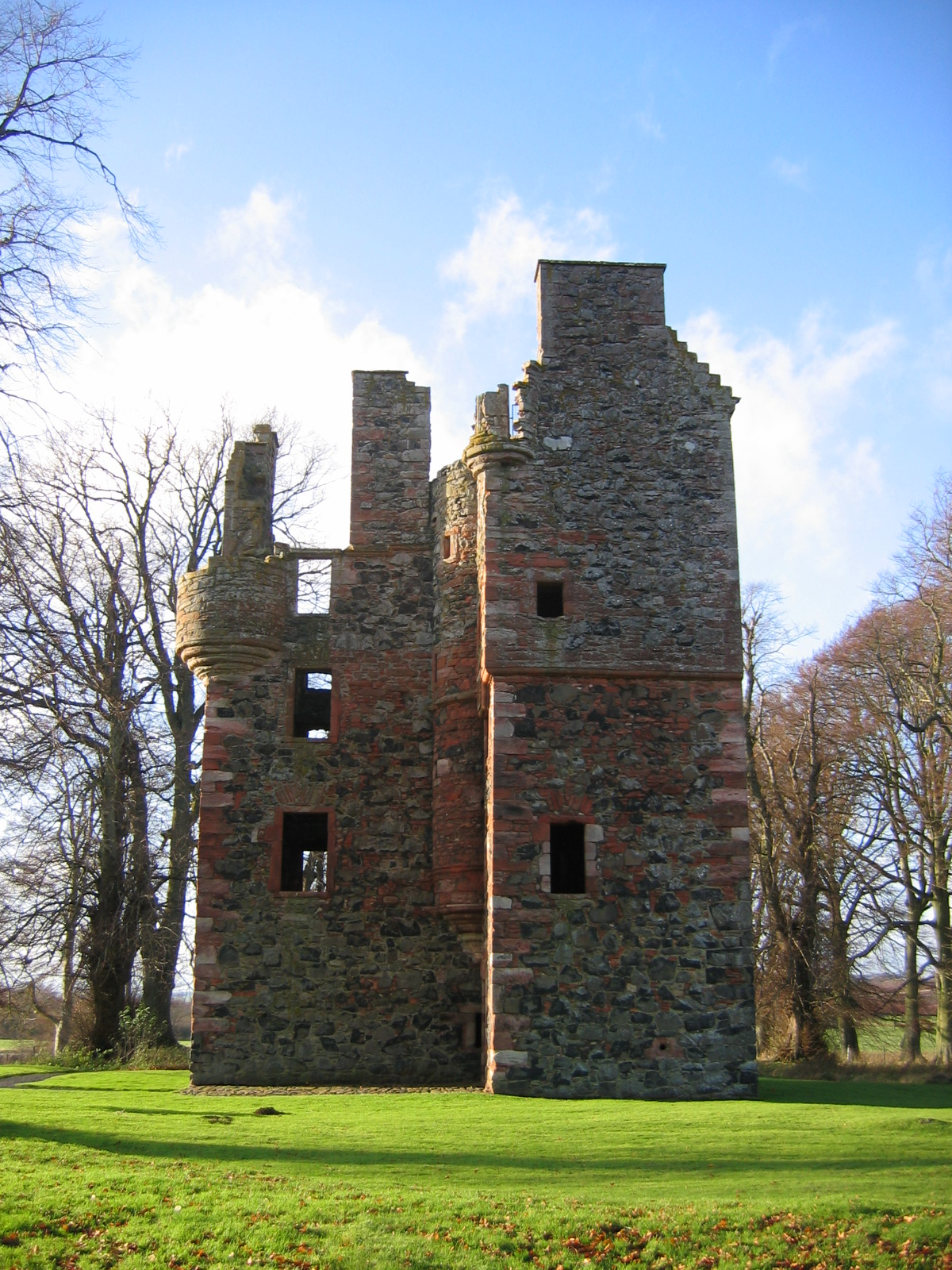
Greenknowe Tower

In 1408, Alexander Seton married Elizabeth Gordon, heiress of the Gordon family, and they were granted lands at Greenknowe, just to the west of the village. A descendant of the family, James Seton of Touch, married Janet Edmonstone and it was they who built the tower in 1581. Their initials IS/IE (the 'I' is Latin for 'J') are carved above the entrance. Later owners of the tower were Walter Pringle of Stichill, the Covenanter and the Dalrymple family. The tower is now in the care of Historic Environment Scotland.

== Today ==
Modern Gordon has a Church of Scotland kirk, a nursery, a primary school, a lawn bowling club, a football pitch, a community woodland, children's play park, village hall, a public house/restaurant and village shop/takeaway. The main street has not changed for many years though there has been much housing development at the north end of the village off Station Road.

== See also ==
- List of places in the Scottish Borders
- List of places in Scotland
