= Adam de Gordon (died 1402) =

Scottish baron

- Lord of Gordon
- Died: 14 September 1402, killed at the Battle of Homildon Hill
- Family: Clan Gordon
- Spouse: Elizabeth Keith

Sir Adam de Gordon, Lord of Gordon (died 1402) was a 14th-century Scottish baron.

== Life ==
He was son and heir of Sir John de Gordon, knight, Lord of Gordon, and his wife Elizabeth Cruickshanks. When George I, Earl of March defected to England Sir Adam Gordon was given the superiority of his lands of Gordon and Fogo, raising him to the baronage, and at the same time made warden of the east marches.

Gordon was also in the division of the Scottish army which, under the young James Douglas, Earl of Douglas, invaded Northumberland in 1388, ending with the battle of Otterburn on 19 August, where Douglas with several other Scottish noblemen were killed. On 18 June the same year King Robert II of Scotland granted him a charter confirming to him and to his heirs the lands of Strathbogie given to Sir Adam de Gordon by King Robert de Bruce.

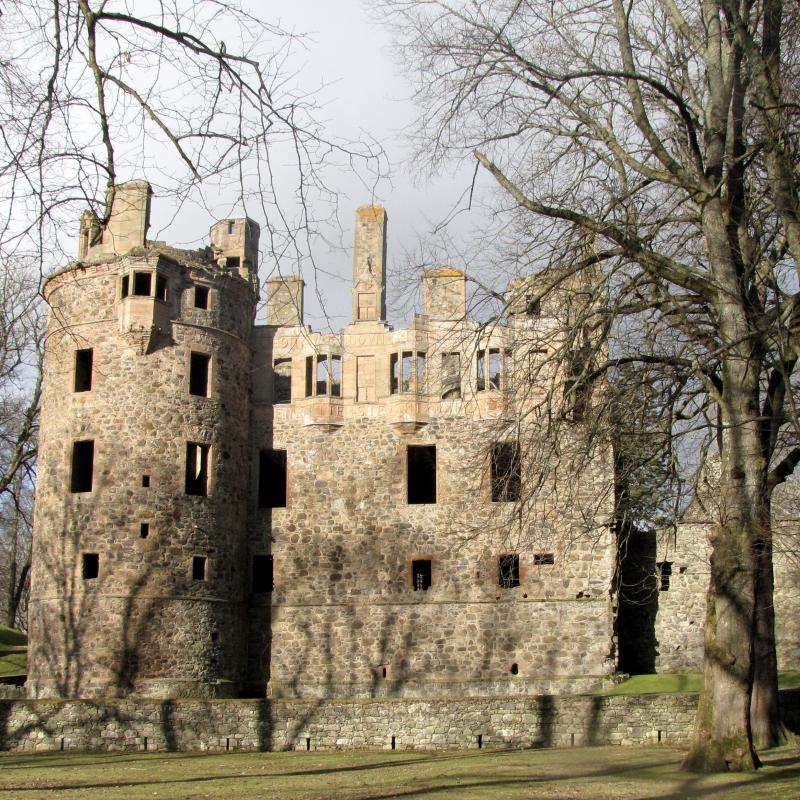
Huntly Castle, originally called Strathbogie, erected by Sir Adam de Gordon

Gordon was included in the grand army with which, in 1402, Archibald Douglas the Earl of Douglas invaded England. Though watched by Henry Percy, the Earl of Northumberland and his son Hotspur, the Scots penetrated without hindrance to the gates of Newcastle. They had reached Wooler on their homeward journey when the approach of an English army forced them to take up a position upon Homildon Hill. They became impatient under the discharge of the English arrows. Sir John de Swynton, with whom Gordon had been at feud, called impatiently for a charge. Gordon fell on his knees, begged Swynton's forgiveness, and was knighted on the spot by his reconciled enemy. They charged the English at the head of a hundred horsemen, and inflicted much slaughter, but were overpowered and slain.

== Family ==
About 1380 Sir Adam Gordon married Elizabeth Keith, daughter of William Keith, Marischal of Scotland and his wife Margaret Fraser. Together they had:

- John Gordon, succeeded his father but died before 7 March 1407–8 without issue.
- Elizabeth Gordon, married Alexander Seton, son of Sir William Seton of Seton; succeeding her brother John to their father's honors.

== See also ==
This article incorporates text from a publication now in the public domain: "Gordon, Adam de (d.1402)". Dictionary of National Biography. London: Smith, Elder & Co. 1885–1900.
