= Battle of Brechin =

Battle of the Royal–Black Douglas civil war

- Part of Royal–Black Douglas civil war
- Coats of arms of the Earl of Huntly (left) and Earl of Crawford (right)
Date	18 May 1452
Location	near Brechin, Angus, Scotland
Result	Royalist Victory

Belligerents
Clan Gordon (Royalists)	Clan Lindsay (Rebels)

Commanders and leaders
Earl of Huntly	Earl of Crawford

The Battle of Brechin was fought on 18 May 1452 during the reign of James II of Scotland, about two and a half miles north north east of Brechin. It has been regarded as part of the civil war during his reign between the king and an alliance of powerful noble families led by the Black Douglases, which as the king won was significant in the development of a relatively strong centralised monarchy in Scotland during the Late Middle Ages.

A royalist army formed by the Clan Gordon and Clan Ogilvy, led by Alexander Gordon, 1st Earl of Huntly, defeated the rebel Alexander Lindsay, 4th Earl of Crawford, a leading ally of the Black Douglases who was known as "The Tiger". Shortly after Crawford submitted to the king, leaving the Black Douglases more isolated, to be defeated at the Battle of Arkinholm in 1455.

However, it has been argued that it was a localised conflict in the north-east of Scotland, of only limited relevance to wider conflicts in Scotland as a whole in spite of the fact that the Gordons fought under the royal banner.
