= Lindsay (surname) =

Lindsay is a surname, and may refer to:

== A ==
- Adam Lindsay, American 18th-century theatrical manager
- Albert Lindsay (1881–1961), English footballer
- Alec Lindsay (born 1948), English footballer
- Alex Lindsay (footballer) (1896–1971), Scottish footballer
- Alex Lindsay (violinist) (1919–1974), New Zealand violinist, conductor and orchestra leader
- Alex Lindsay (podcaster) (born 1970), founder of the Pixel Corps
- Alexander Lindsay of Evelick (bishop) (c.1561–1639), Church of Scotland minister
- Alexander Lindsay of Glenesk (died 1381), Scottish knight banneret and crusader
- Alexander Lindsay Jr. (1871–1926), American judge
- Alexander Lindsay (cricketer) (1883—1941), Scottish merchant and cricketer
- Alexander Lindsay (East India Company officer) (1785–1872), British general
- Alexander Lindsay (rower) (born 1936), British rower
- Alexander Lindsay, 1st Earl of Balcarres (1618–1659), Scottish nobleman and courtier
- Alexander Lindsay, 4th Earl of Balcarres (died 1736), Scottish representative peer
- Alexander Lindsay, 6th Earl of Balcarres (1752–1825), Scottish general
- Alexander Lindsay, 2nd Earl of Crawford (c.1387–1438/9), Scottish magnate
- Alexander Lindsay, 4th Earl of Crawford, (1423–1453), Scottish nobleman and magnate
- Alexander Lindsay, 25th Earl of Crawford (1812–1880), Scottish peer, art historian and collector
- Alexander Lindsay, 1st Lord Spynie (died 1607), Scottish nobleman
- Alexander Lindsay, 2nd Lord Spynie (died 1646), Scottish nobleman and soldier of fortune
- Alexander Lindsay of Barnweill (before 1279 – c. 1309), son of David de Lindsay of the Byres
- Alexander Lindsay of Glenesk (before 1350–1381), knight renowned in Wars of Scottish Independence
- Alexander Lindsay, 2nd Earl of Crawford (1387–1438), son of David Lindsay, 1st Earl of Crawford and Elizabeth Stewart, daughter of Robert II
- Alexander Lindsay, 4th Earl of Crawford (before 1425–1453), the Tiger Earl; participated in Douglas rebellion against James II
- Alexander Lindsay, 1st Lord Spynie (c.1564–1607), son of David Lindsay, 10th Earl of Crawford; Privy Counsellor
- Alexander Lindsay, 2nd Lord Spynie (ca. 1597–1646), son of 1st Lord Spynie; Scottish soldier
- Alexander McLeod-Lindsay (1934–2009), Australian exonerated of attempting to murder his wife
- Allan Lindsay (1926–2014), British athlete
- Alvin Francis Lindsay (1882–1957), American politician, Missouri state representative
- Alwyn Lindsay (1923–2001), Australian rules footballer
- Amy Lindsay (born 1966), American film actress and pornographic film performer
- Andrea Lindsay, Canadian pop singer-songwriter
- Andrew Lindsay (born 1977), British rower and business executive
- Andrew Lindsay (archer) (born 91976), New Zealand archer
- Andrew Lindsay (rugby union) (1885–1970), Scotland rugby union footballer
- Andrew Lindsay (swimmer) (born 1979), British paralympic swimmer
- Anna Lindsay (activist) (1845–1903), Scottish women's activist
- Anna Lindsey (rancher) (1900–1995), Hawaiian rancher
- Anna Robertson Brown Lindsay (1864–1948), American theologian
- Annabelle Lindsay (born 1998), Australian wheelchair basketball player
- Anthony Lindsay, 30th Earl of Crawford (born 1958), Scottish peer and Chief of Clan Lindsay
- Sir Anthony Lindsay-Hogg, 2nd Baronet (1908–1968), British Royal Air Force officer
- Archie Lindsay (1882–?), Scottish footballer
- Arthur Fydell Lindsay (1816–1895), South Australian surveyor and politician
- Arto Lindsay (born 1953), American musician and composer
- Arturo Lindsay (born 1946), Panamanian artist and art historian

== B ==
- Beatrice Lindsay (1858–1917), English zoologist and writer
- Beth Lindsay, Scottish curler
- Bert Lindsay (1881–1960), Canadian ice hockey goaltender
- Betty Lindsay (1897–1953), American civil engineer
- Beverly Lindsay (fl. 2026), British travel agent and public figure
- Bill Lindsay (born 1971), American ice hockey player
- Bill Lindsay (pitcher) (1891–1914), American baseball pitcher
- Bill Lindsay (rugby union) (1879—1965), New Zealand rugby union footballer
- Bill Lindsay (third baseman) (1881–1963), American baseball player
- Bill Lindsay-Smith (1921–2012), British field hockey player
- Billy Lindsay (1872–1933), English footballer
- Brendon Lindsay (born 1977), Scotland international rugby league footballer
- Brian Lindsay (born 1937), Australian politician
- Bruce Lindsay (footballer) (born 1961), Australian rules footballer
- Bruce Lindsay (broadcaster) (born 1950), American broadcaster
- Bruce G. Lindsay (1947–2015), American statistician

== C ==
- Cameron Lindsay (footballer) (born 1992), New Zealand footballer
- Cameron Lindsay (rugby union) (born 1991), South African rugby union footballer
- Chantelle Lindsay (born 1994), English wildlife conservationist and television presenter
- Charles Lindsay (artist) (born 1961), American photographer and artist
- Charles Lindsay (Australian politician) (1812–1884), Scottish pastoralist and South Australian politician
- Charles Lindsay (bishop) (1760–1846), Church of Ireland Bishop of Killaloe and Kilfenora
- Charles Lindsay (British politician) (1816–1889), British soldier, courtier and politician
- Charles Lindsay (priest) (1790–1855), Anglican priest in Ireland
- Charles William Lindsay (1856–1939), Canadian businessman and philanthropist
- Chike Lindsay (born 1983), American kickboxer
- Chris Lindsay (1878–1941), American baseball player
- Christian Lindsay (fl.1580–1620), Scottish poet
- Christine Lindsay-Abaire, American stage and film actress
- Clarence Lindsay (1898–1944), American baseball player
- Colin Lindsay, 3rd Earl of Balcarres (1652–1722), Scottish nobleman and politician
- Coutts Lindsay (1824–1913), British watercolourist and baronet
- Cressida Lindsay (1930–2010), English novelist

== D ==
- Daniel Lindsay, American documentary filmmaker
- Darnell Lindsay (1987–2012), American basketball player
- Darran Lindsay (1971–2006), Northern Irish motorcycle road racer
- Daryl Lindsay (1889–1976), Australian artist, brother of Norman Lindsay
- David de Lindsay (died 1214), Norman-Scottish baron
- David Lindsay (d. 1667) (c.1583–1667), Church of Scotland minister
- David de Lindsay of the Byres (died 1279), Scottish knight and crusader
- David Lindsay of Crawford (died 1355), Scottish nobleman, son of Alexander Lindsay of Barnweill
- David Lindsay of Edzell, Lord Edzell (c.1551–1610), Scottish judge, son of David Lindsay, 9th Earl of Crawford
- David Lindsay (bishop of Ross) (1531–1613), Scottish minister
- David Lindsay (bishop of Edinburgh) (1575–1641), also Bishop of Brechin
- David Lindsay (English footballer) (born 1966), English football player
- David Lindsay (explorer) (1856–1922), leader of 1891 Elder expedition to Central Australia
- David Lindsay (footballer, born 1919) (1919–1987), Scottish footballer
- David Lindsay (novelist) (1876–1945), Scottish author
- David Lindsay (rugby union) (1906–1978), New Zealand rugby union footballer
- David Lindsay (Scottish footballer), Scottish footballer
- David Lindsay (swimmer) (1906–1943), New Zealand swimmer
- David Lindsay, 1st Lord Balcarres (1587–1642), Scottish nobleman
- David Lindsay, 1st Earl of Crawford (c.1360–1407), Scottish peer
- David Lindsay, 3rd Earl of Crawford (died 1446), regent to James II of Scotland
- David Lindsay, 8th Earl of Crawford (died 1542), Scottish nobleman
- David Lindsay, 9th Earl of Crawford (died 1558), Scottish peer and Member of Parliament
- David Lindsay, 10th Earl of Crawford (1527–1574), Scottish nobleman
- David Lindsay, 11th Earl of Crawford (c.1547–1607), Scottish nobleman
- David Lindsay, 12th Earl of Crawford (1577–1620), Scottish nobleman
- David Lindsay, 27th Earl of Crawford (1871–1940), British politician and art connoisseur
- David Lindsay, 28th Earl of Crawford (1900–1975), British politician
- David Lindsay, 2nd Lord Lindsay (died 1490), Scottish peer
- David Lindsay, 1st Duke of Montrose (1440–1495), Scottish nobleman
- Sir David Lindsay, 4th Baronet (c.1732–1797), Scottish soldier
- David Lindsay-Abaire (born 1969), American playwright, lyricist and screenwriter
- David Lindesay-Bethune, 15th Earl of Lindsay (1926–1989), British soldier
- D. Michael Lindsay (David Michael Lindsay) (born 1971), American sociologist and college head
- David Lyndsay (c.1490–c.1555; alias Lindsay), Scottish herald, poet and playwright
- David Lyndsay, literary pseudonym of Mary Diana Dods (1790–1830)
- Delia Lindsay (born 1945), English actress
- Denis Christopher Lindsay (born 1943/4), British botanist
- Denis Lindsay (cricketer) (1939–2005), South African cricketer
- Diana Lindsay (born 1944), American independent publisher, author and photographer
- Diane Lindsay, US Army Nurse Corps awarded the Soldier's Medal
- Dora Lindsay (c.1870s–c.1940s), Scottish comedian and singer
- Doreen Lindsay (born 1934), Canadian artist
- Duncan Lindsay (Scottish footballer) (1902–1972), Scottish football player
- Duncan Lindsay (Australian footballer) (1902–1967), Australian rules footballer

== E ==
- Elaine Lindsay (born 1948), Australian academic
- Elizabeth Lindsay (1912–2013), American track and field athlete and Girl Scout activist
- Elizabeth Sherman Lindsay (1885–1954), American landscape gardener and Red Cross executive
- Eric Mervyn Lindsay (1907–1974), Irish astronomer
- Erica Lindsay (born 1955), American jazz saxophonist and composer
- Everett Lindsay (born 1970), American football player

== F ==
- Fernand Lindsay (1929–2009), Canadian cleric
- Franklin Lindsay (1916–2011), American business executive and spy
- Frannie Lindsay, American poet
- Freddie Aughtry-Lindsay (born 1982), American football coach
- Fred Lindsay (born 1946), Canadian politician
- Freeman Lindsay (1837–1896), American politician from Wisconsin
- Frog Lindsay (1885–1964), American baseball player

== G ==
- Gavin Lindsay (born 1929), Canadian ice hockey player
- George Lindsay (British Army officer) (1880–1956), British developer of mechanised warfare
- George Campbell Lindsay (1863–1905), Scottish rugby union footballer
- George Edmund Lindsay (1916–2002), American botanist, naturalist and museum director
- George C. Lindsay (1855–1945), American composer and guitarist
- George H. Lindsay (1837–1916), American businessman and politician
- George W. Lindsay (1865–1938), American businessman and politician, son of George H. Lindsay
- George Lindsay, 3rd Lord Spynie (died 1671), Scottish nobleman
- George Lindsay-Crawford, 21st Earl of Crawford (1723–1781), Scottish nobleman
- George Lindsay-Crawford, 22nd Earl of Crawford (1758–1808), Scottish peer and soldier
- Germaine Lindsay (1985–2005), Jamaican-born British Islamist terrorist
- Gilbert W. Lindsay (1900–1990), American politician
- Gillian Lindsay (born 1973), Scottish rower
- Gordon Lindsay (footballer) (1911–1967), Australian rules footballer
- Grant Lindsay (born 1979), Australian cricketer
- Greg Lindsay (born 1949), Australian think tank head
- Gross Lindsay (1930–2008), American politician from Kentucky

== H ==
- Harriet Loyd-Lindsay, Baroness Wantage (1837–1920), British art collector
- Harry Lindsay (civil servant) (1881–1963), British civil servant and administrator
- Harry Lindsay (rugby union) (died 1908), Irish rugby union footballer
- Henry Lindsay, 13th Earl of Crawford (died 1623), Scottish courtier and landowner
- Herb Lindsay (born 1954), American long-distance runner
- Hilarie Lindsay (1922–2021), Australian toy manufacturer and writer
- Homer G. Lindsay Jr. (1927–2000), American preacher
- Howard Lindsay (1889–1968), American playwright, theatrical producer and director, and actor
- Howard Lindsay (athlete) (born 1963), Antiguan and Barbudan runner
- Hsiao Li Lindsay, Baroness Lindsay of Birker (1916–2010), British peeress
- Hugh Lindsay (bishop) (1927–2009), British Catholic bishop
- Hugh Lindsay (British Army officer) (1953–1988), British soldier and courtier
- Hugh Lindsay (footballer) (born 1938), English amateur footballer
- Hugh Hamilton Lindsay (1802–1881), British businessman
- Hugh Primrose Lindsay (1765–1844), British naval captain, Chairman of the East India Company and Member of Parliament.
- Hugh B. Lindsay (1856–1944), American attorney, jurist and politician from Tennessee
- Humphrey Broun Lindsay (1888–1964), British Army officer and politician
- H. A. Lindsay (1900–1969), Australian writer for children

== I ==
- Iain Lindsay (born 1959), British diplomat
- Ian Gordon Lindsay (1906–1966), Scottish architect
- Inabel Burns Lindsay (1900–1983), American social worker and academic
- Ingram Lindsay, 15th-century Scottish cleric and canon law jurist
- Isobel Lindsay (born 1943), Scottish academic, nationalist and peace activist

== J ==
- Jack Lindsay (1900–1990), Australian writer, son of Norman Lindsay
- Jack Lindsay (footballer, born 1921) (1921–2006), Scottish footballer
- James Lindsay of Crawford (died 1358) (died 1358), Scottish nobleman
- James Lindsay of Crawford (died 1395/6) (died 1395/6), Scottish nobleman
- James Lindsay (actor) (1869–1928), British actor
- James Lindsay (British Army officer) (1815–1874), British soldier and politician, son of James Lindsay, 24th Earl of Crawford
- James Lindsay (North Devon MP) (1906–1997), British politician
- James Lindsay (theologian) (1852–1923), Scottish minister, theologian and author
- James Alexander Lindsay (physician) (1856–1931), British physician and academic
- James Bowman Lindsay (1799–1862), Scottish inventor and author
- James Gordon Lindsay (1906–1973), American revivalist preacher
- James A. Lindsay (born 1979), American author
- James J. Lindsay (1932–2023), American general
- James M. Lindsay (born 1959), American academic and foreign policy specialist
- James R. Lindsay (James Robert Lindsay) (1865–1940), United States Army officer
- James Lindsay, 5th Earl of Balcarres (1691–1768), Scottish peer
- James Lindsay, 24th Earl of Crawford (1783–1869), British Army officer and politician
- James Lindsay, 26th Earl of Crawford (1847–1913), Scottish astronomer, politician, ornithologist and collector
- James Lindsay, 3rd Baron Lindsay of Birker (born January 1945), Australian diplomat
- James Lindsay, 7th Lord Lindsay (1554–1601), Scottish courtier and landowner
- James Lindsay-Fynn (born 1975), British rower
- James Lindsay, 5th Earl of Balcarres (1691–1768), Scottish peer
- James Lindsay, 24th Earl of Crawford (1783–1869), Scottish peer
- Jamie Lindsay (footballer, born 1870) (born c. 1870), Scottish footballer
- James Lindsay (footballer) (1891–1951), Scottish footballer
- Jamie Lindsay (footballer, born 1995) (born 1995), Scottish footballer
- Jan Lindsay (born 1970), New Zealand geologist
- Janelle Lindsay (born 1976), Australian paralympic tandem cycling pilot
- J. O. Lindsay (Jean Olivia Lindsay) (1910–1996), British historian and school head
- Jeff Lindsay (born 1952), American playwright and crime novelist
- Jenn Lindsay (born 1978), American sociologist, documentary filmmaker and singer-songwriter
- Jenny Lindsay (born 1982), Scottish poet and performer
- Jimmy Lindsay (footballer, born 1880) (1880–1925), English football player
- Jimmy Lindsay (footballer, born 1949), Scottish football player
- Jimmy Lindsay (footballer, born 1958), Scottish football player and coach
- Joan Lindsay (1896–1984), Australian novelist, playwright, essayist and visual artist
- John de Lindsay (fl.1323), Scottish bishop of Glasgow.
- John Lindsay (1921–2000), American lawyer and politician
- John Lindsay of Wauchope (died c.1310), Scottish nobleman
- John Lindsay of Balcarres, Lord Menmuir (1552–1598), Secretary of State of Scotland
- John Lindsay (footballer, born 1862) (1862–1932), Scottish association football player for Accrington F.C.
- John Lindsay (footballer, born 1924) (1924–1991), Scottish association football player for Rangers and Everton
- John Lindsay (footballer, born 1900) (1900–?), Scottish association football player for Partick Thistle, Rhyl Athletic, Liverpool, Swansea Town and Bangor City
- John Lindsay (musician) (1894–1950), American jazz musician
- John Lindsay (New Zealand cricketer) (born 1957), New Zealand cricketer
- John Lindsay (Paralympian) (born 1970), Australian Paralympian
- John Lindsay (Royal Navy officer) (1737–1788), British naval officer
- John Lindsay (South Australian politician) (c.1821–1898), businessman and politician in South Australia
- John Lindsay (Western Australian politician) (1876–1957), politician in Western Australia
- John Jesnor Lindsay (1935–2006), Scottish photographer and film-maker
- John Lindsay, 6th Earl of Crawford (died 1513), Scottish nobleman
- John Lindsay, 17th Earl of Crawford (c. 1598–1679), Scottish nobleman
- John Lindsay, 19th Earl of Crawford (died 1713), Scottish peer and politician
- John Lindsay, 20th Earl of Crawford (1702–1749), Scottish colonel of the Black Watch
- John Lindsay, 5th Lord Lindsay (died 1563), Scottish judge
- John Lindsay, 8th Lord Lindsay (died 1609), Scottish landowner
- Johnny Lindsay (John Dixon Lindsay) (1908–1990), South African cricketer
- Jon Lindsay (musician) (born 1980/1), American recording artist
- Jon Lindsay (politician) (1935–2026), American politician from Texas Senate
- Jonathan Lindsay (born 1992), Scottish footballer
- Joseph Lindsay (1858–1933), Scottish footballer
- Julian Stewart Lindsay, British composer
- Justine Lindsay (born 1992), American dancer and cheerleader

== K ==
- Kara Lindsay (born 1985), American stage actress and singer
- Kathleen Lindsay (1903–1973), English writer of historical romance
- Kennedy Lindsay (1924–1997), Northern Ireland politician
- Kenneth Lindsay (1897–1991), Labour Party politician
- Kevin Lindsay (1924–1975), Australian actor
- Kylie Lindsay (born 1983), New Zealand squash player

== L ==
- La-Chun Lindsay, American aerospace engineer
- Lawrie Lindsay (1921–1985), Scottish footballer
- Leonard Lindsay (1909–1988), American baseball player
- Liam Lindsay (born 1995), Scottish footballer
- Lilian Lindsay (1871–1960), British dentist
- Linda Lindsay (born 1950), New Zealand cricketer
- Lindsay Lindsay-Hogg (1853–1923), British horse breeder, Member of Parliament and baronet
- Lionel Lindsay (1874–1961), Australian artist, brother of Norman Lindsay
- Loelia Lindsay (1902–1993), British socialite, needlewoman and magazine editor
- Livingston Lindsay (1806–1892), American judge
- Ludovic Lindsay, 16th Earl of Crawford (1600–1652), Scottish landowner and Royalist
- Luther Lindsay (1924–1972), American professional wrestler
- Lynne Lindsay-Payne, Namibian lawn bowls competitor

== M ==
- Malcolm Lindsay (1909–1983), Royal Canadian Mounted Police commissioner
- Malvina Lindsay (1893–1972), American columnist and editor
- Mandy Lindsay, American politician from Colorado
- Margaret Lindsay (1910–1981), American film actress
- Margaret Lindsay, later Margaret Lindsay Ramsay (c.1726–1782), wife of the artist Allan Ramsay
- Mark Lindsay (born 1942), American pop singer
- Mark Lindsay (footballer) (born 1955), English footballer
- Mark F. Lindsay (born 1963), American official
- Martin Lindsay (boxer) (born 1982), Northern Irish boxer
- Sir Martin Lindsay, 1st Baronet (1905–1981), British politician and explorer
- Maria Lindsay (1827–1898), English composer and songwriter
- Mary Alice Powell Lindsay (1883–1979), American registered nurse
- Maud McKnight Lindsay (1874–1941), American educator
- Maurice Lindsay (rugby league) (1941–2022), English rugby league administrator
- Maurice Lindsay (broadcaster) (1918–2009), Scottish broadcaster, writer and poet
- Mayne Lindsay (1873–1955), British author
- Megan Lindsay (born 1991), American soccer player
- Merle Lindsay (1916–1965), American Western swing musician
- Michael Lindsay (1963–2019), American voice actor
- Michael Lindsay, 2nd Baron Lindsay of Birker (1909–1994), British peer and academic
- Michael Lindsay-Hogg (born 1940), British-American television, film, music video and theatre director, and baronet
- Michael Ahomka-Lindsay (born 1997), English actor
- Mike Lindsay (1938–2019), British track and field athlete
- Morgan Lindsay (1857–1935), British Army officer and racehorse trainer

== N ==
- Nathan J. Lindsay (1936–2015), American astronaut
- Neville Lindsay (1886–1976), South African cricketer
- Nicholas Lindsay (born 1992), Canadian soccer player
- Nicola Lindsay (born 1944), English writer and actor in Ireland
- Nigel Lindsay (born 1969), English actor
- Ninian Lindsay (1753–1828), political figure in New Brunswick
- Noel Lindsay (1904–c. 1966), British barrister and politician
- Norah Lindsay (1873–1948), British garden designer
- Norman Lindsay (1879–1969), Australian artist and writer

== O ==
- Ollie Lindsay-Hague (born 1990), English rugby union footballer
- Orland Lindsay (1928–2023), Antiguan Anglican clergyman

== P ==
- Pat Lindsay (born 1950), Irish Gaelic footballer
- Patrick Lindsay (bishop) (1566–1644), Archbishop of Glasgow
- Patrick Lindsay (Edinburgh MP) (1686–1753), British Army officer and Scottish politician
- Patrick Lindsay (Irish politician) (1914–1993), Irish Fine Gael politician
- Patrick Lindsay, 4th Lord Lindsay (died 1526), counsellor of James IV of Scotland
- Patrick Lindsay, 6th Lord Lindsay (1521–1589), Scottish courtier and Confederate lord
- Paul Lindsay (born 1976), Australian rules footballer
- Percy Lindsay (1870–1952), Australian artist, brother of Norman Lindsay
- Peta Lindsay (born 1984), American anti-war activist
- Peter Lindsay (born 1944), Australian politician
- Peter Lindsay (rowing) (born 1951), New Zealand coxswain
- Philip Lindsay (1906–1958), Australian writer, son of Norman Lindsay
- Phillip Lindsay (born 1994), American football player
- Powell Lindsay (1905–1987), American actor

== R ==
- Rachel Lindsay (cartoonist) (born 1987), American cartoonist
- Rachel Lindsay (television personality) (born 1985), American attorney, media personality and podcaster
- Reg Lindsay (1929–2008), Australian country and western singer
- Reginald C. Lindsay (1945–2009), American judge
- Richard Lindsay (West Virginia politician) (born 1977), American politician from West Virginia
- Richard C. Lindsay (1905–1990), United States Air Force lieutenant general
- Richard P. Lindsay (1926–2010), American politician from Utah and LDS Church general authority
- Robert de Lindsay (fl. 1100s), Scottish nobleman
- Robert Lindsay of Pitscottie (c.1532–1580), Scottish chronicler
- Robert Lindsay (actor) (born 1949), English actor
- Robert Lindsay (athlete) (1890–1958), British track and field athlete
- Robert Lindsay (Australian politician) (1905–2000), Australian politician
- Robert Lindsay (colonial official) (1754–1836), Scottish colonial administrator
- Robert Lindsay (New York politician) (1895/6–1972), American politician from Staten Island
- Robert Lindsay (North Carolina politician) (c.1735–1801), American politician from North Carolina
- Robert Lindsay (Tyrone MP) (1679–1743), Irish barrister, politician and judge
- Robert Bruce Lindsay (1900–1985), American physicist
- Robert Henry Lindsay (1868–1938), Canadian painter
- Robert Opie Lindsay (1894–1952), American World War I flying ace
- Robert B. Lindsay (1824–1902), Scottish-American politician, governor of Alabama
- Robert D. Lindsay (1919–1999), Canadian politician
- Robert Lindsay, 9th Lord Lindsay (died 1616), Scottish landowner
- Robert Lindsay, 29th Earl of Crawford (1927–2023), Scottish politician
- Robert Lindsay-Watson (1886–1956), Scottish rugby union footballer
- Robert Loyd-Lindsay, 1st Baron Wantage (1832–1901), British soldier, politician and philanthropist
- Robin Lindsay (1914–2011), British field hockey player
- Robin Lindsay (British Army officer), British major-general
- R. C. L. Lindsay (Roderick Cameron Lodge Lindsay) (born 1946), Canadian psychologist
- Roger Lindsay (1941–2023), Canadian accountant
- Ronald Lindsay (1877–1945), Scottish diplomat, son of James Lindsay, 26th Earl of Crawford
- Ronald A. Lindsay, American secular humanist
- Rose Lindsay (1885–1978), Australian artist's model, author and printmaker
- Roy Lindsay (1905—1972), Australian rugby union footballer
- Ruby Lindsay (1885–1919), Australian artist, sister of Norman Lindsay
- Rus Lindsay, American college football and baseball player
- Ryan Lindsay (ice hockey) (born 1976), Canadian ice hockey player
- Ryan Lindsay (singer) (born 1993), Canadian country music singer
- Ryan Lindsay (soccer) (born 2001), Canadian soccer player

== S ==
- Sally Lindsay (born 1973), English actress and television presenter
- Sam A. Lindsay (born 1951), American attorney and judge
- Sandie Lindsay, 1st Baron Lindsay of Birker (1879–1952), Master of Balliol College, Oxford, son of Thomas Martin Lindsay
- Sarah Lindsay (born 1958), American poet
- Sarah Lindsay (speed skater) (born 1980), British short track speed skater
- Shane Lindsay (born 1985), Australian baseball pitcher
- Shawn Lindsay (born 1973), American attorney and politician from Oregon
- Somerville Lindsay (1854–1933), Anglo-Irish priest of the Church of Ireland and author
- Stephen Lindsay, American cognitive psychologist
- Steven Lindsay (born 1964), Canadian outlaw biker and gangster

== T ==
- Taylor Lindsay-Noel (born 1993), Canadian gymnast, disability rights activist and entrepreneur
- Ted Lindsay (1925–2019), Canadian–American ice hockey player
- Ted Lindsay (politician) (born 1942), Australian politician
- Thomas Lindsay (academic), American academic and college head
- Thomas Lindsay (bishop) (1656–1724), Church of Ireland cleric
- Thomas Lindsay (priest) (1863–1947), English Anglican cleric
- Thomas Martin Lindsay (1843–1914), Scottish historian, academic and college head
- Tina Lindsay, English footballer
- Tom Lindsay (rugby union) (born 1987), English rugby union footballer
- Tom Lindsay (footballer) (1903–1979), Scottish footballer
- Tony Lindsay (born 1954), American singer
- Travis Lindsay, Canadian comedian

== V ==
- Vachel Lindsay (1879–1931), American poet
- Vera Lindsay (1911–1992), British Shakespearean actress

== W ==
- Wallace Lindsay (1858–1937), Scottish classical scholar and palaeographer
- Walter Lindsay (1855–1930), British general
- Walter de Lindsay of Lamberton (died 1221), Scottish nobleman
- Walter II de Lindsay of Lamberton (died 1271), Scottish nobleman
- Walter Lindsay of Balgavie (died 1605), Scottish Catholic intriguer
- Wendy Lindsay, Australian politician
- William de Lindsay (1155–1205), Scottish nobleman
- William de Lindsay of Luffness (c.1179–c.1238), Scottish nobleman, son of William de Lindsay
- William Lindsay of Dowhill (1638–1679), Scottish Presbyterian minister
- William I de Lindsay of Lamberton (died 1247), Scottish nobleman
- William Lindsay (actor) (1945–1986), British television actor
- William Lindsay (baseball) (1905–2006), American baseball player
- William Lindsay (Canadian politician) (1813–1895), merchant and political figure in New Brunswick
- William Lindsay (diplomat) (died 1796), Scottish diplomat and colonial governor
- William Lindsay (field hockey) (1916–1971), British field hockey player
- William Lindsay (English footballer) (1847–1923), England footballer
- William Lindsay (Kentucky politician) (1835–1909), American politician from Kentucky
- William Lindsay (minister) (1802–1866), Scottish United Presbyterian minister
- William Lindsay (officer of arms) (1846–1926), herald at the College of Arms in London
- William Lindsay (Scottish footballer) (1886–1976), Scottish footballer
- William Lindsay (shipowner) (1819–1884), Scottish lawyer and shipowner
- William Lindsay (Wisconsin politician) (1840–1927), American politician from Wisconsin
- William Lindsay (Canadian politician) (1813–1895), Irish-born merchant and political figure in New Brunswick, Canada
- William Arthur Lindsay (1866–1936), Northern Irish Member of Parliament
- William Bethune Lindsay (1880–1933), Canadian military officer during World War I
- William Burns Lindsay Jr. (1824–1872), Clerk of the House of Commons of Canada
- William Lindesay-Bethune, 14th Earl of Lindsay (1901–1985), British soldier
- William Lauder Lindsay (1829–1880), Scottish botanist
- William O'Brien Lindsay (1909–1975), British colonial judge and cricketer
- William Schaw Lindsay (1815–1877), British merchant and Member of Parliament
- William J. Lindsay (1945–2013), American politician in Suffolk County, New York
- William M. Lindsay (1880–1957), American politician, Lieutenant Governor of Kansas
- William Lindsay, 18th Earl of Crawford (died 1698), Scottish nobleman
- Willie Kirkpatrick Lindsay (1875–1954), American educator and temperance activist

== X ==
- Xavier Lindsay (born 2006), Australian rules footballer

== Y ==
- Yvonne Lindsay, romance novelist from New Zealand

== See also ==
- Lindesay
- Lyndsay (name)
- Lindsey (surname)
