= David Lindsay =

David Lindsay may refer to:

== Nobility ==
- David de Lindsay (died 1214), Anglo-Scottish baron of the early 13th century
- David de Lindsay of the Byres (died 1270), Scottish knight and crusader
- Sir David Lindsay of Crawford (died 1355), Scottish noble
- David Lindsay, 1st Earl of Crawford (c. 1360–1407), Scottish peer
- David Lindsay, 3rd Earl of Crawford (died 1446), regent to James II of Scotland
- David Lindsay, 8th Earl of Crawford (died 1542)
- David Lindsay, 9th Earl of Crawford (died 1558), Scottish peer and member of parliament
- David Lindsay, 10th Earl of Crawford (1527–1574), Earl of Crawford
- David Lindsay, 11th Earl of Crawford (c. 1547–1607), Scottish nobleman
- David Lindsay, 12th Earl of Crawford (1577–1620), Scottish nobleman
- David Lindsay, 27th Earl of Crawford (1871–1940), British Conservative politician and art connoisseur
- David Lindsay, 28th Earl of Crawford (1900–1975), also 11th Earl of Balcarres
- David Lindsay, 1st Duke of Montrose (1440–1495), Scottish nobleman
- David Lindsay, 2nd Lord Lindsay (died 1490), Scottish peers
- David Lyndsay (c. 1490 – c. 1555; alias Lindsay), Scottish herald
- David Lindsay, 1st Lord Balcarres (1587–1642), Scottish nobleman

== Religion ==
- David Lindsay (bishop of Edinburgh) (1575–1641), also bishop of Brechin
- David Lindsay (bishop of Ross) (1531–1613)
- David Lindsay (minister) (c. 1583–1667), Church of Scotland minister and author

== Sports ==
- David Lindsay (swimmer) (1906–1943), New Zealand swimmer
- David Lindsay (rugby union) (1906–1978), New Zealand rugby union player
- David Lindsay (footballer, born 1919) (1919–1987), Scottish footballer
- David Lindsay (English footballer) (born 1966), English former professional player
- David Lindsay (Scottish footballer), Scottish international player

== Literature ==
- David Lindsay (novelist) (1876–1945), Scottish novelist, author of A Voyage to Arcturus
- David Lindsay-Abaire (born 1969), American playwright and lyricist
- Sir David Lyndsay or Lindsay (c. 1490 – c. 1555), Scottish Renaissance poet and playwright
- David Lyndsay, a literary pseudonym of Scottish writer Mary Diana Dods (1790–1830)

== Other ==
- David Lindsay of Edzell, Lord Edzell (c. 1551–1610), Scottish judge, son of David Lindsay, 9th Earl of Crawford
- Sir David Lindsay, 4th Baronet (c. 1732–1797), British Army officer
- David Lindsay (explorer) (1856–1922), Australian explorer

== See also ==
- David Lindley (disambiguation)
- David L. Lindsey (born 1944), American novelist
- David Lindsey (politician) (born 1931), member of the Florida House of Representatives
- Earl of Crawford
