= James Alexander Lindsay =

James Alexander Lindsay may refer to:

- James Lindsay (British Army officer) (1815–1874), British Army officer and Conservative Party MP for Wigan
- James Alexander Lindsay (physician) (1856–1931), British physician and professor of medicine

== See also ==
- James Lindsay (disambiguation)
