= David Lindsey =

David Lindsey may refer to:

- David L. Lindsey (born 1944), American novelist
- David Lindsey (politician) (born 1931), member of the Florida House of Representatives

== See also ==
- David Lindsay (disambiguation)
