= Harry Lindsay =

Harry Lindsay may refer to:

- Harry Lindsay (civil servant) (1881–1963), British civil servant and administrator
- Harry Lindsay (rugby union) (died 1908), Irish international rugby union player
