= James Lindsay =

James Lindsay may refer to:

== British peerage ==
- James Lindsay of Crawford (died 1358) (died 1358), Scottish nobleman
- James Lindsay of Crawford (died 1395/6) (died 1395/6), Scottish nobleman
- James Lindsay, 5th Earl of Balcarres (1691–1768), Scottish peer
- James Lindsay, 24th Earl of Crawford (1783–1869), Scottish peer

== Politics ==
- James Lindsay (British Army officer) (1815–1874), British Army officer and Conservative Party MP for Wigan
- James Lindsay, 26th Earl of Crawford (1847–1913), Victorian astronomer and politician
- James Lindsay (North Devon MP) (1906–1997), British Conservative Party MP for North Devon
- James Lindsay, 3rd Baron Lindsay of Birker (born 1945), retired Australian diplomat

== Religion ==
- James Lindsay (theologian) (1852–1923), Scottish minister, theologian and author
- James Gordon Lindsay (1906–1973), revivalist preacher, author, and founder of Christ for the Nations

== Sport ==
- Jamie Lindsay (footballer, born 1870) (born c. 1870), Scottish footballer
- James Lindsay (footballer) (1891–1951), Scottish footballer
- Jamie Lindsay (footballer, born 1995), Scottish footballer (Celtic FC, Dumbarton FC, Ross County FC, currently Rotherham United FC)

== Others ==
- James Bowman Lindsay (1799–1862), Scottish inventor and author noted for his invention of the electric light bulb
- James Lindsay (actor) (1869–1928), British actor
- James J. Lindsay (born 1932), U.S. Army general
- James M. Lindsay (born 1959), American academic and foreign policy specialist
- James A. Lindsay (born 1979), American author
- James Alexander Lindsay (physician) (1856–1931), British physician and professor of medicine

== See also ==
- Jimmy Lindsay (disambiguation)
- James Lindesay-Bethune, 16th Earl of Lindsay (born 1955), Scottish nobleman
- Jim Lindsey (disambiguation)
