= Walter II de Lindsay of Lamberton =

Scottish noble

Walter de Lindsay
- Lord of Lamberton and Molesworth
- Died: 1271
- Noble family: Lindsay family
- Spouse: Christiana
- Father: William de Lindsay
- Mother: Alice de Lancaster

Walter de Lindsay (died 1271), Lord of Lamberton and Molesworth, Fordington and Ulceby, was a Scottish noble, who held lands in Scotland and England.

== Life ==
Walter was a son of William I de Lindsay of Lamberton and Alice de Lancaster. His father was Sheriff of Berwick, however there is no record of Walter serving as sheriff. He received a destraint of knighthood from King Henry III of England. King Alexander III of Scotland requested that Henry III remove the destraint when Walter returns from pilgrimage to Santiago de Campostela. Walter served as an envoy to Henry III in 1265. He died in 1271. His widow Christiana was married to Walter de Percy, the younger son of William de Percy of Topcliffe, as his second wife.

== Marriage and issue ==
Walter married Christiana, of unknown parentage, they are known to have had the following issue:

- William II de Lindsay of Lamberton, married Ada de Balliol, had issue.
- Margaret de Lindsay, married David de Lindsay of Crawford, had issue.
