= Robert Lindsay =

Robert Lindsay may refer to:

== Politics and law ==
- Robert Lindsay (Tyrone MP) (1679–1743), Irish barrister, politician and judge
- Robert Lindsay (North Carolina politician) (c. 1735–1801), American politician, North Carolina General Assembly
- Robert Lindsay (colonial official) (1754–1836), Scottish colonial official
- Robert B. Lindsay (1824–1902), Scottish-American politician, governor of Alabama
- Robert Lindsay (New York politician) (1894–1972), American politician from Staten Island
- Robert Lindsay (Australian politician) (1905–2000), Australian politician
- Robert D. Lindsay (1919–1999), Canadian politician
- Robert Lindsay, 29th Earl of Crawford (1927–2023), Scottish politician

== Sports ==
- Frog Lindsay (Robert Alexander Lindsay, 1885–1964), American baseball player
- Robert Lindsay-Watson (1886–1956), Scottish rugby union player
- Robert Lindsay (athlete) (1890–1958), British Olympic track and field athlete

== Others ==
- Robert de Lindsay (fl. 1100s), Scottish noble
- Robert Lindsay of Pitscottie (ca. 1532–1580), Scottish chronicler
- Robert Henry Lindsay (1868–1938), Canadian painter
- Robert Opie Lindsay (1894–1952), American World War II flying ace
- Robert Bruce Lindsay (1900–1985), American physicist
- Robert Lindsay (actor) (born 1949), English actor
- Robert Lindsay, 9th Lord Lindsay (died 1616), Scottish landowner

== See also ==
- Robert Lindsey (disambiguation)
- Robert Linzee (1739–1804), officer of the Royal Navy
- Robin Lindsay (Frederick Robert Lindsay, 1914–2011), British field hockey player
