= Jimmy Lindsay =

Jimmy Lindsay may refer to:

- Jimmy Lindsay (footballer, born 1880) (1880–1925), English football player (Newcastle United, Burnley FC, Bury FC)
- Jimmy Lindsay (footballer, born 1949), Scottish football player (West Ham United, Watford FC, Colchester United, Hereford United, Shrewsbury Town)
- Jimmy Lindsay (footballer, born 1958), Scottish football player and coach (Motherwell FC)

== See also ==
- James Lindsay (disambiguation)
