= William Burney Bannerman =

Scottish military surgeon (1858–1924)

Major General William Burney Bannerman CSI FRSE (6 July 1858 – 3 February 1924) was a 19th and 20th century high-ranking Scottish military surgeon who worked in the Indian Medical Service. As director of the plague research laboratory, he conducted experiments on plague vaccines along with Waldemar Haffkine. He was one of the first to use Henry Littlejohn's analytical techniques on a large scale, demonstrating the value of inoculation.

== Life ==
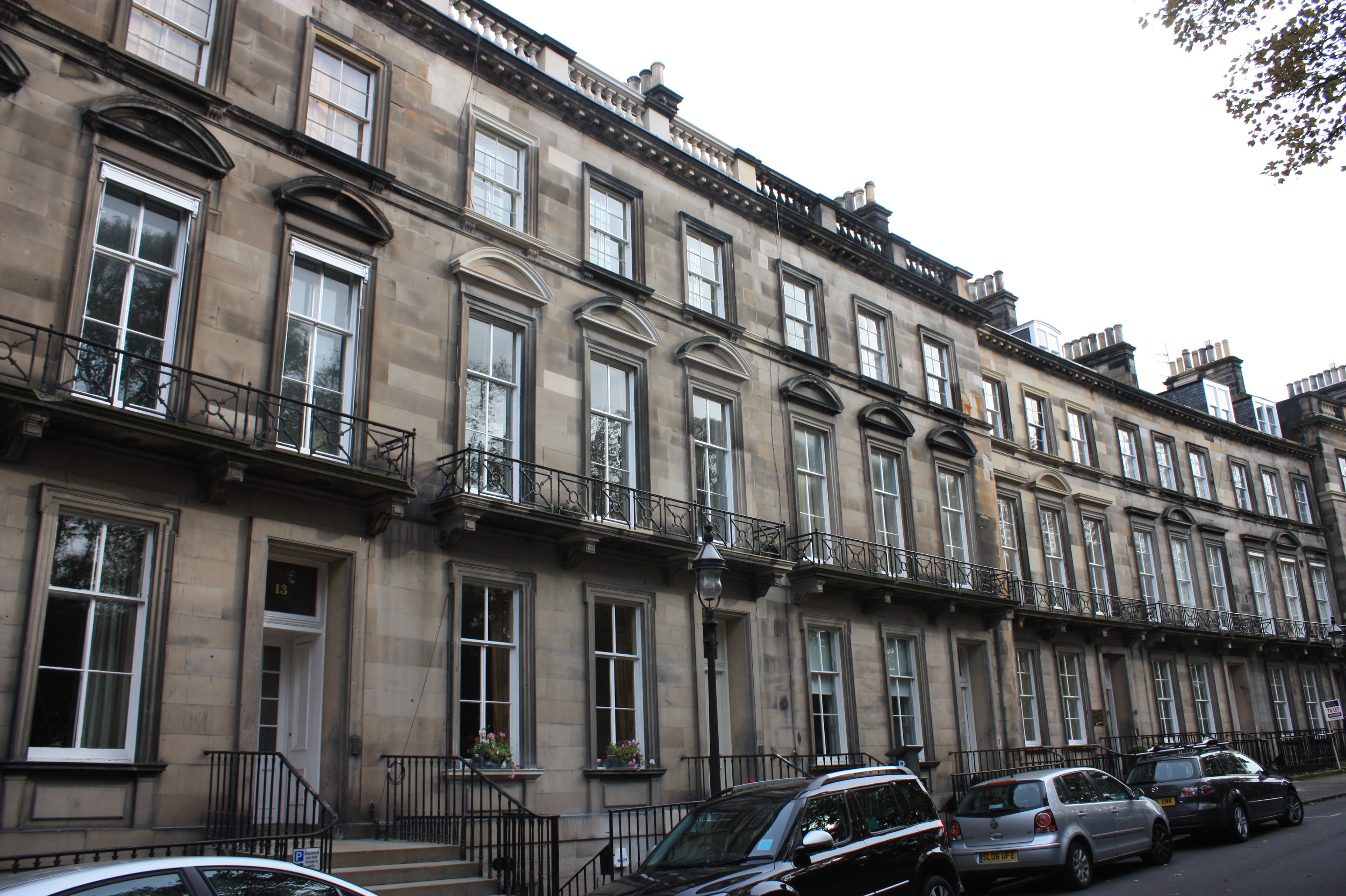
Clarendon Crescent in Edinburgh

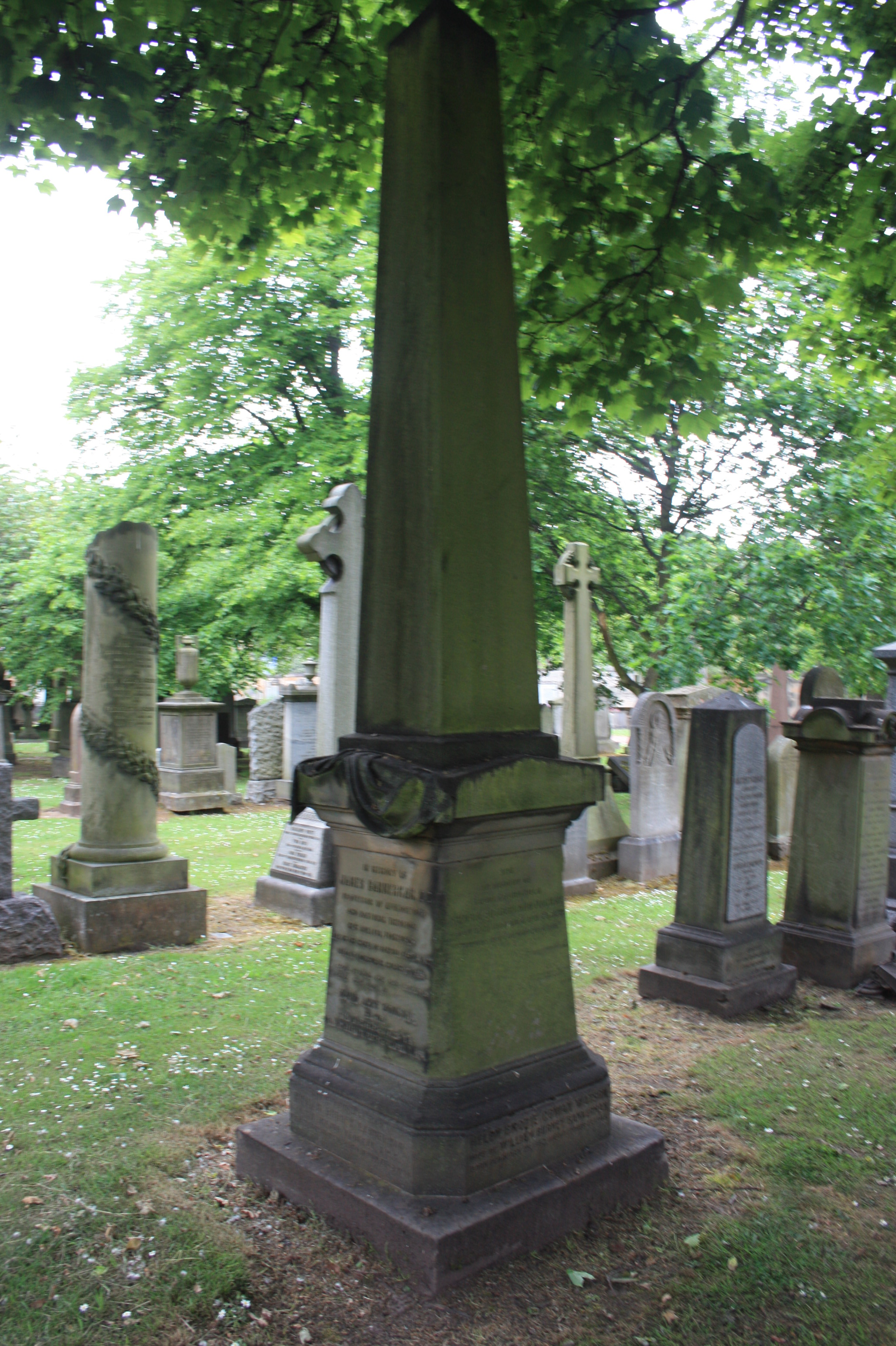
The Bannerman grave, Grange Cemetery

He was born at 7 Clarendon Crescent in Edinburgh on 6 July 1858, the son of Rev James Bannerman and David Anne Douglas (sic), daughter of David Douglas, Lord Reston. He was educated at Edinburgh Academy then studied medicine at the University of Edinburgh, graduating as Bachelor of Medicine and Master of Surgery (MB CM) in 1881.

Joining the British Army as part of the Indian Medical Service he served as a surgeon from 1883. Training at Netley, he arrived at Bombay in May 1884 initially posted at Secunderabad. After some training in Urdu he was posted to Baluchistan to control a cholera epidemic there. In 1886 he contracted malaria and went to Madras to recover. He was then posted to Tiruchirapalli (mentioned as Trichinopoli under the colonial bastardisation of the name). In November 1886 he was sent to Burma on active duty first in Mandalay then in Pyintha. From March to October 1888 he served with the Upper Burma Operational Force. Falling ill again, he was sent to England for a year to recover. He received his doctorate (MD) entitled 'On the nature of malaria and its prophylaxsis' in 1889 and returned to India in November 1889. Continuing in the army, he became district surgeon to the Mangalore district. He returned to the University of Edinburgh 1895/6 to take a course on public health from Henry Harvey Littlejohn. Returning to India in 1896 early in 1898 he undertook along with Waldemar Haffkine, what would now be a highly controversial experiment in the village of Undhera, Vadodara District, where there was a plague outbreak. On an arbitrary selection basis he inoculated exactly half of the village and (using Littlejohn principles) observed the results – obtaining an accurate (if perhaps inhumane) result of the effectiveness of the vaccine (proving it 90% effective).

In April 1899 he was made director of the Plague Research Laboratory in Madras. He was raised to lieutenant colonel in 1903. In 1904 he became director of the Bombay Bacteriological Laboratory and in 1910 was raised to brevet colonel. In May 1911 he became surgeon general for the Madras district. In 1913 he was created honorary physician to King George V (in India).

In 1902 he elected a fellow of the Royal Society of Edinburgh. His proposers were Sir William Turner, Alexander Crum Brown, Sir Thomas Richard Fraser and Charles Hunter Stewart. He served as the Society's Vice-President from 1921 to 1924.

King George V created him a Companion of the Order of the Star of India (CSI) in 1911.

He remained in Madras for the duration of the First World War but lost most of his senior and experienced officers who were sent on medical duties elsewhere.

He retired to Edinburgh in 1918 and spent much time linked to the United Free Church of Scotland where he was an elder and Secretary of the Foreign Mission Committee. His church St George's United Free, was the impressive domed church on the west side of Charlotte Square. He was Secretary of the church's Foreign Mission Committee.

He died at home on 3 February 1924.

He is buried with his parents in the Grange Cemetery in south Edinburgh. The grave lies in the north-west section under a large tree.

== Publications ==
- Preface to Concerning Animals and Other Matters
- Serum Therapy of Plague in India
- Production of Alkali by Plague Bacillus in Liquid Media
- Scientific Memoirs of Government in India

== Family ==
In 1889 he married Helen Brodie Cowan Watson (1862–1946), daughter of Robert Boog Watson. She is remembered as Helen Bannerman, author of the "Little Sambo" children's books.
