= Walter de Lindsay of Lamberton =

Scottish noble

Walter de Lindsay
- Died: 1221
- Noble family: Lindsay family
- Father: William de Lindsay
- Mother: Aleanora de Limesay

Walter de Lindsay (died 1221), Lord of Lamberton and Molesworth, Fordington and Ulceby, Justiciar of Lothian, Sheriff of Berwick was a Scottish noble, who held lands in Scotland and England.

== Life ==
Lindsay was a son of William de Lindsay and Alice or Aleanora de Limesay or de Limési. Walter held the office of Constable or Sheriff of Berwick. Walter confirmed in a charter to Croyland Abbey, the churches of Fordington and Ulceby. He held the office of Justiciar of Lothian between 1206 and 1215. Walter also was the Scottish Ambassador for King Alexander II of Scotland to England in 1215. Walter joined the English barons against King John of England, who seized his lands in Huntingdonshire. Walter died in 1221. His widow was forced to marry Philip de Valognes in 1222 against her will.

== Marriage and issue ==
He married the heiress of Lamberton, they are known to have had the following issue:

- William I de Lindsay of Lamberton (died 1247), married Alice de Lancaster, had issue.
