= James Lindsay of Crawford (died 1395/6) =

Scottish nobleman (died 1395/6)

Sir James Lindsay
- Knight Banneret; Lord of Crawford
- Arms: Gules, a fess chequy argent and azure
- Predecessor: James Lindsay of Crawford
- Successor: David Lindsay, 1st Earl of Crawford
- Died: 1395/6
- Spouse: Margaret Keith (m.)

Sir James (de) Lindsay, 9th Lord of Crawford (died 1395/6), Knight Banneret, Lord of Crawford, Kirkmichael, Wigton, Symontoun, and of many other baronies, claiming also to be Lord of Buchan, was a Scottish feudal lord.

He was a constant witness to royal charters as nepos Regis. He sat in Parliament in 1371, and was one of those who sealed the Act of Settlement of the Crown on Robert II. He had many safe-conducts from King Richard II from 1374–1395, being styled Lord de Lindesay in the safe-conduct of 15 December 1381, and in 1394 was an ambassador with Sir David and others to England. He and his cousin Sir David of Glenesk obtained mutual charters of entail.

Sir James was Justiciar north of the Forth in 1373, also Sheriff of Lanark. He was present at Otterburn, and was taken prisoner by the Bishop of Durham, after having taken Sir Mathew Redman, all of which is described by Froissart. He was one of those who promoted the famous fight between the Clan Chattan and Clan Kay on the Inch of Perth, as a means of settling their feuds.

== Ancestry ==
James Lindsay was the only son of Sir James Lindsay, 8th Lord of Crawford, by his cousin Egidia, daughter of Walter, High Steward of Scotland, and half-sister of Robert II. The first known proprietor of Crawford, Lanarkshire was William Lindsay of Ercildoun (died c. 1200), Justiciary of Lothian 1189–98, and a party to the Treaty of 1174. By his wife Marjory, daughter of Henry, Prince of Scotland, and sister of William the Lion, he had three sons, Sir David de Lindsay of Crawford (died 1214), Justiciary of Lothian, Sir Walter of Lamberton, and William of Luffness. Sir David married Alice or Aleonora de Limesay or de Limési, coheiress of the barons of Wolverley. His son, also named Sir David, and also in 1235 Justiciary of Lothian, was on his death in 1241 succeeded by his brother Sir Gerard, on whose death in 1249 the estates passed to his sister Alice de Lindsay, wife of Sir Henry Prinkeney of Northamptonshire. In 1297 the Scottish estates, including Crawford, were bestowed by the Scottish nation on Sir Alexander de Lindsay of Luffness (fl. 1283–1309), great-grandson of William de Lindsay of Luffness; grandson of Sir David Lindsay, Lord of Brenwevil and the Byres, Justiciary of Lothian 1242–9, and a party to the treaty of 1244; and son of Sir David, who was chamberlain of Scotland in 1255, and is supposed to have died in the crusades in 1268. Sir Alexander was also High Chamberlain of Scotland under Alexander III. He was one of the barons who in 1296 swore fealty to Edward I, but soon afterwards joined Wallace. On 9 July 1297 he, however, swore fealty to Edward, (Note: Cal. Documents relating to Scotland, vol. ii. entry 909.) and at the same time became surety for Robert Bruce, Earl of Carrick. (Note: Cal. Documents relating to Scotland, vol. ii. entry 910.) On 31 August 1298 he received the lands of James, late Steward of Scotland. (Note: Documents illustrative of the Hist. of Scotland, ed. Stevenson, ii. 161.) Subsequently he, however, again joined the patriotic party, and he was one of those excepted by Edward in 13041470-14755 from the general pardon then proclaimed. He was one of the barons who in the convention of 1309 acknowledged Robert Bruce as sovereign. His son Sir David, described by Wyntoun as "true and of steadfast fay", was prisoner in the Castle of Devizes from April 1308 to November 1314, (Note: Cal. Documents relating to Scotland, iii. 188, 402.) when he was exchanged. Sir David was one of the nobles who in 1320 signed the letter to the Pope asserting the independence of Scotland. In 1346 he was appointed Keeper of Edinburgh Castle, and in 1349 and again in 1351 he was sent as commissioner to England to treat for the ransom of David II. By his wife Mary, coheiress of the Abernethies, he had four sons: David, killed at the Battle of Durham in 1346; Sir James, 8th Lord of Crawford; Sir William of Byres; and Sir Alexander, father of Sir David, 1st Earl of Crawford.

== Early life ==
Sir James, 9th Lord of Crawford, probably succeeded his father in 1357. He was present at the coronation of Robert II at Stirling, 26 March 1371. By the King he was made Sheriff of Lanark and also Justiciary north of the Forth. In 1371 and also in 1381 he was a commissioner to treat with England. On 4 November 1381, (Note: Exchequer Rolls, iii. 657.) not 1382 or 1383, as stated by different chroniclers, he, from jealousy of his influence with the King, slew Sir John Lyon of Glamis: a deed which originated an enduring feud between the Lyons and the Lindsays. Lindsay fled into exile, during which he made a pilgrimage to the shrine of St. Thomas à Becket at Canterbury, but ultimately, through the intervention of the Earls of Douglas and March, he was in 1383 recalled and pardoned. In the same year he accompanied the Earls of Moray and Douglas in an expedition into England.

== Battle of Otterburn ==
With other Lindsays Sir James fought under the Earl of Douglas at the Battle of Otterburn, 19 August 1388, and, as recorded by Froissart, was one of those who discovered Douglas when he lay dying of his wounds. Lindsay is probably the "lorde of Bowghan in armure bryght" of the old ballad on the Battle of Otterburn, and is mentioned in the Scotichronicon as "Lord of Crawford and Buchan". His adventures after the battle are recorded at length by Froissart. He had a personal encounter with Sir Matthew Redman, Governor of Berwick, who after his sword had been struck out of his hand yielded himself prisoner to Lindsay, and giving his word to return to Edinburgh by St. Michael's Day was allowed to proceed to Newcastle. During the same night Sir James and his squire lost their way on the heath, and on the following morning rode unawares into the midst of an English force under the Bishop of Durham, in the belief that they were friends, and were taken prisoners. Subsequently it was agreed that he should be exchanged for Sir Matthew Redman, and although intimation was sent by the King from Cambridge not to release him until further authority was given, (Note: Cal. Documents relating to Scotland, vol. iv. entry 384.) he was finally set at liberty.

== Later life ==
During his absence Robert de Keith had quarrelled with Lindsay's wife, who was his aunt, and had besieged her in her Castle of Fyvie, Aberdeenshire. Accordingly in 1395 Lindsay attacked and defeated Keith. Not long after Lindsay was sent with the Earl of Moray to settle the differences between the Clans Chattan and Kay, when it was finally arranged, as recorded by Wyntoun, and described in Scott's Fair Maid of Perth, that the dispute should be decided by a combat of thirty picked men from each clan before the King on the North Inch of Perth. Lindsay died some time before 22 April 1396. (Note: Exchequer Rolls, iii. 386.) Lindsay in 1392 founded a convent of Trinity Friars, Dundee, which subsequently became a hospital for decayed burgesses.

== Marriage and issue ==
He married Margaret, daughter of Sir William Keith, Great Marischal of Scotland (by Margaret Fraser) who is mentioned by Wyntoun as defending Fyvie Castle when besieged by her nephew in 1395. She survived her husband. Sir James left issue two daughters:—

1. Margaret, married to Sir Thomas Colville, (son and heir of Sir Robert Colville of Oxenham), who died in 1411.
2. Eufemia, married to Sir John Herries of Terregles.

These ladies inherited their father's lands, which he had not entailed, and the Ayrshire estate of Breneville thus left the Lindsays. On 12 June 1397 they sold their interest in Formartyn to Sir Henry de Prestoun, who built or added to the Castle of Fyvie.

As Sir James had no male issue, the barony of Crawford passed to his cousin-german, Sir David Lindsay of Glenesk, 1st Earl of Crawford.

== See also ==
- Clan Lindsay
- Clan Crawford
