= Mwaksy Mudenda =

British children's television presenter (born 1994)

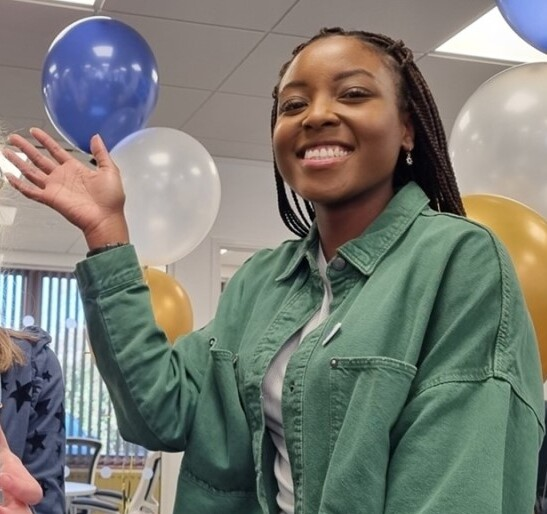
- Mudenda in 2022
- Born: 19 December 1994 (age 30); London, England
- Occupation: Television presenter
- Years active: 2018–present
- Known for: Blue Peter; Becoming Xtraordinary

Mwaka "Mwaksy" Mudenda (born 19 December 1994) is a British television presenter. Born in South London, she started out filming videos for social media, and was hired by the BBC to make sports content. She presented Blue Peter between 2020 and 2023, and she has also presented Becoming Xtraordinary.

== Life and career ==
Mudenda was born in South London on 19 December 1994 to a Zambian family and graduated with an anthropology degree from a Manchester university. She started YouTubing under the name Mwaksy in 2014 and working at MediaCityUK as an assistant producer for BBC Sport in 2018. Her job at the latter entailed making sports content relatable for younger audiences and filming videos for Instagram. A video she made for that platform, "Bust Down with Mwaksy", brought her to the attention of BBC Children's and Education, who invited her for a screen test.

Mudenda was announced as the 39th presenter of CBBC's Blue Peter in May 2020. Her first episodes were presented at home due to the first COVID-19 lockdown in the United Kingdom. While on the program, she, former Blue Peter presenter Sarah Greene, and numerous pupils from Wormholt Park primary school opened a 42-year old Blue Peter Time Capsule recovered from White City in 2022. She also produced language learning lessons in French, Spanish, and science.

Mudenda co-hosted Chester Zoo's 2022 Wildlife Connections Festival with Chantelle Lindsay. In 2023, it was announced that Mudenda would co-host Becoming Xtraordinary for Da Vinci, a streaming service, with Evan Edinger and Bear Grylls, during which she interviewed several celebrities including Julia Roberts, Roger Federer, Courteney Cox, Channing Tatum, and Olympic gold medallists and Nobel laureates. The show aired in May 2023.

Mudenda departed Blue Peter in September 2023, the third presenter to leave the program in 14 months, prompting suggestions that the program could be cancelled after 65 years. After a period with Lauren Layfield as guest host, she was replaced full-time in January 2024 by TikToker Shini Muthukrishnan. She subsequently presented the Barnardo's National Choral Competition in March 2024 and the Greater Manchester Health and Care Champion Awards in July 2025.

== Filmography ==
- Blue Peter (2020-2023)
- Crackerjack! (2021)
- Celebrity Mastermind (2021)
- Celebrity Catchpoint (2022)
- Celebrity Bridge of Lies (2022)
- Becoming Xtraordinary (2023)
- Celebrity Catchphrase (2024)
- Pointless Celebrities (2024)
