= John de Burdon =

Sir John de Burdon, acted as the Constable of Berwick Castle, the Sheriff of Berwick during 1298-1303.

== Biography ==
John was a knight from Nottinghamshire & Derbyshire. He was appointed keeper of Berwick Castle in 1298 in Scotland, which was the administrative centre as Sheriff of Berwick during the English administration of Scotland.
