= Robert Lindsey =

Robert Lindsey may refer to:

- Robert Lisle Lindsey (1917–1995), Israeli New Testament scholar
- Robert Lindsey (journalist) (1935–2025), author of the book The Falcon and the Snowman

== See also ==
- Robert Lindsay (disambiguation)
- Robert Linzee (1739–1804), officer of the Royal Navy
