= Mary Alice Powell Lindsay =

- Born: Mary Alice Powell; April 15, 1883; Granite, Utah Territory
- Died: February 12, 1979 (aged 95); Taylorsville, Utah
- Occupation: Nurse
- Spouse: Samuel J. Lindsay
- Children: 6

Mary Alice Powell Lindsay (April 15, 1883 – February 12, 1979) became the first registered nurse in Utah, United States. She studied at the LDS College, the Relief Society Home Nursing program, the Hospital Nurses Training School in Battle Creek, Michigan, and the University of Utah. She was a member of the Church of Jesus Christ of Latter-day Saints (LDS Church), participated in the Young Women Mutual Improvement Association (YWMIA), and volunteered for the Boy Scouts of America. She also helped organize a maternity hospital and health conferences in the state of Utah. She was an active member of the local Relief Society in the LDS Church.

== Early life ==
Mary Alice Powell was born April 15, 1883, in Granite, Utah Territory. Her family were members of the Latter-Day Saint Church. Her parents were Theodore Powell and Mary Ann Cunningham. Her parents had converted to the church in England and then moved to Salt Lake City. She was the fourth of their seven children. Her family moved to Wasatch Resort (in Little Cottonwood Canyon) because her father worked at the granite quarry for the Salt Lake Temple. He also owned the first set of encyclopedias in their community. Her father died before her seventh birthday, and after his death, the family moved back to Granite and later to Sandy, Utah. Her mother was later remarried to John Mattson. As a youth, Mary was involved with the YWMIA. She served as treasurer at age 14. She was also a literature teacher for the Relief Society at age 15.

== Education ==
After graduating the eighth grade, she attended the LDS College. She was called by the church to serve as a Relief Society missionary and enrolled in nursing classes. She studied for three years. She lived with Sarah Hanson and her family and helped out with housework. She graduated in June 1903 from the Relief Society Home Nurse Course and received a perfect score on her final exam. She was expected to stay and work for the organization to pay for the classes she had taken. She worked for six months at the LDS Hospital and worked with many women giving birth. She later accepted a position with the LDS Hospital, but felt torn between her career and her family. She furthered her education by taking classes under Dr. John T. Miller.

She was encouraged to attend the Battle Creek Sanitarium and Hospital Nurses Training School in Battle Creek, Michigan. She passed out three times while watching her first operation at the hospital. During this time of study, she could not attend church meetings. She graduated from the school in June 1910. She was also offered a position as the Surgical Division Supervisor that she declined to return home to Utah.

== Career ==
After returning to Utah, Powell found that there was not a record of registered nurses in Utah. She joined a committee to get more registered nurses in 1914. Because of her work, Powell became the first woman in the state of Utah to become a registered nurse. She returned to school for two years and attended the University of Utah from 1914 to 1915. She became the assistant superintendent of nurses at the LDS Hospital in 1916. She held that position for four years.

She met Samuel J. Lindsay while on a nursing call. They were married on June 14, 1916, in the Salt Lake Temple. The couple had six children (S. Powell, Mary, Ruth, Kenneth, Richard, and Grace). They built their home in Taylorsville. Shortly after her marriage, Mary was called by local church leaders to serve as a member of the Cottonwood Relief Society Stake Board. In this position, she helped organize the Cottonwood Maternity Hospital. She also organized Child Health Conferences in Murray, Utah. She worked with that organization as a volunteer. She also organized health conferences with the Utah State Board of Health during this time.

After the death of her husband and oldest son in 1932, Lindsay taught Red Cross classes and became a public health nurse in Salt Lake. She later became the PTA president of her children's school. She served as PTA president for three years. In 1951, she was diagnosed with "a tired heart" but regained strength. She officially retired in 1951 due to her health problems.

== Other contributions ==
Lindsay was called by church leaders to serve in various callings and responsibilities. She was a treasurer and a teacher of YWMIA at the local level. She was a merit badge counselor for the Boy Scouts of America in 1950. Lindsay traveled to Tonga to visit one of her sons. In 1965, she was nominated for the Utah Mother of the Year. She died on February 12, 1979, in Taylorsville.
