= Henry de Pinkeney =

13th century English noble

Arms of Baron Pinkney:Or, four fusils in fess gules.

Henry de Pinkeney (died 1254), Lord of Weden-Pinkeney, Fulmer and Datchet in England and Lord of Crawford in Scotland, was a 13th-century English noble.

Henry was the son of Robert de Pinkeney, Lord of Wedon-Pinkeney. He succeeded to his father's estates and titles upon the death of his father in 1234.

== Marriage and issue ==
Henry married Alice, daughter of David de Lindsay, Justiciar of Lothian in 1247 and Marjorie of Huntingdon, they are known to have had the following issue:

- Henry de Pinkeney, married Mary de Wahull, had issue.
- Alice de Pinkeney, married Ralph de Throp, had issue.
- Agnes de Pinkeney, married John de Wahull, had issue.
