= David Lindley =

David Lindley may refer to:

- David Lindley (musician) (1944–2023), American musician
- David Lindley (physicist) (born 1956), British theoretical physicist and author
- David Lindley (badminton), see 2009 All England Super Series – Mixed doubles

== See also ==
- David Armstrong-Jones, 2nd Earl of Snowdon, known professionally as David Linley
