= James Bannerman (theologian) =

Scottish theologian

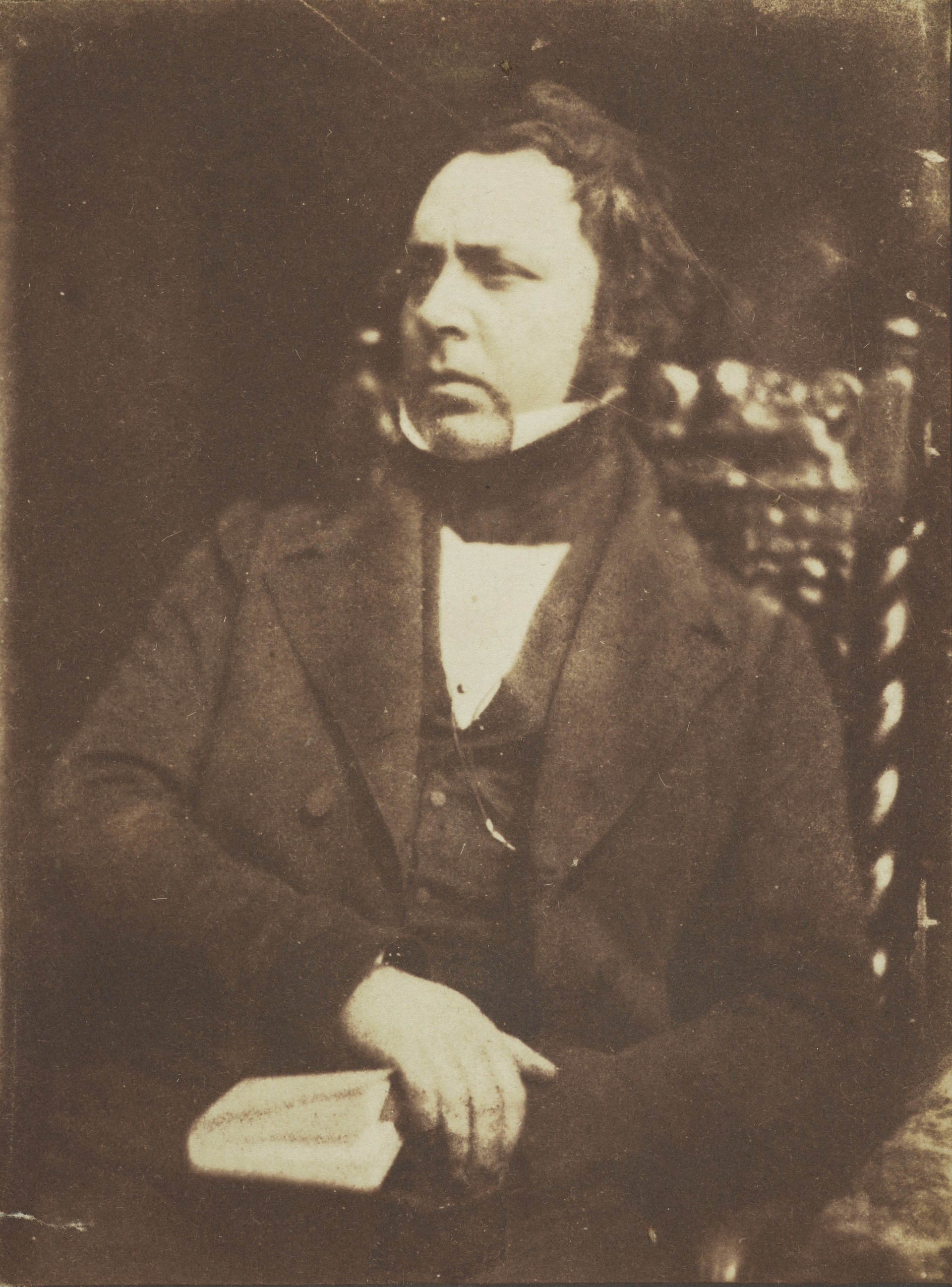
- photograph of Bannerman by David Octavius Hill & Robert Adamson c. 1843-1847
- Born: 9 April 1807; Cargill, Perthshire
- Died: 27 March 1868 (aged 60); Grange Cemetery, Edinburgh
- Education: University of Edinburgh, Princeton University
- Occupations: Pastor, Theologian
- Years active: mid 19th-century
- Notable work: The Church of Christ, Inspiration
- Theological work
- Tradition or movement: Free Church of Scotland (1843–1900)
- Main interests: Ecclesiology, Biblical inspiration

James Bannerman (9 April 1807 – 27 March 1868) was a Scottish theologian. He is best known for his classic work on Presbyterian ecclesiology, The Church of Christ.

== Life ==
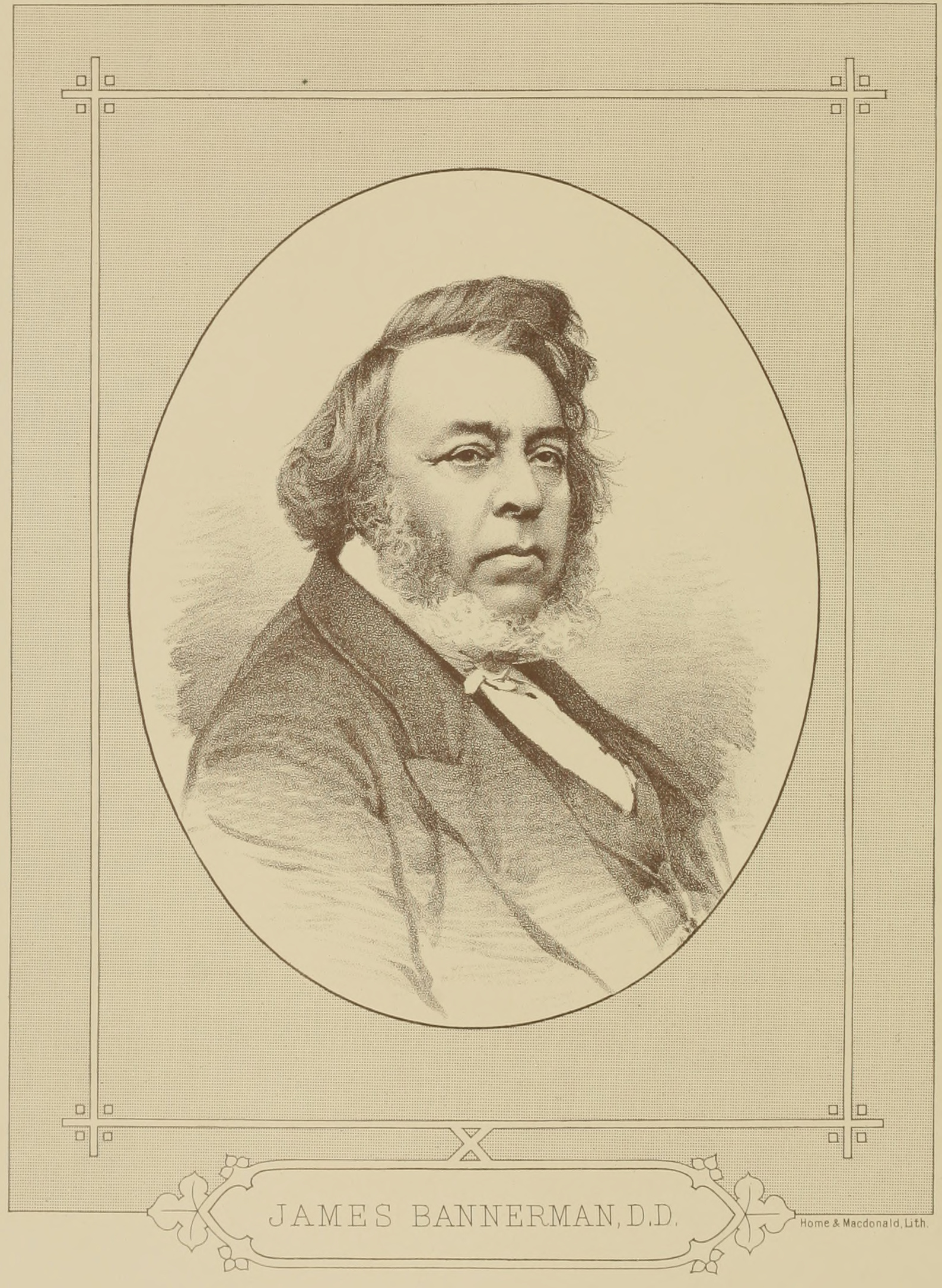
James Bannerman from Disruption Worthies

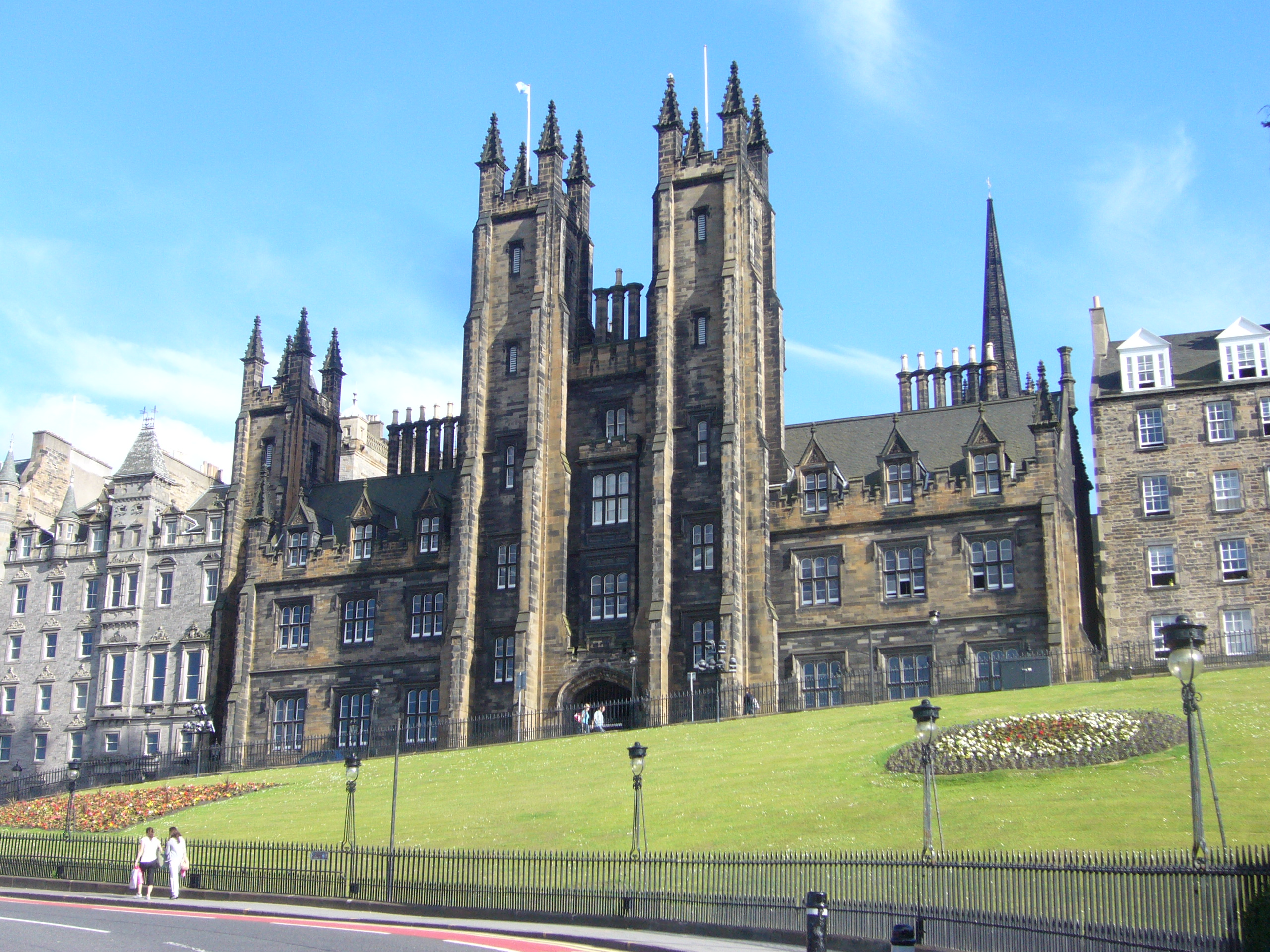
New College, Edinburgh, where Bannerman served as a professor

Bannerman was the son of James Patrick Bannerman, minister of Cargill, Perthshire. He was born at the manse of Cargill on 9 April 1807, and after a distinguished career at the University of Edinburgh, especially in the classes of Sir John Leslie and Professor Wilson, became minister of Ormiston, in Midlothian, in 1833, left the Established Church for the Free Church in 1843, and in 1849 was appointed professor of apologetics and pastoral theology in the New College, Edinburgh, which office he held till his death, 27 March 1868, at his home, 7 Clarendon Crescent, near Dean Bridge.

In 1850 he received the degree of D.D. from Princeton College, New Jersey. He took a leading part in various public movements, especially in that which led in 1843 to the separation of the free church from the state, and subsequently in the negotiations for union between the nonconformist presbyterian churches of England and Scotland.

== Works ==
His chief publications were:

- Letter to the Marquis of Tweeddale on the Church Question, 1840
- The Prevalent Forms of Unbelief, 1849
- Systematic Theology, 1851
- Apologetical Theology, 1851
- Inspiration: the Infallible Truth and Divine Authority of the Holy Scriptures, 1865
- The Church of Christ, also known as The Church: a Treatise on the Nature, Powers, Ordinances, Discipline, and Government of the Christian Church, 2 vols. 8vo; published after his death in 1868, and edited by his son
- A volume of sermons (also posthumous) published in 1869

Rosemary Mitchell asserts: "Bannerman published several theological works: one of the most significant, Inspiration: the Infallible Truth and Divine Authority of the Holy Scriptures (1865), was criticized by the theologian A. B. Davidson (1831–1902) for calling forth 'no opposition and no assent' (Drummond and Bulloch, 263). Nevertheless, it sounded a cautious retreat from the fundamentalism of Free Church orthodoxy, as Bannerman dissociated himself from the theory of verbal inspiration and accepted translations (and even paraphrases) as equally valid with the Greek and Hebrew scriptural originals."

== Family ==
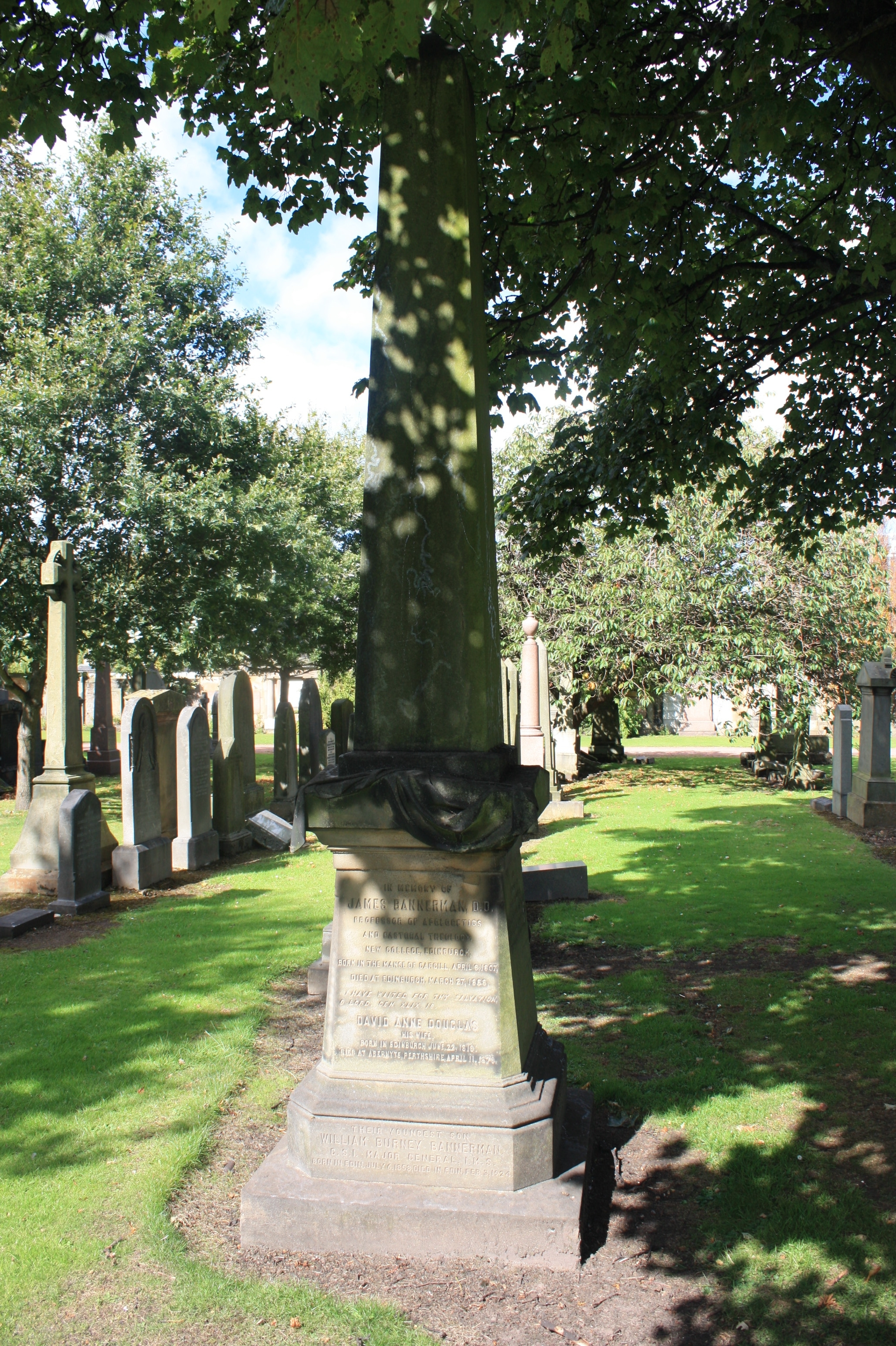
Bannerman's grave, Grange Cemetery, Edinburgh

In 1839 he married David (sic) Anne Douglas (1821–1879), a daughter of David Douglas, Lord Reston, one of the Senators of the College of Justice.

They had three sons and six daughters, including David Douglas Bannerman (b.1842) and James Patrick Bannerman. A third son, Major General William Burney Bannerman FRSE (1858–1924), married Helen Brodie Cowan Watson, daughter of Robert Boog Watson, and he and his wife are buried with the parents in the north-west section of the Grange Cemetery in Edinburgh.

He married 2 April 1839, David Anne (died 11 April 1879), daughter of David Douglas, Lord Reston, one of the Senators of the College of Justice, and had issue —

- David Douglas, D.D., min. of the Free Church, Dalkeith, and of St Leonard's Free Church, Perth, born 29 January 1842, died 5 April 1903
- Mary Turing Anne, born 30 May 1844
- Elizabeth Craigie, born 24 January 1846, died 12 January 1875
- Cecilia Helen, born 13 November 1847 (married John Crommelin Brown, I.C.S.)
- Anne Jessie, born 6 August 1850, died 9 August 1869
- Jemima Margaret, born 1852 (married August 1875, John Campbell Lorimer, K.C., Sheriff of Aberdeen)
- James Patrick, W.S., Edinburgh, born at Edinburgh 8 August 1854, died 3 May 1905
- William Burney, C.S.I., M.D., surgeon-general Madras, born 6 July 1858
- Catherine Maria, born 16 May 1861 (married William Alexander Mackay, M.D., Huelva, Spain), died 13 March 1898.
