= William I de Lindsay of Lamberton =

Scottish noble

William de Lindsay
- Lord of Lamberton and Molesworth
- Died: 1247
- Noble family: Lindsay family
- Father: Walter de Lindsay

William de Lindsay (died 1247), Lord of Lamberton and Molesworth, Fordington and Ulceby, Sheriff of Berwick was a Scottish noble, who held lands in Scotland and England.

== Life ==
Lindsay was a son of Walter de Lindsay of Lamberton. William was Sheriff of Berwick during his lifetime and was one of the barons who signed a letter alongside King Alexander II of Scotland in 1237 concerning the Treaty of York. He died in 1247.

== Marriages and issue ==
William married Alice, daughter of Gilbert fitz Roger fitz Reinfried and Helwise de Lancaster, they are known to have had the following issue:

- Walter II de Lindsay of Lamberton

He married secondly Marjory, Countess of Buchan, without issue.
