= Jim Lindsey (disambiguation) =

Jim Lindsey (1944–2026) was an American football player who was a running back in the National Football League.

Jim Lindsey may also refer to:

- Jim Lindsey (baseball) (1899–1963), American baseball player
- Jim Lindsey (Canadian football) (1948–1998), American football player who was a quarterback in the Canadian Football League
- Jim T. Lindsey (1926–2013) was an American politician in Texas

== See also ==
- James Lindsay (disambiguation)
