= Somerville Lindsay =

Irish Anglican priest and author

Thomas Somerville Lindsay (30 November 1854 – 6 September 1933) was an Anglo-Irish priest in the Church of Ireland and author.

Linney was born in Blackrock, County Cork. He was educated at Trinity College, Dublin and earned the Vice-Chancellor's Prize for English verse. He earned a Bachelor of Arts in 1878 and in 1880 earned a his Divinity Testimonium with first-class honours. In 1884, he earned his Master of Arts degree and in 1891 his Bachelor of Divinity.

In 1911, he married Sarah Elizabeth, the daughter of Rev. Thomas Twigg, Canon of St Patrick's Cathedral, Dublin.

He was ordained in 1879. After curacies in Enniscorthy and Bray he was Rector of Malahide with Portmarnock and St. Doulagh's Church, Fingal from 1899. In 1909, he became Canon of Christ Church Cathedral, Dublin. He Archdeacon of Dublin from 1918, retiring from his posts in 1926.

He died aged 78 at his home at St. Andrew's Church, Malahide, County Dublin.

An enthusiastic gardener, his writing topics included both religion and plants. Amongst others he wrote: "Healthy, Wealthy, and Wise", 1908; "The Church’s Song", 1920; Plant Names, 1923; "Sunlit Hours", 1927; "Some Archbishops of Dublin", 1929; "A Shortened Psalter", 1930; "What think ye of Christ?", 1931; and "From Gay to Grave", 1932; and Shrubs, 1933.
