= Malvina Lindsay =

American newspaper columnist and editor

- Undated photograph of Lindsay
- Born: September 13, 1893; Jackson County, Missouri
- Died: September 27, 1972 (aged 79)
- Resting place: Arlington National Cemetery
- Education: University of Missouri
- Occupations: Journalist, editor
- Employer: The Washington Post
- Spouse: Richard A. W. Pyles
- Awards: Honorary doctorate, Hood College

Malvina Lindsay Pyles (September 13, 1893 – September 27, 1972) was an American editor and columnist at The Washington Post. She was the paper's first women's page editor and the author of a satirical column, "The Gentler Sex". She was awarded an honorary doctorate from Hood College in 1953.

== Early life ==
Malvina Lindsay was born on September 13, 1893, in Jackson County, Missouri, near Kansas City. She attended the University of Missouri, earning a degree in journalism in 1913. She was later inducted into the university's hall of fame.

== Career ==
In 1913, Lindsay began her career working for the Kansas City Post. After the Kansas City Journal bought the Post, she wrote for the merged paper, the Kansas City Journal-Post. She became the first woman's page editor of The Washington Post in 1934. Under her supervision the section became a model used by journalism schools. In 1943, she became a columnist full-time, and was particularly known for her satire column, "The Gentler Sex", which she sometimes wrote in verse. In 1946, Lindsay transferred to the Post's editorial page, where her column was called "Of Human Affairs". The News (Frederick, Maryland) said her work there "reveals a shrewd and deep understanding of the human mind and the foibles to which it is subject".

In 1933, the University of Missouri awarded her a medal for distinguished service in journalism. The citation honored "her thoroughness of preparation, accuracy and intelligence in her years of newspaper interviews." In 1951, the national honor society for women educators, Delta Kappa Gamma, appointed her an honorary member in recognition of her editorial writing on education. Hood College awarded her an honorary Doctor of Letters in 1953.

== Personal life and death ==
Lindsay was married to Richard A. W. Pyles but wrote under her maiden name. They remained married until his death on October 3, 1948, at their home at 2141 Eye Street NW, Washington.

Lindsay died in September 27, 1972, in Washington, DC. She was 79. She was buried on October 2, 1972 at Arlington National Cemetery.
