= Mark F. Lindsay =

American lawyer (born 1963)

Mark Frederick Lindsay (born May 24, 1963) served as U.S. president Bill Clinton's assistant to the president for the Office of Management and Administration. During this period he oversaw White House administration and operations, including controversy related to missing White House emails, and later served on the presidential transition team at the end of the Clinton presidency.

== Career ==
Lindsay joined the Executive Office of the President in 1997, serving as general counsel for the Office of Administration before his promotion to director of the Administration Office in December 1998.

From 1999 to 2001 Lindsay was appointed to assistant to the president for management and administration. _{2} As the chief operations, chief financial, and chief information technology officer, the assistant to the president for management and administration (M&A) leads the White House's largest office with a staff of over 2,500 and managed a budget in excess of $1 billion annually. This role reports directly to the president and the president's chief of Staff. Among Lindsay's areas of responsibility were the White House Military Office (e.g., Air Force One, the White House Communications Agency, the Medical Unit and Camp David), and the White House Operations and Executive Office of the President's Office of Administration (e.g., finance, information systems, human resources, legal/appropriations and security). Lindsay managed the financing of Presidential political activities with Democratic organizations, including the Democratic National Committee and its Chairman. _{1}

Upon leaving the White House Lindsay became president of AARP Pharmacy Services and vice president of public communications and strategy for UnitedHealth Group, a diversified health and "well-being" company, and in 2008 was hired by Washington, D.C. lobbying firm The Livingston Group, headed by former Congressman Robert L. Livingston, as director of the health care and pharmaceuticals practice. _{3}

== Education ==
Lindsay graduated from Macalester College in St. Paul, Minnesota, with double majors in economics and business, and classical civilization and archaeology. He obtained a law degree from Case Western Reserve University School of Law, graduated with a master's degree with a concentration in international affairs from Georgetown University, and graduated from the Advanced Management program at the University of Pennsylvania's Wharton Business School. He is a member of the District of Columbia Bar.

== Personal life ==
Lindsay is a native of Cleveland, Ohio. He and his wife, Carla, and their two boys, reside in Potomac, Maryland.
