= Chantelle Lindsay =

English wildlife conservationist and TV presenter

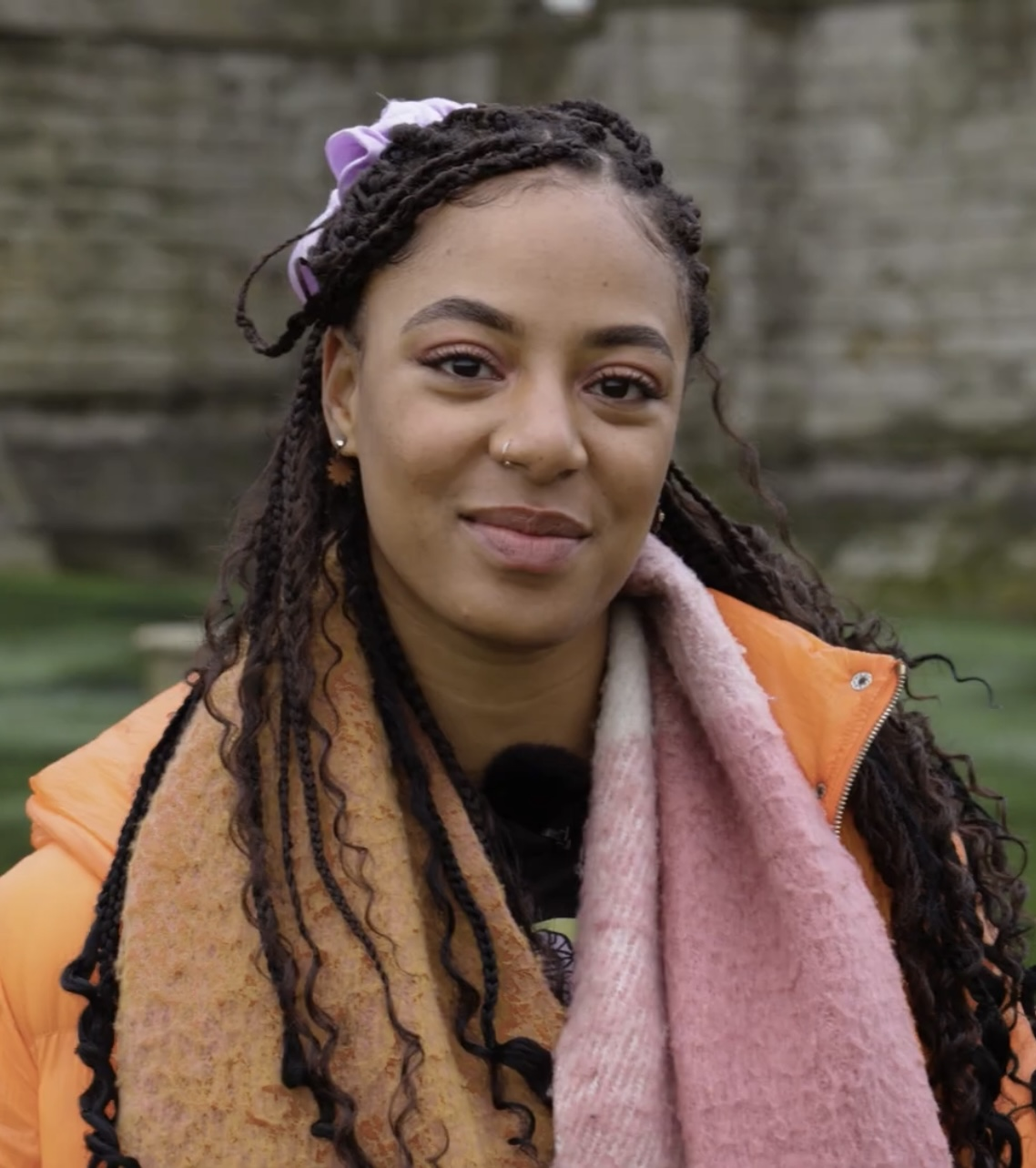
- Lindsay in 2024
- Born: Chantelle Shikira Lindsay; 1994 (age 31–32); Doncaster, England
- Education: University of Wolverhampton
- Years active: 2018–present

Chantelle Shikira Lindsay (born 1994) is an English wildlife conservationist and television presenter.

== Early life ==
Lindsay was born in Doncaster, South Yorkshire. Her interest in wildlife began at a young age; she had a safari-themed bedroom in her early childhood and recalls her parents hosting events in their garden in Doncaster. They were "always lucky enough to have a garden" despite moving often. As a teenager, Lindsay became inspired to pursue conservation as a career. She went on to graduate from the University of Wolverhampton in 2016 with a degree in Animal Behaviour and Wildlife Conservation.

== Career ==
Through the "Keeping It Wild" youth trainee scheme, which she completed in summer 2019, Lindsay was hired by the London Wildlife Trust (LWT), where she worked as an officer on the Great North Wood project. After making YouTube videos for the Wildlife Trust, she was invited onto the BBC children's and wildlife programmes Blue Peter and Springwatch respectively. Lindsay later coordinated the Trust's Nature in Mind project.

In 2021, Lindsay began co-hosting the CBeebies series Teeny Tiny Creatures with Rory Crawford. She also appeared in Prince William's documentary A Planet for Us All on ITV and Discovery+.

Lindsay co-hosted Chester Zoo's 2022 Wildlife Connections Festival with Mwaka Mudenda. She was a presenter on the BBC Proms tour Ocean Adventure.

To celebrate 30 years of the National Lottery Heritage Fund, Lindsay was one of seven Game Changers honoured in an art installation at Whitby Abbey. She also sat on the judges panel of the 2024 Royal Society Young People's Book Prize alongside the likes of Emily Grossman, Dorothy Bishop, and Emrys Evans.
