= Rod Lindsay =

Canadian psychologist (born 1946)

Roderick Cameron Lodge Lindsay
- Born: December 30, 1946 (age 79)
- Other name: Rod Lindsay
- Education: University of Alberta
- Scientific career
- Fields: Psychology
- Workplaces: Queen's University at Kingston

Roderick Cameron Lodge Lindsay (born December 30, 1946) is a Canadian psychologist who studied psychology and law, and was a leading expert on eyewitness memory. Lindsay was an Emeritus Professor at Queen's University, Canada.

Lindsay created a research program that investigated the factors that influence the accuracy of eyewitness identification. He also looked at the belief of eyewitness testimony. In later years, Lindsay's studied identification and courtroom procedures for child witnesses. He also researched and developed procedures for the police and the courts to obtain and evaluate eyewitness evidence.

== Education ==
In 1974, Lindsay received his bachelor's degree at the University of Toronto. Lindsay obtained his master's degree in 1978 and his PhD in 1982 from the University of Alberta.

As a social psychologist during his graduate training, Lindsay worked in the areas of aggression and attribution.

== Career ==
Lindsay worked as a professor in the Department of Psychology at Queen's University from 1982 until his retirement. He was an assistant professor from 1982 to 1986, an associate professor from 1986 to 1996, and a full professor from 1996.

Lindsay received many grants in his career to study eyewitness memory. including a has received $100,000 to study how to reduce wrongful convictions from 2004 to 2009. (Note: Lindsay, R. C. L. (2010). Curriculum vitae. Retrieved from https://www.queensu.ca/psychology/ People/Faculty/Roderick-Lindsay/Curriculum-Vitae/Rod_Lindsay_CV_2010_FINAL.pdf.)

Lindsay testified as an expert on eyewitness issues in criminal cases and civil cases on three different continents. He also consulted with individual police departments on identification procedures. In 2002, he provided training to Canadian judges on eyewitness identification. The training was developed by the National Judicial Institute and, by the end of 2004, Lindsay had trained about 65% of the criminal court justices in Canada. Lindsay was a member of the Technical Working Group for Eyewitness Evidence and helped develop and write the American national guidelines for obtaining and preserving eyewitness evidence. He also worked on training materials to accompany the Eyewitness Evidence: A Guide for Law Enforcement.

Lindsay was a consultant for one of the United Nations war crime trails for Rwanda over genocide. He was asked by the United Nations prosecutors to consult with them when the defense called an expert witness to testify. During June and July 1998, he read e-mailed transcripts of the witness's testimony and provided the prosecutors comments and suggested questions for their cross-examination. In September 1998, he was called to testify in Arusha, Tanzania.

Lindsay is a member of the American Psychologist Association, the American Psychology-Law Society, and the Society for Applied Research in Memory and Cognition.

== Research interests and areas of study ==
=== Eyewitness accuracy ===
Lindsay carried out research into the factors that influence eyewitness.

He studied the differences between simultaneous lineup presentations and sequential lineup presentations, demonstrating that the type of lineup affects the accuracy of eyewitness memory. The results showed that people are better at identifying a suspect if they are present in a simultaneous lineup than a sequential lineup. However, when a suspect isn't present, sequential lineups are more accurate. (Note: Steblay, N., Dysart, J., Fulero, S., & Lindsay, R. C. L. (2001). Eyewitness accuracy rates in sequential and simultaneous lineup presentations: A meta-analytic comparison. Law & Human Behavior. 25, 459-473.)

Lindsay has also researched the influence that age has on the accuracy of eyewitness memory. (Note: Pozzulo, J. D. & Lindsay, R. C. L. (1998). Identification accuracy of children versus adults: Ameta-analysis. Law & Human Behavior, 22, 549-570.) Many researchers, including Lindsay have found that children have little to no accuracy in making correct rejections in facial recognition studies (i.e., when the suspect is absent, children are much more likely to mistakenly identify an innocent person).

Lindsay and Wei-Jen Ng found that there is no "cross-race effect" for facial recognition of races that the eyewitness isn't familiar with. (Note: Ng, W. J., & Lindsay, R.C.L. (1994). Cross-race facial recognition: Failure of the contact hypothesis. Journal of Cross-Cultural Psychology, 25, 217-232.) However, other studies show facial recognition and race play a role in influencing eyewitness accuracy. For example, a study by Steblay et al. (2003) showed false identification was much higher when an innocent suspect closely resembled the culprit. (Note: Steblay, N., Dysart, J. E., Fulero, S., & Lindsay, R.C.L. (2003). Eyewitness accuracy rates in police showup and lineup presentations: A meta-analytic comparison. Law & Human Behavior, 27, 523-540.)

=== Children's eyewitness memory ===
Another area of interest for Lindsay was children's eyewitness memory. Traditionally, children are not viewed as competent witnesses compared to adults and are often viewed as less reliable and less accurate. Pozzulo and Lindsay consider the accuracy of children's eyewitness memory and explored procedures to be used with child witnesses in the courtroom.

The studies found that preschoolers (4 years of age) were less likely than adults to make correct identifications; however, children over the age of 5 did not considerably differ from adults. On the other hand, children of all ages, including adolescents, were less likely than adults to correctly reject a target-absent lineup. In addition, sequential lineups resulted in greater differences between children and adults for correct rejections compared to simultaneous lineups. Puzzulo and Lindsay also explored courtroom procedures that can be used with children to increase the accuracy of their eyewitness testimony. In adults, sequential lineups aid in correct rejection target-absent lineups; however, they do not help children but actually result in fewer correct rejections. The results also showed that, even with identification practice/training, a child witnesses’ correct rejection rates did not increase.

=== Procedures used by police and courtrooms ===
Lindsay's research contributed to police and courtroom procedures, including the way in which police lineups are conducted (sequential or simultaneous), strategies for choosing lineup fillers, the relationship between eyewitnesses confidence and their accuracy. (Note: Wells, G., Malpass, R.S., Lindsay, R.C.L., Fisher, R.P., Turtle, J.W., & Fulero, S.M. (2000), From the lab to the police station: A successful application of eyewitness research. American Psychologist, 55, 581-598.)

Lindsay and Gary Wells developed a sequential lineup procedure in which culprits are presented to the eyewitness one at a time rather than simultaneously. Sequential presentation was intended to reduce eyewitness reliance on relative judgment, in which they decide who looks most like the culprit. In sequential lineups, eyewitnesses are forced to decide whether or not the lineup member is the perpetrator before viewing the next lineup member. Lindsay and Wells’ data showed that, when the culprit was present, simultaneous and sequential procedures produced very similar correct identification rates. However, when the culprit was absent, the rate of mistaken identifications was significantly higher for the simultaneous lineups than sequential lineups.

In addition to sequential lineups, Lindsay's research suggested 3 other ways in which police lineups could be improved: ensuring that all line up participants resemble each other, all participants wear similar clothes, and police directions "avoid biases and slips of the tongue that may influence the person".

== Publications ==
Lindsay has published a number of books and articles, including:

=== Books ===
- Handbook of Eyewitness Psychology: Memory for People (2007)
- Handbook of Eyewitness Psychology: Memory for Events (2007

=== Articles ===
- Eyewitness Accuracy Rates in Police Showup and Lineup Presentations: A Meta-Analytic Comparison
- Eyewitness Accuracy Rates in Sequential and Simultaneous Lineup Presentations: A Meta-Analytic Comparison
- Identification Accuracy of Children Versus Adults: A Meta-Analysis and
- Cross-Race Facial Recognition: Failure of the Contact Hypothesis.
- Lindsay, R. C. L., Bertrand, M. I., & Smith, A. M. (2017). The importance of knowing how a person became the suspect in a lineup: Multiple eyewitness identification procedures increase the risk of wrongful conviction. Manitoba Law Journal, 40(3), 53-83.
