= Granite, Utah =

- CDP
- Little Cottonwood Canyon in Granite

- Location in Salt Lake County and the state of Utah.
- Coordinates: 40°34′16″N 111°48′34″W
- Country: United States
- State: Utah
- County: Salt Lake

Area
  - Total: 1.5 sq mi (3.8 km^{2})
  - Land: 1.5 sq mi (3.8 km^{2})
  - Water: 0 sq mi (0.0 km^{2})
- Elevation: 5,131 ft (1,564 m)

Population (2020)
  - Total: 1,076
  - Density: 730/sq mi (280/km^{2})
- Time zone: UTC-7 (Mountain (MST))
  - Summer (DST): UTC-6 (MDT)
- ZIP codes: 84070, 84092
- Area codes: 385, 801
- FIPS code: 49-30900
- GNIS feature ID: 1428314

Granite is a census-designated place (CDP) in Salt Lake County, Utah, United States, adjoining the City of Sandy on the east. As of the 2020 census, the CDP population was 1,076, a decrease from the 2010 population of 1,932. Salt Lake County has designated a Granite “Community Council” for purposes of planning and development. The Granite Community Council includes the area within the CDP as well as the rest of Little Cottonwood Canyon, extending to Snowbird and Alta. In 2009 there was an effort to make Granite a township that ultimately failed.

== History ==
Granite began as the site of the stone quarry for the Salt Lake Temple in 1859. By 1877 there were also several farmers in the area and an LDS ward was organized.

== Geography ==
According to the United States Census Bureau, the CDP has a total area of 1.5 square miles (3.8 km^{2}), all land. The majority of the land extends into Little Cottonwood Canyon.

== Demographics ==
As of the census of 2000, there were 2,018 people, 609 households, and 537 families residing in the CDP. The population density was 1,374.0 people per square mile (530.0/km^{2}). There were 642 housing units at an average density of 437.1/sq mi (168.6/km^{2}). The racial makeup of the CDP was 95.29% White, 0.59% African American, 0.30% Native American, 1.59% Asian, 0.35% Pacific Islander, 0.64% from other races, and 1.24% from two or more races. Hispanic or Latino of any race were 1.83% of the population.

There were 609 households, out of which 43.7% had children under the age of 18 living with them, 78.8% were married couples living together, 5.4% had a female householder with no husband present, and 11.8% were non-families. 8.7% of all households were made up of individuals, and 2.3% had someone living alone who was 65 years of age or older. The average household size was 3.31 and the average family size was 3.51.

Historical population
| Census | Pop. | Note | %± |
|---|---|---|---|
| 2000 | 2,197 | | — |
| 2010 | 1,932 | | −12.1% |
| 2020 | 1,076 | | −44.3% |

In the CDP, the population was spread out, with 28.5% under the age of 18, 11.1% from 18 to 24, 22.4% from 25 to 44, 31.2% from 45 to 64, and 6.7% who were 65 years of age or older. The median age was 37 years. For every 100 females, there were 109.3 males. For every 100 females age 18 and over, there were 103.5 males.

The median income for a household in the CDP was $108,343, and the median income for a family was $109,496. Males had a median income of $67,188 versus $35,588 for females. The per capita income for the CDP was $40,098. None of the families and 0.9% of the population were living below the poverty line, including no under eighteens and none of those over 64.

== See also ==
- List of census-designated places in Utah
