= Alwyn Lindsay =

Australian rules footballer

Personal information
- Born: 4 June 1923
- Died: 24 August 2001 (aged 78)
- Original team: Geelong West
- Height: 168 cm (5 ft 6 in)
- Weight: 66 kg (146 lb)

Playing career^{1}
Years	Club	Games (Goals)
1945–1947	Geelong	31 (2)
- ^{1} Playing statistics correct to the end of 1947.

Alwyn Lindsay (4 June 1923 – 24 August 2001) was an Australian rules footballer who played with Geelong in the Victorian Football League (VFL).

Lindsay, a utility, played 31 league games for Geelong, from 1945 to 1947.

He captain-coached Geelong West in the 1950 Ballarat Football League season.
