= William de Lindsay of Luffness =

Scottish noble

William de Lindsay
- Noble family: Lindsay family
- Father: William de Lindsay
- Mother: Alice de Limési

William de Lindsay (c.1179 – c.1238), was a 12th-13th century Scottish noble.

Lindsay was a younger son of William de Lindsay and Alice de Limési. He was Steward to the High Steward of Scotland.

== Marriage and issue ==
He had the following known issue:

- David de Lindsay of Barnweill
- William de Lindsay
