= Mayne Lindsay =

British novelist

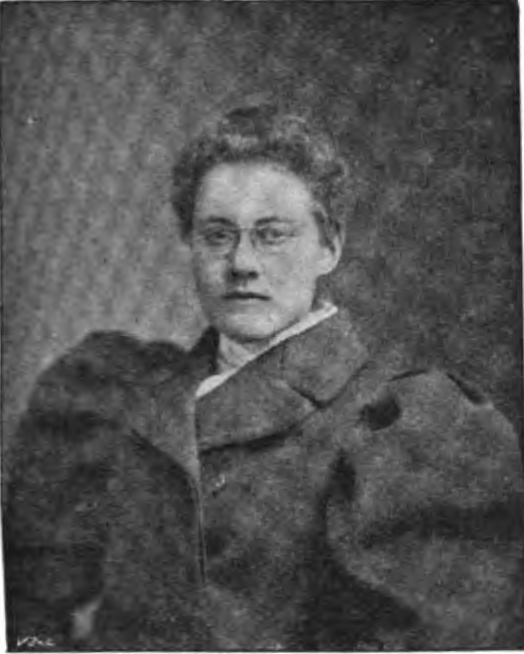
- Born: 1873; London
- Died: 3 May 1955 (aged 81–82); Hindhead
- Occupation: Novelist
- Spouse(s): Arthur Wellesley Clarke

Rosina Margaret Hopkins Clarke (1873 – 3 May 1955) was a British author who used the pseudonym Mayne Lindsay.

Rosina Margaret Hopkins was born on 1873 in London, the daughter of David Hopkins, a British consul serving in Africa. In her early life she spent three years in India, where her brother was a judge, and a year on a sheep farm in Australia. She married Sir Arthur Wellesley Clarke CBE, a naval captain, in 1897 and they had two children.

She began publishing stories while a teenager, and her travels provided themes and settings for her fiction. Her The Valley of Sapphires is a collection of stories about India. Her novel Prophet Peter is about a man with the power of second sight who gains a large following. Her story "The Little Pale Man" was adapted for the stage by Frederick Fenn as The Nelson Touch (1907). Of her pseudonym, she said "I have enjoyed the shelter of a pen-name against myself, and I have liked to fancy that by its help 'Mayne Lindsay' might be enabled to do things I was sure the familiar 'I' could never accomplish."

Mayne Lindsay died on 3 May 1955 at a nursing home in Hindhead.

== Bibliography ==
- The Valley of Sapphires. 1 vol. London: Ward, Lock, 1899.
- The Whirligig. 1 vol. London: Ward, Lock, 1901.
- Prophet Peter: A Study in Delusions. 1 vol. London: Ward, Lock, 1902.
- The Antipodians: A Romance, 1904
- The Bounty of the River, 1904
- The Byways of Empire, 1904
- The King of Kerisal, 1907.
