= David Lindley (physicist) =

British theoretical physicist and author

- Born: 4 December 1956 (age 69)
- Education: Cambridge University
- Scientific career
- Fields: Physics
- Workplaces: Cambridge University; Fermi National Accelerator Laboratory

David Lindley (born 4 December 1956) is a British theoretical physicist and author. He holds a B.A. in theoretical physics from Cambridge University (1975–1978) and a PhD in astrophysics from the University of Sussex (1978–1981). Then he was a postdoctoral researcher at Cambridge University. From 1983 to 1986, he was a research fellow in the Theoretical Astrophysics Group at the Fermi National Accelerator Laboratory. He then served as technical editor and writer with the Central Design Group for the Superconducting Supercollider at the Lawrence Berkeley Laboratory in Berkeley, California. He was an associate editor at Nature (1987–1993), a Senior Editor of Science (1994–1995), and an associate editor of Science News (1996–2000). Since 2000, he has been a freelance science writer and consultant.

Lindley is known for writing entertaining scientific texts that show not only great knowledge of physics, but also a wit and understanding of what the layman can grasp. Most of his books explain the scientific theories through the use of a scientist's biography or an historical account of disagreement amongst scientists.

In The End of Physics, Lindley challenged the assumption that string theorists might achieve a unified theory. He contended that particle physics was in danger of becoming a branch of aesthetics, since these theories could be validated only by subjective criteria, such as elegance and beauty, rather than through experimentation.

== Selected books ==
- The end of physics: the myth of a unified theory. BasicBooks. 1993. ISBN 978-0-465-01548-1.
- Where Does the Weirdness Go: Why Quantum Mechanics is Strange, But not as Strange as You Think, Basic Books (1996), ISBN 0-465-06785-9; Lindley, David (2008). pbk edition. Basic Books. ISBN 9780786725878.
- Boltzmann's Atom: The Great Debate that Launched a Revolution in Physics. Free Press. 2001. ISBN 978-0-684-85186-0. Lindley, David (2015). pbk reprint. Simon and Schuster. ISBN 9781501142673.
- Degrees Kelvin: A Tale of Genius, Invention, and Tragedy. Washington, D.C.: Joseph Henry Press. 2004. ISBN 978-0-309-09073-5.
- Uncertainty: Einstein, Heisenberg, Bohr, and the Struggle for the Soul of Science. Anchor Books. 2008. ISBN 978-0-307-38948-0.
- The Dream Universe: How Fundamental Physics Lost Its Way. Knopf Doubleday Publishing Group. 2020. ISBN 978-0-385-54385-9.
