= Robert de Lindsay =

Scottish noble

- Noble family: Lindsay family
- Father: Walter de Lindsay

Robert de Lindsay, Lord of Locherwood, was a 12th-century Scottish noble.

Robert was a son of Walter de Lindsay. His elder brother was William de Lindsay, Lord of Ercildum, Crawford, Baron of Luffness and Justiciar of Lothian. Not much is known of Richard. The lands of Locherwood were passed by his great-granddaughter Margaret, heiress of Locherwood to the Hay family.
