= David Douglas, Lord Reston =

Scottish judge (1769–1819)

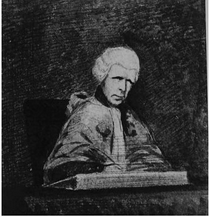
David Douglas, Lord Reston by Robert Scott Moncrieff.

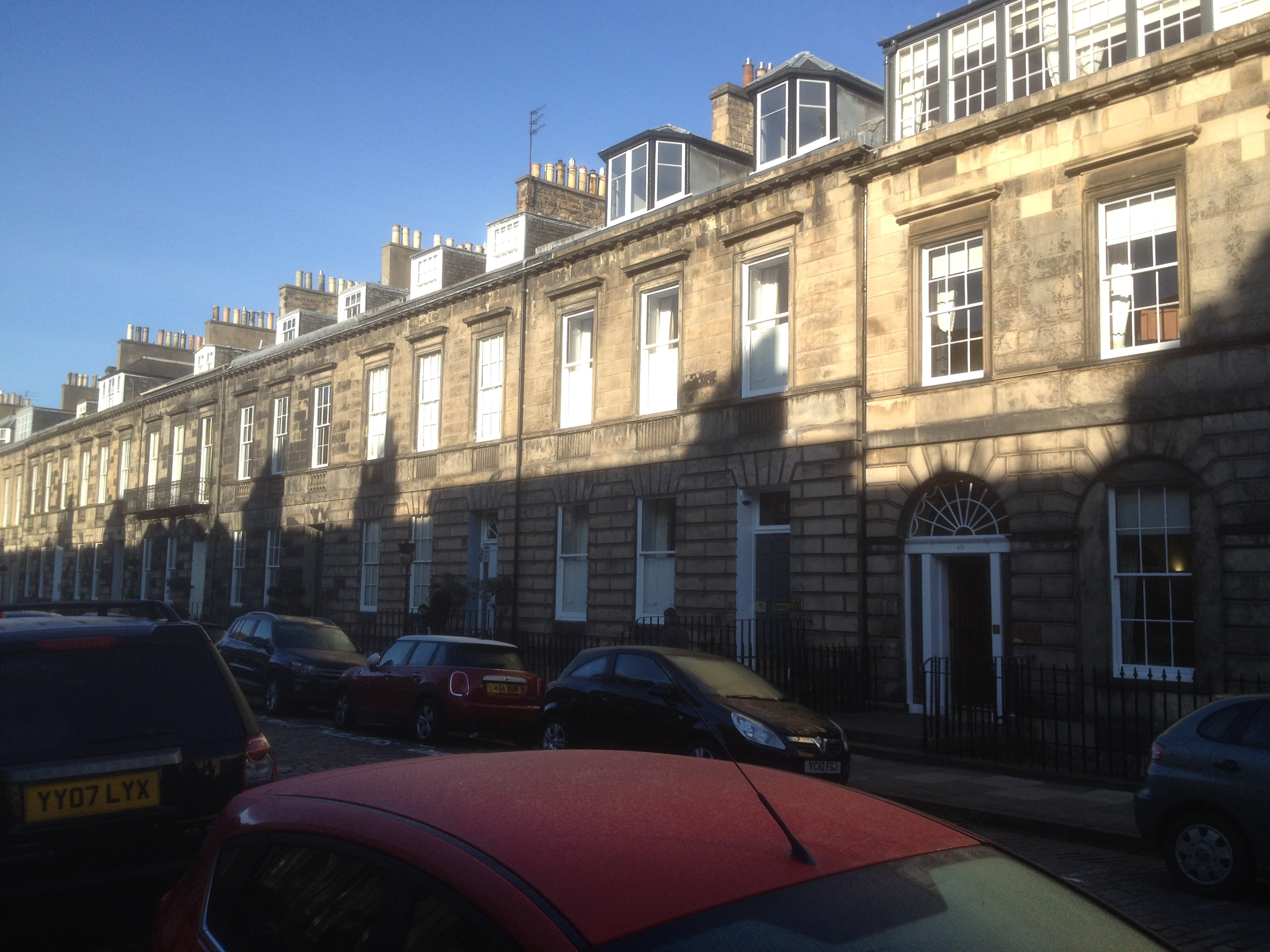
Northumberland Street, Edinburgh, home to Lord Reston

Hon David Douglas, Lord Reston FRSE (24 July 1769 – 23 April 1819) was a Scottish judge who was a cousin and heir of Adam Smith.

== Life ==
He was born on 24 July 1769, in Strathendry, the fifth and youngest son of Cecilia Craigie, daughter of Robert Craigie, Lord President of the Court of Session, and Col. Robert Douglas of Strathendry (1716–1803). He spent his later childhood with Adam Smith, who was a first cousin of his father, and received Smith's property, including his library, on his death.

He attended Edinburgh High School (with Sir Walter Scott), 1777–1782, and then the University of Edinburgh, where he studied under Millar. It is set down in the History of the Speculative Society that he read a paper there on 30 November 1790 on "The Effects of Taxation on the Necessaries of Life." He qualified as an Advocate in 1791, and became Sheriff-Depute of Berwickshire in 1809. In 1813 he succeeded William Craig, Lord Craig as Lord of Session 1813, and in 1816 he succeeded Lord Meadowbank as Lord of Justiciary, at which point he adopted the title Lord Reston. He was also a Senator of the Royal College of Justice.

In 1790, on the death of his father's cousin, Adam Smith, he inherited his vast and valuable library of books.

In January 1817 he was elected a Fellow of the Royal Society of Edinburgh. His proposers were David Hume, Thomas Charles Hope, and James Russell. His Edinburgh townhouse address at this time was 51 Northumberland Street in the New Town.

He operated what was called the Northern Circuit (of Scottish courts) in conjunction with Lord Gillies.

He died at the Glendoick estate near Perth on 23 April 1819 while visiting his father-in-law, Major John Craigie, just prior to a planned trip to visit Lord Kinnaird in his recently completed house, Rossie Priory. On Thursday 27 April he was buried in the burial ground of his father's cousin Adam Smith in Canongate Kirkyard on the Royal Mile in Edinburgh.

== Family ==
In 1805 he married Elizabeth Craigie, his first cousin, and they had four children:

1. Elizabeth Craigie Douglas (1808–22)

2. Cecilia Margaret Douglas (1813–98), who married the Rev. William Bruce Cunningham; amongst their children were Robert Oliver Cunningham and David Douglas Cunningham

3. Adam Smith Douglas (1816–38)

4. David Anne Douglas (1819–79), who married the Rev James Bannerman, whose son was Rev David Douglas Bannerman
