= Sheriff of Berwick =

The Sheriff of Berwick was historically a royal official, who was responsible for enforcing justice in Berwickshire, Scotland. Prior to 1748 most sheriffdoms were held on a hereditary basis. From that date, following the Jacobite uprising of 1745, the hereditary sheriffs were replaced by salaried sheriff-deputes, qualified advocates who were members of the Scottish Bar.

The sheriffdom was merged into the new sheriffdom of Haddington and Berwick in 1856.

== Sheriffs of Berwick ==
- Norman (1147)
- Walter de Lindsay (1206)
- Robert of Upsettlington (1220)
- Ingram de Balliol (1228)
- William de Lindsay (c. 1230)
- David de Graham (1236)
- John Maxwell
- David de Graham (1264)
- Hugh de Berkeley (1266)
- John de Soulis (1288)
- William Lindsay
- Richard Fraser
- Osbert of Spaldington (1295-1297)
- John de Burdon (1300-1302)
- Edmund Hastings, 1st Baron Hastings (1312)
- John FitzWalter, 2nd Baron FitzWalter (1325)
- Hugh Gifford (1329)
- Robert Lauder (1330)
- John I Preston, Baron of Craigmillar (c. 1420)
- Patrick Nesbit (1437)
- Walter de Halyburton
- John de Halyburton (1447)
  - Alexander Hume (1447) - Deputy
- Patrick Hepburn of Dunsyre (1450)
- Adam Hepburn, Master of Hailes (1470)
- Patrick Hepburn, 1st Earl of Bothwell (1480)
- Adam Hepburn, 2nd Earl of Bothwell (1511)
- Alexander French, (son of Adam French 8th Laird of Thornydykes) (1584 - 1594)
- Patrick Hume, Earl of Marchmont (1690–1710)
- Alexander, Earl of Home (1710-1715)
- Patrick Hume, Earl of Marchmont (1715-1724)
- Alexander, Earl of Marchmont (1724-)
- Adam French, (son of Adam French 8th Laird of Thornydykes) 1584 - 1594

Sheriffs-Depute

- George Ker, 1755– (first Sheriff-depute of modern era)
- David Hume of Ninewells, 1783–1793 (Sheriff of Linlithgow, 1793–1811)
- John Swinton, 1793–1809
- David Douglas of Reston, 1809–1813
- William Boswell, <1819–1840
- Robert Bell 1841–1856 (Sheriff of Haddington and Berwick, 1856)
- For sheriffs after 1856 see Sheriff of Haddington and Berwick

== See also ==
- Historical development of Scottish sheriffdoms
