= Jimmy Lindsay (footballer, born 1958) =

Scottish footballer

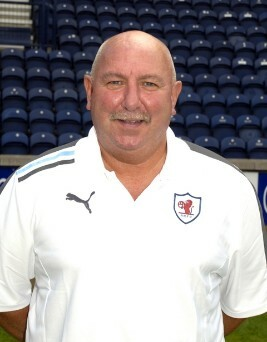
- Lindsay in 2011

Personal information
- Full name: James Alexander Lindsay
- Date of birth: 5 October 1958 (age 68)
- Place of birth: Scotland
- Height: 5 ft 9 in (1.75 m)
- Position: Winger

Youth career
- Fir Park BC

Senior career*
Years	Team	Apps	(Gls)
1976–79	Motherwell	41	(5)
1979–80	Ayr United	12	(1)
1980–81	Stirling Albion	3	(0)
1982–85	Petershill	90	(19)
Total		146	(25)

International career
1978	Scotland U-21	1	(0)

Managerial career
- 2005: Albion Rovers (caretaker)
- 2011–2013: Kirkintilloch Rob Roy
- 2017: Arthurlie (interim)
- * Club domestic league appearances and goals

James Alexander Lindsay (born 5 October 1958) is a Scottish former footballer who played as a winger for three clubs in the Scottish Football League. He is currently the assistant coach of Real Kashmir FC in the I-League.

== Career ==
Lindsay was born in Bellshill and joined Motherwell F.C. from school at age 15 in 1974, spent a year on the ground staff and went full-time the following year 1975 from Fir Park Boys Club. The club signed him on a three-year contract. In his first season in the club's reserve team, Lindsay scored 24 goals in 16 games, and he was fast-tracked to the first team at the end of season 1976–1977 by manager Willie McLean. During three seasons at the club, he made 41 league appearances in the Premier Division, and was capped once for the Scotland Under-21 team against the USA in September 1978. He later played for Ayr United F.C. and Stirling Albion F.C. before dropping to, with a knee injury Junior football with Petershill.

Focusing primarily on a career in youth coaching, Lindsay was appointed Head of Youth from August 1996 to March 2006, spending 10 years producing a successful full-time educational youth programme for young footballers, He had a short spell as Albion Rovers F.C. Interim Manager in 2005, where he introduced several of the club's youth players to the team, After being appointed manager of Kirkintilloch Rob Roy in June 2011, continued as Raith Rovers Academy Director until March 2012. In May 2013 Lindsay was appointed Technical Director and assistant coach of Kercem Ajax FC in Gozo and in June 2014 he signed a contract to coach at Luxol Sports Club in Malta.

Lindsay re-entered the Scottish Junior game as assistant to newly installed Arthurlie manager Chris Mackie in December 2016, and succeeded him in an interim role following Mackies resignation in October 2017.
