= David Lindsay (footballer, born 1919) =

Scottish footballer (1919–1987)

Personal information
- Full name: David Lindsay
- Date of birth: 29 June 1919
- Place of birth: Cambuslang, Scotland
- Date of death: 19 April 1987 (aged 67)
- Place of death: East Kilbride, Lanarkshire, Scotland
- Height: 5 ft 10 in (1.78 m)
- Position: Full-back

Youth career
- 1944–1945: Cambuslang Juniors

Senior career*
Years	Team	Apps	(Gls)
1945–1946	Blantyre Victoria		
1946–1948	Sunderland	1	(0)
1948–1951	Southend United	52	(1)
1951–195?	Yeovil Town		
- * Club domestic league appearances and goals

David Lindsay was born on 29 June 1919 to parents John Lindsay and his wife Martha McLachlan at 15 1/2 Howieshill Road, Cambuslang.

He married Barbara Hunter Forrester on 1 February 1947 at the Old Parish Church, Innerleithen, Peeblesshire.

He died at Hairmyers Hospital, East Kilbride, Lanarkshire in April 1987 at the age of 67.

David Lindsay (29 June 1919 – 19 April 1987) was a Scottish professional footballer who played as a full-back for Sunderland. He died in East Kilbride, Lanarkshire in April 1987 at the age of 67.
