= James Lindsay of Crawford (died 1358) =

Scottish feudal lord (died 1358)

Arms of Lindsay, blazoned: Gules, a fess chequy argent and azure

Sir James (de) Lindsay of Crawford (died 1358) was a Scottish feudal lord and politician.

== Life ==
Sir James de Lindsay was Lord of Crawford and Kirkmichael. (Note: Rot. Scot. i. 744.) He had been a hostage for King David II in 1351, and appears first in Parliament in 1357. (Note: Acta Parl. Scot. i. 156.) He was appointed an ambassador to England as Dominus de Crawford in 1357, (Note: Rymer's Fœdera, 1816, iii. 1, 370; Exch. Rolls, i. 613, 558.) but died before 11 November 1358.

== Marriage ==
He married Egidia, daughter of Walter, Steward of Scotland, and half-sister of Robert II of Scotland. A papal dispensation for this marriage was granted at Avignon on 3 Ides of April 1346, (Note: Papal Letters, iii. 225; Andrew Stuart's Hist. of the Stewarts.) which describes the spouse as within the third and fourth degree on the father's side, and in the fourth degree on the mother's. A strong inference thus arises that Sir James's grandmother, wife of Sir Alexander, was daughter to the Steward. Lady Egidia de Lindsay, as she was always afterwards styled, was married secondly, (Note: Reg. Mag. Sig., folio vol., 91; Haddo House Charters; Fifth Rep. Hist. MSS. Com., 612.) after October 1357, to Sir Hugh of Eglinton, (Note: See title Eglinton.) (Note: Fraser's Memorials of the Montgomeries, i. 17.) and thirdly (contract October 1378), to Sir James Douglas of Dalkeith. (Note: See title Morton.) (Note: Exch. Rolls, iii. 666; Reg. Hon. de Morton, ii. 139–140; Haigh Hall Charters.)

== Issue ==
Sir James and Egidia had issue:

1. Sir James, only son and heir.
2. Isabel, (Note: Reg. Mag. Sig., folio vol. p. 19.) married before 13 July 1369, to Sir John de Maxwell, (Note: Robertson's Index, 115–14.) who survived her.
3. Elizabeth, married to Sir Henry de Prestoun. (Note: Fraser's Maxwells of Pollok, i. 13.)

== Sources ==
- Cameron, Sonja (2004). "Lindsay family of Barnweill, Crawford, and Gleneskunlocked (per. c. 1250–c. 1400)". Oxford Dictionary of National Biography (online ed.). Oxford University Press. doi:10.1093/ref:odnb/54260. (Subscription, Wikipedia Library access or UK public library membership required.)

Attribution:

- Paul, James Balfour (1906). The Scots Peerage. Vol. 3. Edinburgh: David Douglas. p. 11.
