= David Lindsey (politician) =

American politician

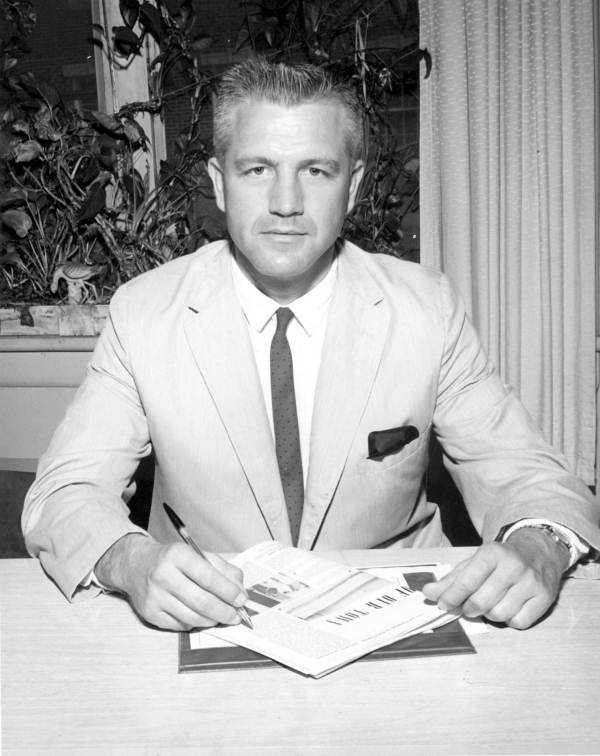

Member of the Florida House of Representatives from the 41st district
- In office 1967–1970

Personal details
- Born: August 16, 1931 (age 95) Pittsburgh, Pennsylvania, U.S.
- Party: Republican
- Education: San Angelo College, University of Buffalo, Gannon College
- Occupation: insurance agent

David L. Lindsey (born August 16, 1931) is a politician in the American state of Florida. He served in the Florida House of Representatives from 1967 to 1970, representing the 41st district.
