= Harry Lindsay (rugby union) =

Rugby union player from Northern Ireland

- Full name: Henry Lindsay
- Born: Armagh, County Armagh, Ireland
- Died: 17 July 1908 (aged 40) Ballywilly, County Armagh, Ireland

Rugby union career
- Position: Forward
International career
Years	Team	Apps	(Points)
1893–98	Ireland	13	(3)

Henry Lindsay (died 1908) was an Irish international rugby union player.

Born in Armagh, Lindsay played for Dublin University and was a versatile forward, sometimes utilised as a three-quarter on account of his speed. He was capped 13 times for Ireland from 1893 to 1898, which included all three matches of their 1894 Home Nations triple crown, as well as another championship win in 1896.

Lindsay served for a brief period as headmaster of Cookstown Academy.

== See also ==
- List of Ireland national rugby union players
