= Harry Lindsay (civil servant) =

Sir Harry Alexander Fanshawe Lindsay KCIE, CBE (11 March 1881 – 2 March 1963) was a British civil servant and administrator.

== Education ==
Lindsay was educated at St Paul's School and Worcester College, Oxford

== Career ==
In 1910 Lindsay became Under-Secretary to the government of Bengal. He moved to the Commerce and Industry Department of the Government of India in 1912.

In 1916 he was Director-General of Commercial Intelligence in Calcutta and in 1922 Secretary to the Government of India, Commerce Dept. In 1923 he became Government of India Trade Commissioner in London. In 1923 he was delegate for India to the Economic Committee of the League of Nations, and in 1932 Adviser to the Indian Delegation, Imperial Economic Conference at Ottawa. In 1934 he was appointed Director of the Imperial Institute, a post in which he remained until 1953. He served on government bodies including the Colonial Products Research Council.

Sir Lindsay was Chairman of Council of the Royal Society of Arts, editing the publication British Commonwealth Objectives in 1946. He was president of the Royal Geographical Society, the Geographical Association and vice-president of the Royal Commonwealth Society.

== Personal life ==
In 1909 Lindsay married Kathleen Louise Huntington. They had two sons.
