= Fordington, Lincolnshire =

Hamlet in Lincolnshire, England

Coordinates: 53.223°N 0.123°E

Fordington is a hamlet in the East Lindsey district of Lincolnshire in England. It is situated within Ulceby with Fordington civil parish.
