= David de Lindsay =

Anglo-Scottish baron

- Died: 1214
- Noble family: Lindsay family
- Father: William de Lindsay
- Mother: Alice or Aleanora de Limési

Sir David de Lindsay (died 1214), Lord of Luffness, Crawford, and Limési, known as "the elder" to distinguish him from his son, was an Anglo-Scottish baron of the 12th and 13th century.

== Life ==
Lindsay was the eldest son of Sir William de Lindsay and Alice or Aleanora de Limési. David held the position of Justiciar of Lothian, a post which his father had once held, with Gervase Avenel from 1208 until his death in 1214.

== Marriage and issue ==
He married Margerie, said to be an illegitimate daughter of Henry, Earl of Huntingdon, however more chronologically likely to have been an illegitimate daughter of David, Earl of Huntingdon, or even daughter of Margaret of Huntingdon, Duchess of Brittany, by third husband Sir William Fitzpatrick de Hertburn; they are known to have had the following issue:

- Sir David de Lindsay (died 1241), married Christiana, probably a daughter of Sir Walter Hosé, without issue.
- Sir Gerard de Lindsay (died 1249), succeeded his brother, without issue.
- Alice de Lindsay, married Henry de Pinkeney, heiress of her brothers, with issue.
