= James Alexander Lindsay (physician) =

British physician and professor of medicine

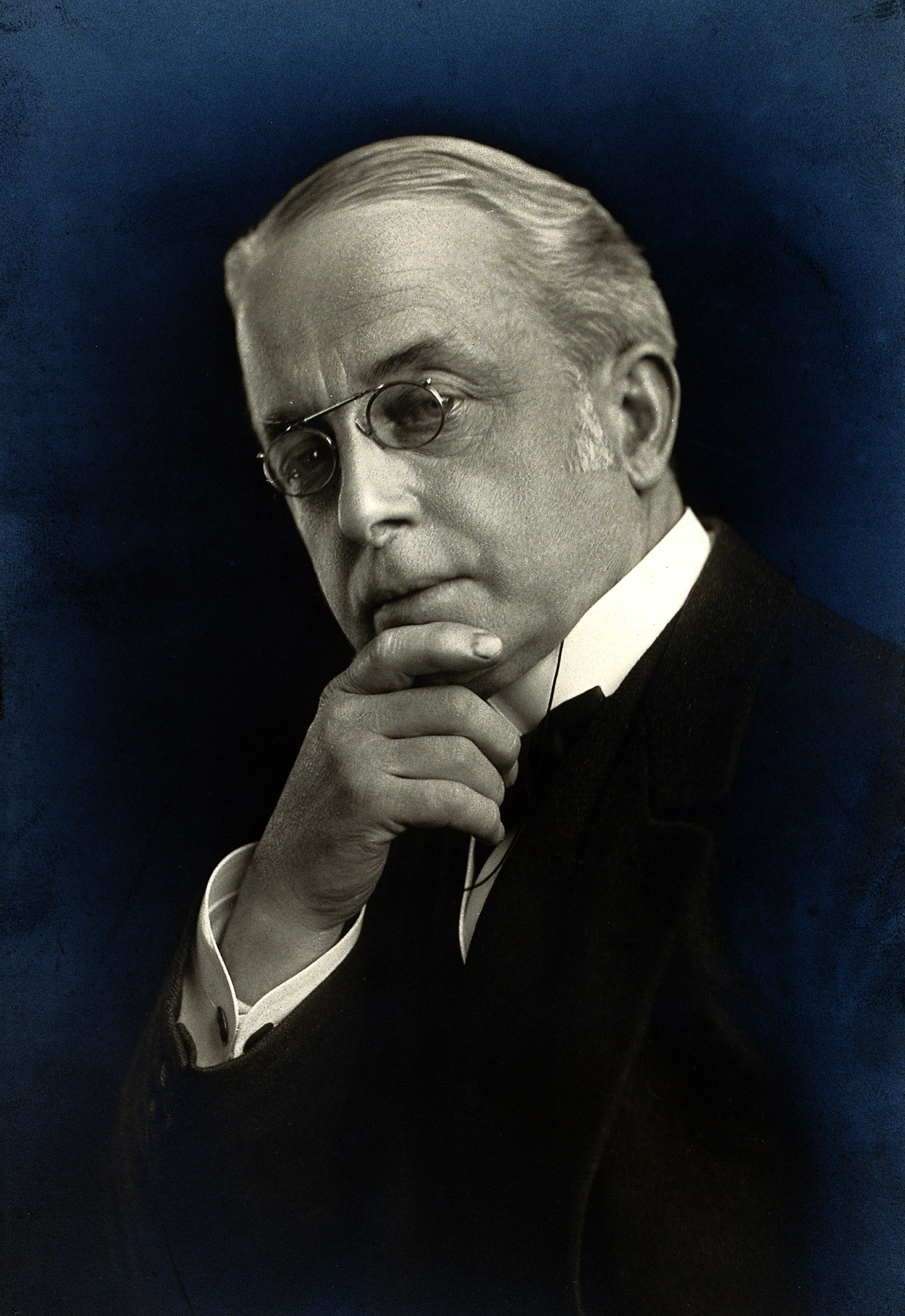
Portrait by Elliot & Fry. Credit: Wellcome Collection

James Alexander Lindsay FRCP (20 June 1856, in Fintona, County Tyrone – 14 December 1931, in Belfast) was a British physician and professor of medicine, known for his collection Medical axioms, aphorisms, and clinical memoranda (1923, London, H. K. Lewis & Co. Ltd.).

== Biography ==
After education at the Royal Belfast Academical Institution and at the Methodist College Belfast, James Alexander Lindsay matriculated at Queen's College Belfast, where he graduated in 1877 B.A. and in 1878 M.A. in ancient classics. In 1882 he obtained the M.D. and M.Ch. degrees in the Royal University of Ireland.

After two years of working in clinics in London, in Paris, and in Vienna, he returned to Belfast. At the Royal Victoria Hospital, Belfast, he was appointed in 1884 assistant physician and in 1888 full physician, retiring as consulting physician in 1921. From 1919 to 1927 he was chair of the board of management of the Royal Victoria Hospital. From 1899 to 1924 he held the chair of medicine in Queen's University Belfast. In the chair of medicine he was preceded by James Cuming (1833–1899) and succeeded by William Willis Dalziel Thomson.

In 1897–1898 Lindsay was president of the Ulster Medical Society. In 1903 he was elected FRCP. In 1909 he delivered the Bradshaw Lecture.

He belonged to the school of physicians who concentrated on accurate diagnosis, and that with the aid of his own senses and acumen, but had little interest in medical treatment; he never took up such artificial aids as electrocardiography, although it has to be said in his defence that he learned how to identify the waves defined by Einthoven. This pedantic approach was crystallised in the instruction cards of technique for examination of patients that he published. His lectures also were precise and old-fashioned, delivered at dictation speed throughout, to provide notes for future reference, as was common until good textbooks became more freely available in the 1950s.

Gifted with a mind at once scholarly and judicial, Lindsay believed that the teacher's function was to instruct the student how to learn and how to think. He was prominent in the cultural life of Belfast and found his recreation in music, golf, mountaineering and watching cricket. He died, a bachelor, in Belfast.

He was a member of the Aristotelian Society, and the author of valuable medical treatises, and of many contributions to the professional and philosophical journals. He also published a history of The Lindsay Family in Ireland.

His nephew, Royal Navy Captain D. C. Lindsay, was High Sheriff of Belfast for the year 1931. J. A. Lindsay and his nephew were descendants of James Lindsay, who fled from religion persecution in Ayrshire in 1678.

== Selected publications ==
=== Articles ===
- "Ocean as a health-restorer". Chambers's Journal of Popular Literature, Science, and Art. 5th series. 2 (89): 577–581. 12 September 1885.
- Lindsay, J. A. (2 December 1899). "An Inaugural Address on our Position and Outlook Delivered at Queen's College, Belfast, November 20th, 1899". Br Med J. 2 (2031): 1526–1529. doi:10.1136/bmj.2.2031.1526. PMC 2412718. PMID 20758742.
- Lindsay, J. A. (July 1912). "Immunity from disease considered in relation to eugenics". Eugen Rev. 4 (2): 117–135. PMC 2986833. PMID 21259532.
- "The Case for and against Eugenics". The Nineteenth Century and After. 72: 546–557. September 1912.
- Lindsay, J. A. (7 June 1913). "A clinical study of pneumonia with notes of one hundred consecutive cases occurring in hospital practice". Br Med J. 1 (2736): 1193–1196. doi:10.1136/bmj.1.2736.1193. PMC 2299285. PMID 20766671.
- Lindsay, J. A. (July 1913). "The influence of disease upon racial efficiency and survival". Eugen Rev. 5 (2): 101–113. PMC 2986953. PMID 21259555.
- Lindsay, J. A. (5 December 1914). "The Threshold of Disease An Address delivered to the Medical Section of the Royal Academy of Medicine in Ireland on November 20th, 1914". Br Med J. 2 (2814): 955–959. doi:10.1136/bmj.2.2814.955. PMC 2300252.
- Lindsay, J. A. (January 1916). "Eugenics and the doctrine of the super-man". Eugen Rev. 7 (4): 247–262. PMC 2987137. PMID 21259610.
- Alexander, James (February 1916). "Some observations upon the electrocardiograph, with notes of cases". Dublin J Med Sci. 141 (2): 130–138. doi:10.1007/BF02970015. S2CID 57338895.
- Lindsay, J. A. (October 1918). "The eugenic and social influence of the war". Eugen Rev. 10 (3): 133–144. PMC 2942289. PMID 21259675.
- "On thinking biologically". The Dalhousie Review. 1 (1): 5–16. April 1921.
- "What and how to teach" (PDF). The Dalhousie Review. 12 (2): 140–156. 1922.
- Lindsay, J. A. (8 December 1923). "Some Hints from the Old Physicians An Address delivered before the Bradford Medico-Chirurgical Society, October 17th, 1923". Br Med J. 2 (3284): 1077–1080. doi:10.1136/bmj.2.3284.1077. PMC 2317503. PMID 20771373.
- "Touraine, past and present" (PDF). The Dalhousie Review. 14 (2): 181–191. 1924.
- Lindsay, J. A. (23 April 1927). "Migraine". Br Med J. 1 (3459): 778–779. doi:10.1136/bmj.1.3459.778-a. PMC 2454768.
- "National characteristics" (PDF). The Dalhousie Review. 19 (2): 181–187. 1929.

=== Books ===
- with James Cuthbert Lindsay: The Lindsay Memoirs: A record of the Lisnacrieve and Belfast Lindsay family during the last two hundred years. Belfast: William Strain and Sons. 1884; 80 pages
- The climatic treatment of consumption. London: Macmillan. 1887; 228 pages
- Lectures chiefly clinical and practical on diseases of the lungs and the heart. London: Baillière, Tindall and Cox. 1904.; 2nd edition 1906
- Medical axioms, aphorisms, and clinical memoranda. New York: Hoeber. 1924; reprint of 1923 original
