= William de Lindsay =

Scottish noble

- Noble family: Lindsay family
- Spouse: Alice de Limési or de Limesay
- Father: William de Lindsay of Luffness and Ercildum
- Mother: Unnamed daughter of Thor, Lord of Crawford

Sir William de Lindsay (1155–1205), Lord of Crawford, Lord and Baron of Luffness, Lord of Ercildum, Justiciar of Lothian, was a 12th-century Scottish noble.

== Life ==
Lindsay was a son of Sir William de Lindsay of Luffness and Ercildum, Baron of Luffness (c. 1120-c. 1185), paternal grandson of Sir William de Lindsay (1100–Earlston, 1163), in turn son of Sir William de Ghent de Lindsay (c. 1085–c. 1150 or East Lothian, abt. 1072–22 August 1139), and maternal grandson of Thor, Lord of Crawford. His sister Margaret de Lindsay (Kilmarnock, 1160-Kilmarnock, c. 1240) married Sir Malcolm de Drummond, 5th Thane of Lennox, Chief of Clan Drummond (Drymen, c. 1165-Stirling, 1200), and had issue.

William inherited half moiety of the barony of Cavendish, Suffolk, through his wife Alice or Aleanora, as heiress to her nephew Hugh de Limési or de Limesay. He held the office of Justiciar of Lothian between 1189 and 1199.

In 1164 his father William, jure uxoris 1st Lord of Crawford, sat in the Scottish Parliament as Baron of Luffness. After King William I of Scotland was captured in 1174 at the Battle of Alnwick, William was provided as a hostage for William I at Falaise, Normandy.

== Marriage and issue ==
He married Alice or Aleanora de Limési or de Limesay, daughter of Gerard, Lord of Limési, and Amicia de Bidun, they had the following known issue:

- Sir David de Lindsay of Luffness, Crawford, Ercildum and Limési (died 1214), married Margerie or Marjorie de Huntingdon, had issue.
- William de Lindsay (died c. 1238), had issue.
