= House of Stuart =

British royal house of Scottish origin

Stuart Stewart
- Royal house
- Coat of arms of Stuart Kings of England, 1603–1649
- Parent family: Clan Stewart
- Country: Scotland, England, Ireland, Great Britain
- Founded: 1371; 655 years ago
- Founder: Robert II of Scotland (1371–1390)
- Final ruler: Anne, Queen of Great Britain (1702–1714)
- Titles: List: King and Queen of Scotland; King and Queen of England; King and Queen of Ireland; Queen of Great Britain; King and Queen of France (Note: titular claim rather than de facto); High Steward of Scotland; Duke of Lennox; Duke of Albany; Duke of Richmond; Duke of York; Duke of Grafton; Duke of St Albans; Duke of Buccleuch; Marquess of Bute; Earl of Moray; Earl of Lennox; Queen of France; Lord of Ireland (Note: Title assumed by James V of Scotland, in correspondence with Irish chieftains, as a challenge to Henry VIII, who had recently been declared 'King of Ireland.'); Lord of Aubigny
- Dissolution: 1807
- Cadet branches: List: Stewart of Ardvorlich; Stewart of Ballechin; Stewart of Castle Stewart; Stewart of Darnley; Stewart of Galloway; Fitz-James Stuart family

The House of Stuart, originally spelled Stewart, also known as the Stuart dynasty, was a royal house of Scotland, England, Ireland and later Great Britain. The family name comes from the office of High Steward of Scotland, first held by the family progenitor Walter fitz Alan (c. 1150). The name Stewart and variations had become established as a family name by the time of his grandson Walter Stewart. The first monarch of the Stewart line was Robert II; he and his descendants were monarchs of Scotland from 1371 and of England, Ireland and Great Britain from 1603 until 1714. Mary, Queen of Scots (r. 1542–1567), was brought up in France where she adopted the French spelling of the name, Stuart.

In 1503, James IV married Margaret Tudor, thus linking the reigning royal houses of Scotland and England. Margaret's niece, Elizabeth I of England died without issue in 1603, and James IV's and Margaret's great-grandson James VI of Scotland acceded to the thrones of England and Ireland as James I in the Union of the Crowns. The Stuarts were monarchs of Britain and Ireland and its growing empire until the death of Queen Anne in 1714, except for the period of the Commonwealth between 1649 and 1660. (Note: The Earls of Galloway are the senior surviving line of the Stuarts. They are descended from a line which originated from the second son of Alexander Stewart, 4th High Steward of Scotland, and are not members of the Stewart/Stuart royal line; however, they are part of the peerage.)

In total, nine Stewart/Stuart monarchs ruled Scotland alone from 1371 until 1603, the last of whom was James VI, before his accession in England. Two Stuart queens ruled the isles following the Glorious Revolution in 1688: Mary II and Anne. Both were the Protestant daughters of James VII and II by his first wife Anne Hyde and the great-grandchildren of James VI and I. Their father had converted to Catholicism and his new wife gave birth to a son in 1688, who was to be brought up as a Roman Catholic; so James was deposed by Parliament in 1689, in favour of his daughters. However, neither daughter had any children who survived to adulthood, so the crown passed to the House of Hanover on the death of Queen Anne in 1714 under the terms of the Act of Settlement 1701 and the Act of Security 1704. The House of Hanover had become linked to the House of Stuart through the line of Elizabeth Stuart, Queen of Bohemia.

After the loss of the throne, the descendants of James VII and II continued for several generations to attempt to reclaim the Scottish and English (and later British) throne as the rightful heirs, their supporters being known as Jacobites. Since the early 19th century, when the James II direct line failed, there have been no active claimants from the Stuart family. The current Jacobite heir to the claims of the historical Stuart monarchs is a distant cousin Franz, Duke of Bavaria, of the House of Wittelsbach. The senior living member of the royal Stewart family, descended in a legitimate male line from Robert II of Scotland, is Andrew Richard Charles Stuart, 9th Earl Castle Stewart.

== Origins ==
The ancestral origins of the Stuart family are obscure—their probable ancestry is traced back to Alan fitz Flaad, a Breton who went to England not long after the Norman Conquest. Alan had been the hereditary steward of the Bishop of Dol in the Duchy of Brittany; Alan had a good relationship with Henry I of England who awarded him with lands in Shropshire. The FitzAlan family quickly established themselves as a prominent Anglo-Norman noble house, with some of its members serving as high sheriffs of Shropshire. It was the son of Alan named Walter FitzAlan who became the first hereditary high steward of Scotland, while his brother William's family went on to become earls of Arundel.

When the civil war in the Kingdom of England, known as The Anarchy, broke out between Empress Matilda and King Stephen, Walter had sided with Matilda. Another supporter of Matilda was her uncle David I of Scotland from the House of Dunkeld. After Matilda was pushed out of England into the County of Anjou, essentially failing in her attempt for the throne, many of her supporters in England fled also. It was then that Walter followed David up to the Kingdom of Scotland, where he was granted lands in Renfrewshire and the title for life of lord high steward. The next monarch of Scotland, Malcolm IV, made the high steward title a hereditary arrangement. While high stewards, the family were based at Dundonald, South Ayrshire, between the 12th and 13th centuries.

== History ==
undiffered arms of stewart Stewart of Stewart	Arms of Stewart of Albany Stewart of Albany
Arms of Stewart of Barclye Stewart of Barclye	Arms of Stewart of Garlies Stewart of Garlies	Arms of Stewart of Minto Stewart of Minto
Arms of Stewart of Atholl Stewart of Atholl	Arms of Stewart of Bute Stewart of Bute	Arms of Stuart of Bute Stuart of Bute
Arms of Stewart of Ardvorlich Stewart of Ardvorlich	Arms of Stewart of Physgill Stewart of Physgill	Arms of Stewart of Rothesay Stewart of Rothesay

The sixth high steward of Scotland, Walter Stewart (1293–1326), married Marjorie, daughter of Robert the Bruce, and also played an important part in the Battle of Bannockburn gaining further favour. Their son Robert was heir to the House of Bruce, the Lordship of Cunningham and the Bruce lands of Bourtreehill; he eventually inherited the Scottish throne when his uncle David II died childless in 1371.

In 1503, James IV attempted to secure peace with England by marrying King Henry VII's daughter, Margaret Tudor. The birth of their son, later James V, brought the House of Stewart into the line of descent of the House of Tudor, and the English throne. Margaret Tudor later married Archibald Douglas, 6th Earl of Angus, and their daughter, Margaret Douglas, was the mother of Henry Stuart, Lord Darnley. In 1565, Darnley married his half-cousin Mary, Queen of Scots, the daughter of James V. Darnley's father was Matthew Stewart, 4th Earl of Lennox, a member of the Stewart of Darnley branch of the House. Lennox was a descendant of Alexander Stewart, 4th High Steward of Scotland, also descended from James II, being Mary's heir presumptive. Thus Darnley was also related to Mary on his father's side and because of this connection, Mary's heirs remained part of the House of Stuart. Following John Stewart of Darnley's ennoblement for his part at the Battle of Baugé in 1421 and the grant of lands to him at Aubigny and Concressault, the Darnley Stewarts' surname was gallicised to Stuart.

Both Mary, Queen of Scots, and Lord Darnley had strong claims on the English throne through their mutual grandmother Margaret Tudor. This eventually led to the accession of the couple's only child James as king of Scotland, England, and Ireland in 1603. However, this was a personal union, as the three Kingdoms shared a monarch, but had separate governments, churches, and institutions. Indeed, the personal union did not prevent an armed conflict, known as the Bishops' Wars, breaking out between England and Scotland in 1639. This was to become part of the cycle of political and military conflict that marked the reign of Charles I of England, Scotland and Ireland, culminating in a series of conflicts known as the War of the Three Kingdoms. The trial and execution of Charles I by the English Parliament in 1649 began 11 years of republican government known as the English Interregnum. Scotland initially recognised the late King's son, also called Charles, as their monarch, before being subjugated and forced to enter Cromwell's Commonwealth by General Monck's occupying army. During this period, the principal members of the House of Stuart lived in exile in mainland Europe. Charles II returned to Britain to assume the three thrones in 1660 with the support of General Monck, but dated his reign from his father's death eleven years before.

In feudal and dynastic terms, the Scottish reliance on French support was revived during the reign of Charles II, whose own mother was French. His sister Henrietta married into the French royal family. Charles II left no legitimate children, but his numerous illegitimate descendants included the dukes of Buccleuch, the dukes of Grafton, the dukes of Saint Albans and the dukes of Richmond.

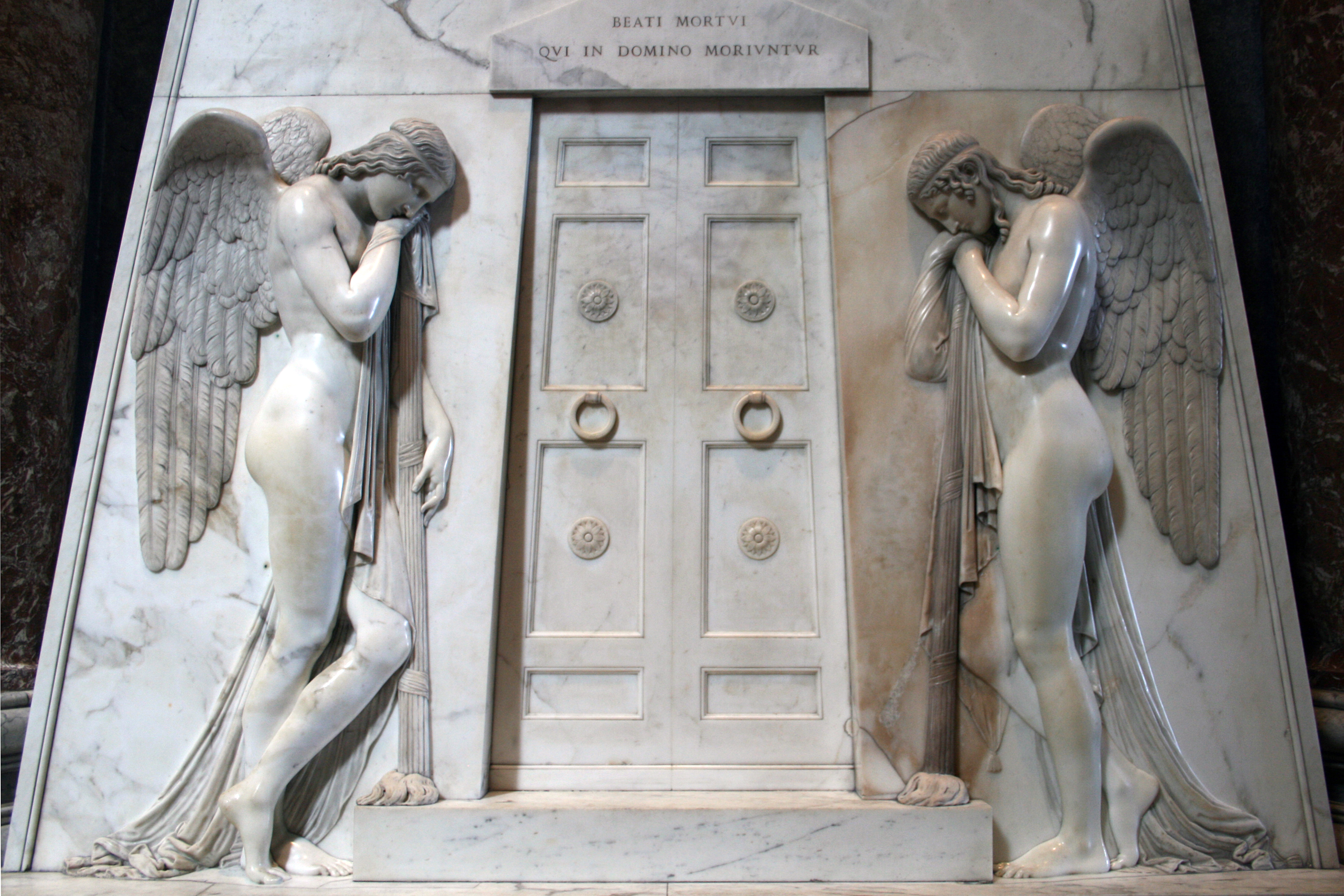
Monument to the Royal Stuarts in St. Peter's Basilica – Work of Antonio Canova.

The Royal House of Stuart became extinct with the death of Cardinal Henry Benedict Stuart, brother of Charles Edward Stuart, in 1807. Duke Francis of Bavaria is the current senior heir.

== List of monarchs ==
=== Monarchs of Scotland ===
Monarch	From	Until	Relationship with predecessor
Robert II	22 February 1371	19 April 1390	Nephew of David II who died without issue. Robert's mother Marjorie Bruce was daughter of Robert I.
Robert III	19 April 1390	4 April 1406	Son of Robert II.
James I	4 April 1406	21 February 1437	Son of Robert III.
James II	21 February 1437	3 August 1460	Son of James I.
James III	3 August 1460	11 June 1488	Son of James II.
James IV	11 June 1488	9 September 1513	Son of James III.
James V	9 September 1513	14 December 1542	Son of James IV.
Mary	14 December 1542	24 July 1567	Daughter of James V.
James VI	24 July 1567	27 March 1625	Son of Mary, Queen of Scots.

=== Monarchs of England, Scotland, and Ireland ===
From the Acts of Union 1707, which came into effect on 1 May 1707, the last Stuart monarch, Anne, became Queen of Great Britain and Ireland.

Monarch	From	Until	Relationship with predecessor
James VI and I	24 March 1603	27 March 1625	Great-great-grandson of Henry VII of England. King of Scotland alone until inheriting the titles King of England and Ireland, including claim to France from his House of Tudor cousin Elizabeth I.
Charles I	27 March 1625	30 January 1649 (executed)	Son of James VI and I
Charles II	30 January 1649 (de jure); 2 May 1660 (de facto)	6 February 1685	Son of Charles I. Prohibited by Parliament from assuming the throne during a republican period of government known as the Commonwealth of England. Accepted as king in 1661, retroactive to 1649. Died without legitimate children.
James VII and II	6 February 1685	11 December 1688	Brother of Charles II, who died without legitimate issue. Son of Charles I. Overthrown at the Revolution of 1688. Died in 1701.
Mary II	13 February 1689	28 December 1694	Daughter of James VII and II, who was still alive and pretending to the throne. Co-monarch was William III & II who outlived his wife. Died childless.
Anne	8 March 1702	1 August 1714	Sister of Mary II, daughter of James VII and II. Name of state changed to Great Britain with the political Acts of Union 1707, though family has used title since James VI and I. Died without living children, rights pass to House of Hanover.

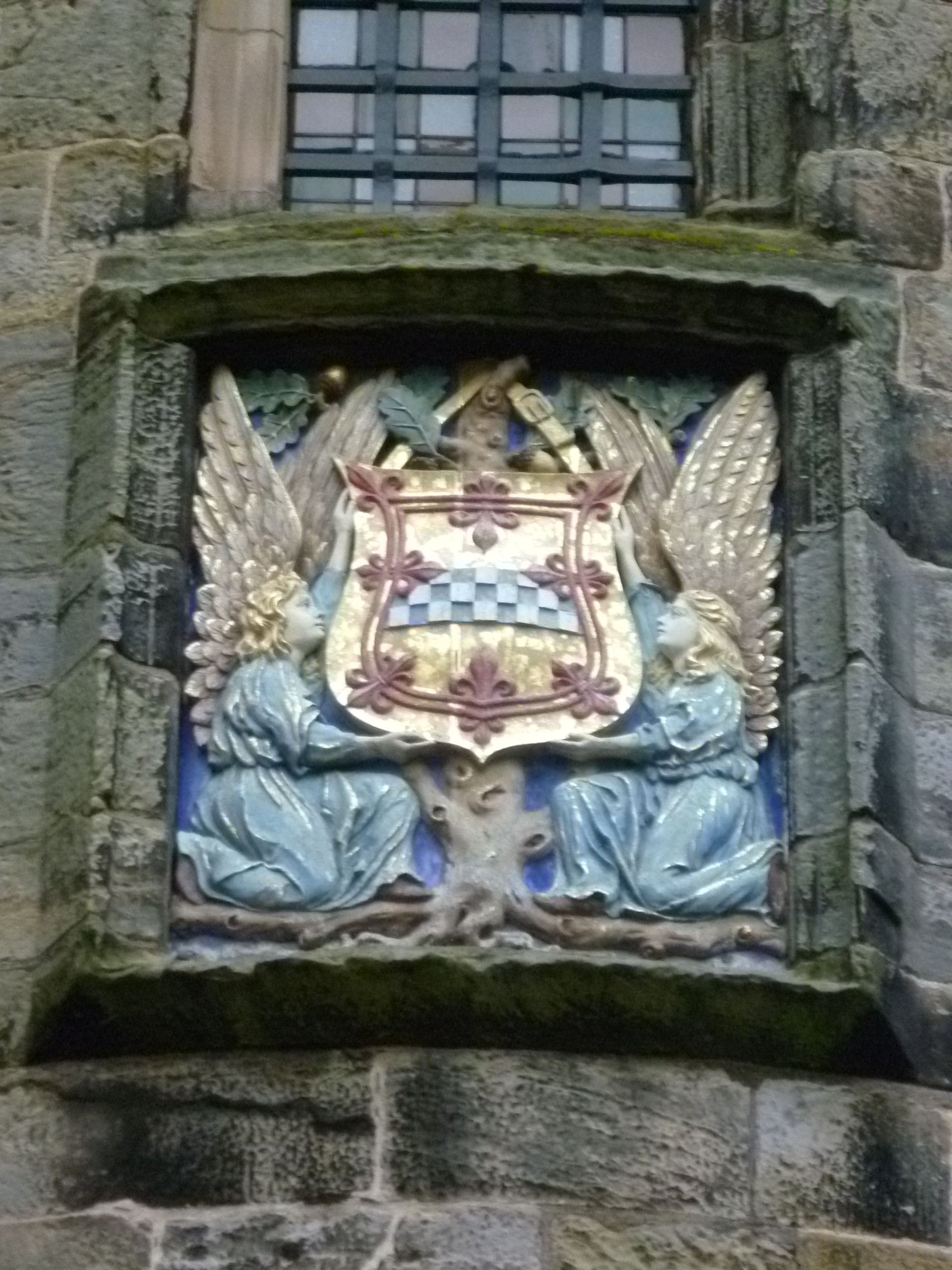
Armorial tablet of the Stewarts at Falkland Palace, Fife

== Family tree ==
Round provided a family tree to embody his essential findings, which is adapted below.

**Alan**, Dapifer Dolensis (Seneschal or Steward of Dol)
**Alan**, Dapifer Dolensis, Took part in First Crusade, 1097.	**Flaald**; Occurs at Monmouth, 1101/2	**Rhiwallon**; Monk of St Florent.
**Alan Fitz Flaad**, Founder of Sporle Priory
**Jordan Fitz Alan**, Dapifer in Brittany, Benefactor of Sele Priory.	**William Fitz Alan**, Lord of Oswestry; Founder/benefactor of Haughmond Abbey, Died 1160	**Walter fitz Alan**; Dapifer Regis Scotiae, Founder of Paisley Abbey, Died 1177
**Alan Fitz Jordan**, Dapifer Dolensis.	**William Fitz Alan II**, Lord of Oswestry and Clun	**Alan the Steward**; Senescallus Regis Scotiae

=== Origin ===
- Alan fitz Flaad
  - William FitzAlan, Lord of Oswestry
    - William Fitz Alan, 1st Lord of Oswestry and Clun
      - William Fitz Alan, 2nd Lord of Oswestry and Clun
      - John Fitzalan, Lord of Oswestry
        - John FitzAlan, 6th Earl of Arundel
          - House of FitzAlan
  - Jordan fitz Alan, Seneschal of Dol
  - Walter fitz Alan, 1st High Steward of Scotland
    - Alan fitz Walter, 2nd High Steward of Scotland
      - Walter Stewart, 3rd High Steward of Scotland
        - Alexander Stewart, 4th High Steward of Scotland
          - James Stewart, 5th High Steward of Scotland
            - Walter Stewart, 6th High Steward of Scotland
              - **Robert II of Scotland**
              - John Stewart of Ralston
          - John Stewart of Bonkyll
            - Alexander Stewart of Bonkyll
              - Earls of Angus (extinct 1361)
            - Alan Stewart of Dreghorn
              - **Stewart of Darnley**
                - **Earls of Lennox**
                - Stewart of Garlies
                  - Earls of Galloway
                  - Stewart of Burray
                  - Stewart of Physgill (Phisgal)
                  - Stewart of Minto
                    - Lords Blantyre
                  - Stewart of Tongrie
                  - Stewart of Barclye
            - Walter Stewart of Garlies and Dalswinton
              - John Stewart of Dalswinton
                - Walter Stewart of Garlies and Dalswinton
            - James Stewart of Pearston
              - Stewart of Pearston
                - Stewart of Lorn
                  - Clan Stewart of Appin
                - Earls of Atholl
                - Earls of Buchan
                  - Earls of Traquair (illegitimate)
            - John Stewart of Daldon
            - Robert Stewart of Daldowie
        - Walter Bailloch
          - Earls of Menteith
        - Robert Stewart, Lord of Darnley
  - Simon fitz Alan
    - Clan Boyd

=== House of Stewart ===
- Robert II of Scotland
  - Robert III of Scotland
    - David Stewart, Duke of Rothesay
    - James I of Scotland
      - Alexander Stewart, Duke of Rothesay
      - James II of Scotland
        - James III of Scotland
          - James IV of Scotland
            - James, Duke of Rothesay
            - Arthur Stewart, Duke of Rothesay
            - James V of Scotland
              - James, Duke of Rothesay
              - Arthur, Duke of Albany
              - **Mary, Queen of Scots**
            - Alexander Stewart, Duke of Ross
          - James Stewart, Duke of Ross
          - John Stewart, Earl of Mar
        - Alexander Stewart, Duke of Albany
          - Alexander Stewart, Bishop of Moray
          - John Stewart, Duke of Albany
        - David Stewart, Earl of Moray
        - John Stewart, Earl of Mar
      - Sir John Stewart (illegitimate)
        - Stewart of Ballechin
  - Walter, Lord of Fife
  - Robert Stewart, Duke of Albany
    - Murdoch Stewart, Duke of Albany
      - Robert Stewart
      - Walter Stewart
        - Lords Avandale
          - Lords Stuart of Ochiltree
            - Barons Castle Stewart
              - Earls Castle Stewart
      - Alasdair Stewart
      - James Mor Stewart
        - James "Beag" Stewart (illegitimate)
          - Stewart of Balquhidder
            - Stewart of Ardvorlich
            - Stewart of Glen Buckie
            - Stewart of Gartnafuaran
            - Stewart of Annat
    - John Stewart, Earl of Buchan
    - Robert Stewart, Earl of Ross
  - Alexander Stewart, Earl of Buchan, the Wolf of Badenoch
    - Illegitimate sons
      - Stewart of Atholl
  - David Stewart, Earl of Strathearn
  - Walter Stewart, Earl of Atholl
    - Alan Stewart, 4th Earl of Caithness
    - David Stewart, Master of Atholl
  - John Stewart, Sheriff of Bute (illegitimate)
    - Clan Stuart of Bute

=== House of Stuart ===
Descended from the Stewarts of Darnley (Stewarts of Lennox)

- Henry Stuart, Lord Darnley, husband of Mary, Queen of Scots
  - James VI and I
    - Henry Frederick, Prince of Wales
    - Charles I of England
      - Charles II of England
        - James Scott, 1st Duke of Monmouth (illegitimate)
          - Dukes of Buccleuch
        - Charles FitzCharles, 1st Earl of Plymouth (illegitimate)
        - Charles FitzRoy, 2nd Duke of Cleveland (illegitimate)
          - Dukes of Cleveland (extinct 1774)
        - Henry FitzRoy, 1st Duke of Grafton (illegitimate)
          - Dukes of Grafton
        - George FitzRoy, 1st Duke of Northumberland (illegitimate)
        - Charles Beauclerk, 1st Duke of St Albans (illegitimate)
          - Dukes of St Albans
        - Charles Lennox, 1st Duke of Richmond (illegitimate)
          - Dukes of Richmond, Lennox and Gordon
      - James II of England
        - Charles Stuart, Duke of Cambridge
        - James Stuart, Duke of Cambridge
        - Charles Stuart, Duke of Kendal
        - Edgar, Duke of Cambridge
        - Charles Stuart, Duke of Cambridge
        - James Francis Edward Stuart
          - Charles Edward Stuart
          - Henry Benedict Stuart
        - James FitzJames, 1st Duke of Berwick (illegitimate)
          - House of FitzJames
            - Dukes of Berwick
            - Dukes of Fitz-James (extinct 1967)
        - Henry FitzJames (illegitimate)
      - Henry Stuart, Duke of Gloucester
    - Robert Stuart, Duke of Kintyre and Lorne

=== Complete male-line family tree ===
List of male-line members of the Houses of FitzAlan and Stuart

Male, male-line, legitimate, non-morganatic members of the house who either lived to adulthood, or who held a title as a child, are included. Heads of the house are in bold.

- Alan fitz Flaad, c. 1060–1120
  - William FitzAlan, Lord of Oswestry, 1085–1160
    - William FitzAlan, 1st Lord of Oswestry and Clun, d. 1210
      - William FitzAlan, 2nd Lord of Oswestry and Clun, d. 1215
      - John Fitzalan, 3rd Lord of Clun and Oswestry, 1200–1240
        - John Fitzalan II, Lord of Oswestry, Clun, and Arundel, 1223–1267
          - John FitzAlan III, Lord and Baron of Clun and Oswestry, 1246–1272
            - Richard Fitzalan, 1st Earl of Arundel, 1267–1302
              - Edmund Fitzalan, 2nd Earl of Arundel, 1285–1326
                - Richard Fitzalan, 3rd Earl of Arundel, 8th Earl of Surrey, 1313–1376
                  - Richard Fitzalan, 4th Earl of Arundel, 9th Earl of Surrey, 1346–1397
                    - Thomas Fitzalan, 5th Earl of Arundel, 10th Earl of Surrey, 1381–1415
                    - William Fitzalan
                  - John FitzAlan, 1st Baron Arundel, 1348–1379
                    - John FitzAlan, 2nd Baron Arundel, 1364–1390
                      - John Fitzalan, 6th Earl of Arundel, 3rd Baron Maltravers, 1385–1421
                        - John Fitzalan, 7th Earl of Arundel, 4th Baron Maltravers, 1408–1435
                          - Humphrey Fitzalan, 8th Earl of Arundel, 1429–1438
                        - William Fitzalan, 9th Earl of Arundel, 6th Baron Maltravers, 1417–1487
                          - Thomas Fitzalan, 10th Earl of Arundel, 7th Baron Maltravers, 1450–1524
                            - William Fitzalan, 11th Earl of Arundel, 8th Baron Maltravers, 1476–1544
                              - Henry Fitzalan, 12th Earl of Arundel, 1512–1580
                                - Henry Fitzalan, 1538–1556
                            - Edward Fitzalan
                          - William Fitzalan
                          - George Fitzalan
                          - John Fitzalan
                      - Thomas FitzAlan, d. 1430
                      - Edward (or Edmund) Fitzalan
                    - Richard FitzAlan, 1366–1419
                    - William Arundel, c. 1369–1400
                  - Thomas Arundel, Archbishop of Canterbury, 1353–1414
                - Edmund, d. 1349
                - Michael
              - John, a priest
  - Walter fitz Alan, 1090–1177
    - Alan fitz Walter, 2nd High Steward of Scotland, 1120–1204
      - David fitz Alan
      - Walter Stewart, 3rd High Steward of Scotland, d. 1246
        - Alexander Stewart, 4th High Steward of Scotland, 1210–1282
          - James Stewart, 5th High Steward of Scotland, 1260–1309
            - Walter Stewart, 6th High Steward of Scotland, 1296–1327
              - Robert II of Scotland, 1316–1390
                - Robert III of Scotland, 1337–1406
                  - David Stewart, Duke of Rothesay, 1376–1402
                  - James I of Scotland, 1394–1437
                    - James II of Scotland, 1430–1460
                      - James III of Scotland, 1452–1488
                        - James IV of Scotland, 1473–1513
                          - James V of Scotland, 1512–1542
                        - James Stewart, Duke of Ross, 1476–1504
                        - John Stewart, Earl of Mar, 1479–1503
                      - Alexander Stewart, Duke of Albany, 1454–1485
                        - John Stewart, Duke of Albany, 1482–1536
                      - John Stewart, Earl of Mar, 1456–1479
                - Walter Stewart, Lord of Fife, 1338–1362
                - Robert Stewart, Duke of Albany, 1340–1420
                  - Murdoch Stewart, Duke of Albany, 1362–1425
                    - Robert Stewart, d. 1421
                    - Walter Stewart, c. 1392–1425
                      - Andrew Stewart, 1st Lord Avandale, 1420–1488
                      - Walter Stewart
                        - Alexander Stewart
                          - Andrew Stewart, 1st Lord Avondale, d. 1513
                            - Andrew Stewart, 2nd Lord Avondale, d. 1549
                              - Andrew Stewart, 2nd Lord Ochiltree, 1521–1591
                                - Andrew Stewart, Master of Ochiltree, d. 1578
                                  - Andrew Stuart, 1st Baron Castle Stuart, 3rd Lord Ochiltree, 1560–1629
                                    - Andrew Stewart, 2nd Baron Castle Stewart, 1590–1639
                                      - Andrew Stewart, 3rd Baron Castle Stewart, d. 1650
                                      - Josias Stewart, 4th Baron Castle Stewart, d. 1662
                                    - John Stewart, 5th Baron Castle Stewart, d. 1685
                                    - Robert Stewart, of Irry, 1598–1662
                                      - Robert Stewart, de jure 6th Baron Castle Stewart, d. 1686
                                        - Andrew Stewart, de jure 7th Baron Castle Stewart, 1672–1715
                                          - Robert Stewart, de jure 8th Baron Castle Stewart, 1700–1742
                                            - Andrew Thomas Stewart, 9th Baron Castle Stewart, 1st Earl Castle Stewart, 1725–1809
                                              - Robert Stewart, 2nd Earl Castle Stewart, 1784–1854
                                                - Edward Stewart, 3rd Earl Castle Stewart, 1807–1857
                                                - Charles Andrew Knox Stewart, 4th Earl Castle Stewart, 1810–1874
                                                  - Henry James Stuart-Richardson, 5th Earl Castle Stewart, 1837–1914
                                                - Rev. Hon. Andrew Godfrey Stewart, 1812–1889
                                                  - Andrew Stuart, 6th Earl Castle Stewart, 1841–1921
                                                    - Andrew John Stuart, Viscount Stuart, 1880–1915
                                                    - Robert Sheffield Stuart, 1886–1914
                                                    - Arthur Stuart, 7th Earl Castle Stewart, 1889–1961
                                                      - David Andrew Noel Stuart, Viscount Stuart, 1921–1942
                                                      - Robert John Ochiltree Stuart, Viscount Stuart, 1923−1944
                                                      - Patrick Stuart, 8th Earl Castle Stewart, 1928–2023
                                                        - Andrew Richard Charles, 9th Earl Castle Stewart, b. 1953, the senior living Stewart
                                                      - Hon. Simon Walter Erskine Stuart, 1930–2002
                                                        - Thomas Harry Erskine Stuart, b. 1974)
                                                        - Corin Edward Leveson Stuart, b. 1975
                                                        - Tristram James Avondale Stuart, b. 1977
                                                    - Charles Patrick Stuart, 1892–1928
                                              - Hon. Andrew Godfrey Stuart, 1790–1872
                                                - Andrew Thomas Stuart, 1814–1894
                                                  - Robert Walter Stuart, 1845–1918
                                                    - Walter Burleigh Stuart, 1875–1912
                                                      - Burleigh Athol Stuart, 1904–1982
                                                        - Ernest Martin Stuart, b. 1935
                                                          - Conway Athol Stuart, b. 1968
                                                - Burleigh William Henry Fitzgibbon Stuart, 1823–1905
                                                  - Godfrey Richard Conyngham Stuart, 1866–1955
                                                    - Robin Charles Burleigh Stuart, 1907–1970
                                                      - Douglas Charles Burleigh Stuart, b. 1940
                                                        - Andrew John Burleigh Stuart, b. 1967
                                                          - James William Burleigh Stuart, b. 2006
                                                  - Burleigh Francis Brownlow Stuart, 1868–1952
                                                    - Burleigh Edward St. Lawrence Stuart, 1920–2004
                                                      - Edward John Burleigh Stuart, b. 1953
                                                        - Simon Francis Brownlow Stuart, b. 1980
                                                        - Henry George Burleigh Stuart, b. 1982
                                  - Josias Stewart of Bonington
                                - James Stewart, Earl of Arran, d. 1595
                                  - James Stewart, 4th Lord Ochiltree, d. 1658
                                    - William Stewart, 5th Lord Ochiltree, d. 1675
                                - William Stewart of Monkton, d. 1588
                                  - William Stewart
                                - Henry Stewart of Braidwood
                            - Henry Stewart, 1st Lord Methven, 1495–1552
                              - Henry Stewart, 2nd Lord Methven, 1551–1572
                                - Henry Stewart, 3rd Lord Methven, d. 1586
                            - James Stewart of Beath
                              - James Stewart, 1st Lord Doune, 1529–1590
                                - James Stewart, 2nd Earl of Moray, 1565–1592
                                  - James Stuart, 3rd Earl of Moray, 1581–1638
                                    - James Stuart, 4th Earl of Moray, 1611–1653
                                      - Alexander Stuart, 5th Earl of Moray, 1634–1701
                                        - James, Lord Doune, 1660–1685
                                        - Charles Stuart, 6th Earl of Moray, 1683–1735
                                        - Francis Stuart, 7th Earl of Moray, 1683–1739
                                          - James Stuart, 8th Earl of Moray, 1708–1767
                                            - Francis Stuart, 9th Earl of Moray, 1737–1810
                                              - Francis Stuart, 10th Earl of Moray, 1771–1848
                                                - Francis Stuart, 11th Earl of Moray, 1795–1859
                                                - John Stuart, 12th Earl of Moray, 1797–1867
                                                - Archibald Stuart, 13th Earl of Moray, 1810–1872
                                                - George Stuart, 14th Earl of Moray, 1816–1895
                                              - Archibald Stewart, 1771–1832
                                                - Francis Stuart, 1793–1875
                                                - John Stuart, 1795–1840
                                                - James Stuart, 1797–1850
                                                - Rev. Edmund Stuart, 1798–1869
                                                  - Edmund Stuart, 15th Earl of Moray, 1840–1901
                                                  - Francis Stuart, 16th Earl of Moray, 1842–1909
                                                  - Morton Stuart, 17th Earl of Moray, 1855–1930
                                                    - Francis Stuart, 18th Earl of Moray, 1892–1943
                                                    - Archibald Stuart, 19th Earl of Moray, 1894–1974
                                                      - Douglas Stuart, 20th Earl of Moray, 1928–2011
                                                        - John Stuart, 21st Earl of Moray, b. 1966
                                                          - James Stuart, Lord Doune, b. 2002
                                                          - Alexander Stuart, b. 2004
                                                          - Frederick Stuart, b. 2006
                                                      - Charles Stuart, b. 1933
                                                        - James Stuart, b. 1962
                                                        - Justin Stuart, b. 1964
                                                        - Duncan Stuart, b. 1967
                                                      - James Stuart, b. 1933
                                                    - James Stuart, 1st Viscount Stuart of Findhorn, 1897–1971
                                                      - David Stuart, 2nd Viscount Stuart of Findhorn, 1924–1999
                                                        - James Stuart, 3rd Viscount Stuart of Findhorn, b. 1948
                                                      - John Stuart, 1925–1990
                                                - Douglas Stuart, 1801–1855
                                                  - Douglas Stuart, 1843–1863
                                                - George Stuart, 1805–1835
                                            - James Stuart, 1741–1809
                                            - David Stuart, 1745–1784
                                          - Francis Stuart
                                            - Francis Stuart, d. 1766
                                        - John Stuart, 1675–1765
                                      - Francis Stuart of Cullello, b. 1636
                                      - Archibald Stuart, 1643–1688
                                        - Charles Stuart, d. 1732
                                          - James Stuart of Binend, 1716–1777
                                            - Charles Stuart of Dunearn, 1745–1826
                                              - James Stuart, 1775–1849
                                    - George Stewart
                                  - Francis Stuart, 1589–1635
                                - Henry Stewart, Lord St Colm
                                - Archibald Stewart
                                - John Stewart, d. 1609
                                - Alexander Stewart
                            - David Stewart
                    - Alexander Stewart, d. 1425
                    - James Mor Stewart, 1400–1429
                  - John Stewart, Earl of Buchan, 1381–1424
                  - Robert Stewart
                - Alexander Stewart, Earl of Buchan, 1343–1394
                - David Stewart, Earl of Strathearn, 1357–1386
                - Walter Stewart, Earl of Atholl, 1360–1437
                  - Alan Stewart, 4th Earl of Caithness, d. 1431
                  - David Stewart, Master of Atholl, d. bef. 1437
                    - Robert Stewart, Master of Atholl, d. 1437
              - John Stewart of Ralston
                - John Stewart
                - Walter Stewart
              - Andrew Stewart
            - John Stewart, d. 1318
            - Andrew Stewart
            - James Stewart, fl. 1327
          - John Stewart, d. 1298
            - Alexander Stewart of Bonkyll, 1271–1319
              - John Stewart, 1st Earl of Angus, d. 1331
                - Thomas Stewart, 2nd Earl of Angus, d. 1361
            - Alan Stewart of Dreghorn, d. 1333
              - Alexander Stewart of Darnley, d. 1374
                - Alexander Stewart of Darnley, d. 1404
                  - John Stewart of Darnley, 1380–1429
                    - Alan Stewart of Darnley, 1406–1439
                      - John Stewart, 1st Earl of Lennox, 1430–1495
                        - Matthew Stewart, 2nd Earl of Lennox, 1460–1513
                          - Mungo Stewart
                          - John Stewart, 3rd Earl of Lennox, 1490–1526
                            - Matthew Stewart, 4th Earl of Lennox, 1516–1571
                              - Henry Stuart, Lord Darnley, 1546–1567
                                - James VI and I, 1566–1625
                                  - Henry Frederick, Prince of Wales, 1594–1612
                                  - Charles I of England, 1600–1649
                                    - Charles II of England, 1630–1685
                                    - James II of England, 1633–1701
                                      - James Francis Edward Stuart, 1688–1766
                                        - Charles Edward Stuart, 1720–1788
                                        - Henry Benedict Stuart, 1725–1807
                                    - Henry Stuart, Duke of Gloucester, 1640–1660
                              - Charles Stuart, 5th Earl of Lennox, 1557–1576
                            - Robert Stewart, 1st Earl of March, 1522–1586
                            - John Stewart, 6th Seigneur d'Aubigny, d. c. 1567
                              - Esmé Stewart, 1st Duke of Lennox, 1542–1583
                                - Ludovic Stewart, 2nd Duke of Lennox, 1574–1624
                                - Esmé Stewart, 3rd Duke of Lennox, 1579–1624
                                  - James Stewart, 1st Duke of Richmond, 1612–1655
                                    - Esmé Stewart, 2nd Duke of Richmond, 1649–1660
                                  - Henry Stewart, 8th Seigneur d'Aubigny, 1616–1632
                                  - George Stewart, 9th Seigneur d'Aubigny, 1618–1642
                                    - Charles Stewart, 3rd Duke of Richmond, 1639–1672
                                  - Ludovic Stewart, 11th Seigneur d'Aubigny, 1619–1665
                                  - Lord John Stewart, 1621–1644
                                  - Lord Bernard Stewart, 1623–1645
                        - Robert Stewart, 5th Lord of Aubigny, 1470–1544
                        - John Stewart, Seigneur d'Oison, d. c. 1512
                        - William Stewart, Seigneur d'Oison, d. bef. 1504
                      - Alexander Stewart of Galston
                    - John Stewart, 2nd Lord of Aubigny, d. 1482
                      - Bernard Stewart, 3rd Lord of Aubigny, 1452–1508
                    - Alexander Stewart of Darnley
                  - William Stewart of Jedsworth, d. 1402
                    - John Stewart, 1st of Garlies, d. 1419/20
                      - Wiliam Stewart, 2nd of Garlies, d. 1479
                        - Alexander Stewart, 3rd of Garlies, d. 1500
                          - Alexander Stewart, 4th of Garlies, d. 1513
                            - Alexander Stewart, 5th of Garlies, 1507–1581
                              - Alexander Stewart, d. 1571
                                - Alexander Stewart, 6th of Garlies, d. 1596
                                  - Alexander Stewart, 1st Earl of Galloway, 1580–1649
                                    - James Stewart, 2nd Earl of Galloway, 1610–1671
                                      - Alexander Stewart, 3rd Earl of Galloway, 1643–1690
                                        - Alexander Stewart, 4th Earl of Galloway, 1670–1694
                                        - James Stewart, 5th Earl of Galloway, d.1746
                                          - Alexander Stewart, 6th Earl of Galloway, 1694–1773
                                            - Alexander Stewart, Master of Garlies, 1719–1738
                                            - John Stewart, 7th Earl of Galloway, 1736–1806
                                              - George Stewart, 8th Earl of Galloway, 1768–1834
                                                - Randolph Stewart, 9th Earl of Galloway, 1800–1873
                                                  - Alan Stewart, 10th Earl of Galloway, 1835–1901
                                                  - Randolph Stewart, 11th Earl of Galloway, 1836–1920
                                                    - Randolph Stewart, 12th Earl of Galloway, 1892–1978
                                                      - Randolph Stewart, 13th Earl of Galloway, 1928–2020
                                                    - Keith Stewart, 1894–1915
                                                  - Alexander Stewart, 1838–1896
                                                    - Walter Stewart, 1888–1918
                                                      - Alexander Stewart, 1914–1985
                                                        - Andrew Stewart, 14th Earl of Galloway, b. 1949
                                                          - Alexander Stewart, Lord Garlies, b. 1980
                                                        - David Stewart, b. 1960
                                                          - Samuel Stewart, b. 1990
                                                          - Harry Stewart, b. 1992
                                                          - Jack Stewart, b. 1999
                                                      - Ian Stewart, 1917–1973
                                                        - Alastair Stewart, b. 1944
                                                          - James Stewart, b. 1975
                                                  - FitzRoy Stewart, 1855–1914
                                                - Admiral Keith Stewart, 1814–1879
                                              - William Stewart, 1774–1827
                                                - Horatio Stewart, 1806–1835
                                                  - Horatio Murray-Stewart, 1834–1904
                                              - Charles Stewart, Bishop of Quebec, 1775–1837
                                              - Montgomery Stewart, 1780–1860
                                                - Alexander Stewart, 1808–1837
                                                - James Stewart, 1819–1895
                                                  - Montgomery Stewart, 1863–1895
                                                  - Frederick Stewart, 1865–1930
                                                  - Herbert Stewart, 1866–1960
                                                  - Douglas Stewart, 1869–1888
                                                  - Percy Stewart, 1871–1962
                                                  - Archibald Stewart, 1874–1930
                                                  - Horatio Stewart, 1877–1943
                                                  - Arthur Stewart, 1879–1967
                                              - Edward Richard Stewart, 1782–1851
                                                - Edward Stewart, 1808–1875
                                                  - Herbert Stewart, 1843–1885
                                                    - Geoffrey Stewart, 1878–1914
                                                      - Malise Stewart, 1911–1974
                                                  - William Stewart, 1847–1883
                                              - James Henry Keith Stewart, 1783–1836
                                            - George Stewart, d. 1758
                                            - Keith Stewart, 1739–1795
                                              - Archibald Stewart, d. 1795
                                              - James Alexander Stewart-Mackenzie, 1784–1843
                                                - Keith Stewart-MacKenzie, 1818–1881
                                                  - James Stewart-Mackenzie, 1st Baron Seaforth, 1847–1923
                                                - George Stewart-Mackenzie, 1824–1852
                                              - Leveson Stewart, 1786–1819
                  - Alexander Stewart of Torbane and Galston
                  - Robert Stewart of Newtoun and Westoun
                  - James Stewart
                  - William Stewart of Castlemilk, d. 1429
              - John Stewart of Cruikston and Darnley
              - Walter Stewart
            - Walter Stewart of Garlies
            - James Stewart of Pearston, d. 1333
              - Lords of Lorne, Earls of Atholl, Earls of Buchan, Earls of Traquair and Clan Stewart of Appin
            - John Stewart of Daldon, d. 1333
            - Robert Stewart of Daldowie,
              - Steuart baronets and Seton-Steuart baronets
            - Hugh Stewart
        - Robert Stewart
        - John Stewart, d. 1249
              - Walter Bailloch, 1230–1293
          - Alexander, Earl of Menteith, d. bef. 1306
            - Alan, Earl of Menteith, d. 1310
              - Alan II, Earl of Menteith, d. bef. 1323
            - Peter Stewart
            - Muireadhach III, Earl of Menteith, d. 1332
            - Alexander Stewart
          - John de Menteith, 1275–1329
            - John de Menteith
            - Walter Menteith
        - William Stewart
      - Leonard
  - Jordan fitz Alan
  - Simon fitz Alan, fl. 1163

== See also ==
- Jacobitism, for more on the legitimist House of Stuart, following the Glorious Revolution
- John Barbour, the first Stewart court poet and genealogist
- List of Scottish monarchs
- List of British monarchs
- Clan Stewart
- Barony and Castle of Corsehill Stewarton in Ayrshire and the Stuart connection
- Armorial of the House of Stuart

== Sources ==
- King, Edmund (1994). The Anarchy of King Stephen's Reign. Oxford University Press. ISBN 0-19-820364-0.
- Barrow, G. W. S. (2003). The Kingdom of the Scots. Edinburgh: Edinburgh University Press. ISBN 0-7486-1802-3.
- Barrow, G. W. S. (2004). "Stewart family (per. c.1110–c.1350)". Oxford Dictionary of National Biography. Oxford Dictionary of National Biography (online ed.). Oxford University Press. doi:10.1093/ref:odnb/49411. (Subscription, Wikipedia Library access or UK public library membership required.)
- Round, J. Horace (1901). Studies in Peerage and Family History. Westminster, London: Archibald Constable & Co Ltd.

Royal house House of Stuart
Preceded by House of Bruce	Ruling house of the Kingdom of Scotland; 1371–1649	Vacant The Covenanters
Preceded by House of Tudor	Ruling house of the Kingdom of England; 1603–1649	Vacant Commonwealth of England
Vacant The Covenanters	Ruling house of the Kingdom of Scotland; 1660–1694	Vacant House of Orange-Nassau
Vacant Commonwealth of England	Ruling house of the Kingdom of England; 1660–1694	Vacant House of Orange-Nassau
Vacant House of Orange-Nassau	Ruling house of the Kingdom of Scotland; 1702–1707	Titles merged by the Acts of Union 1707
Vacant House of Orange-Nassau	Ruling house of the Kingdom of England; 1702–1707	Titles merged by the Acts of Union 1707
New title England and Scotland united	Ruling house of the Kingdom of Great Britain; 1707–1714	Succeeded by House of Hanover
