= Armorial of the House of Stuart =

The House of Stuart is a noble family of Scottish origin that eventually became monarchs of Scotland, England, Ireland, and Great Britain.

== Clan Stewart ==
Figure	Name of armiger and blazon
	Stewart (Clan Stewart) Or, a fess chequy argent and azure of three rows.

== House of Stuart ==
=== Senior branch ===
Figure	Name of armiger and blazon
	Robert II of Scotland (1316 – 19 April 1390), King of Scotland, Or, a lion gules within a double tressure flory counter-flory of the same, armed and langued azure (Scotland).
	David Stuart (born 1356), Earl of Strathearn and Earl of Caithness, son of preceding, Or, a lion gules within a double tressure flory counter-flory of the same, armed and langued azure (Scotland), a chevron gules, brochant, a fess chequy argent and azure brochant sur-le-tout (Stuart).
	John Stuart (v. 1337 – 4 April 1406), Earl of Carrick, future Robert III of Scotland, Or, a lion gules within a double tressure flory counter-flory of the same, armed and langued azure (Scotland), a label argent, each point chequy azure and argent.
	Alexander Stuart (30 April 1514, Stirling Castle – 18 December 1515, Stirling Castle), Duke of Ross, son of James IV of Scotland, Or, a lion gules within a double tressure flory counter-flory of the same, armed and langued azure (Scotland), a fess chequy argent and azure (Stuart), brochant sur-le-tout.

=== Royal House of Stuart (Stuart-Lennox) ===
Branch issued from the marriage of Marie Stuart and Henry Stuart, Lord Darnley, (7 December 1545 – 9 or 10 February 1567), Baron Darnley, Duke of Albany and King consort of Scotland,

Figure	Name of armiger and blazon
then	James VI Stuart or James I of England (1566–1625), King of Scotland, then King of England, Or, a lion gules within a double tressure flory counter-flory of the same, armed and langued azure (Scotland), a label argent. Then, Quarterly, I and IV grandquarterly: 1 and 4 azure three fleurs de lys or (France modern) and 2 and 3 gules three lions passant guardant or (England); II or, a lion gules, double tressure flory and counter-flory of the same (Scotland) and III azure, a harp or, stringed argent (Ireland). And for Scotland: Quarterly, First and Fourth Or a lion rampant within a double tressure flory counter-flory Gules (for Scotland); Second quarterly, First and Fourth Azure three fleurs de lys Or (for France), Second and Third Gules three lions passant guardant in pale Or armed and langued Azure (for England); Third quarter Azure a harp Or stringed Argent (for Ireland)
	Charles Stuart (1630–1685), Prince of Wales, Duke of Cornwall and Duke of Rothesay, future Charles II of England, Quarterly, I and IV grandquarterly: 1 and 4 azure three fleurs de lys or and 2 and 3 gules three lions passant guardant or; II or, a lion gules, double tressure flory and counter-flory of the same and III azure, a harp or, stringed argent; overall a label argent.
	James Stuart (1633–1701), Duke of York, Duke of Albany, future James II of England, Quarterly, I and IV grandquarterly: 1 and 4 azure three fleurs de lys or and 2 and 3 gules three lions passant guardant or; II or, a lion gules, double tressure flory and counter-flory of the same and III azure, a harp or, stringed argent; overall a label argent, on each point three ermine spots sable..
	Henry Stuart (1640–1660), Duke of Gloucester, Earl of Cambridge Quarterly, I and IV grandquarterly: 1 and 4 azure three fleurs de lys or and 2 and 3 gules three lions passant guardant or; II or, a lion gules, double tressure flory and counter-flory of the same and III azure, a harp or, stringed argent; overall a label argent, on each point three roses gules.
	Mary II Stuart, Queen of England and Ireland, Per pale: 1 quarterly, I and IV grandquarterly: 1 and 4 azure three fleurs de lys or and 2 and 3 gules three lions passant guardant or; II or, a lion gules, double tressure flory and counter-flory of the same and III azure, a harp or, stringed argent; sur le tout azure semy of billets or, a lion of the second brochant, armed and langued gules (Nassau); 2 quarterly, I and IV grandquarterly: 1 and 4 azure three fleurs de lys or and 2 and 3 gules three lions passant guardant or; II or, a lion gules, double tressure flory and counter-flory of the same and III azure, a harp or, stringed argent.
	Anne Stuart, Queen of Great Britain, Quarterly, I and IV Per pale: 1 gules three lions passant guardant or, 2 or, a lion gules, double tressure flory and counter-flory of the same; II azure three fleurs de lys or; III azure, a harp or, stringed argent.

=== Branches descended from Charles II of England ===
==== House Scott of Buccleuch ====
Branch descended from James Crofts, illegitimate son of Lucy Walter and of Charles II of England,

Figure	Name of armiger and blazon
	James Crofts then James Scott (1 April 1649, Rotterdam –15 July 1685), 1st duke of Monmouth, 1st duke of Buccleuch, illegitimate son of Charles II of England and of his mistress, Lucy Walter, who had followed the king in exile on the continent after execution of Charles I. Quarterly: I and IV grandquarterly azure three fleurs de lys or France and gules three lions passant guardant or (England); II or, a lion gules, double tressure flory and counter-flory of the same (Scotland); III azure, a harp or, stringed argent (Ireland); a baton sinister couped argent brochant, sur le tout or a bend azure charged with a mullet of six points and two crescents, one in base, the other in chief of the bend, all of the first (Scott).: Arms then used by: The 1st and 2nd dukes of Buccleuch,
	Henry Scott, (2 September 1746 – 11 January 1812), 3rd Duke of Buccleuch and 5th Duke of Queensberry etc., son of preceding and of Caroline Townshend, 1st Baroness Greenwich. Grand-Quarterly: I and IV quarterly: A and D grandquarterly : 1 and 4 azure three fleurs de lys or (France) 2 and 3 gules three lions passant guardant or (England); B or, a lion gules, double tressure flory and counter-flory of the same (Scotland); C azure, a harp or, stringed argent (Ireland); a baton sinister couped argent brochant; II and III or a bend azure charged with a mullet of six points and two crescents, one in base, the other in chief of the bend, all of the first (Scott).
	Charles William Henry Montagu-Scott (24 May 1772 – 20 April 1819), 4th duke of Buccleuch and 6th duke of Queensberry, etc., son of preceding and of Lady Elizabeth Montagu. Grand-Quarterly: I and IV quarterly: A and D grandquarterly : 1 and 4 azure three fleurs de lys or (France) 2 and 3 gules three lions passant guardant or (England); B or, a lion gules, double tressure flory and counter-flory of the same (Scotland); C azure, a harp or, stringed argent (Ireland); a baton sinister couped argent brochant; II or a bend azure charged with a mullet of six points and two crescents, one in base, the other in chief of the bend, all of the first (Scott); III: quarterly: A and D argent three fusils palewise conjoined gules, a bordure sable, B and C or, an eagle displayed vert armed and langued gules (Montagu).
	Walter Montagu-Douglas-Scott (25 November 1806 – 16 April 1884), 5th duke of Buccleuch and 7th duke of Queensberry, etc., son of preceding and of Harriet Katherine Townshend, daughter of Thomas Townshend, 1st Viscount Sydney, Grand-quarterly: I quarterly: A and D grandquarterly : 1 and 4 azure three fleurs de lys or (France) 2 and 3 gules three lions passant guardant or (England); B or, a lion gules, double tressure flory and counter-flory of the same (Scotland); C azure, a harp or, stringed argent (Ireland); a baton sinister couped argent brochant; II or a bend azure charged with a mullet of six points and two crescents, one in base, the other in chief of the bend, all of the first (Scott); III quarterly: A and D argent a heart gules crowned with a closed crown or, a chief azure charged with three estoiles argent (Douglas); B and C azure, a bend or, accompanied by six cross crosslets foot fitchy or, in orle (Mar); le tout a bordure or double tressure flory and counter-flory gules, IV quarterly: A and D argent three fusils palewise conjoined gules, a bordure sable, B and C or, an eagle displayed vert armed and langued gules (Montagu).; Arms then used by: The 5th, 6th and 7th dukes of Buccleuch,
	Walter Montagu-Douglas-Scott (30 December 1894 – 4 October 1973), 8th duke of Buccleuch and 10th duke of Queensberry, etc., son of preceding and of Margaret Bridgeman, daughter of George Bridgeman, 4th Earl of Bradford, Grand-quarterly: I quarterly: A and D grandquarterly : 1 and 4 azure three fleurs de lys or France and 2 and gules three lions passant guardant or (England); B or, a lion gules, double tressure flory and counter-flory of the same (Scotland); C azure, a harp or, stringed argent (Ireland); a baton sinister couped argent brochant, II Quarterly, A and D gyronny of eight or and sable (Campbell); B and C argent, a lymphad or ancient galley sails furled flags and pennants flying gules and oars in action sable (Lorne), III quarterly: A and D argent a heart gules crowned with a closed crown or, a chief azure charged with three estoiles argent (Douglas); B and C azure, a bend or, accompanied by six cross crosslets foot fitchy or, in orle (Mar); le tout a bordure or double tressure flory and counter-flory gules, IV quarterly: A argent three fusils palewise conjoined gules, a bordure sable; B or, an eagle displayed vert armed and langued gules (Montagu), C of sable, au lion argent, armed and langued gules, on a franc-canton a cross of Saint George (Churchill), D argent a chevron gules accompanied by three helmets of Conquistadors azure (Brudenell).; Sur le tout or a bend azure charged with a mullet of six points and two crescents, one in base, the other in chief of the bend, all of the first (Scott).; Arms then used by: The dukes of Buccleuch

==== House FitzCharles of Plymouth ====
Figure	Name of armiger and blazon
	Charles FitzCharles (1657–1680), 1st Earl of Plymouth, natural son of Charles II of England Quarterly: I and IV grandquarterly azure three fleurs de lys or (France modern) and gules three lions passant guardant or (England); II or, a lion gules, double tressure flory and counter-flory of the same (Scotland); III azure, a harp or, stringed argent (Ireland); a baton sinister vair.

==== House FitzRoy of Grafton ====
Branch descended Charles II of England and his mistress Barbara Palmer

Figure	Name of armiger and blazon
	Charles Fitzroy (1662–1730), future duke of Southampton (1675), duke of Cleveland (1709) Quarterly: I and IV grandquarterly azure three fleurs de lys or (France) and gules three lions passant guardant or (England); II or, a lion gules, double tressure flory and counter-flory of the same (Scotland); III azure, a harp or, stringed argent (Ireland); a baton sinister argent charged of six ermine spots sable.
	Henri Charles FitzRoy (1663–1690), 1st Duke of Grafton, 1st earl Euston, 1st Viscount Ipswich, 1st Baron Sudbury, Quarterly: I and IV grandquarterly azure three fleurs de lys or (France) and gules three lions passant guardant or (England); II or, a lion gules, double tressure flory and counter-flory of the same (Scotland); III azure, a harp or, stringed argent (Ireland); a baton sinister couped azure compony argent of six pieces.: Arms then used by: The dukes of Grafton,
	George Fitzroy (1665–1716), future earl of Northumberland (1674), duke of Northumberland (1683), childless, Quarterly: I and IV grandquarterly azure three fleurs de lys or (France) and gules three lions passant guardant or (England); II or, a lion gules, double tressure flory and counter-flory of the same (Scotland); III azure, a harp or, stringed argent (Ireland); a baton sinister couped azure compony argent of six pieces, each piece argent charged with an ermine spot sable.

==== House Beauclerk of St Albans ====
Branch descended from Charles Beauclerk, illegitimate son of Nell Gwynne, mistress of Charles II of England,

Figure	Name of armiger and blazon
	Charles Beauclerk (1670–1726), 1st Duke of St Albans, earl of Burford and Baron of Heddington, Quarterly: I and IV, grandquarterly azure three fleurs de lys or (France modern) and gules three lions passant guardant or (England); II, or, a lion gules, double tressure flory and counter-flory of the same (Scotland); III, a harp or, stringed argent (Ireland); a baton sinister couped gules, charged with three roses argent, seeded and barbed vert, brochant sur-le-tout.
	Charles Beauclerk (1696–1751), 2nd Duke of St Albans, earl of Burford and Baron of Heddington, Hereditary Grand Falconer of England, son of preceding, Grand-Quarterly: A and D, of Beauclerk: quarterly: I and IV, grandquarterly azure three fleurs de lys or (France modern) and gules three lions passant guardant or (England); II, or, a lion gules, double tressure flory and counter-flory of the same (Scotland); III, a harp or, stringed argent (Ireland); a baton sinister couped gules, charged with three roses argent, seeded and barbed vert, brochant sur-le-tout; C and D de Vere: quarterly gules and or, a mullet argent on the first quarterargent.: Arms then used by : The dukes of Saint-Albans.

==== House Lennox of Richmond ====
Branch descended from Charles Lennox, natural son of Charles II of England,

Figure	Name of armiger and blazon
	Charles Lennox (1672–1723), 1st duke of Richmond (2nd creation), 1st duke of Lennox, duke of Aubigny. Quarterly: I and IV grandquarterly azure three fleurs de lys or (France modern) and gules three lions passant guardant or (England); II or, a lion gules, double tressure flory and counter-flory of the same (Scotland); III azure, a harp or, stringed argent (Ireland); a bordure compony of sixteen pieces argent and gules, each piece argent charged with a rose seeded or and barbed vert (Lennox).: Arms then used by: Charles Lennox (1701–1750), son of preceding, 2nd duke of Richmond, 2nd duke of Lennox, Earl of Darnley, duke of Aubigny, Charles Lennox, 3rd Duke of Richmond (1735–1806), son of preceding, 3rd Duke of Richmond, Baron Settingdon and earl of March, 3rd Duke of Lennox, Baron Torbolton and Earl of Darnley, Duke of Aubigny,
	Charles Lennox (1764–1819), nephew of preceding, 4th Duke of Richmond, Baron Settingdon and Earl of March, 4th Duke of Lennox, Baron Torbolton and Earl of Darnley, Duke of Aubigny, Quarterly: I and IV grandquarterly azure three fleurs de lys or (France) and gules three lions passant guardant or (England); II or, a lion gules, double tressure flory and counter-flory of the same (Scotland); III azure, a harp or, stringed argent (Ireland); a bordure compony of sixteen pieces argent and gules, each piece argent charged with a rose seeded or and barbed vert (Lennox); sur le tout gules three buckles or (Aubigny).
	Charles Gordon-Lennox (1791–1860), nephew of preceding, 5th Duke of Richmond, Baron Settingdon and Earl of March, 5th Duke of Lennox, Baron Torbolton and Earl of Darnley, Duke of Aubigny, Grand-quarterly: I and IV grandquarterly azure three fleurs de lys or (France) and gules three lions passant guardant or (England); II or, a lion gules, double tressure flory and counter-flory of the same (Scotland); III azure, a harp or, stringed argent (Ireland); a bordure compony of sixteen pieces argent and gules, each piece argent charged with a rose seeded or and barbed vert (Lennox); sur le tout gules three buckles or (Aubigny); II and III of the grand-quarterly: quarterly I azure three boar's heads or armed gules (Gordon); II or three heads of lion erased gules langued azure (Badenoch); III or, three crescents gules, double tressure flory and counter-flory of the same (Seton); IV azure three cinquefoils or seeded of the field (Fraser).: Arms then used by: The Dukes of Richmond, Dukes of Lennox and Dukes of Aubigny

=== Branch descended from James II of England ===
==== House of FitzJames ====
Branch descended from James FitzJames, 1st Duke of Berwick, natural son of James II of England,

Figure	Name of armiger and blazon
	James FitzJames (Moulins, 21 August 1670 – 12 June 1734), natural son of James II Stuart, King of England and of Arabella Churchill, sister of John Churchill, duke of Marlborough, 1st Duke of Berwick, 1st earl of Tinmouth, 1st baron of Bosworth, Duke of Liria and Xerica and Grandee of Spain, Duke of Fitz-James and peer of France, Knight of the Order of the Garter (1688, brevet n°498), Knight of the Golden Fleece (1704, brevet n°636), Knight of the Holy Spirit (received 7 June 1724) Quarterly: I and IV grandquarterly azure three fleurs de lys or (France) and gules three lions passant guardant or (England); II or, a lion gules, double tressure flory and counter-flory of the same (Scotland); III azure, a harp or, stringed argent (Ireland); a bordure compony of twelve pieces azure and gules, each piece azure charged with a fleur-de-lys and each piece gules charged with a lion passant guardant or.: Arms then used by: The dukes of Fitz-James
	Charles Michel Fitz-James (1794–1835), 14th Duke of Alba (1802) and Grandee of Spain, Duke of Liria and Xerica, Duke of Berwick, Arms then used by: The dukes of Alba

=== Stuart of Albany ===
Branch descended from Robert Stuart, Duke of Albany, son of Robert II of Scotland.

Figure	Name of armiger and blazon
	Robert (circa 1340 – 3 September 1420 - Stirling), Duke of Albany, Quarterly: I and IV or a lion gules a label azure in chief, II and III or, a fess chequy argent and azure a label azure in chief.
	Murdoch Stuart (1362–1425), Duke of Albany, son of preceding, Quarterly: I and IV or, a lion gules, double tressure flory and counter-flory of the same (Scotland) a bordure azure and argent compony of twelve pieces, II or, a fess chequy azure and argent, and III or three lozenges pommety gules double tressure flory and counter-flory of the same.
	Alexander Stuart (died before 2 June 1489), Lord Avandale, great-grandson of preceding, Quarterly: I or, a lion gules armed and langued azure, double tressure flory and counter-flory of the same (Scotland), II or, a fess chequy azure and argent, III argent, a saltire gules, between four roses of the same, seeded or and barbed vert (Lennox), IV or a lion gules armed and langued azure, a bordure azure and argent compony of twelve pieces.
	Andrew Stuart, 1st Lord Ochiltree, grandson of preceding, Quarterly: I and IV or, a lion gules armed and langued azure, double tressure flory and counter-flory of the same (Scotland), II or, a fess chequy argent and azure a bordure azure and argent compony of twelve pieces a label gules, III argent, a saltire gules, between four roses of the same, seeded or and barbed vert (Lennox), a bordure azure and argent compony of twelve pieces.
	James Stuart (assassinated 5 December 1595), Earl of Arran, son of preceding, Grand quarterly: A and D, quarterly: I and IV or, a lion gules armed and langued azure, double tressure flory and counter-flory of the same (Scotland), II or, a fess chequy argent and azure a bordure azure and argent compony of twelve pieces a label gules, III argent, a saltire gules, between four roses of the same, seeded or and barbed vert (Lennox), a bordure azure and argent compony of twelve pieces; B and C, quarterly: I and IV gules three cinquefoils argent, each leaf charged with an ermine spot sable, II and III, argent a lymphad with the sails furled sable flagged gules (Hamilton).
	Alexander Stuart (born around 1557), 1st Lord of Ardvorlich, descendant of James Stuart, fourth son of Murdoch Stuart, who had fled to Ireland, Quarterly: I and IV or, a lion gules armed and langued azure, double tressure flory and counter-flory of the same (Scotland), II or, a fess chequy argent and azure in chief a mullet gules, III argent, a saltire gules, between four roses of the same, seeded or and barbed vert (Lennox), a bordure azure and argent engrailed and compony of twelve pieces.

=== Stuart of Darnley ===
Figure	Name of armiger and blazon
	John Stuart of Darnley, Seneschal, Or, a fess chequy azure and argent, a baton gules.
	Alexander Stuart, 1st Earl of Buchan, Or, a fess chequy argent and azure.
	John Stuart (circa 1381 – 17 August 1424), Lord Darnley, 1st Lord of Aubigny, Lord of Concressault and Count of Evreux, Quarterly: I and IV azure three fleurs de lys or, a bordure gules with eight buckles or; II and III or, a fess chequy argent and azure of three rows (Stuart) a cottice gules.
	Lord Darnley (29 July 1565 – 10 February 1567), King consort of Scots to Queen Mary, Duke of Albany, Lord of Darnley,

=== Earls, then Dukes of Lennox ===
Figure	Name of armiger and blazon
	John Stewart (died 1495), 1st Earl of Lennox (1473 – 2nd creation (Note: Earldom granted by King James I)), Baron of Tolborton, grandson of preceding, Quarterly: I and IV azure three fleurs de lys or, a bordure gules with eight buckles or; II and III or, a fess chequy argent and azure of three rows (Stuart) a bordure engrailed gules; sur le tout argent, a saltire gules, between four roses of the same, seeded or and barbed vert (Lennox).: Arms then used by : Matthew Stewart (died 1513), 2nd Earl of Lennox (1495), Baron of Tolborton, son of preceding, John Stewart (died 1526), 3rd Earl of Lennox (1513), Baron of Tolborton, son of preceding, Matthew Stewart (1516–1571), 4th Earl of Lennox (1526), Baron of Tolborton, son of preceding, Charles Stuart (1555–1576), 5th Earl of Lennox (1571), son of preceding, Robert Stuart (1516–1586), 1st Earl of Lennox (1576), uncle of preceding,
	Esmé Stewart (1542–1583), 7th Earl of Lennox (1580), then 1st duke of Lennox (1581–creation), earl of Darnley, Quarterly: I and IV azure three fleurs de lys or, a bordure engrailed or; II and III or, a fess chequy argent and azure of three rows (Stuart) a bordure gules with eight buckles or; sur le tout argent, a saltire gules, between four roses of the same, seeded or and barbed vert (Lennox).: Arms then used by : Ludovic Stewart (1574–1623), 2nd duke of Lennox (1583), 1st earl of Richmond (eleventh creation (1613)) then 1st duke of Richmond (1623), son of preceding, Esmé Stewart (1579–1624), 3rd duke of Lennox (1623), brother of preceding, James Stewart (1612–1655), 4th duke of Lennox (1624), son of preceding, 1st duke of Richmond (2nd creation – 1641), Esmé Stewart (1649–1660), 5th duke of Lennox (1655), 2nd duke of Richmond, son of preceding, Charles Stewart (1639–1672), 6th duke of Lennox (1660), 3rd duke of Richmond, first cousin of preceding,

=== Stuart of Bute ===
Figure	Name of armiger and blazon
	James Stuart of Bute, (deceased 4 June 1710), 3rd Baronet Stuart of Ardmaleish, 1st earl of Bute (1703), Quarterly: I and IV or, a fess chequy argent and azure of three rows, double tressure flory and counter-flory gules, II and III argent a lion gules armed and langued azure.
	John Stuart of Bute (25 May 1713 – 10 March 1792), 3rd Earl of Bute, minister of State and Prime Minister of Great Britain from 1762 to 1763. Or, a fess chequy argent and azure of three rows, within a double tressure flory and counter-flory gules.

=== Other branches ===
Figure	Armiger and Blazon
	Stewart earl of Galloway, Branch descended from Alexander Stewart (deceased 1649), 1st earl of Galloway, Or, a fess chequy argent and azure of three rows, double tressure flory and counter-flory gules, a bend engrailed of the same.
	barons Stewart of Rothesay Or, a fess chequy argent and azure of three rows in chief a mullet argent, double tressure flory and counter-flory gules.
	Stewart of Atholl, Quarterly or a fess chequy argent and azure (Stewart) and or three pallets sable (Earl of Atholl). Arms used by: John Stewart (1440 – 15 September 1512, Laighwood), 1st earl of Atholl,
	Stewart of Barclye, Or a fess chequy argent and azure, a bend engrailed gules brochant in chief a mullet of the same.
	Stewart of Garlies, Or, a fess chequy argent and azure of three rows, a bend engrailed gules brochant.
	Stewart of Minto, Or a fess chequy argent and azure, a bend engrailed gules brochant in chief a rose of the same.
	Stewart of Physgill, Or a fess chequy argent and azure, a bend engrailed brochant gules charged in chief with a buckle of the field.
	Lords Blantyre, Branch descended from Walter Stewart (deceased 8 Mars 1617), 1st Lord Blantyre (1606), Argent, a fess chequy argent and azure of three rows in chief a mullet of the second, a bend engrailed gules, in chief a rose of the same seeded and barbed or.

== See also ==
- House of Stuart
