= Duke of Aubigny =

French peerage held by British noble

Dukedom of Aubigny
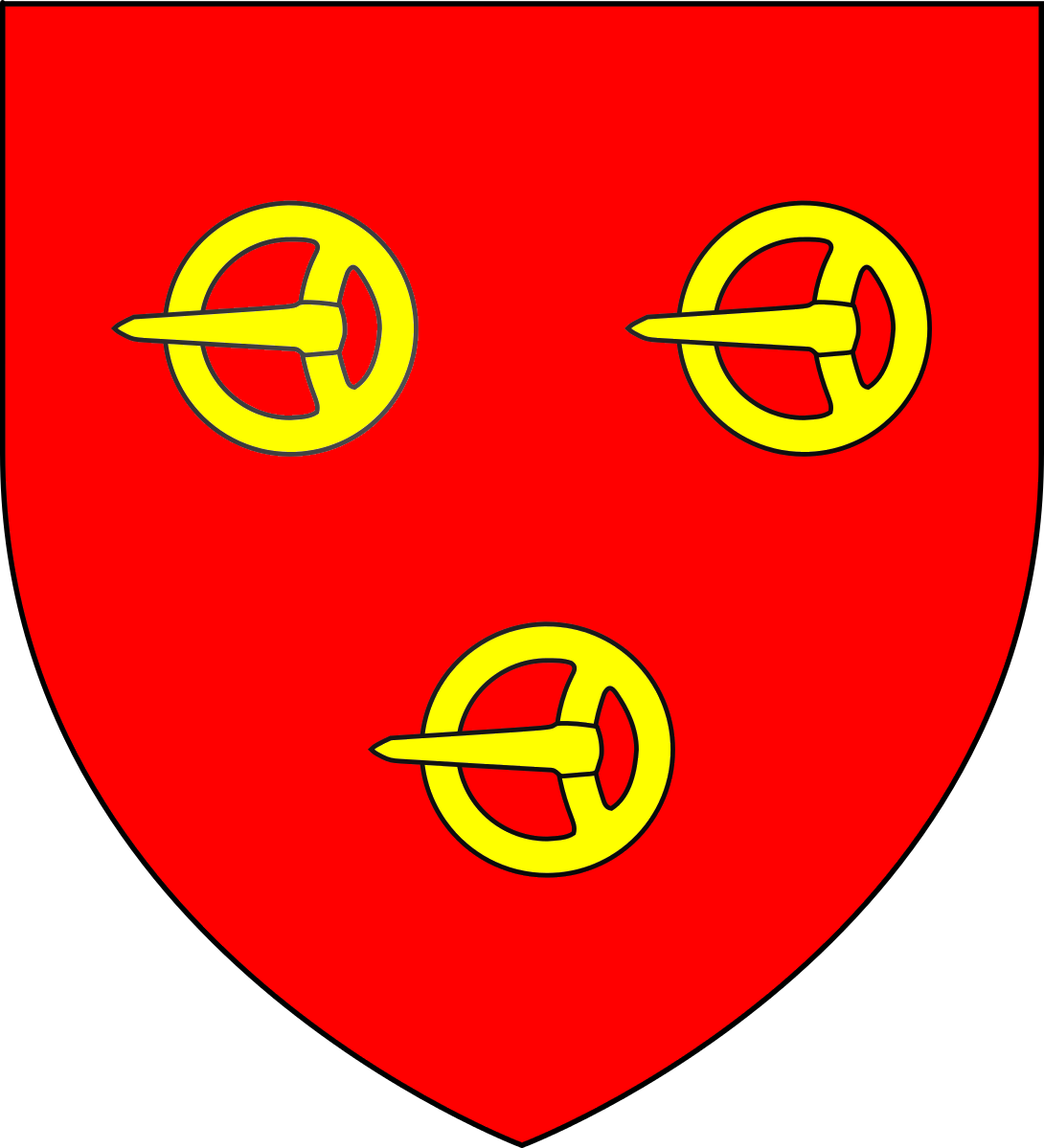
- Creation date: 1684
- Created by: Louis XIV
- Peerage: Peerage of France
- First holder: Louise de Kérouaille, Duchess of Portsmouth
- Present holder: Charles Gordon-Lennox, 11th Duke of Richmond
- Heir apparent: Charles Gordon-Lennox, Earl of March and Kinrara
- Seat: Goodwood House in England
- Former seat: Château d'Aubigny in France

Duke of Aubigny (French: Duc d'Aubigny) is a title that was created in the Peerage of France in 1684. It was granted by King Louis XIV to Louise de Kérouaille, the last mistress of King Charles II of England, and to descend to Charles's illegitimate issue by her, namely to the descendants of Charles Lennox, 1st Duke of Richmond, 1st Duke of Lennox (1672–1723) of Goodwood House in Sussex. Louis XIV also granted her the Château de la Verrerie, a former secondary seat of the Stewart Seigneurs d'Aubigny, Franco-Scottish cousins of the Stewart monarchs, seated from 1422 to 1672 at the Château d'Aubigny in the parish and manor of Aubigny-sur-Nère in the ancient province of Berry in France.

The ducal title, with accompanying grant of arms and of lands, were an attempt by Charles II to place his youngest illegitimate son into the persona of his much beloved and recently extinct Franco-Scottish cousins, the Stewart Seigneurs d'Aubigny, the last in the male line of whom was Charles Stewart, 3rd Duke of Richmond, 6th Duke of Lennox (1639–1672) of Cobham Hall in Kent and of Richmond House in London.

During the Auld Alliance between the Kingdom of Scotland and the Ancien Régime of France, the Château d'Aubigny had been granted in 1422 by King Charles VII of France to Sir John Stewart of Darnley, 1st Comte d'Évreux, 1st Seigneur de Concressault, 1st Seigneur d'Aubigny (c. 1380–1429), a famous military commander who served as Constable of the Scottish Army in France, supporting the French against the English during the Hundred Years War. and a fourth cousin of King James I of Scotland (reigned 1406 to 1437), the third monarch of the House of Stewart. The Stewarts of Darnley were a junior branch of Stewart of Bonkyll, of Bonkyll Castle in Scotland, descended from Alexander Stewart, 4th High Steward of Scotland (died 1283), whose senior great-grandson was King Robert II of Scotland (1371–1390), the first monarch of the House of Stewart.

King James VI and I of Scotland and England united the senior royal line of Stewart (represented by his mother Mary, Queen of Scots) with the junior branch of Stewart of Darnley, as his father (Henry Stewart, Lord Darnley) was that family's senior representative, being the son and heir apparent of Matthew Stewart, 4th Earl of Lennox (1516–1571). King James VI & I inherited the title of Earl of Lennox, as nominal 5th Earl, when that title merged into the crown, as had done the Earldom of Richmond in 1485 on the accession to the throne of Henry Tudor, Earl of Richmond, as King Henry VII of England. These titles were re-granted by the Stewart monarchs to their beloved Franco-Scottish cousins, the Stewarts of Aubigny.

== History ==
Arms awarded in 1427 by King Charles VII of France to Sir John Stewart of Darnley, 1st Seigneur d'Aubigny, 1st Seigneur de Concressault and 1st Comte d'Évreux, Constable of the Scottish Army in France. To quarter Stewart of Darnley: Royal arms of France within a bordure gules charged with eight buckles or.

The lord of the manor of Aubigny-sur-Nère, a substantial walled town, was known in France as the Seigneur d'Aubigny ("lord of Aubigny"). It was a territorial title rather than a peerage title, and thus was able to be given by a Seigneur to a younger son, where for example the elder son already had a great estate and titles.

The first ducal holder was Louise de Kérouaille, the French-born last mistress of King Charles II of England and Scotland. In 1684, at the request of Charles II, the French King Louis XIV created her "Duchess of Aubigny" in the Peerage of France. However, the letters patent creating the Duchy were not registered by the Parlement of Paris, so the dukedom became extinct at the Duchess' death in 1734. In 1777, King Louis XV issued lettres de suranation, which restored the 1684 peerage to her heirs. Charles Lennox, 1st Duke of Richmond and 1st Duke of Lennox (1672–1723), her son by King Charles II, had predeceased her, but her grandson Charles Lennox, 2nd Duke of Richmond, had already received a brevet de duc (i.e., a ducal patent), which gave him the honours of a duke at the French royal court. The French dukedom was confiscated during the Revolutionary and Napoleonic Wars (1792–1803 and 1806–1814), but it was finally returned to Charles Lennox, 4th Duke of Richmond, the nephew and heir of the 3rd Duke of Richmond, who also succeeded to the dukedom of Aubigny according to ancient Salic law.

The English coat of arms of the Lennox Dukes of Richmond display an inescutcheon of gules, three buckles or, which are their French arms as Dukes of Aubigny. These arms were created as a difference from the French arms granted in 1428 by King Charles VII of France to John Stewart of Darnley, 1st Seigneur d'Aubigny, 1st Seigneur de Concressault, 1st Comte d'Évreux, and Constable of the Scottish Army in France, the outstanding warrior who commanded the Scottish army in France that was instrumental in saving the throne of Charles VII from the English invasion forces under King Henry V of England. In 1428, John Stewart of Darnley was awarded by King Charles VII of France "the glorious privilege of quartering the royal arms of France with his paternal arms". This was in the form of the royal French arms differenced by a bordure gules charged with buckles or, specified to appear in the 1st and 4th quarters of greatest honour.

The bordure gules charged with buckles or is a reference to the arms of Stewart of Bonkyll, who bore Stewart differenced by a bordure gules charged with buckles or (an example of canting arms: buckles for Bonkyll).

The château and appurtenances are no longer the family's, as they were sold off to maintain their other legacies or assets. Aubigny is the chief tourist attraction in France which attests to the Auld Alliance. The honour is still recognized in France as are all legitimate titles granted before 1870 by a French monarch.

== Stewart Seigneurs d'Aubigny ==
- John Stewart, 1st Lord of Aubigny (killed 1429)
- John Stewart, 2nd Lord of Aubigny (died 1482)
- Bernard Stewart, 3rd Lord of Aubigny (died 1508)
- Robert Stewart, 4th Lord of Aubigny (died 1543)
- John Stewart, 5th Lord of Aubigny (died 1567)
- Esmé Stewart, 6th Lord of Aubigny (died 1583)
- Esmé Stewart, 7th Lord of Aubigny (died 1624)
- Henry Stewart, 8th Lord of Aubigny (died 1632)
- George Stewart, 9th Lord of Aubigny (killed 1642)
- Ludovic Stewart, 10th Lord of Aubigny (died 1665)
- Charles Stewart, 11th Lord of Aubigny (died 1672)

== Lennox Dukes of Aubigny ==
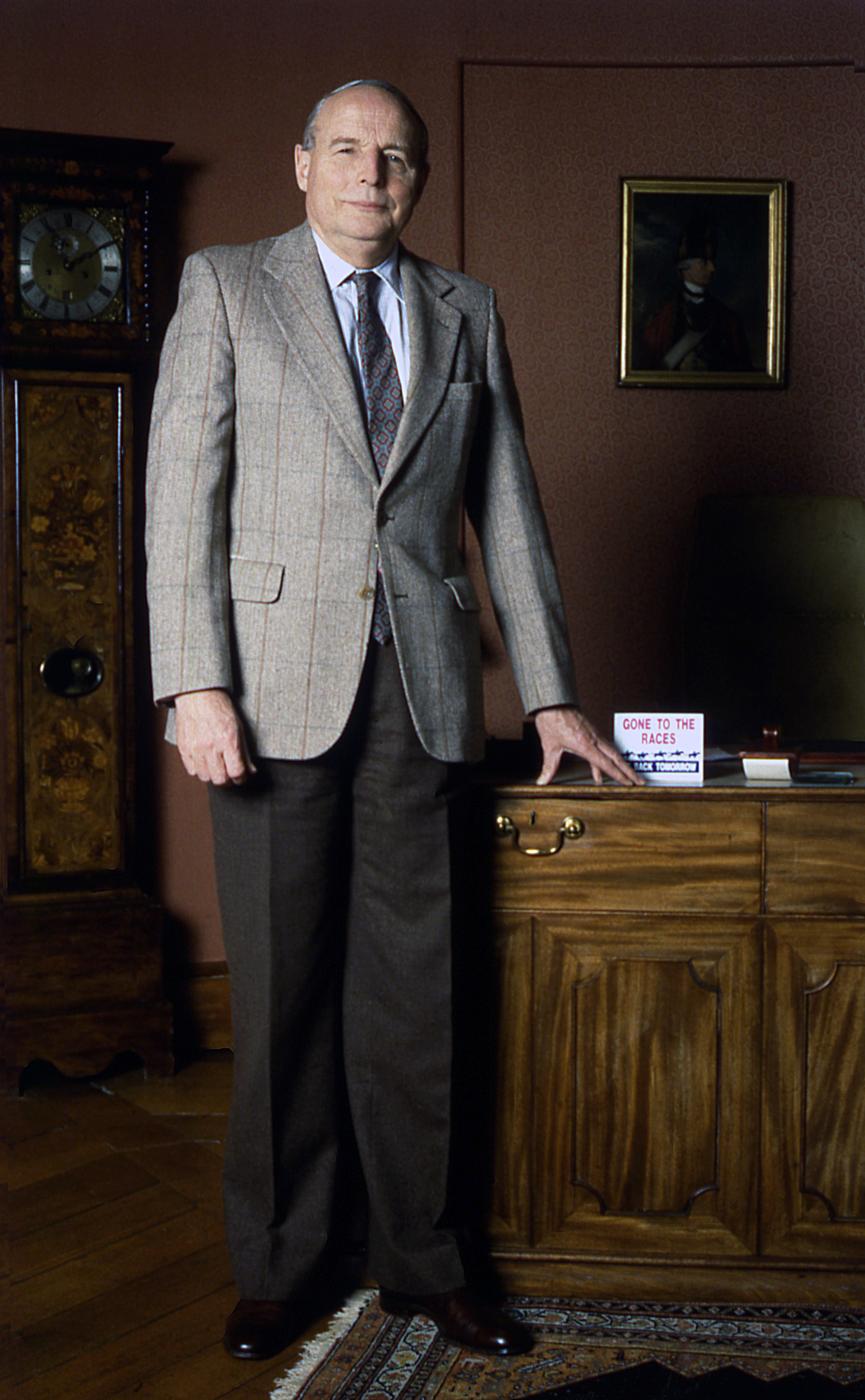
Charles Gordon-Lennox, 10th Duke of Richmond and Duke of Aubigny, by Allan Warren

- Louise de Kérouaille, 1st Duchess of Portsmouth, Duchess of Aubigny (1649–1734). Dukedom and Peerage extinct at her death.
- Charles Lennox, 1st Duke of Richmond, 1st Duke of Lennox, Duke of Aubigny (1672–1723), jointly with his mother Louise de Kéroualle.
- Charles Lennox, 2nd Duke of Richmond, 2nd Duke of Lennox (1701–1750). Only a "Brevet Duke" and not a Duke and Peer.
- Charles Lennox, 3rd Duke of Richmond, 3rd Duke of Lennox, Duke of Aubigny (1734–1806). Restored to Peerage in 1777.
- Charles Lennox, 4th Duke of Richmond, 4th Duke of Lennox, Duke of Aubigny (1764–1819)
- Charles Gordon-Lennox, 5th Duke of Richmond, 5th Duke of Lennox, Duke of Aubigny (1791–1860)
- Charles Gordon-Lennox, 6th Duke of Richmond, 6th Duke of Lennox, Duke of Aubigny, 1st Duke of Gordon (1818–1903)
- Charles Gordon-Lennox, 7th Duke of Richmond, 7th Duke of Lennox, Duke of Aubigny, 2nd Duke of Gordon (1845–1928)
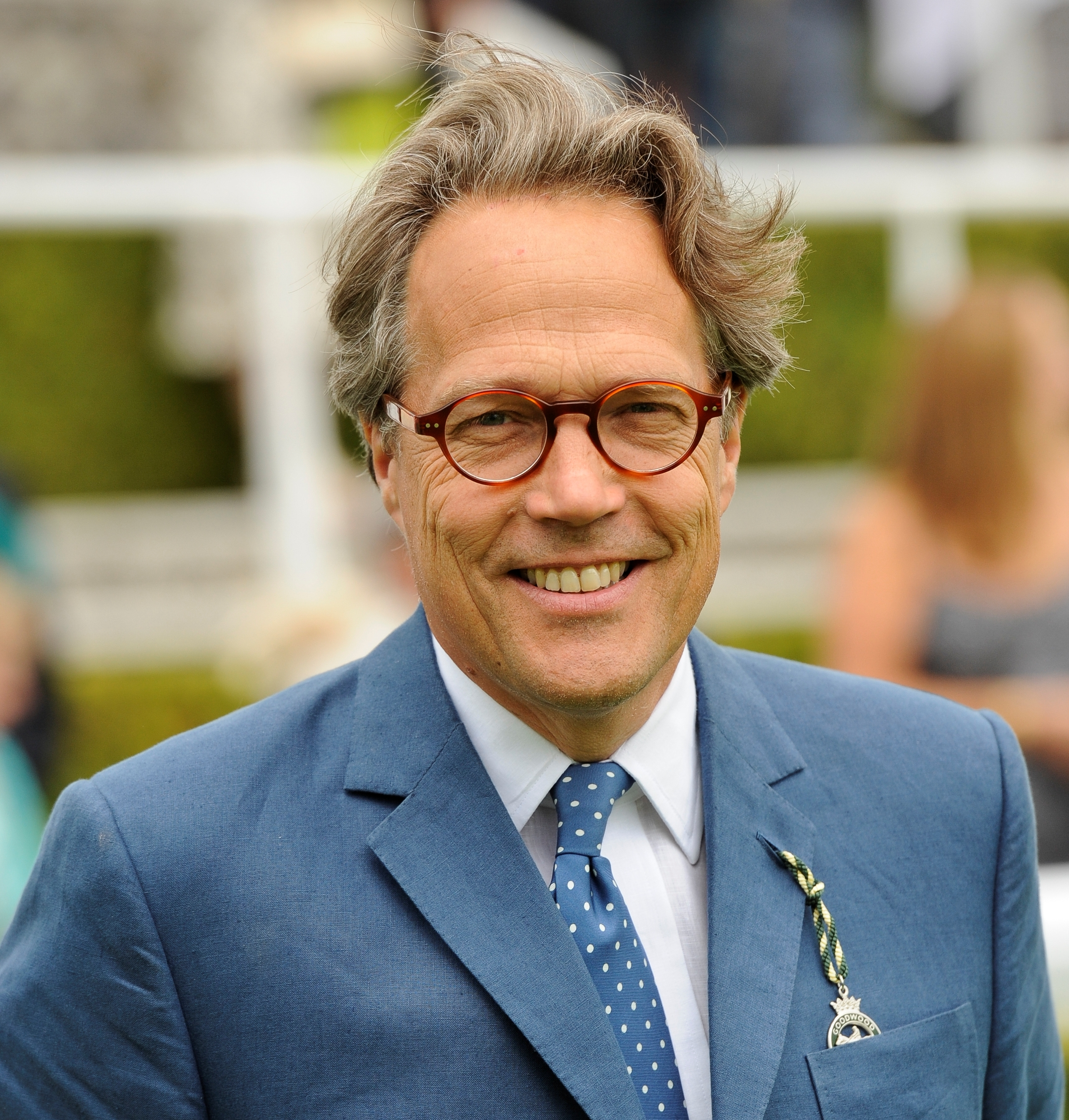
  Charles Gordon-Lennox, 11th Duke of Richmond, 11th Duke of Lennox, Duke of Aubigny
- Charles Gordon-Lennox, 8th Duke of Richmond, 8th Duke of Lennox, Duke of Aubigny, 3rd Duke of Gordon (1870–1935)
- Frederick Gordon-Lennox, 9th Duke of Richmond, 9th Duke of Lennox, Duke of Aubigny, 4th Duke of Gordon (1904–1989)
- Charles Gordon-Lennox, 10th Duke of Richmond, 10th Duke of Lennox, Duke of Aubigny, 5th Duke of Gordon (1929–2017)
- Charles Gordon-Lennox, 11th Duke of Richmond, 11th Duke of Lennox, Duke of Aubigny, 6th Duke of Gordon (b. 1955)

== Family tree ==
Lennox, Richmond, and Gordon family tree including peerages of Aboyne, Aubigny, Enzie, Gordon, Huntly, Inverness, Kinrara, Lennox, March, Meldrum, Richmond, Settrington, and Strathaven, Balmore, Auchindoun, Garthie and Kincardine

Henry of Scotland; 1114–1152; Earl of Northumbria, Earl of Huntingdon
Mormaer of Lennox (1st creation), 12th century
Malcolm IV; 1141–1165; Earl of Huntingdon, later King of Scotland	William I c. 1142–1214; Earl of Huntingdon, later King of Scotland	David; 1152–1219; Mormaer of Lennox, Earl of Huntingdon	Ailín I d. c. 1200 possibly Mormaer of Lennox
Isobel of Huntingdon; 1199–1251	Ailín II d. 1217; Mormaer of Lennox
Robert V de Brus c. 1210–1295	Maol Domhnaich (Maldoven) d. 1250; Mormaer of Lennox	?	Gille Chriosd	Alexander Stewart c. 1214–1283; High Steward of Scotland
Robert VI de Brus; 1243–1304	Maol Choluim (Malcolm) I d. 1303; Mormaer of Lennox	Amlaibh	Clan MacFarlane	John Stewart d. 1298
Robert I 1274–1329; King of Scotland	Maol Choluim (Malcolm) II d. 1333; Mormaer of Lennox	?
Marjorie Bruce; 1296–1316	Domhnall (Donald) d. 1365; Mormaer of Lennox	?	Alan Stewart of Dreghorn d. 1333
Edward III; 1312–1377; King of England	Robert II; 1316–1390; King of Scotland	Margaret; Countess of Lennox (?)	Walter of Faslane (also Baltar mac Amlaimh) de facto Mormaer of Lennox	Alexander Stewart of Darnley d. 1374
Resigned, 1385
Earl of Richmond (5th creation), 1342
John of Gaunt; 1340–1399; Duke of Lancaster; Earl of Richmond	Adam de Gordon d. 1402; Lord of Gordon	Robert III; 1337–1406; King of Scots	Robert Stewart c. 1340–1420; Duke of Albany	Donnchadh; Mormaer of Lennox r. 1385–1425	Alexander Stewart of Darnley d. 1404
Earldom of Richmond (5th creation) surrendered, 1372
Lord of (Seigneur d')Aubigny, 1422
Henry IV; 1367–1413; King of England	John Beaufort; 1373–1410; Earl of Somerset	Elizabeth Gordon d. 1439 m. Alexander Seton d. 1440 or 1441; Lord Gordon	Murdoch Stewart; 1362-1425; Duke of Albany	Isabella d. 1458; Countess of Lennox	Elizabeth	John Stewart of Darnley c. 1380–1429; 1st Comte d'Évreux, Seigneur de Concressault, 1st Lord of Aubigny
Earldom of Lennox (1st creation) extinct, 1458
Earl of Richmond (6th creation), 1414	Earl of Huntly, 1445
John of Lancaster; 1389–1435; Duke of Bedford, Earl of Richmond	John Beaufort c. 1403–1444; Duke of Somerset	Alexander Seton (Gordon) d. 1470; 1st Earl of Huntly	James I 1394–1437; King of Scots	Joan Beaufort c. 1404–1445	James Stewart c. 1399 – c. 1451; Black Knight of Lorn	Alan Stewart of Darnley after 1406 – 1439	John Stewart d. 1482; 2nd Lord of Aubigny
Earldom of Richmond (6th creation) extinct, 1435
Earl of Richmond (7th creation), 1452	Earl of Lennox (2nd creation), 1488
Edmund Tudor; 1430–1456; 1st Earl of Richmond	Margaret Beaufort; 1443–1509	George Gordon d. 1501; 2nd Earl of Huntly	Annabella of Scotland c. 1433–1509	James II; 1430–1460; King of Scots	John Stewart a. 1430–1495; 1st Earl of Lennox	John Stewart c. 1440–1512; Earl of Atholl	Bernard Stewart c. 1452 – 1508; 3rd Lord of Aubigny
Henry Tudor; 1457–1509; 2nd Earl of Richmond, Later King Henry VII	James III; 1451–1488; King of Scots	Mary Stewart; 1453–1488
Earldom of Richmond (7th creation) merged into the Crown, 1509
Elizabeth Stewart d. after 1531	Matthew Stewart; 1460–1513; 2nd Earl of Lennox	Robert Stewart c. 1470–1544; 4th Lord of Aubigny	Anne
Henry VIII; 1491–1547; King of England	Alexander Gordon d. 1524; 3rd Earl of Huntly	James IV; 1473–1513; King of Scots	Margaret Tudor; 1489–1541	Archibald Douglas; 1489–1557; Earl of Angus	John Stewart c. 1490–1526; 3rd Earl of Lennox	Elizabeth Stewart
John Gordon d. 1517; Lord Gordon	Margaret Stewart b. 1498)
Earl of Lennox (4th creation), 1578
Duke of Richmond and Somerset, 1525	Earl of March (3rd Scottish creation), 1581
Henry Fitzroy; 1519–1536; Duke of Richmond and Somerset	George Gordon; 1514–1562; 4th Earl of Huntly	James V 1512–1542; King of Scots	Margaret Douglas; 1515–1578	Matthew Stewart; 1516–1571; 4th Earl of Lennox	Robert Stewart c. 1522–1586; Earl of Lennox, Earl of March	John Stewart d. 1567; 5th Lord of Aubigny
Dukedom of Richmond and Somerset extinct, 1536	Earldom of Lennox (2nd creation) merged with crown, 1571	Earldom of Lennox (4th creation) "exchanged" for the Earldom of March, 1580
Earl of Lennox (3rd creation), c. 1571	Earl of Lennox (5th creation), 1580; Duke of Lennox (1st creation), 1581
George Gordon d. 1576; 5th Earl of Huntly	Mary; 1542–1587; Queen of Scots	Henry Stuart; 1545–1567; Lord Darnley	Charles Stuart; 1557–1576; Earl of Lennox	Esmé Stewart; 1542–1583; Duke of Lennox, etc., 6th Lord of Aubigny
Earldom of Lennox (3rd creation) extinct, 1576
Earl of Richmond, Baron Settrington (1st creation), 1613
Marquess of Huntly, Earl of Enzie, and Lord Gordon of Badenoch, 1599	Duke of Richmond (1st creation), 1623	Earl of March (3rd English creation), 1619
George Gordon; 1562–1636; 1st Marquess of Huntly, etc., 6th Earl of Huntly	James VI and I 1566–1625; King of England and Scotland	Ludovic Stewart; 1574–1623; 2nd Duke of Lennox, 1st Duke of Richmond, etc.	Esmé Stewart; 1579–1624; 3rd Duke of Lennox, 2nd Earl of Richmond, 3rd Baron Settrington, 1st Earl of March, 7th Lord of Aubigny
Dukedom of Richmond, Earldom of Richmond and Settrington Barony extinct, 1623
Viscount Aboyne, 1632	Duke of Richmond (2nd creation), 1641
George Gordon c. 1592–1649; 2nd Marquess of Huntly, etc., 7th Earl of Huntly, 1st Viscount Aboyne	Charles I 1600–1649; King of England and Scotland	James Stewart; 1612–1655; 4th Duke of Lennox, 1st Duke of Richmond, 2nd Earl of March	Henry Stewart; 1616–1632; 8th Lord of Aubigny	George Stewart; 1618–1642; 9th Lord of Aubigny	Ludovic Stewart; 1619–1665; 10th Lord of Aubigny
Duke of Aubigny (France), 1684	Earl of Aboyne and Lord Gordon of Strathaven and Glenlivet, 1660
James Gordon c. 1620–1649; 2nd Viscount Aboyne	Lewis Gordon c. 1626–1653; 3rd Marquess of Huntly, etc., 8th Earl of Huntly	Charles II; 1630–1685; King of England and Scotland	Louise de Kérousaille; 1649–1734; Duchess of Portsmouth, Duchess of Aubigny	Charles Gordon c. 1638–1681; 1st Earl of Aboyne, etc.	Esmé Stewart; 1649–1660; 5th Duke of Lennox, 2nd Duke of Richmond, 3rd Earl of March	Charles Stewart; 1639–1672; 6th Duke of Lennox, 3rd Duke of Richmond, 4th Earl of March, 11th Lord of Aubigny
Aboyne Viscountcy extinct, 1649	Dukedoms of Lennox and Richmond, earl of March (3rd English creation), and lordship of Aubigny extinct, 1672
Duke of Gordon (1st creation), Viscount of Inverness, and Lord Strathaven, Balmore, Auchindoun, Garthie and Kincardine, 1684	Duke of Richmond (3rd creation), Duke of Lennox (2nd creation), Earl of March (4th English creation), Earl of Darnley, Baron Settrington of Settrington in the County of York (2nd creation), and Lord Torbolton, 1675
George Gordon; 1st Duke of Gordon, etc., 4th Marquess of Huntly, etc., 9th Earl of Huntly	Charles Lennox; 1672–1723; 1st Duke of Richmond and Duke of Lennox, etc., Duke of Aubigny	Charles Gordon c. 1670–1702; 2nd Earl of Aboyne, etc.
Alexander Gordon; 1720–1752; 2nd Duke of Gordon, etc., 5th Marquess of Huntly, etc., 10th Earl of Huntly	Charles Lennox; 1701–1750; 2nd Duke of Richmond and Duke of Lennox, etc., Duke of Aubigny	John Gordon d. 1732; 3rd Earl of Aboyne, etc.
Cosmo George Gordon; 1720–1752; 3rd Duke of Gordon, etc., 6th Marquess of Huntly, etc., 11th Earl of Huntly	Charles Lennox; 1735–1806; 3rd Duke of Richmond and Duke of Lennox, etc., Duke of Aubigny	George Lennox; 1737–1805	Charles Gordon c. 1726–1794; 4th Earl of Aboyne, etc.
Baron Gordon of Huntly, 1784
Alexander Gordon; 1743–1827; 4th Duke of Gordon, etc., 7th Marquess of Huntly, etc., 12th Earl of Huntly, 1st Earl of Norwich, 1st Baron Gordon of Huntly
Baron Meldrum of Morven in the County of Aberdeen, 1815; Marquess of Huntly reverted, 1838
George Duncan Gordon; 1770–1836; 5th Duke of Gordon, etc., 8th Marquess of Huntly, etc., 13th Earl of Huntly, 5th Earl of Enzie, 2nd Earl of Norwich, 2nd Baron Gordon of Huntly	Lady Charlotte Gordon; 1768–1842	Charles Lennox; 1764–1819; 4th Duke of Richmond and Duke of Lennox, etc., Duke of Aubigny, etc.	George Gordon; 1761–1853; 9th Marquess of Huntly, 14th Earl of Huntly, 5th Earl of Aboyne, etc., 1st Baron Meldrum
Dukedom of Gordon (1st creation), earldom of Norwich (4th creation), earldom of Enzie, viscountcy of Inverness, lordship Strathaven, Balmore, Auchindoun, Garthie and Kincardine, barony Gordon of Huntly extinct, 1836; Marquessate and earldom of Huntly continued with George Gordon, 5th Earl of Aboyne
Charles Gordon-Lennox; 1791–1860; 5th Duke of Richmond and Duke of Lennox, etc., Duke of Aubigny, etc.	Charles Gordon; 1792–1863; 10th Marquess of Huntly, 15th Earl of Huntly, 6th Earl of Aboyne, etc., 2nd Baron Meldrum
Duke of Gordon (2nd creation) and Earl of Kinrara, 1876
Charles Henry Gordon-Lennox; 1818–1903; 6th Duke of Richmond and Duke of Lennox, 1st Duke of Gordon, etc., 6th Duke of Aubigny, etc.
Charles Henry Gordon-Lennox; 1845–1928; 7th Duke of Richmond and Duke of Lennox, 2nd Duke of Gordon, etc., 7th Duke of Aubigny, etc.	Charles Gordon; 1847–1937; 11th Marquess of Huntly, 16th Earl of Huntly, 7th Earl of Aboyne, etc., 3rd Baron Meldrum	Granville Armyne Gordon; 1856–1907
Charles Henry Gordon-Lennox; 1870–1935; 8th Duke of Richmond and Duke of Lennox, 8th Duke of Aubigny, etc. 3rd Duke of Gordon, etc.	Granville Cecil Douglas Gordon; 1883–1930
Charles Henry Gordon-Lennox; 1899–1919; Lord Settrington	Frederick Charles Gordon-Lennox; 1904–1989; 9th Duke of Richmond and Duke of Lennox, 9th Duke of Aubigny, etc., 4th Duke of Gordon, etc.	Douglas Charles Lindsey Gordon; 1908–1987; 12th Marquess of Huntly, 18th Earl of Huntly, 8th Earl of Aboyne, etc., 4th Baron Meldrum
Charles Henry Gordon-Lennox; 1929–2017; 10th Duke of Richmond and Duke of Lennox, 10th Duke of Aubigny, etc., 5th Duke of Gordon, etc.
Charles Gordon-Lennox b. 1955; 11th Duke of Richmond and Duke of Lennox, 11th Duke of Aubigny, etc., 6th Duke of Gordon, etc.	Granville Charles Gomer Gordon b. 1944; 13th Marquess of Huntly, 18th Earl of Huntly, 9th Earl of Aboyne, etc., 5th Baron Meldrum
Charles Henry Gordon-Lennox b. 1994 styled Earl of March and Kinrara	Alastair Gordon b. 1973 styled Earl of Aboyne
Heir apparent to the dukedoms of Richmond, Lennox, Aubigny, and Gordon	Heir apparent to the marquessate of Huntly

== See also ==
- List of French peerages
- Duke of Richmond
- Duke of Lennox
- Duke of Gordon
