= Lord Darnley =

Scottish noble title

Lord Darnley is a noble title associated with a Scottish Lordship of Parliament, first created in 1356 for the family of Stewart of Darnley and tracing a descent to the Dukedom of Richmond in England. The title's name refers to Darnley in Scotland. Outside the Peerage of Scotland, another Earldom of Darnley was created in the Peerage of Ireland in 1729.

== Early history ==
The first baron was Sir John Stewart of Darnley. His descendant, John Stewart, 1st Earl of Lennox, was created Earl of Lennox in 1488. Matthew Stewart, 4th Earl of Lennox (1516–1571), was the father of Henry Stuart, Lord Darnley (1545–1567) (later created Duke of Albany), better known as "Lord Darnley", a courtesy title, his father holding that title, who became the husband of Mary, Queen of Scots, and thus father of King James VI and I (1566–1625).

For a time in 1562 and 1563, the title Lord Darnley was held by Queen Mary's half-brother John Stewart, Commendator of Coldingham. On 4 June 1563, Mary gave some of the executed John Gordon of Findlater's properties near Banff to "John Stewart, Lord Darnley".

Together with Lord Ruthven and others, Henry, Lord Darnley openly murdered David Rizzio in Holyrood Palace in March 1566. Mary thereafter distanced herself from Darnley.

On 10 February 1567, Darnley died when his residence was destroyed by a bomb whilst his wife, Mary, Queen of Scots, attended a party for the wedding of her servant Bastian Pagez. Darnley and his groom were found dead at the scene with marks on their necks (possibly they were strangled) and next to them lay a knife with which they had been stabbed. The suspected murderer, James Hepburn, 4th Earl of Bothwell, married Mary one month after he was acquitted and released from jail.

== Later history ==
With the elevation of the Earldom of Lennox to a dukedom in 1581 the barony of Darnley retained its link with Lennox and in 1612 the Dukedom of Richmond was added to the title and remained so after its extinction and revival in 1675. The subsidiary Earldom of Darnley was revived at the same time.
