= Matthew Stewart, Earl of Lennox =

Matthew Stewart, Earl of Lennox may refer to:

- Matthew Stewart, 2nd Earl of Lennox (1488–1513), Scottish nobleman
- Matthew Stewart, 4th Earl of Lennox (1516–1571), father of Henry Stewart, King of the Scots
