= Stewart of Darnley =

Scots noble family

Stewart of Darnley, also known as the Lennox Stewarts, was a notable Scots family. They were a branch of the Clan Stewart, who provided the English Stuart monarchs with their male-line Stuart descent, after the reunion of their branch with the royal Scottish branch.

In 1565 the Darnley branch was re-united with the Royal House of Stewart when Henry Stuart, Lord Darnley married his half-first cousin, Mary, Queen of Scots. Despite what their common surname suggests, they were not related closely by virtue of both being Stewarts — being only ninth cousins once removed in the male line. It was rather through their shared grandmother, Margaret Tudor (daughter of King Henry VII of England) that they were related, and which gave both their claims to the English throne. The son of their union James VI of Scots succeeded to the throne of England and the throne of Ireland as James I.

Lord Darnley's claim to the Scottish throne was also not by virtue of his being a Stewart, rather he derived it through his great-grandmother, Elizabeth Hamilton, a granddaughter of James II.

The later English kings and queens of the House of Stuart, from James I and Charles I onwards, were more properly members of the Stewart of Darnley branch, and all drew upon their feudal heritage in Lennox.

== Origins and name ==
Arms of Sir John Stewart (d. 1298)

The Stewarts of Darnley were descended from Sir John Stewart (d. 1298), the second son of Alexander Stewart, 4th High Steward of Scotland. Their name is derived from Derneley, a barony in Eastwood parish, Renfrewshire. It was located 1.5 mi (2.4 km) east of Barrhead, present day Darnley, within the city of Glasgow.

In 1356, Robert Stewart, High Steward of Scotland, granted the barony to Sir John Stewart, the eldest son of Sir Alan Stewart of Dreghorn. Like the Royal Stewarts, the Stewarts of Darnley used both the 'Stuart' and the 'Stewart' spelling of their surname.

=== Ancestors ===
- Alexander Stewart, 4th High Steward of Scotland
- Sir John Stewart (d.1298)
- Alan Stewart of Dreghorn (d.1333)
- Alexander Stewart of Darnley (d.1374)
- Alexander Stewart of Darnley (d.1404)
- John Stewart of Darnley (d.1429)
- Alan Stewart of Darnley (d.1439)

== Lordship of Aubigny ==
Arms of Sir John Stewart of Darnley

Sir John Stewart of Darnley (d. 1429) fought in the Hundred Years' War under his namesake and distant cousin John Stewart, 2nd Earl of Buchan, in the army of Charles VII of France. For his services, he was rewarded with the lands of Aubigny-sur-Nère and Concressault, which were given to the second son in the family so they could live in France to strengthen the Auld Alliance.

Notable members of this branch were:

- Bernard Stewart, 4th Lord of Aubigny, commander of the Garde Écossaise; commander in the armies of Charles VIII of France and Louis XII during the Italian Wars.
- Robert Stewart, 5th Lord of Aubigny, Marshal of France; fought in the Battle of Marignano and the Battle of Pavia.
- George Stewart, 9th Seigneur d'Aubigny, fought with the French against the Spanish at the Battle of Montjuïc (1641); killed during the English Civil War at the Battle of Edge Hill.

== Earldom of Lennox ==
Arms of John Stewart, 1st Earl of Lennox

The eldest son of Sir Alan Stewart of Darnley (d. 1439) was John Stewart, Lord Darnley, head of the House of Stewart of Darnley, who was created Earl of Lennox in 1488. He died in 1495 and was succeeded by the following descendants:

- Matthew Stewart, 2nd Earl of Lennox (1488- ob Flodden, 1513)
- John Stewart, 3rd Earl of Lennox (ob 1526)
- Matthew Stewart, 4th Earl of Lennox (1516–1571)

In 1580, the head of the House of Stewart, King James VI of Scots, granted the title of Duke of Lennox to Esmé Stewart, 1st Duke of Lennox, a cousin and a member of a French branch of the Royal Stewarts.

The following English members of the House of Stewart of Darnley were styled Earls of Lennox by the English Crown, although the King of Scots, in whose kingdom the earldom of Lennox lay, did not recognize the title:

- Charles Stuart, 1st Earl of Lennox (1555–1576), second son of the 4th Earl of the second creation
- Lady Arbella Stuart (1575–1615) (over-ridden)

== Claimants to the English throne ==
In 1544 Matthew Stewart, 4th Earl of Lennox married Margaret Douglas, the granddaughter of Henry VII. Their sons Henry Stuart, Lord Darnley and Charles Stuart, 1st Earl of Lennox, were held by contemporaries to have a credible claim to the throne of England.

Margaret Douglas was the fruit of the 1514 union of Margaret Tudor, Dowager Queen of Scots and elder daughter of Henry VII with Archibald Douglas, 6th Earl of Angus. Born in England and raised at the court of her uncle Henry VIII, Margaret was Henry's officially recognised heir between the disgrace of Anne Boleyn and the birth of the future Edward VI.

In 1565 Henry Stuart, Lord Darnley married his cousin Mary Queen of Scots, like him a descendant of Margaret Tudor and Henry VII. Mary's descent from Margaret Tudor's first marriage to James IV of Scots also placed her in line for the English throne, but many argued that Margaret Douglas's claim was superior as Margaret and her sons Henry Stuart, Lord Darnley and Charles Stuart, 1st Earl of Lennox had been born in England. According to English custom it is desirable that the monarch be naturalised or born in England.

By marrying Darnley, Mary neutralised a dangerous rival claim to the throne of England whilst strengthening that of her own house. In 1603 Mary and Darnley's son, James VI of Scotland, succeeded Elizabeth I as King of England, thereby uniting the crowns of England and Scotland and laying the basis for the future United Kingdom.

== See also ==
- Duke of Aubigny
- Duke of Richmond
- Duke of Lennox
- Earl of Lennox
- Auld Alliance
