= Battle of Linlithgow Bridge =

Scottish battle (1526)

Coordinates: 55.971°N 3.634°W

Designations

Registered battlefield
- Designated: 30 November 2011
- Reference no.: BTL25

The Battle of Linlithgow Bridge is a battle that took place on 4 September 1526 in the village of Linlithgow Bridge, outside the Scottish town of Linlithgow. It was fought between a force of 10,000 men led by the Earl of Lennox and a force of 2,500 led by James Hamilton, 1st Earl of Arran. The battle was part of a power struggle in Scotland for control of the young Scottish king, James V. The battlefield was added to the national Inventory of Historic Battlefields in Scotland prepared by Historic Scotland under the Scottish Historical Environment Policy of 2009.

== Background ==
The Battle of Linlithgow Bridge was a product of the power vacuum created by the death of James IV in the Battle of Flodden in 1513. His young son, James V, was only a year old when his father was killed, and so Scotland was ruled by regents during his childhood. The first was his mother, Margaret Tudor (sister of King Henry VIII of England), until she remarried in the following year, and was replaced by John Stewart, 2nd Duke of Albany, who was himself next in line for the throne after James and his younger brother, Alexander Stewart, Duke of Ross. In 1525, Archibald Douglas, 6th Earl of Angus, the young king's stepfather, took custody of James and held him as a virtual prisoner for three years, exercising power on his behalf. James’ mother made a number of attempts to free her son from the clutches of Douglas, and one of these resulted in the Battle of Linlithgow Bridge.

== The battle ==
In 1526, Margaret persuaded the Earl of Lennox and Archbishop James Beaton to support her cause. Lennox raised an army over 10,000 and marched on Edinburgh from his base in Stirling. By this time Archibald Douglas had won the support of James Hamilton, 1st Earl of Arran and the latter was sent to try to delay the march by mustering the people of Linlithgow and the surrounding area. Arran arranged his force of 2,500 men on the strategically important Pace Hill overlooking Linlithgow and the River Avon. Lennox, seeing the strength of this defensive position had to rethink his plans.

Lennox intended to outflank and defeat Arran before Douglas could arrive from Edinburgh with reinforcements. Downstream from the town, the river was impassable but his scouts found a ford 1 mile (1.6 kilometres) upstream, at Manuel Convent. Lennox forced a crossing there and advanced on Arran's flank. However, Arran saw the threat and placed his troops facing south along the ridge of Pace Hill. Lennox's attack was across the Avon, over boggy ground and finally uphill, but he very nearly succeeded in dislodging Arran's outnumbered men. However time ran out for Lennox as Douglas reinforcements arrived followed by the reluctant King James.

Many of the Lennox men were killed either on the ridge or along the banks of the river Avon. The Earl of Glencairn was captured and Lennox himself was wounded. It was said that Lennox surrendered to his opponents but was then murdered by James Hamilton of Finnart. The location of Lennox's murder is commemorated with a cairn that stands at the entrance to the Kettilstoun estate.

== The aftermath ==
After the battle, James remained under the control of Archibald Douglas until, in 1528, aged sixteen, he escaped from Edinburgh to join his mother in Stirling and assume the reins of government himself. Douglas and his family had their lands confiscated and he was forced to seek refuge in England. James continued to reign until his death in 1542.
