= John Stewart, 1st Earl of Lennox =

Earl of Lennox

John Stewart
- 1st Earl of Lennox
- Arms of John Stewart, as Earl of Lennox
- Born: c. 1408
- Died: 31 August 1495 (86–87 years)
- Noble family: Stewart of Darnley
- Spouse: Margaret Montgomerie
- Issue: Matthew Stewart, 2nd Earl of Lennox; Robert Stewart, 5th Seigneur d'Aubigny; John Stewart, Seigneur d'Oison; William Stewart, Seigneur d'Oison; Alexander Stewart; Lady Marion Stewart; Lady Elizabeth Stuart; Lady Elizabeth Stewart
- Father: Alan Stewart of Darnley
- Mother: Catherine Seton

John Stewart, 1st Earl of Lennox (before 1430 – 8 July/11 September 1495) was a Scottish earl. He was known as Lord Darnley and later as the Earl of Lennox.

== Family ==
Stewart was the son of Catherine Seton and Alan Stewart of Darnley, a direct descendant of Alexander Stewart, 4th High Steward of Scotland. His paternal grandmother was the daughter and co-heiress of Donnchadh, Earl of Lennox. Through his mother he was also a descendant of Thomas Randolph, 1st Earl of Moray, nephew of King Robert I of Scotland. Through his son Matthew Stewart, 2nd Earl of Lennox, Stewart was the great-great-great-grandfather of Henry Stuart, Lord Darnley, husband of his first cousin Mary, Queen of Scots and father of James VI, King of Scotland, who became James I, King of England. Stewart's descendants have held the English throne ever since James I, as well as the royal houses of several European monarchies.

== Political career ==
As head of the powerful family of Stewart of Darnley he was created Governor of Rothesay Castle in 1465 and appointed Warden of the West Marches of Scotland. When the male line of the Earldom of Lennox became extinct he was heir to half of the lands and made a deal with the co-heir in which he was made Earl of Lennox in 1473. The succession was disputed by John of Haldane, who claimed succession through descent from Duncan, 8th earl. Darnley, however, prevailed and his right to the earldom was not disputed for the last seven years of his life.

He was a loyal ally of James III during his war against the rebel lords led by Archibald Douglas, 5th Earl of Angus. After the death of the King at the Battle of Sauchieburn and the coronation of his underage son James IV he raised an army to fight against the rebel lords who now controlled the government. The rebels had seized control of Edinburgh Castle and now had possession of the important royal artillery. Included in the arsenal of Edinburgh Castle was the cannon Mons Meg which had been a wedding gift from Philip the Good, Duke of Burgundy to the King of Scots a generation earlier. Using this weapon they laid siege to Crookston Castle, seat of the Stewarts of Darnley, forcing the Earl of Lennox to surrender.

After his surrender he was allowed to keep his lands and they passed to his eldest son Matthew Stewart, 2nd Earl of Lennox who was one of the leaders of the Scottish army killed at the Battle of Flodden.

== Marriage ==
John Stewart married Margaret Montgomerie, the daughter of Alexander Montgomerie, 1st Lord Montgomerie and Margaret Boyd, by indenture on 15 May 1438, as both parties were under age. Margaret's maternal grandfather was Thomas Boyd of Kilmarnock, 5th of Kilmarnock, a descendant of Thomas Boyd of Kilmarnock, and the killer of Stewart's father. The following year, the blood feud was resolved at the Battle of Craignaught Hill, Renfrewshire, Scotland on 9 July 1439 when her grandfather Thomas Boyd was killed in revenge by Sir Alan Stewart's youngest brother Alexander Stewart, rather than being ransomed.

John had by Margaret Montgomerie eight recorded children:

=== Sons ===
- Matthew Stewart, 2nd Earl of Lennox (1460 – 9 September 1513), eldest son and heir, killed at the Battle of Flodden;
- Sir Robert Stewart, 5th Seigneur d'Aubigny (1470–1544)
- Sir John Stewart, Seigneur d'Oison (before 1474 – c. 1512)
- Sir William Stewart, Seigneur d'Oison (before 1495 – before 1504)
- Alexander Stewart (before 1495 – before 1509)

=== Daughters ===
- Lady Marion Stewart
- Lady Elizabeth Stuart (born 1464), married Archibald Campbell, 2nd Earl of Argyll.
- Lady Elizabeth Stewart (born before 1476), married Sir John Colquhoun of Luss, Dunbartonshire.

== Ancestors ==
Ancestors of John Stewart, 1st Earl of Lennox

Sir Alexander Stewart of Darnley
Alexander Stewart of Darnley
John Stewart of Darnley
Sir William Keith of Galston
Jonetta Keith
Alan Stewart of Darnley
Walter de Fasselane
Donnchadh, Earl of Lennox
Margaret of Lennox
Elizabeth of Lennox
Sir Archibald Campbell of Lochawe
Helen Campbell
Isabella Lamont
John Stewart, 1st Earl of Lennox
William Seton, 1st Lord Seton
John Seton, 2nd Lord Seton
Janet Fleming
Sir William Seton, Master of Seton
Sir William St Clair, 8th Baron of Roslin
Katherine Sinclair
Isabella de Strathern
Catherine Seton
John de Dunbar, of Derchester & Birkynside
George Dunbar, 10th Earl of March
Isabella Randolph
Janet Dunbar
Alan de Wyntoun
Christine Seton
Margaret Seton, heiress of Seton

Peerage of Scotland
New creation	Earl of Lennox; 1488–1495	Succeeded by Matthew Stewart
