= Robert Stewart, Earl of March =

16th-century Scottish noble

Robert Stewart
- Earl of March
- Born: c. 1522
- Died: 29 March 1586; St Andrews, Fife, Scotland
- Noble family: Stewart of Darnley
- Spouse: Elizabeth Stewart (m. 1574; ann. 1581)
- Father: John Stewart, 3rd Earl of Lennox
- Mother: Elizabeth Stewart

Robert Stewart, Earl of Lennox (1572 creation) and Earl of March (c. 1522 – 29 March 1586) was a Scottish nobleman of the family of Stewart of Darnley.

== Titles ==
Arms of Robert Stewart

He was the second son of John Stewart, 3rd Earl of Lennox by his wife Elizabeth, daughter of John Stewart, 1st Earl of Atholl, and younger brother of Matthew Stewart, 4th Earl of Lennox. He also bore the ecclesiastical titles of Bishop of Caithness, his grant confirmed by Pope Paul III in January 1542, an office previously held by his maternal uncle Andrew Stewart, and Commendator of St Andrews Cathedral Priory.

When Matthew, 4th Earl of Lennox, died in 1571, his heir was his grandson King James VI, as his eldest son Lord Darnley had died in 1567, so the title merged in the Crown. It was recreated for Matthew's second son Charles, (Darnley's younger brother), 1st Earl of Lennox (1572 creation), but he died without male issue in 1576. Robert Stewart was next in line, and was created Earl of Lennox and Lord Darnley on 16 June 1578.

In 1580 Robert resigned his Earldom of Lennox and Lordship of Darnley; they were recreated the following year for his nephew Esmé Stewart, son of John Stewart, seigneur d'Aubigny, third son of the third Earl of Lennox. On 5 March 1580 he was created Earl of March and Lord of Dunbar and held these titles until his death. As he had no legitimate issue, the titles again reverted to the crown.

== Life ==
Robert Stewart was brought up in the Scottish royal household. He was given a suit of black clothes with a doublet in December 1538 and April 1541.

In 1543, Matthew Stewart Robert Stewart came to oppose the rule of Regent Arran and Mary of Guise in Scotland. After the battle of Glasgow, in April 1543 Robert crossed the Clyde from Dumbarton Castle and rode to England, where he was regarded as a 'pledge' or hostage for Lennox. As the war of the Rough Wooing continued, Robert Stewart briefly occupied Dumbarton Castle against the Scottish Government of Regent Arran. Robert came from England in May 1546 with the support of Henry VIII; he sailed from Chester with around 20 followers in the Katherine Goodman accompanied by a pinnace. Having borrowed the artillery of the Earl of Argyle, Arran successfully besieged the castle, which surrendered after 20 days. The siege at Dumbarton delayed Arran's action at the siege of St Andrews Castle on the east coast of Scotland.

Rehabilitated in Scotland, Robert continued to pursue legal action with Alexander Gordon over their competition for church appointments. At the end of the war, in 1550, Robert sought permission from Arran and Guise to return to university in France, he was 28.

John Elder, a Scottish writer who had settled in England, wrote a description of the wedding of Mary I of England and Philip II of Spain for Robert Stewart as a New Year's gift for 1555. Elder's letter was published, addressed to his good friend Lord Robert 'Stuarde' Bishop of Caithness and Provost of Dumbarton College.

On 6 January 1579 Lord Lennox married Elizabeth Stewart, daughter of John Stewart, 4th Earl of Atholl and widow of Hugh Fraser, 5th Lord Lovat. They were divorced 19 May 1581 and she married James Stewart, Earl of Arran shortly afterwards.
