= Battle of Craignaught Hill =

1439 Scottish clan battle

- Part of Clan Boyd and Stewart of Darnley feud
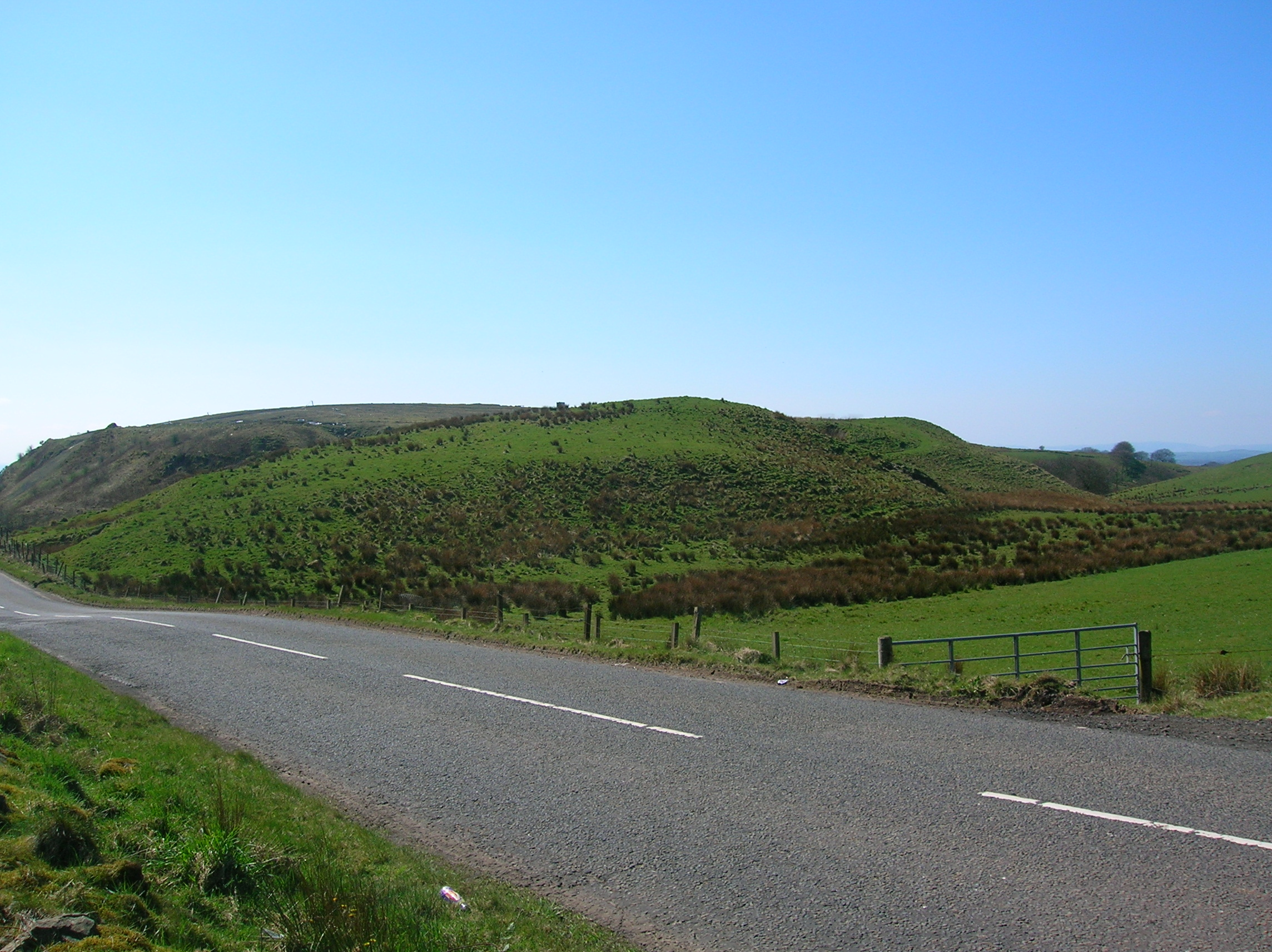
- Boyd's Hill and Craignaught Hill in Ayrshire where the battle took place
Date	9 July 1439
Location	Craignaught Hill (also known as Boyd’s Hill), Dunlop, East Ayrshire, Scotland
Result	Victory for the Stewarts of Darnley

Belligerents
Stewarts of Darnley	Clan Boyd

Commanders and leaders
Alexander Stewart	Sir Thomas Boyd †

Strength
210 men (or three detachments each of 70 men)	100 men

Casualties and losses
“Many valiant men on every side”	“Many valiant men on every side”

The Battle of Craignaught Hill also known as the Battle of Boyd's Hill or the Battle of Boyd's Slack, was a Scottish clan battle fought on 9 July 1439. It was fought between the Clan Boyd of Kilmarnock against the Stewart family of Darnley.

== Background ==
In 1439 Alan Stewart of Darnley and Thomas Boyd, chief of the Clan Boyd were at feud. At Polmaise Thorn, Thomas Boyd had attacked Alan Stewart and killed him. Another account says that Polmaise Thorne was three miles from Falkirk and that the feud between Boyd and Stewart had at that time been in its third year. Boyd then retraced his steps back to Ayrshire and prepared his house in Kilmarnock in anticipation of reprisal.

Alexander Stewart, youngest brother of Alan, assembled his men at Darnley House and did not seek the aid of the civil authorities. He divided his followers into three detachments, each consisting of about seventy men. He instructed two of these detachments to enter the lands surrounding Boyd's Dean Castle at different points and then to meet him the following night at Craignaught Hill. Stewart and his detachment then went in a third route with the object of making the retaliation as wide spread as possible.

Sir Robert Boyd with one hundred of his men were waiting in Dean Castle, ready at a moment's notice to ride out and give the Stewarts a stern welcome to Kilmarnock. Boyd sent out a scout who returned only to report the one Stewart detachment that he had seen of about seventy men and that was led by Stewart of Darnley himself. The Boyd's thus expecting their enemy to be inferior in number were eager for the conflict. Boyd said goodbye to his wife and he and his men left the castle for battle.

In the meantime Stewart of Darnley and his men had settled down for the night at Craignaught Hill with their captured cattle and sheep. As Boyd's men approached the Stewart's camp, Darnley sent out a scout who reported back that the Boyds were one hundred strong. Darnley apparently “rubbed his hands gleefully together” and instructed his other two detachments to retire on either flank at a distance of about four hundred yards.

== Battle ==
When the Boyds came within striking distance Stewart of Darnley gave the order for all of his forces to convey. Boyd found that he had walked into a trap and numbers of men larger than what had been reported to him by his scouts. Surrounded, Boyd gave the order for his men to charge. The other two Stewart detachments on the flanks had joined the battle and the Boyds found themselves outnumbered by more than two to one. The Boyds fiercely fell upon the Stewarts whose numbers did begin to thin. The Boyds set themselves back to back to beat back the Stewarts or die where they fought. Darnley tried in vain to find a gap to throw the Boyds into confusion, but the Boyd's circle of defence held firm. Thomas Boyd himself sprang out from the circle in an attempt to get to Stewart of Darnley, but Darnley did not want to risk the combat. Seeing an opportunity one of Stewarts drove his dagger into the back of Thomas Boyd and with their leader dead the Boyds fled. The Stewarts victorious, they rested until the next morning when they marched back towards Renfrewshire, satisfied that they had taken their revenge. When the Stewarts had gone the Boyds returned to recover the body of their fallen chief and return with it to Kilmarnock.

== Aftermath ==
The Battle of Craignaught Hill does not seem to have ended the feud between the Boyds and Stewarts of Darnley as another of the Stewarts was later killed by the Boyds near to the town of Dunbarton.
