= Robert Stewart, 4th Lord of Aubigny =

French soldier

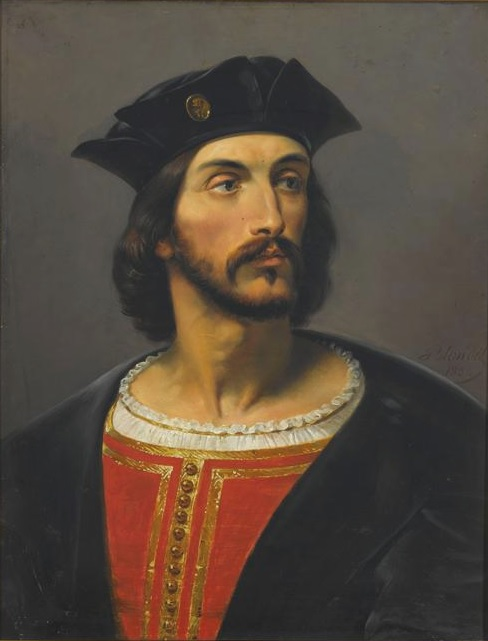
Robert Stewart, 4th Lord of Aubigny

Robert Stewart (or Stuart) (c. 1470–1544), 4th Lord of Aubigny, Count of Beaumont-le-Roger, was a French soldier belonging to the family of Stewart of Darnley.

Robert was the fourth son of John Stewart, 1st Earl of Lennox and Margaret Montgomerie. He inherited the Lordship of Aubigny through his marriage to his cousin Anne Stewart, daughter of Bernard Stewart, Lord of Aubigny (died 1508). Robert began his military career in 1493 when he joined the Garde Écossaise of King Charles VIII of France. He served with Bernard in Italy in Charles VIII's Italian War and later in that of Louis XII under Trémoille.

He was made Marshal of France in 1514, reconfirmed by Francis I the following year. During the skirmishing leading to the Battle of Marignano in 1515 his soldiers under Jacques de la Palice surprised and captured the Papal commander Prospero Colonna in a daring cavalry raid behind enemy lines. He also fought at the Battle of Pavia in 1525. He died in March or April 1544.

== Robert at home ==
Arms of Robert Stewart

Robert's estate was inherited by his great nephew John Stewart, 5th Lord of Aubigny (a son of John Stewart, 3rd Earl of Lennox) and an inventory was made of Robert's goods in the Châteaux of Aubigny, La Verrerie and du Crotet in 1544, including Robert's tapestries, books, silver and weapons. Robert had two silk and leather purses made in the Scottish fashion, a Spanish guitar, and Turkish carpets. The inventory also includes a scarlet and a shot satin farthingale. Tapestry subjects at Aubigny included seven "park" and seven hunting scenes, the Nine Worthies, Nebuchadnezzar in nine scenes, seven Sibyls, single pieces of verdure and Hercules, and a set of seven new tapestries of birds and wild beasts. There were three old sets tapestries. Famous people were embroidered on six hangings of green damask, two of these had a single figure, another pair showed a couple, while two showed four characters. These hangings were augmented with more green damask to complete a room. There were several other hangings worked with a needle. The inventory is significant because it details in which rooms these tapestries and other furnishings were used.
