= John Stewart, 2nd Lord of Aubigny =

Scottish nobleman

John Stewart, 2nd Lord of Aubigny and 2nd Lord of Concressault (died 1482) was a Scottish and French nobleman.

== Life ==
Stewart was the younger son of John Stewart of Darnley and Elizabeth of Lennox. Following his father's death at the Battle of the Herrings in 1429, Stewart's older brother, Sir Alan Stewart of Darnley inherited the family estates and titles in Scotland and resigned his French titles to him with approval of Charles VII of France. Stewart became Lord of Aubigny and Concressault, serving as Captain of the 100 men of arms of the Garde Écossaise under Charles VII and his son Louis XI. In 1469, Stewart became a founder knight of the Order of Saint Michael. He died in 1482.

== Marriage and issue ==
Stewart married c.1446 Béatrix d'Apchier, daughter to Bérault, Seigneur d'Apchier. They had a son:

- Bernard Stewart, 3rd Lord of Aubigny

== Sources ==
- Balfour Paul, Sir James, Scots Peerage, IX vols. Edinburgh 1904.
