= John Stewart, 3rd Earl of Lennox =

Scottish nobleman (c. 1490–1526)

John Stewart
- 3rd Earl of Lennox
- Born: c. 1490
- Died: 4 September 1526; Linlithgow, Scotland
- Noble family: Stewart of Darnley
- Spouse: Lady Elizabeth Stewart
- Issue: Matthew Stewart, 4th Earl of Lennox; Robert Stewart, Earl of March; John Stewart, 5th Lord of Aubigny; Helen Stewart, Countess of Erroll; Elizabeth Stewart-Ross
- Father: Matthew Stewart, 2nd Earl of Lennox
- Mother: Lady Elizabeth Hamilton

John Stewart, 3rd Earl of Lennox (c. 1490 – 4 September 1526) was a prominent Scottish nobleman. He was the son of Matthew Stewart, 2nd Earl of Lennox, and Lady Elizabeth Hamilton, daughter of James Hamilton, 1st Lord Hamilton, and Mary Stewart, Princess of Scotland, daughter of King James II of Scotland.

The Earl of Lennox led an army to Linlithgow with the intention of liberating the young King James V from the pro-English Douglases. He was defeated by a smaller force led by James Hamilton, 1st Earl of Arran, at the Battle of Linlithgow Bridge. He survived the battle and was taken captive, only to be murdered subsequently by James Hamilton of Finnart.

He was succeeded by his eldest son, Matthew Stewart, 4th Earl of Lennox. The latter was the father of Henry Stewart, Lord Darnley, and the grandfather of King James VI of Scotland.

== Marriage and children ==
On 19 January 1511, he married Lady Elizabeth Stewart, daughter of John Stewart, 1st Earl of Atholl, and Lady Eleanor Sinclair, daughter of William Sinclair, 3rd Earl of Orkney.

Their children included:

- Matthew Stewart, 4th Earl of Lennox.
- Robert Stewart, Earl of March.
- John Stewart, 5th Lord of Aubigny (died c. 1567), father of Esmé Stewart, 1st Duke of Lennox.
- Lady Helen (or Eleanor) Stewart, who married: firstly, to William Hay, 6th Earl of Erroll; secondly, to John Gordon, 11th Earl of Sutherland. She died in the 1560s.
- Lady Janet Stewart, who married Ninian Ross. She was the mistress of King James V, and the mother of Adam Stewart, Prior of Perth Charterhouse.

In March 1539, Helen Stewart and Elizabeth Stewart were with the household of Mary of Guise at Linlithgow Palace. The king's tailor Thomas Arthur made gowns and kirtles for them of black velvet, satin, and taffeta, with French hats and riding hoods.

In 2026, the Daily Mail asserted that Stewart is the common ancestor of Charles III and Donald Trump, making them 15th cousins.

== Ancestors ==
Ancestors of John Stewart, 3rd Earl of Lennox

Sir Alan Stewart, 2nd Seigneur d'Aubigny
John Stewart, 1st Earl of Lennox
Catherine Seton
Matthew Stewart, 2nd Earl of Lennox
Alexander Montgomerie, 1st Lord Montgomerie
Margaret Montgomerie
Margaret Boyd
John Stewart, 3rd Earl of Lennox
Sir James Hamilton, 5th Laird of Cadzow
James Hamilton, 1st Lord Hamilton
Janet Livingston
Elizabeth Hamilton
James II of Scotland
Mary of Scotland
Mary of Guelders

== Sources ==
G. E. Cokayne et al., eds. The Complete Peerage of England, Scotland, Ireland, Great Britain, and the United Kingdom, Extant, Extinct, or Dormant. Reprint ed. (Gloucester, UK: Alan Sutton Publishing, 2000).

Peerage of Scotland
Preceded by Matthew Stewart	Earl of Lennox; 1513–1526	Succeeded by Matthew Stewart
