= Matthew Stewart, 2nd Earl of Lennox =

Scottish nobleman (c. 1460–1513)

Matthew Stewart
- 2nd Earl of Lennox
- Born: c. 1460
- Died: 9 September 1513
- Cause of death: Died at the Battle of Flodden
- Noble family: Stewart of Darnley
- Spouses: Margaret Lyle; Elizabeth Hamilton
- Issue: 6, including John Stewart, 3rd Earl of Lennox
- Father: John Stewart, 1st Earl of Lennox
- Mother: Margaret Montgomerie

Matthew Stewart, 2nd Earl of Lennox (c. 1460 – 9 September 1513) was a Scottish nobleman. He was the eldest son of John Stewart, 1st Earl of Lennox, and his wife Margaret Montgomerie, daughter of Alexander Montgomerie, 1st Lord Montgomerie. He was Lord Provost of Glasgow in 1497, and from 1509 to 1513. He died fighting at the Battle of Flodden in 1513.

== Marriages and issue ==
He married firstly, on 13 June 1490, Margaret Lyle, daughter of Robert Lyle, 2nd Lord Lyle, Chief Justiciar of Scotland.

He married secondly, on 9 April 1494, Elizabeth Hamilton, daughter of James Hamilton, 1st Lord Hamilton, and Mary Stewart, Princess of Scotland, daughter of King James II of Scotland., and he had six children – Mungo Stewart, Agnes Stewart, John Stewart, 3rd Earl of Lennox, Margaret Stewart, Elizabeth Stewart, and Catherine Stewart.

== Ancestors ==
Ancestors of Matthew Stewart, 2nd Earl of Lennox

Sir John Stewart, 1st Seigneur d'Aubigny
Sir Alan Stewart, 2nd Seigneur d'Aubigny
Elizabeth of Lennox
John Stewart, 1st Earl of Lennox
Sir William Seton of Seton
Catherine Seton
Janet Dunbar
Matthew Stewart, 2nd Earl of Lennox
John Montgomerie of Ardrossan
Alexander Montgomerie, 1st Lord Montgomerie
Agnes MacDonald
Margaret Montgomerie
Thomas Boyd, 5th of Kilmarnock
Margaret Boyd
Isabel Boyd

== Sources ==
- G. E. Cokayne et al., eds. The Complete Peerage of England, Scotland, Ireland, Great Britain, and the United Kingdom, Extant, Extinct, or Dormant. Reprint ed. (Gloucester, UK: Alan Sutton Publishing, 2000).

Peerage of Scotland
Preceded by John Stewart	Earl of Lennox; 1495–1513	Succeeded by John Stewart
