= Alexander Stewart of Darnley (died 1404) =

Sir Alexander Stewart of Darnley (died 1404) was a Scottish nobleman, and a patrilineal ancestor of James VI and I, King of England, Ireland, and Scotland.

== Life ==
He was the son of Sir Alexander Stewart of Darnley (d. after 26 August 1374) and Joanna. He married first Janet Turnbull of Minto and had at least one son with her. He married second Jonetta Keith, widow of David Hamilton of Cadzow, and daughter of Sir William Keith of Galston, and was granted his wife's lands of Galston by John Stewart, Earl of Carrick and they had six children:

With Janet:

- William Stewart of Jedsworth, killed at the Battle of Homildon Hill. Ancestor of the Earls of Galloway

With Jonetta

- John Stewart of Darnley, Lord of Aubigny and Concressault, Count of Évreux (k. 12 February 1429) killed at the Battle of the Herrings
- Alexander Stewart of Torbane and Galston
- Robert Stewart of Newtoun and Westoun
- James Stewart
- William Stewart of Castlemilk, (k.12 February 1429) killed at the Battle of the Herrings
- Janet Stewart, married Thomas Somerville, 1st Lord Somerville

== Books ==
- Balfour Paul, Sir James, Scots Peerage, IX vols. Edinburgh 1904.
