= Alan Stewart of Dreghorn =

Scottish noble

Sir Alan Stewart of Dreghorn (died 19 July 1333) was a Scottish nobleman.

== Life ==
The son of Sir John Stewart (d. 1298) and his wife Margaret de Bonkyll, Sir Alan was a Scottish knight who fought for Robert the Bruce during the First War of Scottish Independence.

Sir Alan accompanied Edward Bruce to Ireland in 1315, during the latter's attempt at the throne of Ireland. He was captured by the English in 1316 but was quickly ransomed. For his services to the King, Sir Alan was granted the lands of Dreghorn in Ayrshire on 28 April 1315.

Sir Alan Stewart was killed with his brothers, Sir James and Sir John Stewart, at the Battle of Halidon Hill in 1333.

With a daughter of the Cameron of Lochiel, Sir Alan Stewart had these children:

- John Stewart of Cruikston and Darnley
- Walter Stewart
- Alexander Stewart of Darnley
- Elizabeth Stewart – married John fitz Walter, son of Walter fitz Gilbert of Cadzow
