= Alexander Stewart of Darnley (died 1374) =

Scottish nobleman

Sir Alexander Stewart of Darnley (died 1374) was a Scottish nobleman.

== Life ==
Alexander Stewart was the third son of Sir Alan Stewart of Dreghorn and Lady Marion Cameron. By 1345 he had received a charter for lands at Cambusnethan from Robert II. Following the successive deaths of his elder brothers, he inherited their baronies of Cruikston and Darnley, and is referred to as Dominus of the two properties by 1371.

Sir Alexander had a son, Sir Alexander Stewart of Darnley.

== Notes ==
Alexander is the seven times paternal grandfather of James I of England and VI of Scotland.
