= Alan Stewart of Darnley =

Scottish nobleman

Sir Alan Stewart of Darnley
- Born: after 1406
- Died: 1439
- Noble family: Stewart of Darnley
- Spouse: Catherine Seton
- Issue: John Stewart, 1st Earl of Lennox, Alexander Stewart of Galston
- Father: John Stewart of Darnley
- Mother: Elizabeth of Lennox

Sir Alan Stewart of Darnley, 2nd Lord of Concressault (after 1406 – 1439) was a Scottish nobleman of the Stewart of Darnley family, involved in the Hundred Years War.

== Life ==
The son of John Stewart of Darnley and Elizabeth, daughter of Donnchadh, Earl of Lennox, Darnley accompanied his father and brothers to fight in France.

Following his father's death at the Battle of the Herrings in 1429 during the Siege of Orléans, Darnley inherited his father's title of the Lordship of Concressault, but not the County of Évreux, nor the Lordship of Aubigny. He also inherited the title of Constable of the Scottish Army in France, and the chieftaincy of the Stewarts of Darnley.

By 1437, he had resigned his French territories to his younger brother, Sir John Stewart and returned to Scotland.

He became involved in a blood feud with the Boyd family of Dean Castle. Darnley was killed in 1439 by Sir Thomas Boyd of Kilmarnock, his death was avenged later that summer by his youngest brother Alexander Stewart at the Battle of Craignaught Hill.

== Marriage and issue ==
Alan Stewart of Darnley married Catherine Seton, daughter of Sir William Seton, Master of Seton and Janet Dunbar, herself a daughter of the Earl of Dunbar. They had issue:

- John Stewart, 1st Earl of Lennox
- Alexander Stewart of Galston

After Darnley's murder, his widow Catherine married Herbert Maxwell, 1st Lord Maxwell.
