= John Stewart of Darnley =

Scottish nobleman

John Stewart
- 1st Seigneur d'Aubigny, Comte d'Évreux, Seigneur de Concressault
- Arms of John Stewart of Darnley
- Predecessor: New creation
- Successor: John Stewart, 2nd Lord of Aubigny
- Born: c. 1380
- Died: 1429 (48 or 49 years); Rouvray-Sainte-Croix, Loiret, France
- Buried: Orléans Cathedral
- Noble family: Stewart of Darnley
- Spouse: Elizabeth of Lennox
- Issue: Alan Stewart of Darnley; John Stewart, 2nd Lord of Aubigny; Alexander Stewart
- Father: Alexander Stewart of Darnley

Sir John Stewart of Darnley, 1st Comte d'Évreux, 1st Seigneur de Concressault, 1st Seigneur d'Aubigny (c. 1380 – 1429) was a Scottish nobleman and famous military commander who served as Constable of the Scottish Army in France, supporting the French against the English during the Hundred Years War. He was a fourth cousin of King James I of Scotland (reigned 1406 to 1437), the third monarch of the House of Stewart. He was also a male-line ancestor of King James VI of Scotland.

Arms awarded in 1427 by King Charles VII of France to Sir John Stewart of Darnley, 1st Seigneur d'Aubigny, 1st Seigneur de Concressault and 1st Comte d'Évreux, Constable of the Scottish Army in France: Royal arms of France within a bordure gules charged with eight buckles or. To quarter his paternal arms of Stewart of Darnley: Or, a fess chequy azure and argent. The Buckles referred to his de Bonkyll ancestors of Bonkyll Castle in Scotland, whose canting arms were three buckles

== Life ==
The son of Sir Alexander Stewart of Darnley and Janet Keith, he was a distant cousin of the Stewart Kings of Scotland, being descended from the second son of Alexander Stewart, 4th High Steward of Scotland, Sir John Stewart of Bonkyll.

Darnley inherited his father's estates in 1404, and was knighted c. 1418. In 1418 the Dauphin of France asked James I, King of Scotland, for aid against the English, requesting Darnley by name, and he left in 1419 with the expeditionary force under the Earls of Buchan (Darnley's cousin) and Wigtown. By 1420 Darnley was referred to as Constable of the Scottish Army there.

Darnley fought at the Dauphin's first victory against the English at the Battle of Baugé in 1421. He was made Seigneur of Concressault in 1421. When the Dauphin became Charles VII King of France, Darnley entered his service, and Charles rewarded him with the seigneurie (lordship) of Aubigny-sur-Nère in 1422.

Charles ordered Darnley to cross the Loire and retake Auxerrois and Nevernois, and he besieged Cravant, but was defeated, captured and lost an eye. He was therefore not at the Battle of Verneuil, at which the Franco-Scottish army was heavily defeated. His ransom was reimbursed by Charles, and Darnley commanded the remaining Scots soldiers in France to form what became the Garde Écossaise, or Scottish Guards for the King of France.

Following a victory over the English at Mont Saint-Michel, Darnley was made Count of Évreux to compensate him for his expenses, and Darnley promised to relinquish it for 50,000 gold crowns. Darnley raised the siege of Montargis. Charles, unable to pay him, permitted him to quarter the Fleur-de-Lis to his coat of arms.

In 1428, he along with Renaud of Chartres, the Archbishop of Rheims, returned to Scotland to raise further troops, and to negotiate the future marriage between Princess Margaret of Scotland, and the Charles' son Louis. He returned again to France in 1429, where he took part in the Siege of Orléans where he arrived with 1000 men. Four days later, he commanded the Scottish contingent at the Battle of the Herrings, where he was killed, along with his brother William, who tried to rescue him.

John Stewart of Darnley was buried in the Sainte-Croix Cathedral, Orléans.

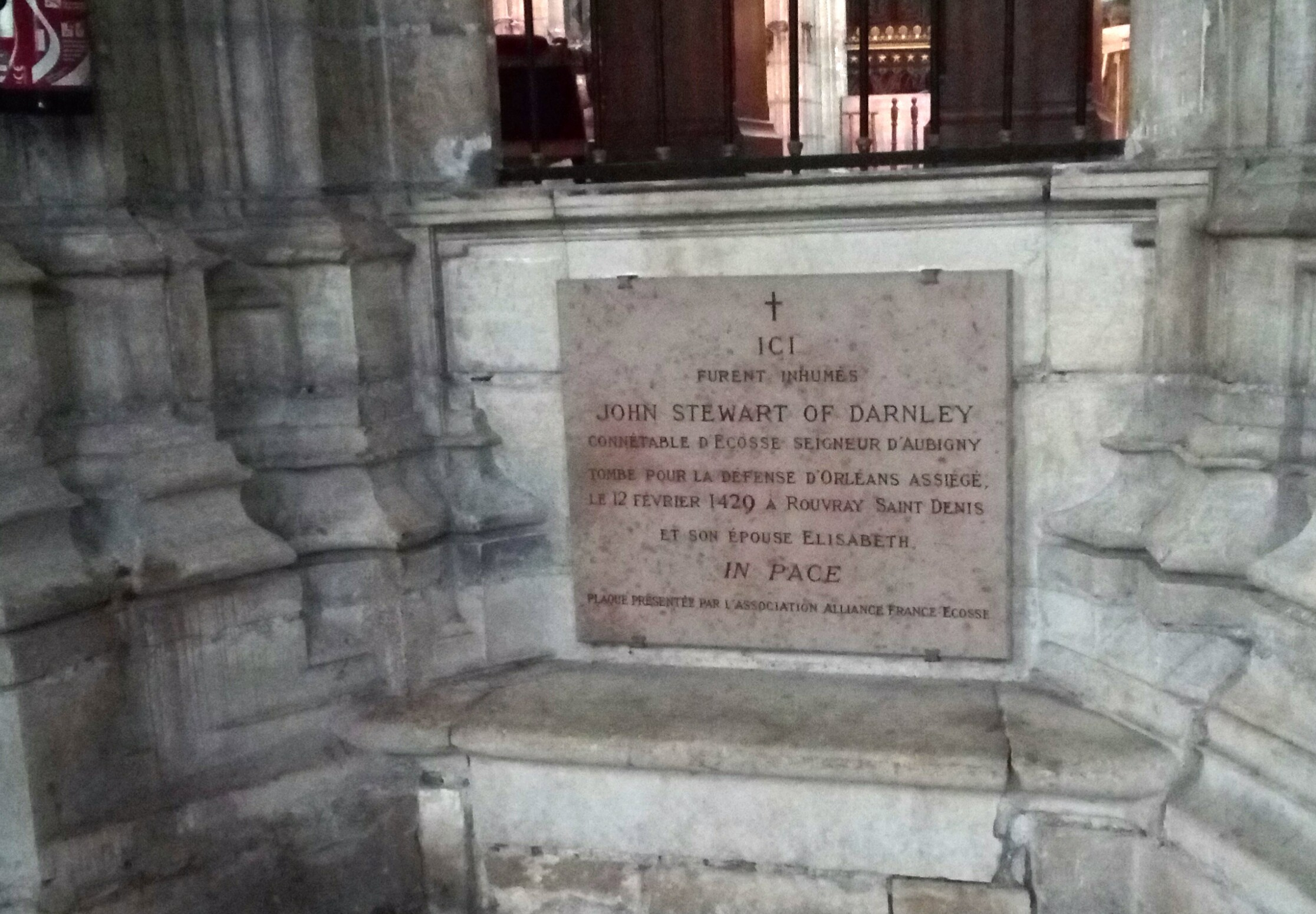
Tomb of John Stewart at Orleans

== Marriage ==
Darnley married Elizabeth, a daughter of Donnchadh, Earl of Lennox c. 1408. She remained in Scotland, but at some time followed Darnley to France, where she died 10 months after him and is buried beside him at Orléans. They had:

- Sir Alan Stewart of Darnley, from whom descend the Stewart Earls of Lennox, and James VI of Scotland.
- Sir John Stewart, 2nd Lord of Aubigny
- Alexander Stewart of Darnley

== See also ==
- Duke of Aubigny
- Duke of Richmond
- Duke of Lennox
- Earl of Lennox
- Auld Alliance
