= Duke of Richmond =

Title in the Peerage of England

Dukedom of Richmond is held with Dukedom of Lennox and Dukedom of Gordon
- Coat of Arms of the Dukedom of Richmond (Note: Quarterly: 1st and 4th grand quarters, the Royal Arms of Charles II (viz. quarterly: 1st and 4th, France and England quarterly; 2nd, Scotland; 3rd, Ireland); the whole within a bordure compony argent charged with roses gules barbed and seeded proper and the last; overall an escutcheon gules charged with three buckles or (Dukedom of Aubigny); 2nd grand quarter, argent a saltire engrailed gules between four roses of the second barbed and seeded proper (Lennox); 3rd grand quarter, quarterly, 1st, azure three boars' heads couped or (Gordon); 2nd, or three lions' heads erased gules (Badenoch); 3rd, or three crescents within a double tressure flory counter-flory gules (Seton); 4th, azure three cinquefoils argent (Fraser).)
- Creation date: 1675
- Created by: Charles II
- Peerage: Peerage of England
- First holder: Charles Lennox
- Present holder: Charles Gordon-Lennox, 11th Duke of Richmond
- Heir apparent: Charles Gordon Lennox, Earl of March and Kinrara
- Remainder to: the 1st Duke's heirs male of the body lawfully begotten
- Subsidiary titles: Earl of March; Earl of Darnley; Earl of Kinrara; Baron Settrington; Lord Torbolton; Duke of Aubigny
- Seat: Goodwood House
- Former seat: Gordon Castle

Duke of Richmond is a title in the Peerage of England that has been created four times in British history. It has been held by members of the royal Tudor and Stuart families.

The current dukedom of Richmond was created in 1675 (Note: Lennox's mother was a Breton noble, and it is thought that the Richmond title was chosen to allude to the extinct Earldom of Richmond which was held between 1136 and 1384 by members of the ducal family of Brittany.) for Charles Lennox, the illegitimate son of Charles II of England and one of his mistresses, the Breton noblewoman Louise de Penancoët de Kérouaille; Charles Lennox was also made Duke of Lennox a month later. Charles Gordon-Lennox, 6th Duke of Richmond was furthermore created Duke of Gordon in the Peerage of the United Kingdom in 1876, meaning that the Duke holds three dukedoms—plus, in pretence, the French Duchy of Aubigny-sur-Nère.

== History of the dukedom ==
Prior to the creation of the dukedom the early nobles of England associated with Richmondshire were Lords and Earls of Richmond. At times the honour of Richmond was held without a title. The dukedom of Richmond emerged under Henry VIII.

The first creation of a dukedom of Richmond (as Duke of Richmond and Somerset) was made in 1525 for Henry FitzRoy, an illegitimate son of Henry VIII. His mother was Elizabeth Blount. Upon the Duke's death without children in 1536, his titles became extinct.

The second creation was in 1623 for Ludovic Stewart, 2nd Duke of Lennox (see Lennox (district)) (1574–1624), who also held other titles in the peerage of Scotland. He was created Earl of Richmond and Baron Settrington in 1613 and Duke of Richmond in the peerage of England in 1623 as a member of the Lennox line (not unlike King James VI & I himself) in the House of Stuart. These became extinct at his death in 1624, but his Scottish honours devolved on his brother Esmé, Earl of March, who thus became 3rd Duke of Lennox in the peerage of Scotland. Esmé's son James, 4th Duke of Lennox (1612–1655) subsequently received the third creation of the dukedom of Richmond in 1641, when the two dukedoms again became united. In 1672, on the death of James' nephew Charles, 3rd Duke of Richmond and 6th Duke of Lennox, both titles again became extinct.

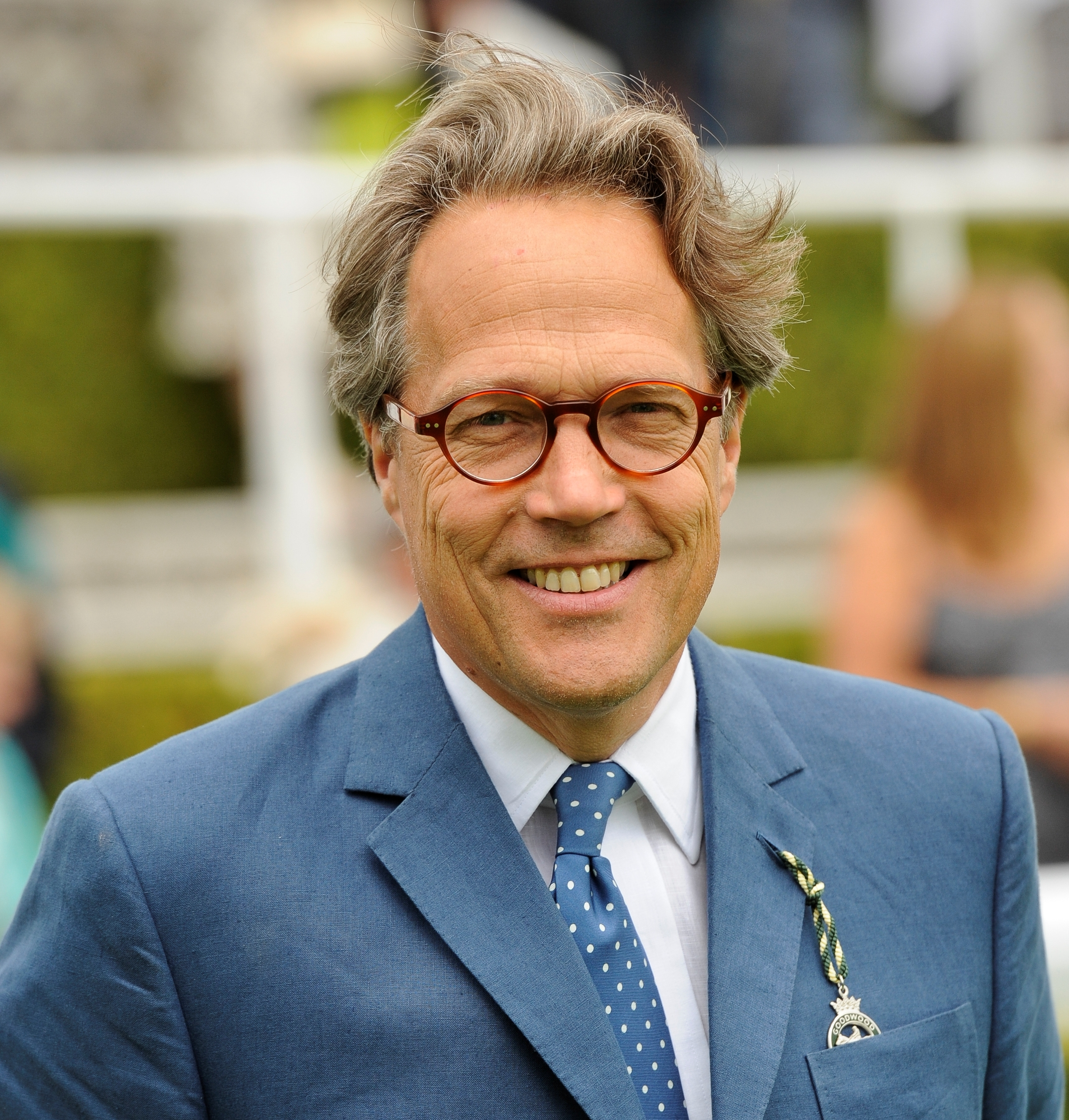
The 11th and current Duke, Charles Gordon Lennox.

The fourth creation of the dukedom of Richmond was in August 1675, when Charles II granted the title to Charles Lennox, his illegitimate son by Louise de Keroualle, Duchess of Portsmouth. Charles Lennox was further created Duke of Lennox a month later. Charles' son, also Charles, succeeded to the French title Duke of Aubigny (of Aubigny-sur-Nère) on the death of his grandmother in 1734. The 6th Duke of Richmond and Lennox was created Duke of Gordon (See Clan Gordon) in 1876. Thus, the Duke holds three (four, if the French Aubigny claim is accepted) dukedoms; three, equal since 2022 to Prince William, Duke of Cornwall, of Rothesay and of Cambridge.

The subsidiary titles of the dukedom created in 1675 are Earl of March (created 1675), Earl of Darnley (1675), Earl of Kinrara (1876), Baron Settrington, of Settrington in the County of York (1675), and Lord Torbolton (1675).

The Dukes of Richmond, Lennox and Gordon are normally styled Duke of Richmond and Gordon. Before the creation of the Dukedom of Gordon they were styled Duke of Richmond and Lennox. The titles Earl of March and Baron Settrington were created in the peerage of England along with the Dukedom of Richmond. The titles Earl of Darnley and Lord Torbolton were created in the peerage of Scotland along with the dukedom of Lennox. Finally, the title Earl of Kinrara was created in the peerage of the United Kingdom with the dukedom of Gordon. The eldest son of the Duke uses the courtesy title Earl of March and Kinrara. Before the creation of the Dukedom of Gordon, the courtesy title used was Earl of March.

== Estates and residences ==
=== Country seat ===
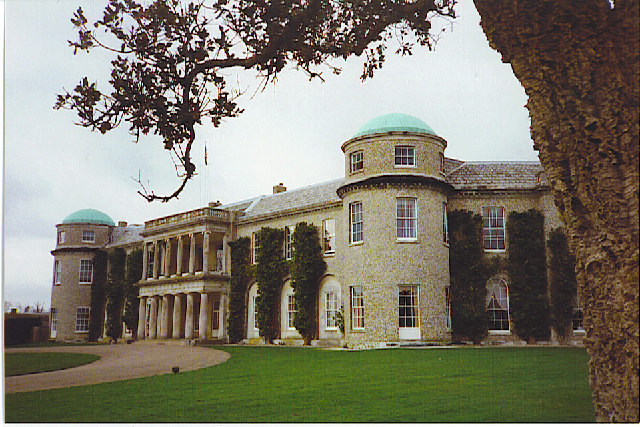
Goodwood House, the principal seat of the Dukes of Richmond since 1697

The family seat is Goodwood House near Chichester, West Sussex; the house and its 12,000-acre estate were acquired by Charles Lennox, 1st Duke of Richmond in 1697.

==== Former estates ====
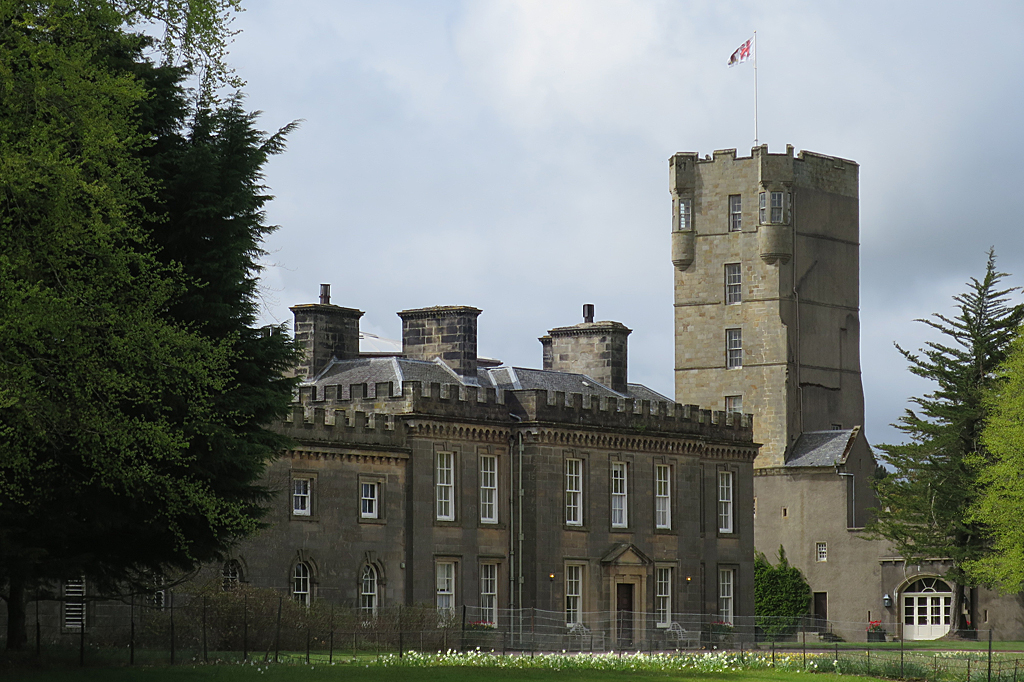
Gordon Castle, inherited by the 5th Duke of Richmond in 1836 and sold by the 9th Duke in 1937

In 1836 Charles Gordon-Lennox, 5th Duke of Richmond inherited Gordon Castle, near Fochabers in Scotland from his uncle George Gordon, 5th Duke of Gordon. The Dukes of Richmond continued to own the Gordon Castle estate until 1937.

In the 1883 edition of John Bateman's The Great Landowners of Great Britain and Ireland, Charles Gordon-Lennox, 6th Duke of Richmond and 1st Duke of Gordon's estates were recorded as spanning 286,400 acres across England and Scotland, including 160,000 acres in Banffshire, 69,600 acres in Aberdeenshire, 27,400 acres in Inverness-shire, 12,200 acres in Morayshire, and 17,100 acres in Sussex, which produced a combined annual income of £79,600.

The ducal estates had remained relatively intact by the time the 6th Duke died in 1903; however this had decreased to approximately 150,000 acres when the 8th Duke died in May 1935. In the months preceding his death, the 8th Duke sold the 45,000-acre Glenavon shooting estate in Banffshire to Lt. Col. Oliver Haig (Note: A nephew of Field Marshal Douglas Haig, 1st Earl Haig) of Ramornie House, Ladybank, Fife; the sale was finalised in January 1935.

Due to the heavy estate duties payable following the death of the 8th Duke, his son Frederick Gordon-Lennox, 9th Duke of Richmond sold much of the family's landed estate in Scotland during the mid-1930s.

The 12,000-acre Huntly estate in Aberdeenshire was sold in January 1936; at the time of the sale the estate's rental income was reported to be £9,000 annually. In November 1937 Gordon Castle, together with six villages and 90,000 acres of land in Morayshire and Banffshire producing an annual income of £55,000, was sold to the Crown Estate Commissioners. At the time of the sale, the Daily Telegraph reported the sale price as being £750,000; however, during a debate in the House of Commons in February 1939, the-then Minister for Agriculture Sir Reginald Dorman-Smith stated that the price paid was £525,000.

As a result of these land sales, by 1938 the ducal estates had been reduced to the 17,000-acre Goodwood Estate in Sussex, and 31,200 acres of deer forest and grouse moor centred on Glenfiddich Lodge in Morayshire. The 9th Duke later sold the Glenfiddich estate in May 1946 for £70,000 to Hugh Borthwick-Norton of Southwick House, Hampshire and Borthwick Castle, Midlothian.

=== London residences ===
==== Richmond House, Whitehall ====
The first Richmond House was built in c. 1660 on the former bowling green of the Palace of Whitehall, adjoining the Privy Garden, and was occupied from 1668 by Charles Stewart, 3rd Duke of Richmond. The dukedom became extinct on Stewart's death in 1672, after which his widow, Frances Stewart, Duchess of Richmond, continued to occupy the first Richmond House until her death in 1702, and the house reverted to the Crown.

The dukedom was subsequently recreated for Charles Lennox, 1st Duke of Richmond, an illegitimate son of Charles II. In 1711 Lennox obtained a lease of neighbouring Crown property at Whitehall, where he erected a second Richmond House. His son, Charles Lennox, 2nd Duke of Richmond, replaced his father's residence between 1733 and 1736 with a third, Palladian-style Richmond House, which was designed by Lord Burlington.

Lord Burlington's design for the third Richmond House, built for the 2nd Duke of Richmond in the 1730s

In 1738 the first Richmond House formerly occupied by the Stewart dukes was granted to the 2nd Duke, who demolished it to provide unobstructed views from his new residence. Following the 2nd Duke's death in 1750, the house was inherited by Charles Lennox, 3rd Duke of Richmond; in 1758 he established a gallery and school there for artists and sculptors, and parts of the house were remodelled to designs by James Wyatt in 1782. The house was later gutted by fire in December 1791 and was not rebuilt. A later parliamentary account stated, however, that the Duke continued to reside in the part of the premises which had survived the fire.

In 1819 Charles Gordon-Lennox, 5th Duke of Richmond indicated his willingness to dispose of the remaining leasehold interest in Richmond House to the Commissioners of Woods and Forests. According to an 1830 House of Commons debate, the interest was valued at £5,000, from which the Commissioners deducted £700 in respect of the Duke's obligation under the lease to repair damage sustained in the 1791 fire, leaving £4,300 to be paid for the remainder of the lease. The transaction was ultimately completed in March 1822, after which the ruined mansion a neighbouring house which had been formerly occupied by the Earls of Loudoun and Mar were cleared for redevelopment. A terrace of eight large houses, Richmond Terrace, was constructed on the site between 1822 and 1824.

==== Upper Grosvenor Street and Cavendish Square ====
In April 1820 the 5th Duke and his family subsequently took up residence at a new London house in Upper Grosvenor Street, and later maintained his London residence in Cavendish Square from c. 1830 until c. 1834.

==== Richmond House, Portland Place ====
In 1837 the 5th Duke of Richmond leased a new London townhouse at No. 50 Portland Place, which continued to be his London residence until he died at the house in 1860. He was succeeded by his son, Charles Gordon-Lennox, 6th Duke of Richmond, whilst the 5th Duke's widow Caroline, Dowager Duchess of Richmond, continued to live at 50 Portland Place until her own death in March 1874.

==== Belgrave Square ====
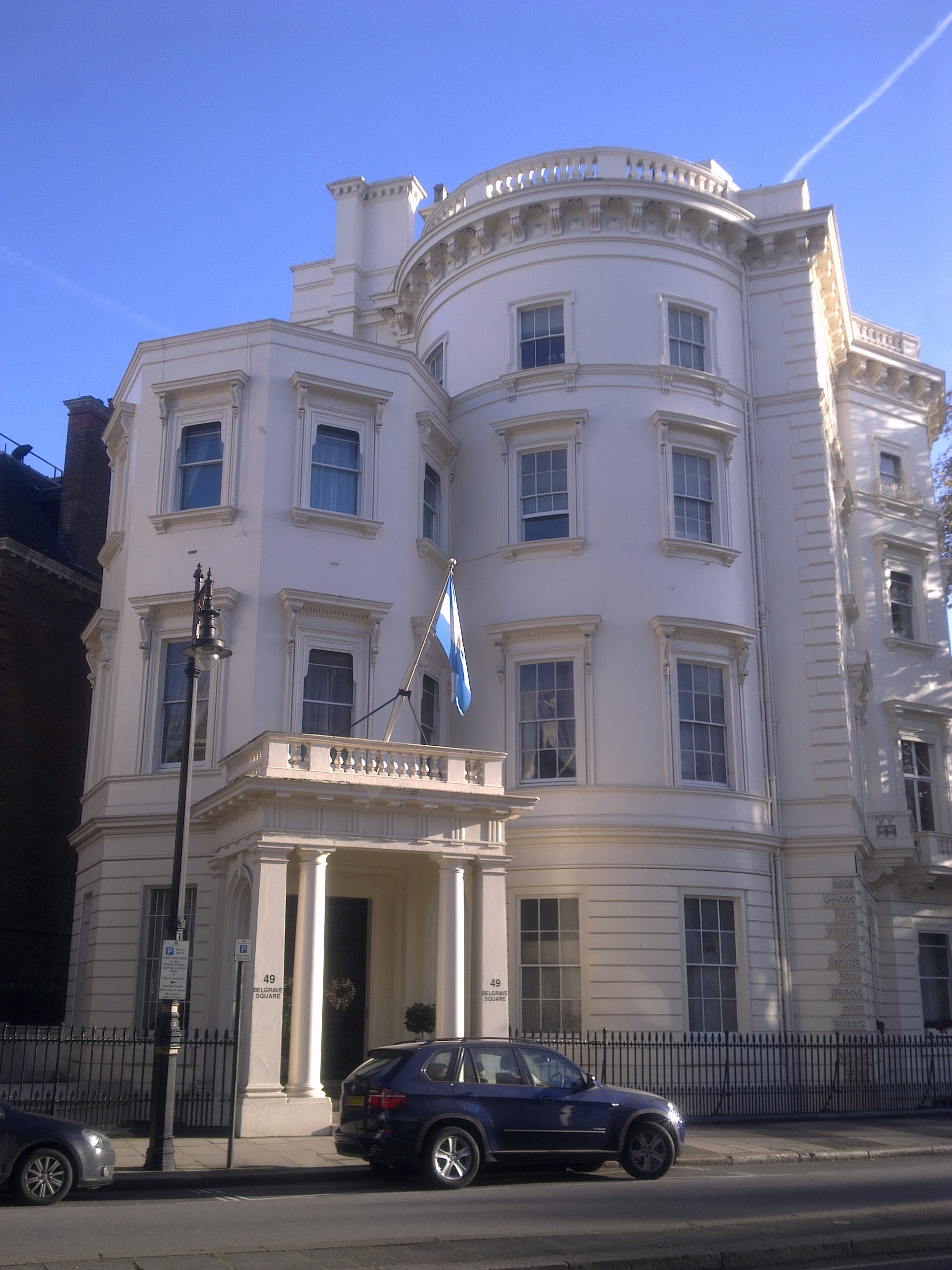
49 Belgrave Square, the London residence of the 6th Duke of Richmond from 1862 to 1903

Following the death of Sidney Herbert, 1st Baron Herbert of Lea in 1861, the lease of his London house, No. 49 Belgrave Square, was acquired by the 6th Duke of Richmond in May 1862. The house was used as the residence of the Duke of Richmond and his family for the remainder of the nineteenth century; following the 6th Duke's death in 1903, the lease of the house was sold to the financier Otto Beit in January 1904. At the time of the sale, the lease had a remaining term of 16 years, with a ground rent payable of £150 annually for the house and £40 annually for the associated stabling.

==== Lowndes Square, Upper Belgrave Street and Cadogan Square ====
Following his succession to the Dukedom in 1903, Charles Gordon-Lennox, 7th Duke of Richmond took a lease of No. 54 Lowndes Square in January 1904. He maintained the house as his London residence until the lease was sold in April 1910. The Duke had previously attempted to sell his interest in the house at auction in July 1909, but the lease, which then had an unexpired term of approximately 19 years, was withdrawn when bidding failed to exceed £8,500.

Following the sale of 54 Lowndes Square the Duke did not immediately establish a new London residence; eventually he purchased the lease of No. 3 Upper Belgrave Street in March 1912, which served as his London house until mid-1923. By September 1923 the Duke had leased a new London townhouse at No. 67 Cadogan Square, which continued to be his London home until his death in January 1928. In the months following the 7th Duke’s death his successor Charles Gordon-Lennox, 8th Duke of Richmond maintained a household at 67 Cadogan Square until the lease was sold in October 1928.

==== Norfolk Crescent ====
During the late 1920s the 8th Duke’s only surviving son, Frederick, Earl of March had taken a lease of No. 12 Norfolk Crescent, where his first child Charles, Lord Settrington was born on 19 September 1929. Following Lord March's accession as the 9th Duke of Richmond in 1935, he continued to maintain 12 Norfolk Crescent as his London residence until at least 1937, although Dods Parliamentary Companion continued to record the Duke's London address as No. 12 Norfolk Crescent until the publication of its 1944 edition.

== List of dukes ==
=== Duke of Richmond and Somerset (1525) ===
Created by Henry VIII of England
#	Name (Lifespan)	Tenure as duke	Duchess	Notes	Other titles
1	Henry FitzRoy (1519–1536)	1525–1536	Mary Howard	Extramarital son of Henry VIII	Earl of Nottingham

=== Duke of Richmond (1623) ===
Created by James I of England
#	Name (Lifespan)	Tenure as duke	Duchess	Notes	Other titles
1	Ludovic Stewart (1574–1624)	1623–1624	Frances Howard	Second cousin and favourite of James I	Duke of Lennox; Earl of Lennox; Earl of Richmond

=== Dukes of Richmond (1641) ===
Created by Charles I of England
#	Name (Lifespan)	Tenure as duke	Duchess(es)	Notes	Other titles
1	James Stewart (1612–1655)	1641–1655	Mary Villiers	Nephew of Ludovic Stewart, Duke of Richmond	Duke of Lennox; Earl of Lennox; Earl of March; Baron Clifton
2	Esmé Stewart (1649–1660)	1655–1660	unmarried	Son of the preceding	Duke of Lennox; Earl of Lennox; Earl of March; Baron Clifton
3	Charles Stewart (1639–1672)	1660–1672	Margaret Banaster Lewis; Frances Teresa Stewart	Cousin of the preceding	Duke of Lennox; Earl of Lennox; Earl of March; Earl of Lichfield; Baron Clifton

=== Dukes of Richmond (1675) ===
Created by Charles II of England
No.	Name (Lifespan)	Tenure as duke	Duchess(es)	Notes	Other titles
1	Charles Lennox (1672–1723)	1675–1723	Anne Brudenell	Extramarital son of Charles II	Duke of Lennox; Earl of March; Earl of Darnley; Baron Settrington; Lord Torbolton
2	Charles Lennox (1701–1750)	1723–1750	Sarah Cadogan	Son of the preceding	Duke of Lennox; Earl of March; Earl of Darnley; Baron Settrington; Lord Torbolton
3	Charles Lennox (1735–1806)	1750–1806	Mary Bruce	Son of the preceding	Duke of Lennox; Earl of March; Earl of Darnley; Baron Settrington; Lord Torbolton
4	Charles Lennox (1764–1819)	1806–1819	Charlotte Gordon	Nephew of the preceding	Duke of Lennox; Earl of March; Earl of Darnley; Baron Settrington; Lord Torbolton
5	Charles Gordon Lennox (1791–1860)	1819–1860	Caroline Paget	Son of the preceding	Duke of Lennox; Earl of March; Earl of Darnley; Baron Settrington; Lord Torbolton
6	Charles Henry Gordon Lennox (1818–1903)	1860–1903	Frances Greville	Son of the preceding	Duke of Lennox; Duke of Gordon; Earl of March; Earl of Darnley; Earl of Kinrara; Baron Settrington; Lord Torbolton
7	Charles Henry Gordon Lennox (1845–1928)	1903–1928	widowed	Son of the preceding	Duke of Lennox; Duke of Gordon; Earl of March; Earl of Darnley; Earl of Kinrara; Baron Settrington; Lord Torbolton
8	Charles Henry Gordon Lennox (1870–1935)	1928–1935	Hilda Brassey	Son of the preceding	Duke of Lennox; Duke of Gordon; Earl of March; Earl of Darnley; Earl of Kinrara; Baron Settrington; Lord Torbolton
9	Frederick Charles Gordon Lennox (1904–1989)	1935–1989	Elizabeth Hudson	Son of the preceding	Duke of Lennox; Duke of Gordon; Earl of March; Earl of Darnley; Earl of Kinrara; Baron Settrington; Lord Torbolton
10	Charles Henry Gordon Lennox (1929–2017)	1989–2017	Susan Grenville-Grey	Son of the preceding	Duke of Lennox; Duke of Gordon; Earl of March; Earl of Darnley; Earl of Kinrara; Baron Settrington; Lord Torbolton
11	Charles Henry Gordon Lennox (b. 1955)	since 2017	Janet Elizabeth Astor	Son of the preceding	Duke of Lennox; Duke of Gordon; Earl of March; Earl of Darnley; Earl of Kinrara; Baron Settrington; Lord Torbolton

The heir apparent is Charles Henry Gordon Lennox, Earl of March and Kinrara (b. 1994), eldest son of the 11th and present Duke.

== Line of succession (simplified) ==
- Charles Henry Gordon-Lennox, 6th Duke of Richmond (1818–1903)
  - Charles Henry Gordon-Lennox, 7th Duke of Richmond (1845–1928)
    - Charles Henry Gordon-Lennox, 8th Duke of Richmond (1870–1935)
      - Frederick Charles Gordon-Lennox, 9th Duke of Richmond (1904–1989)
        - Charles Henry Gordon Lennox, 10th Duke of Richmond (1929–2017)
          - Charles Henry Gordon-Lennox, 11th Duke of Richmond (b. 1955)
            - (1) Charles Henry Gordon Lennox, styled Earl of March and Kinrara (b. 1994)
            - (2) William Rupert Gordon Lennox (b. 1996)
            - (3) Frederick Lysander Gordon Lennox (b. 2000)
    - Esmé Charles Gordon-Lennox (1875–1949)
      - Reginald Arthur Charles Gordon Lennox (1910–1965)
        - male issue in line
    - Bernard Charles Gordon Lennox (1878–1914)
      - George Charles Gordon Lennox (1908–1988)
        - Bernard Charles Gordon Lennox (1932–2017)
          - male issue in line
        - other male issue in line
      - Alexander Henry Charles Gordon Lennox (1911–1987)
        - male issue in line
  - Walter Charles Gordon-Lennox (1865–1922)
    - Victor Charles Hugh Gordon Lennox (1897–1968)
      - male issue in line

== Coat of arms (full achievement) ==
Coat of arms of Charles Gordon Lennox, Duke of Richmond
Adopted 1876 Coronet Coronet of a Duke Crest 1st, a Bull's Head erased Sable horned Or; 2nd, on a Chapeau Gules turned up Ermine a Lion statant guardant Or crowned with a Ducal Coronet Gules and gorged with a Collar company of four pieces Argent charged with eight Roses Gules and the last; 3rd, out of a Ducal Coronet a Stag's Head affrontée proper attired with ten Tynes Or Helm Open barred helmet Escutcheon Quarterly: 1st and 4th grand quarters, the Royal Arms of Charles II (viz. quarterly: 1st and 4th, France and England quarterly; 2nd, Scotland; 3rd, Ireland); the whole within a bordure company argent charged with roses gules barbed and seeded proper and the last; overall an escutcheon gules charged with three buckles or (Dukedom of Aubigny); 2nd grand quarter, argent a saltire engrailed gules between four roses of the second barbed and seeded proper (Lennox); 3rd grand quarter, quarterly, 1st, azure three boars' heads couped or (Gordon); 2nd, or three lions' heads erased gules (Badenoch); 3rd, or three crescents within a double tressure flory counter-flory gules (Seton); 4th, azure three cinquefoils argent (Fraser). Motto 1st crest: Avant Darnlie (referring to Stuart dynasty); 2nd crest: En La Rose Je Fleuris (Anglo-Norman: "I flourish in the rose"); 3rd crest: Bydand (war cry of Clan Gordon)

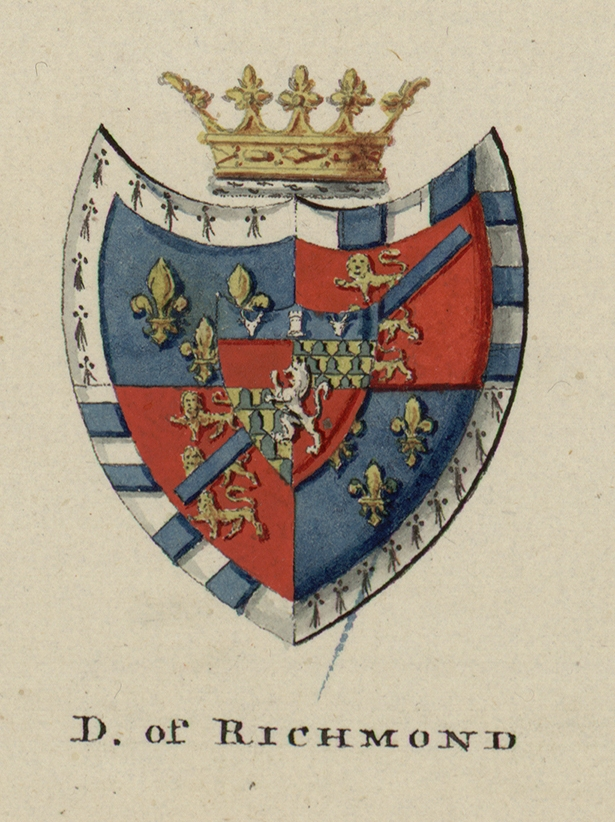
Coat of arms from A tour in Wales by Thomas Pennant; c. 1773–1776

The earlier dukes (creations of 1623 and 1641) bore: Quarterly 1 and 4 azure three fleurs-de-lis and a bordure engrailed Or; 2 and 3 Or a fess chequy azure and argent, a bordure gules semy of buckles Or (Stewart of Bonkyl); overall an inescutcheon of Lennox.

Henry Fitzroy, Duke of Richmond and Somerset (creation of 1525), bore the Tudor royal arms (quarterly France and England) with a border quarterly ermine (for Brittany) and compony azure and argent (for Somerset), a baton sinister argent for bastardy, and overall an escutcheon of Nottingham.

== Family tree ==
Lennox, Richmond, and Gordon family tree including peerages of Aboyne, Aubigny, Enzie, Gordon, Huntly, Inverness, Kinrara, Lennox, March, Meldrum, Richmond, Settrington, and Strathaven, Balmore, Auchindoun, Garthie and Kincardine

Henry of Scotland; 1114–1152; Earl of Northumbria, Earl of Huntingdon
Mormaer of Lennox (1st creation), 12th century
Malcolm IV; 1141–1165; Earl of Huntingdon, later King of Scotland	William I c. 1142–1214; Earl of Huntingdon, later King of Scotland	David; 1152–1219; Mormaer of Lennox, Earl of Huntingdon	Ailín I d. c. 1200 possibly Mormaer of Lennox
Isobel of Huntingdon; 1199–1251	Ailín II d. 1217; Mormaer of Lennox
Robert V de Brus c. 1210–1295	Maol Domhnaich (Maldoven) d. 1250; Mormaer of Lennox	?	Gille Chriosd	Alexander Stewart c. 1214–1283; High Steward of Scotland
Robert VI de Brus; 1243–1304	Maol Choluim (Malcolm) I d. 1303; Mormaer of Lennox	Amlaibh	Clan MacFarlane	John Stewart d. 1298
Robert I 1274–1329; King of Scotland	Maol Choluim (Malcolm) II d. 1333; Mormaer of Lennox	?
Marjorie Bruce; 1296–1316	Domhnall (Donald) d. 1365; Mormaer of Lennox	?	Alan Stewart of Dreghorn d. 1333
Edward III; 1312–1377; King of England	Robert II; 1316–1390; King of Scotland	Margaret; Countess of Lennox (?)	Walter of Faslane (also Baltar mac Amlaimh) de facto Mormaer of Lennox	Alexander Stewart of Darnley d. 1374
Resigned, 1385
Earl of Richmond (5th creation), 1342
John of Gaunt; 1340–1399; Duke of Lancaster; Earl of Richmond	Adam de Gordon d. 1402; Lord of Gordon	Robert III; 1337–1406; King of Scots	Robert Stewart c. 1340–1420; Duke of Albany	Donnchadh; Mormaer of Lennox r. 1385–1425	Alexander Stewart of Darnley d. 1404
Earldom of Richmond (5th creation) surrendered, 1372
Lord of (Seigneur d')Aubigny, 1422
Henry IV; 1367–1413; King of England	John Beaufort; 1373–1410; Earl of Somerset	Elizabeth Gordon d. 1439 m. Alexander Seton d. 1440 or 1441; Lord Gordon	Murdoch Stewart; 1362-1425; Duke of Albany	Isabella d. 1458; Countess of Lennox	Elizabeth	John Stewart of Darnley c. 1380–1429; 1st Comte d'Évreux, Seigneur de Concressault, 1st Lord of Aubigny
Earldom of Lennox (1st creation) extinct, 1458
Earl of Richmond (6th creation), 1414	Earl of Huntly, 1445
John of Lancaster; 1389–1435; Duke of Bedford, Earl of Richmond	John Beaufort c. 1403–1444; Duke of Somerset	Alexander Seton (Gordon) d. 1470; 1st Earl of Huntly	James I 1394–1437; King of Scots	Joan Beaufort c. 1404–1445	James Stewart c. 1399 – c. 1451; Black Knight of Lorn	Alan Stewart of Darnley after 1406 – 1439	John Stewart d. 1482; 2nd Lord of Aubigny
Earldom of Richmond (6th creation) extinct, 1435
Earl of Richmond (7th creation), 1452	Earl of Lennox (2nd creation), 1488
Edmund Tudor; 1430–1456; 1st Earl of Richmond	Margaret Beaufort; 1443–1509	George Gordon d. 1501; 2nd Earl of Huntly	Annabella of Scotland c. 1433–1509	James II; 1430–1460; King of Scots	John Stewart a. 1430–1495; 1st Earl of Lennox	John Stewart c. 1440–1512; Earl of Atholl	Bernard Stewart c. 1452 – 1508; 3rd Lord of Aubigny
Henry Tudor; 1457–1509; 2nd Earl of Richmond, Later King Henry VII	James III; 1451–1488; King of Scots	Mary Stewart; 1453–1488
Earldom of Richmond (7th creation) merged into the Crown, 1509
Elizabeth Stewart d. after 1531	Matthew Stewart; 1460–1513; 2nd Earl of Lennox	Robert Stewart c. 1470–1544; 4th Lord of Aubigny	Anne
Henry VIII; 1491–1547; King of England	Alexander Gordon d. 1524; 3rd Earl of Huntly	James IV; 1473–1513; King of Scots	Margaret Tudor; 1489–1541	Archibald Douglas; 1489–1557; Earl of Angus	John Stewart c. 1490–1526; 3rd Earl of Lennox	Elizabeth Stewart
John Gordon d. 1517; Lord Gordon	Margaret Stewart b. 1498)
Earl of Lennox (4th creation), 1578
Duke of Richmond and Somerset, 1525	Earl of March (3rd Scottish creation), 1581
Henry Fitzroy; 1519–1536; Duke of Richmond and Somerset	George Gordon; 1514–1562; 4th Earl of Huntly	James V 1512–1542; King of Scots	Margaret Douglas; 1515–1578	Matthew Stewart; 1516–1571; 4th Earl of Lennox	Robert Stewart c. 1522–1586; Earl of Lennox, Earl of March	John Stewart d. 1567; 5th Lord of Aubigny
Dukedom of Richmond and Somerset extinct, 1536	Earldom of Lennox (2nd creation) merged with crown, 1571	Earldom of Lennox (4th creation) "exchanged" for the Earldom of March, 1580
Earl of Lennox (3rd creation), c. 1571	Earl of Lennox (5th creation), 1580; Duke of Lennox (1st creation), 1581
George Gordon d. 1576; 5th Earl of Huntly	Mary; 1542–1587; Queen of Scots	Henry Stuart; 1545–1567; Lord Darnley	Charles Stuart; 1557–1576; Earl of Lennox	Esmé Stewart; 1542–1583; Duke of Lennox, etc., 6th Lord of Aubigny
Earldom of Lennox (3rd creation) extinct, 1576
Earl of Richmond, Baron Settrington (1st creation), 1613
Marquess of Huntly, Earl of Enzie, and Lord Gordon of Badenoch, 1599	Duke of Richmond (1st creation), 1623	Earl of March (3rd English creation), 1619
George Gordon; 1562–1636; 1st Marquess of Huntly, etc., 6th Earl of Huntly	James VI and I 1566–1625; King of England and Scotland	Ludovic Stewart; 1574–1623; 2nd Duke of Lennox, 1st Duke of Richmond, etc.	Esmé Stewart; 1579–1624; 3rd Duke of Lennox, 2nd Earl of Richmond, 3rd Baron Settrington, 1st Earl of March, 7th Lord of Aubigny
Dukedom of Richmond, Earldom of Richmond and Settrington Barony extinct, 1623
Viscount Aboyne, 1632	Duke of Richmond (2nd creation), 1641
George Gordon c. 1592–1649; 2nd Marquess of Huntly, etc., 7th Earl of Huntly, 1st Viscount Aboyne	Charles I 1600–1649; King of England and Scotland	James Stewart; 1612–1655; 4th Duke of Lennox, 1st Duke of Richmond, 2nd Earl of March	Henry Stewart; 1616–1632; 8th Lord of Aubigny	George Stewart; 1618–1642; 9th Lord of Aubigny	Ludovic Stewart; 1619–1665; 10th Lord of Aubigny
Duke of Aubigny (France), 1684	Earl of Aboyne and Lord Gordon of Strathaven and Glenlivet, 1660
James Gordon c. 1620–1649; 2nd Viscount Aboyne	Lewis Gordon c. 1626–1653; 3rd Marquess of Huntly, etc., 8th Earl of Huntly	Charles II; 1630–1685; King of England and Scotland	Louise de Kérousaille; 1649–1734; Duchess of Portsmouth, Duchess of Aubigny	Charles Gordon c. 1638–1681; 1st Earl of Aboyne, etc.	Esmé Stewart; 1649–1660; 5th Duke of Lennox, 2nd Duke of Richmond, 3rd Earl of March	Charles Stewart; 1639–1672; 6th Duke of Lennox, 3rd Duke of Richmond, 4th Earl of March, 11th Lord of Aubigny
Aboyne Viscountcy extinct, 1649	Dukedoms of Lennox and Richmond, earl of March (3rd English creation), and lordship of Aubigny extinct, 1672
Duke of Gordon (1st creation), Viscount of Inverness, and Lord Strathaven, Balmore, Auchindoun, Garthie and Kincardine, 1684	Duke of Richmond (3rd creation), Duke of Lennox (2nd creation), Earl of March (4th English creation), Earl of Darnley, Baron Settrington of Settrington in the County of York (2nd creation), and Lord Torbolton, 1675
George Gordon; 1st Duke of Gordon, etc., 4th Marquess of Huntly, etc., 9th Earl of Huntly	Charles Lennox; 1672–1723; 1st Duke of Richmond and Duke of Lennox, etc., Duke of Aubigny	Charles Gordon c. 1670–1702; 2nd Earl of Aboyne, etc.
Alexander Gordon; 1720–1752; 2nd Duke of Gordon, etc., 5th Marquess of Huntly, etc., 10th Earl of Huntly	Charles Lennox; 1701–1750; 2nd Duke of Richmond and Duke of Lennox, etc., Duke of Aubigny	John Gordon d. 1732; 3rd Earl of Aboyne, etc.
Cosmo George Gordon; 1720–1752; 3rd Duke of Gordon, etc., 6th Marquess of Huntly, etc., 11th Earl of Huntly	Charles Lennox; 1735–1806; 3rd Duke of Richmond and Duke of Lennox, etc., Duke of Aubigny	George Lennox; 1737–1805	Charles Gordon c. 1726–1794; 4th Earl of Aboyne, etc.
Baron Gordon of Huntly, 1784
Alexander Gordon; 1743–1827; 4th Duke of Gordon, etc., 7th Marquess of Huntly, etc., 12th Earl of Huntly, 1st Earl of Norwich, 1st Baron Gordon of Huntly
Baron Meldrum of Morven in the County of Aberdeen, 1815; Marquess of Huntly reverted, 1838
George Duncan Gordon; 1770–1836; 5th Duke of Gordon, etc., 8th Marquess of Huntly, etc., 13th Earl of Huntly, 5th Earl of Enzie, 2nd Earl of Norwich, 2nd Baron Gordon of Huntly	Lady Charlotte Gordon; 1768–1842	Charles Lennox; 1764–1819; 4th Duke of Richmond and Duke of Lennox, etc., Duke of Aubigny, etc.	George Gordon; 1761–1853; 9th Marquess of Huntly, 14th Earl of Huntly, 5th Earl of Aboyne, etc., 1st Baron Meldrum
Dukedom of Gordon (1st creation), earldom of Norwich (4th creation), earldom of Enzie, viscountcy of Inverness, lordship Strathaven, Balmore, Auchindoun, Garthie and Kincardine, barony Gordon of Huntly extinct, 1836; Marquessate and earldom of Huntly continued with George Gordon, 5th Earl of Aboyne
Charles Gordon-Lennox; 1791–1860; 5th Duke of Richmond and Duke of Lennox, etc., Duke of Aubigny, etc.	Charles Gordon; 1792–1863; 10th Marquess of Huntly, 15th Earl of Huntly, 6th Earl of Aboyne, etc., 2nd Baron Meldrum
Duke of Gordon (2nd creation) and Earl of Kinrara, 1876
Charles Henry Gordon-Lennox; 1818–1903; 6th Duke of Richmond and Duke of Lennox, 1st Duke of Gordon, etc., 6th Duke of Aubigny, etc.
Charles Henry Gordon-Lennox; 1845–1928; 7th Duke of Richmond and Duke of Lennox, 2nd Duke of Gordon, etc., 7th Duke of Aubigny, etc.	Charles Gordon; 1847–1937; 11th Marquess of Huntly, 16th Earl of Huntly, 7th Earl of Aboyne, etc., 3rd Baron Meldrum	Granville Armyne Gordon; 1856–1907
Charles Henry Gordon-Lennox; 1870–1935; 8th Duke of Richmond and Duke of Lennox, 8th Duke of Aubigny, etc. 3rd Duke of Gordon, etc.	Granville Cecil Douglas Gordon; 1883–1930
Charles Henry Gordon-Lennox; 1899–1919; Lord Settrington	Frederick Charles Gordon-Lennox; 1904–1989; 9th Duke of Richmond and Duke of Lennox, 9th Duke of Aubigny, etc., 4th Duke of Gordon, etc.	Douglas Charles Lindsey Gordon; 1908–1987; 12th Marquess of Huntly, 18th Earl of Huntly, 8th Earl of Aboyne, etc., 4th Baron Meldrum
Charles Henry Gordon-Lennox; 1929–2017; 10th Duke of Richmond and Duke of Lennox, 10th Duke of Aubigny, etc., 5th Duke of Gordon, etc.
Charles Gordon-Lennox b. 1955; 11th Duke of Richmond and Duke of Lennox, 11th Duke of Aubigny, etc., 6th Duke of Gordon, etc.	Granville Charles Gomer Gordon b. 1944; 13th Marquess of Huntly, 18th Earl of Huntly, 9th Earl of Aboyne, etc., 5th Baron Meldrum
Charles Henry Gordon-Lennox b. 1994 styled Earl of March and Kinrara	Alastair Gordon b. 1973 styled Earl of Aboyne
Heir apparent to the dukedoms of Richmond, Lennox, Aubigny, and Gordon	Heir apparent to the marquessate of Huntly

== See also ==
- Earl of Newcastle
