= Earl of Lennox =

Scottish title

Earldom of Lennox
- Arms of Lennox: Argent, a saltire between four roses gules
- Creation date: 12th century
- Peerage: Peerage of Scotland
- First holder: David of Scotland, Earl of Huntingdon (first known)
- Former seats: Balloch Castle; Crookston Castle

The Earl or Mormaer of Lennox was the ruler of the region of the Lennox in western Scotland. It was first created in the 12th century for David of Scotland, Earl of Huntingdon and later held by the Stewart dynasty.

== Ancient earls ==
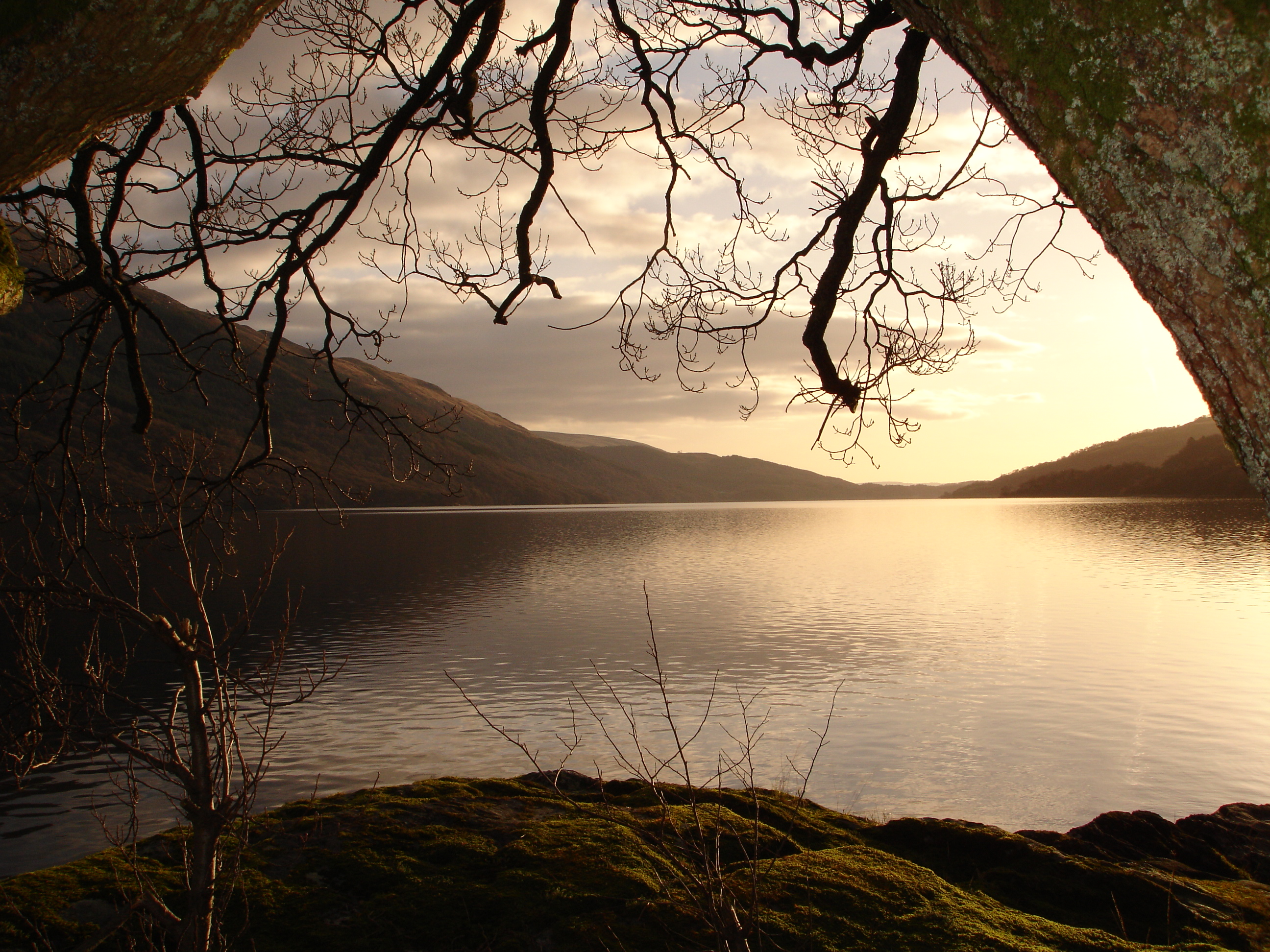
Loch Lomond, the heart of the Lennox

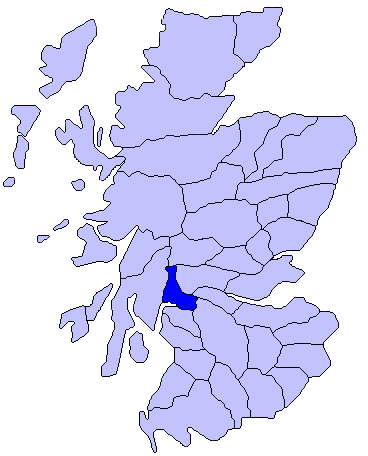
Map of Scotland showing the Lennox

The first earl recorded is Ailin I, sometimes called 'Alwin'. He is traditionally said to have been created Earl of Lennox by King Malcolm IV in 1154, but this is likely too early a date. [Note: Other sources say Arkil (Arkyll) was the first mormaer. He fled Northumberland for Scotland about 1070 and was made Mormaer of Levenax by Malcolm. That title was in the 12th century changed to earl of Lennox.] The earldom may in fact have been created in the late twelfth century by King William the Lion for his brother David, and after David gained the higher title Earl of Huntingdon, he resigned the Earldom of Lennox and it passed to Ailin.

Earl Ailin's parentage and background is unknown. His line continued as Earls of Lennox until the time of Earl Duncan in the fifteenth century. Duncan's daughter Isabella married Murdoch, son of Robert, Duke of Albany. Duncan hoped this marriage would improve the family's prospects, but it would in fact be their downfall. Duke Robert had murdered David, the heir to the throne, and when David's brother James became king, he wreaked his vengeance: almost the entire family were executed, including Earl Duncan, despite the fact he had had no part in the murder.

Isabella was imprisoned in Tantallon Castle, but she escaped execution, and succeeded her father as Countess of Lennox. All four of her sons died in her lifetime: two from King James's retribution, and two from natural causes. She had several grandsons, but none of them were legitimate, and the earldom therefore died with her around the year 1457.

== Stewart earls ==
Arms of Stewart of Darnley, Earls of Lennox: Or, a fess chequy argent and azure

In 1473 the earldom was reclaimed by Sir John Stewart of Darnley, who was the grandson of Elizabeth Lennox, daughter to Earl Duncan and sister to Countess Isabella. In 1565 his great-great-great-grandson Henry, Lord Darnley married Mary, Queen of Scots. He would be murdered at Kirk o' Field in 1567, and therefore on the death of his father Earl Matthew, the earldom of Lennox passed to James, the son of Henry and Mary. James would accede as King of Scots a few months later, and the title consequently merged with the Crown.

In 1572, the earldom was conferred upon King James's uncle Charles. He did not long enjoy the title, for he died four years later at the age of twenty-one. It was next granted to the king's great-uncle Robert in 1578. This Robert, described as being "symple and of lyttle action or accomte", was persuaded to exchange the earldom of Lennox for the earldom of March, so that the king could give the former title to his friend and cousin Esmé. In 1581, Esmé's earldom was raised to a dukedom, and his line continued as Dukes of Lennox until the time of his great-grandson Charles, who died childless in 1672 after drowning at Elsinore while on a diplomatic mission to the Danish government.

In 1675, the Dukedom of Lennox was conferred upon Charles, bastard son of King Charles II, along with the English Dukedom of Richmond and several other titles. However, he would later sell his lands in the Lennox to the Duke of Montrose, meaning he became Duke of Lennox in name alone. This line survives today, and is currently headed by another Charles. Despite being Stewarts, they used "Lennox" as their surname, which was changed to "Gordon-Lennox" in the 19th century after the fourth Duke married Lady Charlotte Gordon, sister and heiress to George, Duke of Gordon.

== List of earls and dukes of Lennox ==
=== Earls of Lennox (12th century) ===
- David, Earl of Huntingdon (died 1219) [first known holder]
- Ailin I, Earl of Lennox (d. c. 1200)
- Ailin II, Earl of Lennox (d. 1217)
- Maldouen, Earl of Lennox (d. 1250)
- Malcolm I, Earl of Lennox (d. 1303)
- Malcolm II, Earl of Lennox (d. 1333)
- Donald, Earl of Lennox (d. 1365)
- Margaret, Countess of Lennox (?) (resigned 1385)
  m. Walter of Faslane, descendant of the second Earl.
- Duncan, Earl of Lennox (d. 1425)
- Isabella, Countess of Lennox (d. 1458)
  m. Murdoch Stewart, Duke of Albany

The title became extinct c. 1459, as all four sons of Countess Isabella died without legitimate issue.

=== Earls of Lennox (2nd creation) (1488) ===
Quartered arms of Matthew Stewart, 4th Earl of Lennox, displaying an inescutcheon of Lennox

- John Stewart, 1st Earl of Lennox (d. 1495);
- Matthew Stewart, 2nd Earl of Lennox (1488–1513), killed at the Battle of Flodden;
- John Stewart, 3rd Earl of Lennox (d. 1526);
- Matthew Stewart, 4th Earl of Lennox (1516–1571);
  - Henry Stewart, Lord Darnley (1545–1567), eldest son and heir apparent to the earldom who predeceased his father. He married his half-first cousin Mary, Queen of Scots, daughter and heiress of King James V of Scotland, by whom he was the father of King James VI of Scotland and I of England (lived 1566–1625), who inherited the earldom on the death of his grandfather the 4th Earl, whereupon it merged with the Crown, but was re-created by the king for his uncle.

=== Earls of Lennox, third creation (c. 1571) ===
- Charles Stewart, Earl of Lennox (1555–1576), second son of the 4th Earl of the second creation.

=== Earls of Lennox, fourth creation (1578) ===
- Robert Stewart, Earl of Lennox, "exchanged" for the Earldom of March in 1580, second son of the third Earl of the second creation.

=== Earls of Lennox, fifth creation (1580) ===
- Esmé Stewart, Earl of Lennox (1542–1583), grandson of the third Earl of the second creation through his third son John.

=== Dukes of Lennox, first creation (1581) ===
- Esmé Stewart, Duke of Lennox (1542–1583)
- Ludovic Stewart, Duke of Lennox and Richmond (1574–1623)
- Esmé Stewart, Duke of Lennox (1579–1624)
- James Stewart, Duke of Lennox and Richmond (1612–1655)
- Esmé Stewart, Duke of Lennox and Richmond (1649–1660)
- Charles Stewart, Duke of Lennox and Richmond (1639–1672) (extinct)

=== Dukes of Lennox, second creation (1675) ===
- Charles Lennox, Duke of Lennox and Richmond (1672–1723)
- Charles Lennox, Duke of Lennox and Richmond (1701–1750)
- Charles Lennox, Duke of Lennox and Richmond (1736–1806)
- Charles Lennox, Duke of Lennox and Richmond (1764–1819)
- Charles Gordon-Lennox, Duke of Lennox and Richmond (1791–1860)
- Charles Gordon-Lennox, Duke of Lennox, Richmond and Gordon (1818–1903)
- Charles Gordon-Lennox, Duke of Lennox, Richmond and Gordon (1845–1928)
- Charles Gordon-Lennox, Duke of Lennox, Richmond and Gordon (1870–1935)
- Frederick Gordon-Lennox, Duke of Lennox, Richmond and Gordon (1904–1989)
- Charles Gordon-Lennox, Duke of Lennox, Richmond and Gordon (1929–2017)
- Charles Gordon-Lennox, Duke of Lennox, Richmond and Gordon (b. 1955)

== Stewart family ==
Arms of Stewart, Dukes of Richmond and Lennox and Seigneurs d'Aubigny: Quarterly of 4, 1&4: Royal arms of King Charles VII of France within a bordure gules charged with eight buckles or; 2&3: Stewart of Darnley within a bordure engrailed gules for difference; overall an inescutcheon of Lennox

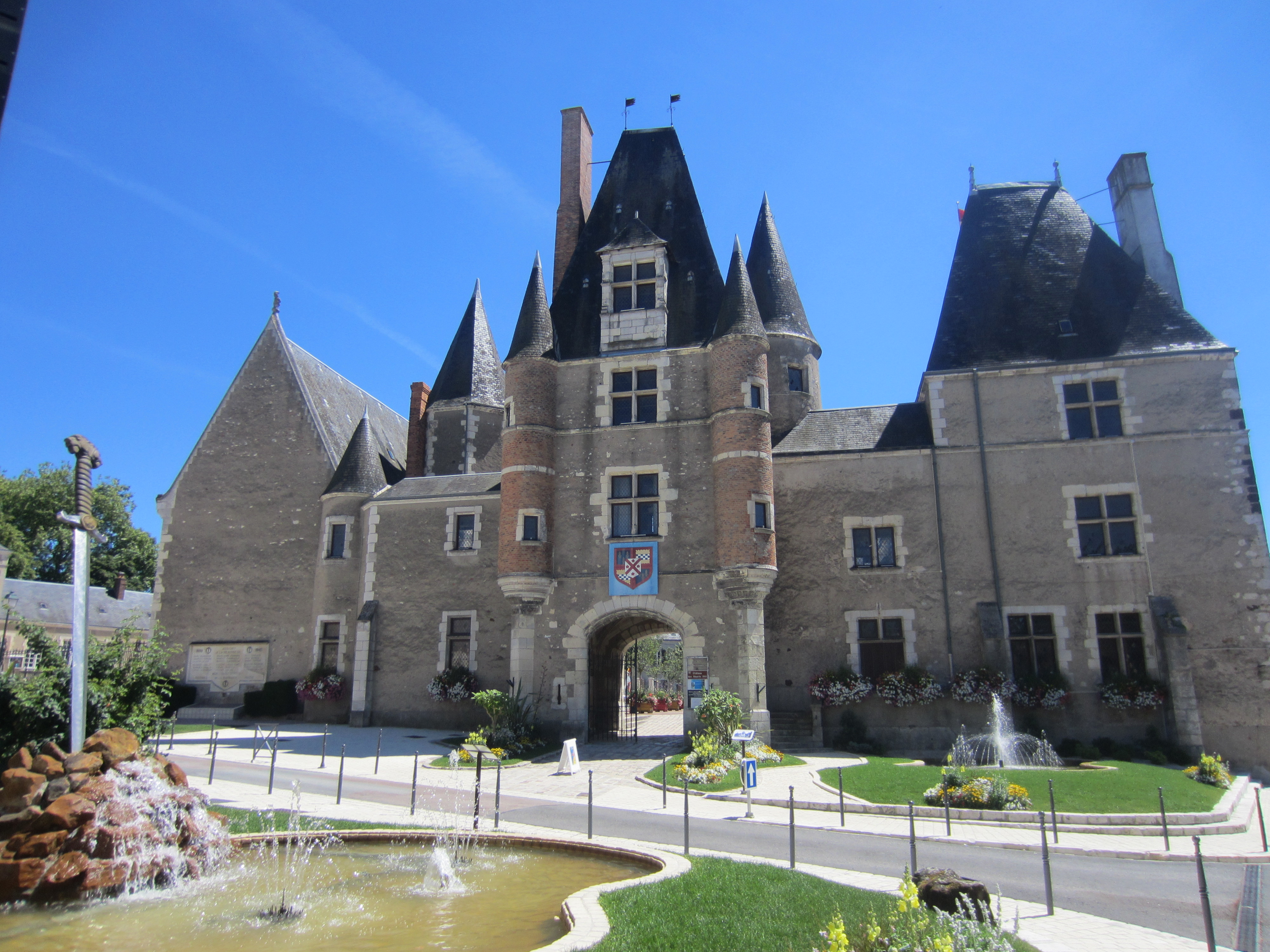
The Château d'Aubigny-sur-Nère, paternal home of Esmé Stewart, 1st Duke of Lennox, 1st Earl of Lennox. Built by Sir Robert Stewart, 4th Seigneur d'Aubigny (c. 1470 – 1544) and known to the French today as le château des Stuarts

=== Ludovic Stewart, 1st Duke of Richmond, 2nd Duke of Lennox ===
Ludovic Stewart, 1st Duke of Richmond, 2nd Duke of Lennox (1574–1624), was the eldest son and heir of Esmé Stewart, 1st Duke of Lennox, 1st Earl of Lennox (1542–1583), a Roman Catholic French nobleman of Scottish ancestry who on his move to Scotland at the age of 37 became a favorite of the 13-year-old King James VI of Scotland (later James I of England), of whose father, Henry Stewart, Lord Darnley, he was a first cousin. In 1579/80 Esmé Stewart was created Earl of Lennox, Lord Darnley, Aubigny and Dalkeith and in 1581 he was created Duke of Lennox, Earl of Darnley, Lord Aubigny, Dalkeith, Torboltoun and Aberdour.

The founder of the French branch of the Stewart family of Darnley in Renfrewshire, Scotland, was Sir John Stewart of Darnley (c. 1380 – 1429), 1st Seigneur de Concressault, 1st Seigneur d'Aubigny, 1st Comte d'Évreux, a warrior who commanded the Scottish army in France assisting the French King Charles VII to expel the invading English forces under King Henry V during the Hundred Years War. He was much appreciated by the French king who showered him with honours and landed estates and granted him the "glorious privilege of quartering the royal arms of France with his paternal arms". The residence of the Stewart family in France was the Château d'Aubigny, Aubigny-sur-Nère, in the ancient county of Berry.

King James I regarded all Esmé's family with great affection, and instructed his son King Charles I to do well by them. Charles faithfully fulfilled this obligation, and as a result the Lennox family had considerable influence at the Scottish and English Courts over the next two generations. In 1603 as well as being granted the reversion of Cobham Hall, he was also granted the possession of Temple Newsam Hall in Yorkshire, the birthplace of Henry Stewart, Lord Darnley, father of King James I and first cousin of Ludovic's father. In 1613 Ludovic Stewart was created Baron of Settrington (of Yorkshire) and Earl of Richmond (of Yorkshire) and in 1623 Earl of Newcastle-Upon-Tyne and Duke of Richmond. He married three times but died on 16 February 1623/4, aged 50, without legitimate issue, when all his titles, excepting those inherited from his father, became extinct. He was buried in Westminster Abbey, in the Richmond Vault in the Henry VII Chapel (that king formerly having been Earl of Richmond) above which survives his magnificent black marble monument by Hubert Le Sueur with gilt-bronze recumbent effigies of himself and his wife.

=== Esmé Stewart, 3rd Duke of Lennox ===
Esmé Stewart, 3rd Duke of Lennox (1579–1624), younger brother and heir, who had succeeded his father as 7th Seigneur d'Aubigny (which French title was able to be passed directly to a younger son). He died on 30 July 1624 of spotted fever, just 5 months after his elder brother. He married Katherine Clifton, 2nd Baroness Clifton (c. 1592 – 1637) of Leighton Bromswold, Huntingdonshire, as a consequence of which in 1619 he was created Baron Stuart of Leighton Bromswold and Earl of March. He was buried in Westminster Abbey.

=== James Stewart, 1st Duke of Richmond, 4th Duke of Lennox ===
James Stewart, 1st Duke of Richmond, 4th Duke of Lennox (1612–1655), son and heir, a third cousin of King Charles I. In 1624 King James I created the 12-year-old newly-fatherless James Stewart as Duke of Richmond and in 1628, following the death of Frances Howard (Lady Cobham), he gained vacant possession of Cobham Hall, which became his main residence. He was a key member of Royalist party in the English Civil War and in 1641–42 he served as Lord Warden of the Cinque Ports, which office was administered from nearby Dover Castle in Kent. He married Mary Villiers, daughter of George Villiers, 1st Duke of Buckingham.

=== Esmé Stuart, 2nd Duke of Richmond, 5th Duke of Lennox ===
Esmé Stuart, 2nd Duke of Richmond, 5th Duke of Lennox (1649–1660) was the infant son the 1st Duke. On his father's death when he was aged 6, and following the defeat of the royalist faction in the Civil War, he and his mother went into exile in France, where he died of the smallpox aged 10 in 1660 (the year of the Restoration of the Monarchy), when his titles passed to his first cousin Charles Stewart, 3rd Duke of Richmond, 6th Duke of Lennox. He was buried in Westminster Abbey, where survives his monument, a black obelisk surmounted by an urn containing his heart.

=== Charles Stewart, 3rd Duke of Richmond, 6th Duke of Lennox ===
Charles Stewart, 3rd Duke of Richmond, 6th Duke of Lennox (1639–1672) was the only son of George Stewart, 9th Seigneur d'Aubigny (1618–1642) (a younger brother of the 1st & 4th Duke), by his wife Katherine Howard, a daughter of Theophilus Howard, 2nd Earl of Suffolk. He was appointed joint Lord Lieutenant of Kent and Vice-Admiral of Kent. With the Civil War over and the Stuart monarchy restored, he re-built the central block at Cobham Hall, between 1662 and 1672, to the design of the architect Peter Mills. His "Gilt Hall" of 1672 (with marble wall decorations added in the 18th c. by James Wyatt) was considered by King George IV to be the finest room in England. He married three times but died childless.

== Family tree ==
Lennox, Richmond, and Gordon family tree including peerages of Aboyne, Aubigny, Enzie, Gordon, Huntly, Inverness, Kinrara, Lennox, March, Meldrum, Richmond, Settrington, and Strathaven, Balmore, Auchindoun, Garthie and Kincardine

Henry of Scotland; 1114–1152; Earl of Northumbria, Earl of Huntingdon
Mormaer of Lennox (1st creation), 12th century
Malcolm IV; 1141–1165; Earl of Huntingdon, later King of Scotland	William I c. 1142–1214; Earl of Huntingdon, later King of Scotland	David; 1152–1219; Mormaer of Lennox, Earl of Huntingdon	Ailín I d. c. 1200 possibly Mormaer of Lennox
Isobel of Huntingdon; 1199–1251	Ailín II d. 1217; Mormaer of Lennox
Robert V de Brus c. 1210–1295	Maol Domhnaich (Maldoven) d. 1250; Mormaer of Lennox	?	Gille Chriosd	Alexander Stewart c. 1214–1283; High Steward of Scotland
Robert VI de Brus; 1243–1304	Maol Choluim (Malcolm) I d. 1303; Mormaer of Lennox	Amlaibh	Clan MacFarlane	John Stewart d. 1298
Robert I 1274–1329; King of Scotland	Maol Choluim (Malcolm) II d. 1333; Mormaer of Lennox	?
Marjorie Bruce; 1296–1316	Domhnall (Donald) d. 1365; Mormaer of Lennox	?	Alan Stewart of Dreghorn d. 1333
Edward III; 1312–1377; King of England	Robert II; 1316–1390; King of Scotland	Margaret; Countess of Lennox (?)	Walter of Faslane (also Baltar mac Amlaimh) de facto Mormaer of Lennox	Alexander Stewart of Darnley d. 1374
Resigned, 1385
Earl of Richmond (5th creation), 1342
John of Gaunt; 1340–1399; Duke of Lancaster; Earl of Richmond	Adam de Gordon d. 1402; Lord of Gordon	Robert III; 1337–1406; King of Scots	Robert Stewart c. 1340–1420; Duke of Albany	Donnchadh; Mormaer of Lennox r. 1385–1425	Alexander Stewart of Darnley d. 1404
Earldom of Richmond (5th creation) surrendered, 1372
Lord of (Seigneur d')Aubigny, 1422
Henry IV; 1367–1413; King of England	John Beaufort; 1373–1410; Earl of Somerset	Elizabeth Gordon d. 1439 m. Alexander Seton d. 1440 or 1441; Lord Gordon	Murdoch Stewart; 1362-1425; Duke of Albany	Isabella d. 1458; Countess of Lennox	Elizabeth	John Stewart of Darnley c. 1380–1429; 1st Comte d'Évreux, Seigneur de Concressault, 1st Lord of Aubigny
Earldom of Lennox (1st creation) extinct, 1458
Earl of Richmond (6th creation), 1414	Earl of Huntly, 1445
John of Lancaster; 1389–1435; Duke of Bedford, Earl of Richmond	John Beaufort c. 1403–1444; Duke of Somerset	Alexander Seton (Gordon) d. 1470; 1st Earl of Huntly	James I 1394–1437; King of Scots	Joan Beaufort c. 1404–1445	James Stewart c. 1399 – c. 1451; Black Knight of Lorn	Alan Stewart of Darnley after 1406 – 1439	John Stewart d. 1482; 2nd Lord of Aubigny
Earldom of Richmond (6th creation) extinct, 1435
Earl of Richmond (7th creation), 1452	Earl of Lennox (2nd creation), 1488
Edmund Tudor; 1430–1456; 1st Earl of Richmond	Margaret Beaufort; 1443–1509	George Gordon d. 1501; 2nd Earl of Huntly	Annabella of Scotland c. 1433–1509	James II; 1430–1460; King of Scots	John Stewart a. 1430–1495; 1st Earl of Lennox	John Stewart c. 1440–1512; Earl of Atholl	Bernard Stewart c. 1452 – 1508; 3rd Lord of Aubigny
Henry Tudor; 1457–1509; 2nd Earl of Richmond, Later King Henry VII	James III; 1451–1488; King of Scots	Mary Stewart; 1453–1488
Earldom of Richmond (7th creation) merged into the Crown, 1509
Elizabeth Stewart d. after 1531	Matthew Stewart; 1460–1513; 2nd Earl of Lennox	Robert Stewart c. 1470–1544; 4th Lord of Aubigny	Anne
Henry VIII; 1491–1547; King of England	Alexander Gordon d. 1524; 3rd Earl of Huntly	James IV; 1473–1513; King of Scots	Margaret Tudor; 1489–1541	Archibald Douglas; 1489–1557; Earl of Angus	John Stewart c. 1490–1526; 3rd Earl of Lennox	Elizabeth Stewart
John Gordon d. 1517; Lord Gordon	Margaret Stewart b. 1498)
Earl of Lennox (4th creation), 1578
Duke of Richmond and Somerset, 1525	Earl of March (3rd Scottish creation), 1581
Henry Fitzroy; 1519–1536; Duke of Richmond and Somerset	George Gordon; 1514–1562; 4th Earl of Huntly	James V 1512–1542; King of Scots	Margaret Douglas; 1515–1578	Matthew Stewart; 1516–1571; 4th Earl of Lennox	Robert Stewart c. 1522–1586; Earl of Lennox, Earl of March	John Stewart d. 1567; 5th Lord of Aubigny
Dukedom of Richmond and Somerset extinct, 1536	Earldom of Lennox (2nd creation) merged with crown, 1571	Earldom of Lennox (4th creation) "exchanged" for the Earldom of March, 1580
Earl of Lennox (3rd creation), c. 1571	Earl of Lennox (5th creation), 1580; Duke of Lennox (1st creation), 1581
George Gordon d. 1576; 5th Earl of Huntly	Mary; 1542–1587; Queen of Scots	Henry Stuart; 1545–1567; Lord Darnley	Charles Stuart; 1557–1576; Earl of Lennox	Esmé Stewart; 1542–1583; Duke of Lennox, etc., 6th Lord of Aubigny
Earldom of Lennox (3rd creation) extinct, 1576
Earl of Richmond, Baron Settrington (1st creation), 1613
Marquess of Huntly, Earl of Enzie, and Lord Gordon of Badenoch, 1599	Duke of Richmond (1st creation), 1623	Earl of March (3rd English creation), 1619
George Gordon; 1562–1636; 1st Marquess of Huntly, etc., 6th Earl of Huntly	James VI and I 1566–1625; King of England and Scotland	Ludovic Stewart; 1574–1623; 2nd Duke of Lennox, 1st Duke of Richmond, etc.	Esmé Stewart; 1579–1624; 3rd Duke of Lennox, 2nd Earl of Richmond, 3rd Baron Settrington, 1st Earl of March, 7th Lord of Aubigny
Dukedom of Richmond, Earldom of Richmond and Settrington Barony extinct, 1623
Viscount Aboyne, 1632	Duke of Richmond (2nd creation), 1641
George Gordon c. 1592–1649; 2nd Marquess of Huntly, etc., 7th Earl of Huntly, 1st Viscount Aboyne	Charles I 1600–1649; King of England and Scotland	James Stewart; 1612–1655; 4th Duke of Lennox, 1st Duke of Richmond, 2nd Earl of March	Henry Stewart; 1616–1632; 8th Lord of Aubigny	George Stewart; 1618–1642; 9th Lord of Aubigny	Ludovic Stewart; 1619–1665; 10th Lord of Aubigny
Duke of Aubigny (France), 1684	Earl of Aboyne and Lord Gordon of Strathaven and Glenlivet, 1660
James Gordon c. 1620–1649; 2nd Viscount Aboyne	Lewis Gordon c. 1626–1653; 3rd Marquess of Huntly, etc., 8th Earl of Huntly	Charles II; 1630–1685; King of England and Scotland	Louise de Kérousaille; 1649–1734; Duchess of Portsmouth, Duchess of Aubigny	Charles Gordon c. 1638–1681; 1st Earl of Aboyne, etc.	Esmé Stewart; 1649–1660; 5th Duke of Lennox, 2nd Duke of Richmond, 3rd Earl of March	Charles Stewart; 1639–1672; 6th Duke of Lennox, 3rd Duke of Richmond, 4th Earl of March, 11th Lord of Aubigny
Aboyne Viscountcy extinct, 1649	Dukedoms of Lennox and Richmond, earl of March (3rd English creation), and lordship of Aubigny extinct, 1672
Duke of Gordon (1st creation), Viscount of Inverness, and Lord Strathaven, Balmore, Auchindoun, Garthie and Kincardine, 1684	Duke of Richmond (3rd creation), Duke of Lennox (2nd creation), Earl of March (4th English creation), Earl of Darnley, Baron Settrington of Settrington in the County of York (2nd creation), and Lord Torbolton, 1675
George Gordon; 1st Duke of Gordon, etc., 4th Marquess of Huntly, etc., 9th Earl of Huntly	Charles Lennox; 1672–1723; 1st Duke of Richmond and Duke of Lennox, etc., Duke of Aubigny	Charles Gordon c. 1670–1702; 2nd Earl of Aboyne, etc.
Alexander Gordon; 1720–1752; 2nd Duke of Gordon, etc., 5th Marquess of Huntly, etc., 10th Earl of Huntly	Charles Lennox; 1701–1750; 2nd Duke of Richmond and Duke of Lennox, etc., Duke of Aubigny	John Gordon d. 1732; 3rd Earl of Aboyne, etc.
Cosmo George Gordon; 1720–1752; 3rd Duke of Gordon, etc., 6th Marquess of Huntly, etc., 11th Earl of Huntly	Charles Lennox; 1735–1806; 3rd Duke of Richmond and Duke of Lennox, etc., Duke of Aubigny	George Lennox; 1737–1805	Charles Gordon c. 1726–1794; 4th Earl of Aboyne, etc.
Baron Gordon of Huntly, 1784
Alexander Gordon; 1743–1827; 4th Duke of Gordon, etc., 7th Marquess of Huntly, etc., 12th Earl of Huntly, 1st Earl of Norwich, 1st Baron Gordon of Huntly
Baron Meldrum of Morven in the County of Aberdeen, 1815; Marquess of Huntly reverted, 1838
George Duncan Gordon; 1770–1836; 5th Duke of Gordon, etc., 8th Marquess of Huntly, etc., 13th Earl of Huntly, 5th Earl of Enzie, 2nd Earl of Norwich, 2nd Baron Gordon of Huntly	Lady Charlotte Gordon; 1768–1842	Charles Lennox; 1764–1819; 4th Duke of Richmond and Duke of Lennox, etc., Duke of Aubigny, etc.	George Gordon; 1761–1853; 9th Marquess of Huntly, 14th Earl of Huntly, 5th Earl of Aboyne, etc., 1st Baron Meldrum
Dukedom of Gordon (1st creation), earldom of Norwich (4th creation), earldom of Enzie, viscountcy of Inverness, lordship Strathaven, Balmore, Auchindoun, Garthie and Kincardine, barony Gordon of Huntly extinct, 1836; Marquessate and earldom of Huntly continued with George Gordon, 5th Earl of Aboyne
Charles Gordon-Lennox; 1791–1860; 5th Duke of Richmond and Duke of Lennox, etc., Duke of Aubigny, etc.	Charles Gordon; 1792–1863; 10th Marquess of Huntly, 15th Earl of Huntly, 6th Earl of Aboyne, etc., 2nd Baron Meldrum
Duke of Gordon (2nd creation) and Earl of Kinrara, 1876
Charles Henry Gordon-Lennox; 1818–1903; 6th Duke of Richmond and Duke of Lennox, 1st Duke of Gordon, etc., 6th Duke of Aubigny, etc.
Charles Henry Gordon-Lennox; 1845–1928; 7th Duke of Richmond and Duke of Lennox, 2nd Duke of Gordon, etc., 7th Duke of Aubigny, etc.	Charles Gordon; 1847–1937; 11th Marquess of Huntly, 16th Earl of Huntly, 7th Earl of Aboyne, etc., 3rd Baron Meldrum	Granville Armyne Gordon; 1856–1907
Charles Henry Gordon-Lennox; 1870–1935; 8th Duke of Richmond and Duke of Lennox, 8th Duke of Aubigny, etc. 3rd Duke of Gordon, etc.	Granville Cecil Douglas Gordon; 1883–1930
Charles Henry Gordon-Lennox; 1899–1919; Lord Settrington	Frederick Charles Gordon-Lennox; 1904–1989; 9th Duke of Richmond and Duke of Lennox, 9th Duke of Aubigny, etc., 4th Duke of Gordon, etc.	Douglas Charles Lindsey Gordon; 1908–1987; 12th Marquess of Huntly, 18th Earl of Huntly, 8th Earl of Aboyne, etc., 4th Baron Meldrum
Charles Henry Gordon-Lennox; 1929–2017; 10th Duke of Richmond and Duke of Lennox, 10th Duke of Aubigny, etc., 5th Duke of Gordon, etc.
Charles Gordon-Lennox b. 1955; 11th Duke of Richmond and Duke of Lennox, 11th Duke of Aubigny, etc., 6th Duke of Gordon, etc.	Granville Charles Gomer Gordon b. 1944; 13th Marquess of Huntly, 18th Earl of Huntly, 9th Earl of Aboyne, etc., 5th Baron Meldrum
Charles Henry Gordon-Lennox b. 1994 styled Earl of March and Kinrara	Alastair Gordon b. 1973 styled Earl of Aboyne
Heir apparent to the dukedoms of Richmond, Lennox, Aubigny, and Gordon	Heir apparent to the marquessate of Huntly

== See also ==
- Duke of Lennox
- Seigneur d'Aubigny
- Earl of Richmond
