= Clan MacFarlane =

Highland Scottish clan

- Clann Phàrlain
- Motto: This I'll defend
- War cry: Loch Slòigh ("The Loch of the Host")

Profile
- Region: Highland
- District: Argyll
- Pipe music: The MacFarlane's Gathering, Thogail nam Bó
- Clan MacFarlane no longer has a chief, and is an armigerous clan
- Chief (Mac a' Bhàirling or MacPhàrlain)
- Historic seat: Arrochar
- Last Chief: William MacFarlane, 20th Clan Chief
- Died: 1866
Septs of Clan MacFarlane
MacFarlane, Macfarlane, MacFarland, McFarlane, Mcfarlane, McFarland, McFarlin
Allied clans
Clan Campbell
Clan MacGregor
Clan MacDonald of Keppoch
Rival clans
Clan Colquhoun
Clan MacLaren

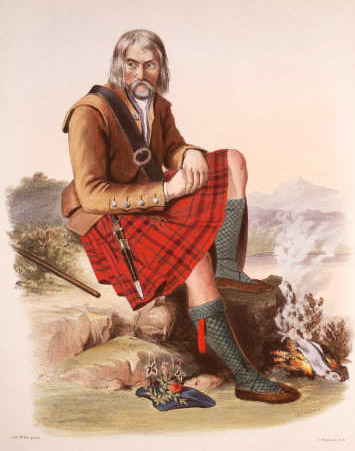
A Victorian era, romanticised depiction of a member of the clan by R. R. McIan, from The Clans of the Scottish Highlands, published in 1845.

Clan MacFarlane (Scottish Gaelic: Clann Phàrlain [ˈkʰl̪ˠãũn̪ˠ ˈfaːrˠl̪ˠɛn]) is a Highland Scottish clan. Descended from the medieval Earls of Lennox, the MacFarlanes occupied the land forming the western shore of Loch Lomond from Tarbet up-wards. From Loch Sloy, a small sheet of water near the foot of Ben Vorlich, they took their war cry of Loch Slòigh.

The clan was noted for the nighttime cattle raiding of neighbouring clan lands, particularly those of Clan Colquhoun, and as such a full moon became known locally as "MacFarlane's Lantern". The ancestral lands of the clan were held by the chiefs until they were sold off for debts, in 1767. Since 1866 the chiefship has been dormant, no one having claimed or obtained rematriculation of the Chief Arms, making Clan MacFarlane a supposed armigerous clan.

== History ==
=== Origins ===
Clan MacFarlane claims descent from the original Earls of Lennox, though the ultimate origin of these earls is murky and has been debated. The nineteenth-century Scottish antiquary George Chalmers, in his Caledonia, quoting the twelfth century English chronicler Symeon of Durham, wrote that the original Earls of Lennox descended from an Anglo-Saxon – Arkil, son of Egfrith. This Arkil, a Northumbrian chief, was said to have fled to Scotland from the devastation caused by the Harrying of the North by William the Conqueror, and later received control of the Lennox district from Malcolm III of Scotland, though alternative theories state that the original Earls of Lennox may have been of Gaelic descent. These two views are not mutually exclusive, as what is now southern Scotland and northern England had, in the post-Roman and early Mediaeval era, been a flux of Gaelic, Brittonic, Scandinavian and Germanic ethnicities.

Clan MacFarlane claims its descent from the original line of the Earls of Lennox, through Gille Chriosd, brother of Maol Domhnaich, Earl of Lennox, who received in charter, "de terris de superiori Arrochar de Luss", the lands of Arrochar which the MacFarlanes held for centuries until the death of the last chief. Gille Chriosd's son, Donnchadh, also obtained charters for his lands from the Earl of Lennox, and appears in the Ragman Rolls as "Dunkan Makilcrift de Leuenaghes" (Duncan son of Gilchrist of Lennox). Donnchadh's grandson was Parlan (or Bartholomew), from whom the clan takes its name from. There is no contemporary evidence of this Parlan or his elided father, only centuries-retrospective assertions that private documentation existed at the time of the Macfarlane attempt to claim the defunct earldom of Lennox. Maolchaluim Mac Pharlain, the son of Parlan, was confirmed the lands of Arrochar and others, and "hence Maolchaluim may be considered as the real founder of the clan". Maolchaluim, in turn, was succeeded by his son, Donnchadh, who obtained by charter the lands of Arrochar, dated in 1395 at Inchmurrin. Donnchadh seems to have married Christian, daughter of Sir Colin Campbell of Loch Awe, as stated in a charter of confirmation by Donnchadh, Earl of Lennox, also dated in 1395. Iain Mac Pharlain, in 1420, received confirmation to his lands of Arrochar.

==== In support of the Stewart earls of Lennox ====
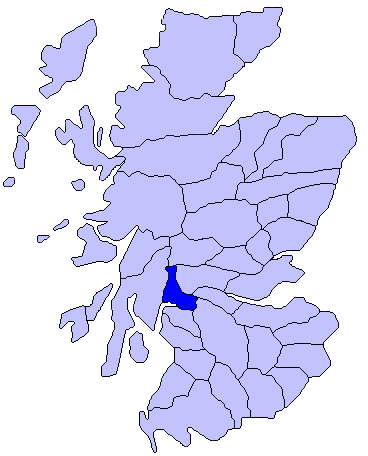
Map of the district of Lennox.

Not long after, the ancient line of the Earls of Lennox died with the execution of Donnchadh, Earl of Lennox, by James I of Scotland in 1425. After the earl's death it seems that the MacFarlanes claimed the earldom as heirs male. This claim, though, proved disastrous and the family of the chief were murdered, with the clan's fortunes reduced severely. The destruction of the MacFarlanes would have been inevitable but for an Anndra MacFarlane, who married Barbara, daughter of John Stewart, Lord Darnley, who had been created Earl of Lennox in 1488. Skene claimed that even though Anndra Mac Pharlain, through his marriage, had saved the clan from destruction, he still was refused the chiefship of the clan. Skene also showed that even his son, Sir John MacFarlane, assumed the subordinate designation of "Capitaneus de Clan Pharlane" (Captain of the clan). Though Alexander MacBain, in a later edition of Skene's work, pointed out that Capitaneus was really Latin for Chief. From this period on the clan appears to have loyally supported the Stewart Earls of Lennox, and for several generations there is little history attributed to the clan.

===== Battle of Glasgow Muir =====
In the mid sixteenth century, Donnchadh Mac Pharlain of Mac Pharlain, appears to have been a steady supporter of Matthew Stewart, 4th Earl of Lennox. In 1544, Mac Pharlain led three hundred of his men, and joined Lennox and Glencairn at the Battle of Glasgow Muir, where they were narrowly defeated. The Mac Pharlains were affected by the forfeitures that followed, though were saved by their very powerful friends, and the chief obtained a remission for his lands. After the defeat, the Earl of Lennox was forced to flee to England, and married a niece of Henry VIII, and afterward returned to Scotland with a huge force supplied by the English king. For fear of further repercussions, the chief of the clan did not personally support Lennox, but instead sent a relative, Bhaltar MacFarlane of Tarbet, with four hundred men, in support of the Earl. The MacFarlane clansmen are said to have acted as light troops, and as guides to the Earl's main force. The sixteenth century, English chronicler, Raphael Holinshed described this MacFarlane force as follows: "In these exploytes the Erle had with him Walter McFarlane of Tarbet, and seven score of men of the head of Lennox, that spoke both Irishe and the English Scottish tongues very well, light footmen very well armed in the shirtes of mayle, with bows and two-handed swords; and being joined with the Scottish archers and shotte, did much avayleable service in the streyghts, marishes, and mountayne countries".

===== Battle of Pinkie Cleugh =====
At Irwine in 1545, a bond of manrent was granted to Hugh, Master of Eglinton to Duncan, uncle of the Laird of MacFarlane. Later in 1547 the clan suffered grievously at the Battle of Pinkie Cleugh, in which the chief, Duncan was slain along with many of his men. The clan, led by Duncan's son, Andrew, fought under the Regent James Stewart, 1st Earl of Moray, against the forces of Mary, Queen of Scots, at the Battle of Langside in 1568. The clan's part in the battle is related to by Holinshed: "In this battayle the vaiancie of an Hie-land gentle-man named M'Farlane, stood the Regent's part in great steede; for in the hottest brunte of the fight, he came in with three hundred of his friends and countrymen, and so manfully gave in upon the flanke of the queen's people, that there was great cause of the disordering of them". After the battle, the clan also boasted of capturing three standards of the Queen's army, which were preserved as trophies for a long time afterwards. For his clan's aid, Andrew was awarded the crest of a "demi-savage proper, holding in his dexter hand a sheaf of arrows, and pointing with his sinister to an imperial crown, or, with the motto, This I'll defend", by the Earl. The crest bestowed on the MacFarlane chief alludes to the defence of the Crown and Kingdom of Scotland, as Mary was seen as rebellion against the Crown.

Nothing is known of Andrew's son, though his grandson, Walter MacFarlane was a staunch supporter of the King. In his time, he was twice besieged in his house, and his castle of Inveruglas was later burned down by English forces.

Arms of the last chief of MacFarlane

==== Fall of the clan ====
The clan was denounced by the Government in 1594, to have committing theft, robbery, murder, and tyranny. Later, in 1624, after the Battle of Glen Fruin when the MacFarlanes and their friends the MacGregors killed about 80 members of Clan Colquhoun and their allies, several members of the clan were tried and convicted of such acts, with some being pardoned and others executed. Many others were removed to Aberdeenshire and Strathaven in Banffshire, where they assumed the names M'Caudy, Greisock, M'James and M'Innes. Some to fled to Ireland, and with the famine there and emigrated further to Jamaica where the surname would evolve to McFarlane.

The last clan chief, in the direct male line, William Macfarlane, 20th Clan Chief, was born in 1813 and died without issue in 1866. The heir of line then passed to his sister, Jane Watt MacFarlane, who was born in 1817 and who married a Mr James Scott and settled in Sunderland, England. A successful draper, she died in 1887 leaving several children. A current clan chief could be found from one of their descendants.

Several of the clan left and settled in Ireland, as part of the force of their superior the Earl of Lennox when he took up his 3000-acre landholding during the plantation (resettlement) of Ireland in the reign of James VI, and the leading representative of this branch, McFarland of Hunstown House, from Dublin, made claims (unsuccessful) to the chiefship of the clan. Today the chiefship of the clan is dormant, and the clan can be considered an Armigerous clan.

== Clan profile ==
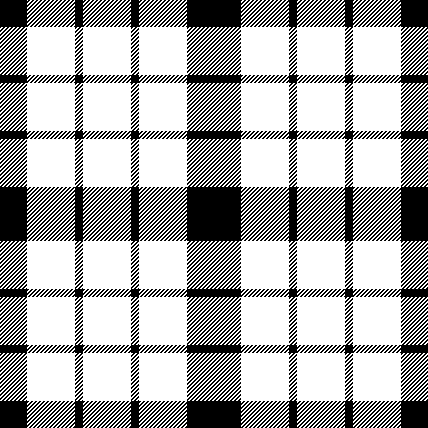
MacFarlane tartan as published in the dubious Vestiarium Scoticum.

- Clan Badge: Two plant badges have been attributed to the clan.
  - Cranberry. The clan shares this badge with Clan MacAulay, which tradition gives a descent from the old Earls of Lennox.
  - Cloudberry. (Attributed to the clan by Skene).
- Clan Slogan: Loch Sloidh (Anglicised as: Loch Sloy) (translated from Gaelic: The Loch of the Host).
- Clan Motto: This I'll Defend.
- Clan Crest: A demi-savage brandishing in his dexter a broad sword Proper and pointing with his sinister to an Imperial Crown or standing by him on the wreath.
- Clan Pipe Music (Pibroch):
  - 'Thogail nam bo theid sinn (translation from Gaelic: Lifting the cattle). or, Thogail nam Bo theid sinn (translation: To Lift the cows by the light of the moon).
  - Spaidsearachd Chlann Pharlain (translation from Gaelic: MacFarlane's march).
  - Saved from extinction by Robert Macfarlan in the late 1800s.
- Clan Tartan: There are six reported MacFarlane tartans: Red (Modern, Ancient, Weathered); Hunting (Modern, Ancient, Weathered); Black & White / Mourning (Modern, Ancient), Black & Red; Dress; and Lendrum.

=== Origin of the name ===
The surname MacFarlane, and other variations of the name, are Anglicisations of the Gaelic patronymic Mac Pharlain, meaning "son of Parlan". The Gaelic Parlan or Parthalán is likely a Gaelicisation of the Latin Bartholomaeus. In Moncreiffe's opinion the name was linked with Partholón of Irish mythology, writing: "Par-tholon or 'Sea-Waves' appears in Irish mythology as the first to take possession of Ireland after the flood".

=== Associated names ===
The following names are considered, by the International Clan MacFarlane Society, to be associated with the clan. Note that the prefixes Mac, Mc, and M' are interchangeable. Many of the associated names listed are claimed by other clans.

Associated names of Clan MacFarlane

- Condey / Condie / Condy.
- Gruamach.
- MacCondey / MacCondie / MacCondy.
- MacIock / MacJock.
- MacInally.
- MacNide / MacNite.
- MacNoyer / MacNuyer.
- MacWalter.

MacFarlaine

- Monach / Monnock.
- Parlane
- Parlin
- Weaver.
- Webster.
- Weir.

Associated names of Clan MacFarlane that are also claimed by other clans

- Allan / Allen.
- Allanach.
- Allanson.
- Allison.
- Arrell / Arroll.
- Barclay.
- Bart.
- Bartholomew.
- Bartie/y.
- Bartson.
- Brice / Bryce.
- Caa / Caw.
- Calla/ende/ar.
- Cunnison / Kennison.
- Galbraith.
- Galloway.
- Grassick / Griesk.
- Greusaich.
- Knox.
- Lea/iper.
- Lenox / Lennox.
- MacAllan / MacAllen.
- MacAndrew.
- MacAndro.
- MacCaa / MacCaw.
- MacCause.
- MacEa/och.
- MacEachern.
- MacEoin.
- MacErrachar.
- MacFarquhar.
- MacGaw.
- MacGreusich/k.
- MacInstalker.
- MacJames.
- MacKin(d)la/ey.
- MacNair / MacNayer.
- MacRob / MacRobb.
- MacWilliam.
- Michie.
- Millar / Miller.
- Rob / Robb.
- Spruell (and assoc. spellings).
- Stalker.
- Williamson.
- Wilson
- Wylie / Wyllie.

== See also ==
- Armigerous clan
- Scottish clan
- Earl of Lennox
