= Ailín II, Earl of Lennox =

Scots earl (died 1217)

Mormaer Ailín II of Lennox (also known as Ailean or Alwyn) was the son of Mormaer Ailín I, and ruled Lennox from somewhere in the beginning of the 13th century until his death in 1217.

Unlike many other Scottish Mormaers, he played little role in the wider society of the Scottish kingdom. Lennox at the time was a frontier region between the Scottish Gaelic lands of central Scotland and the Norse Gaelic lands of Argyll, and the Mormaerdom seems to have lacked the status accorded to the other Mormaerdoms. Either because of this lack of status, or because of the lack of interest in national affairs, Ailin's attendance was not recorded at the coronation of King Alexander II, at Scone in 1215.

Ailin was father of ten sons, one of whom founded the clan MacFarlane, while another was ancestor of Walter of Faslane, who married the heiress of the 6th earl of Lennox.

== Bibliography ==
- Neville, Cynthia J., Native Lordship in Medieval Scotland: The Earldoms of Strathearn and Lennox, c. 1140-1365, (Portland & Dublin, 2005)
- Maitland Club, Cartularium Comitatus de Levenax ab initio seculi decimi tertii usque ad annum MCCCXCVIII, (Edinburgh, 1833)

Preceded by Ailín I	Mormaer of Lennox died 1217	Succeeded by Maol Domhnaich
