= Ailín I, Earl of Lennox =

Mormaer Ailín I of Lennox, also Alún or Alwin, ruled Lennox sometime before 1178. He is an obscure figure, known only in two sources, and remains characterless. It is not certain that he was ever recognized as a Mormaer of Lennox, although one source does call him that. In the 1170s, Lennox was in the nominal possession of David, the brother of King William I. David was given the territory as a fief of the crown in 1178.

However, the land was restored to a native magnate, Ailin's son Ailín, and recognized as a Mormaer (comes). The reasons for this are unknown. Perhaps the crown had never really controlled it; or perhaps, as Neville suggests (p. 15), the frontier region of Lennox lost its importance after the defeat and death of Somhairle mac Gille Bhrigdhe. Part of the reason was undoubtedly the promotion of David to the Earldom of Huntingdon.

== See also ==
- Alwyn MacArchill, sometimes confused with Ailín I

== Bibliography ==
- Neville, Cynthia J., Native Lordship in Medieval Scotland: The Earldoms of Strathearn and Lennox, c. 1140-1365, (Portland & Dublin, 2005)

Preceded by ?	Mormaer of Lennox; Late 12th century	Succeeded by Ailín II
