= Walter of Faslane, Earl of Lennox =

Baltar mac Amlaimh, also called Walter of Faslane, was the jure uxoris Mormaer of Lennox through his wife Margaret between 1365 and 1385.

He was the great grandson of Amlaibh, the grandson of Mormaer Ailín II through the male line. He was the chief of a kin-group tracing its origins to the settlement which followed the death of Ailín II, where the ten brothers of Mormaer Maol Domhnaich were compensated with lands.

Baltar and his kin achieved the Mormaerdom because he was allowed to marry the daughter of Mormaer Domhnall, Margaret. When Domhnall died in 1365, Margaret succeeded with Baltar as de facto ruler. It had been Domhnall's intention that the marriage would eventually allow the succession of a grandson, but it seems that Baltar was intended to rule in his turn. Indeed, Baltar and Margaret had a son, Donnchad, who was probably a young man by the time Baltar and Margaret succeeded. We do not know how relations deteriorated, but it seems that Donnchadh got impatient.

In the summer of 1384, King Robert II issued two charters formally conferring the Mormaerdom on Baltar. However, a year later he and his wife Margaret resigned the Mormaerdom over to their eldest son Donnchadh. Brown (p. 215) attributes this change as a policy change of the monarchy triggered by the increased influence of John of Carrick, the future king Robert III.

However, in 1388, Baltar and Margaret were handed custody of the Mormaerdom for the remainder of their lives, with Donnchadh retaining the title. Donnchadh was confined to a stronghold in Loch Lomond, Inchmurrin castle.

== See also ==
- Faslane Castle, Shandon Castle, and St Michael's Chapel, Faslane was once the seat of Walter de Faslane.

== Bibliography ==
- Brown, Michael, "Earldom and Kindred: The Lennox and Its Earls, 1200-1458" in Steve Boardman and Alasdair Ross (eds.) The Exercise of Power in Medieval Scotland, c.1200-1500, (Dublin/Portland, 2003), pp. 201–224

Preceded by Domhnall	Mormaer of Lennox; 1365-1385	Succeeded by Donnchadh
