= Maol Choluim II, Earl of Lennox =

Mormaer of Lennox

Coat of arms of Earl of Lennox

Mormaer Maol Choluim II of Lennox (anglicised Malcolm II of Lennox) (died 19 July 1333) was mormaer (the Celtic equivalent of an earl) of Lennox from 1303 to his death.

Maol Cholium's father, Maol Choluim I embraced the cause of Robert the Bruce as early as 1292. As a result, the English king bestowed the Lennox earldom on Sir John Menteith, who was holding it in 1307 while the real earl was with King Robert in his wanderings in the Lennox country. He was allowed to succeed to the Mormaerdom only on giving homage to King Edward I of England and attending Edward's court. It was perhaps to ease this process, that his mother Marjorie became an informant of the English crown. Maol Choluim assisted Edward initially by raising men from his Mormaerdom. Nevertheless, Maol Choluim's Bruce loyalties were the same as his father Maol Choluim I's, and this was keenly displayed when he attended Robert's coronation.

He was one of the signatories of the Declaration of Arbroath in 1320.

Maol Choluim was in fact one of the most loyal followers of Bruce, and was rewarded by both Bruce and by later pro-Bruce writers such as John Barbour and John of Fordun, who wrote much praise of him. Robert even retired in Lennox country, at the settlement of Cardross. Maol Choluim died in 1333 fighting for the Bruce cause against the Anglo-Balliol alliance at Battle of Halidon Hill.

He had two known sons by an unknown wife, his successor Domhnall and Muireadhach.

== Bibliography ==
- Neville, Cynthia J., Native Lordship in Medieval Scotland: The Earldoms of Strathearn and Lennox, c. 1140-1365, (Portland & Dublin, 2005)

Preceded by Maol Choluim I	Mormaer of Lennox; 1303–1333	Succeeded by Domhnall
