= Domhnall, Earl of Lennox =

Mormaer Domhnall of Lennox ruled Lennox in the years 1333–1365. He succeeded his father Maol Choluim II.

Domhnall adhered to the cause of David II during the Second War of Scottish Independence. King David II stayed at Dumbarton on at least twelve occasions between 1341 and 1346. King David along with Malcolm Fleming and many other Scottish nobles were taken prisoner by the English at the Battle of Neville's Cross in 1346. Earl Domhnall attended the parliament at Edinburgh 26 September 1357 and with others there appointed the plenipotentiaries to negotiate the ransom of King David. The earl received a charter from King David II dated 2 May 1361 confirming an extensive grant of forestry made by Alexander III of Scotland.

Domhnall had one issue by an unknown wife of one daughter, Margaret who married a kinsman Baltar mac Amlaimh, more usually known as Walter of Faslane thus keeping the earldom in the same line.

Domhnall died between May 1361 and November 1364 when Walter of Faslane was styled Earl of Lennox.

== Bibliography ==
- Brown, Michael, "Earldom and Kindred: The Lennox and Its Earls, 1200-1458" in Steve Boardman and Alasdair Ross (eds.) The Exercise of Power in Medieval Scotland, c.1200-1500, (Dublin/Portland, 2003), pp. 201–224

Preceded by Maol Choluim II	Mormaer of Lennox; 1333–1365	Succeeded by Margaret with Baltar mac Amlaimh
