= Margaret, Countess of Lennox =

Margaret, Countess of Lennox was the daughter of Domhnall, Earl of Lennox, who died in about 1364. She married Walter de Fasselane, a cousin, who also descended from previous Earls of Lennox.

Margaret and Walter's children were:

- Donnchadh, Earl of Lennox
- Alexander
- Alan
- Walter
