= Donnchadh, Earl of Lennox =

15th-century Scottish nobleman

Donnchadh of Lennox was the Mormaer of Lennox from 1385 to 1425. He was a son of Baltar mac Amlaimh and Margaret, daughter of Domhnall, Earl of Lennox.

When Domhnall of Lennox died in 1365, Donnchadh's mother Margaret became ruler of Lennox. It had been Domhnall's intention that the marriage would eventually allow the succession of a son, i.e. Donnchadh, but it is probable that Baltar intended to rule in his turn. It is not known how relations deteriorated, but it seems that Donnchadh got impatient. In the summer of 1384, King Robert II issued two charters formally conferring the Mormaerdom on Baltar. However, a year later he and his wife Margaret resigned the Mormaerdom over to their eldest son Donnchadh, and hence Donnchadh became ruler. However, in 1388, Baltar and Margaret were handed custody of the Mormaerdom for the remainder of their lives, with Donnchadh retaining the title. Donnchadh was confined to a stronghold in Loch Lomond, Inchmurrin castle.

Donnchadh was forced to form strong ties with the great Robert Stewart, who was the second son of King Robert II by his first wife Elizabeth Mure of Rowallan, and who ruled much of Scotland. In 1392, Donnchadh met Robert at Inchmurrin and agreed to marry his daughter Isabella to Robert's son Muiredach if Robert could secure him the Mormaerdom. As Domhnall was heirless, the deal ensured that the Mormaerdom would pass to the Stewarts upon Donnchadh's death. It took much of the 1390s, but nevertheless Robert managed to secure his part of the bargain.

Donnchadh hence became a part of the Albany Stewart nexus when the Duke of Albany acted as regent during King James's imprisonment in England. Albany refused to ransom King James and tried to prevent his return. After the king's return, they challenged the crown's authority. These Stewart ties led to Donnchadh's downfall. In 1425, he raised his men of Lennox in a revolt against King James I in support of Muiredach and his son Walter and was executed at Stirling along with various of his near relations.

He was the last male ruler of his line.

The historian Steve Boardman has suggested that the 8th Earl of Lennox could be the author of the Gaelic poem attributed to Donnchadh Mór ó Leamhnacht in The Book of the Dean of Lismore.

== Marriage and issue ==
During the life of his father Baltar, Donnchadh forged ties with his Argyll neighbours, and married Helen, the daughter of Archibald Campbell of Lochawe. Countess Helen was widow of a John of the Isles, son of John of Islay.

By Helen of the Isles, Lennox had issue:

- Isabella, Countess of Lennox; married Murdach Stewart, Earl of Fife
- Elizabeth; married (c. 1406) John Stewart of Darnley, Lord of Aubigny, Concressault and Count of Évreux.
- Margaret; married (c. 25 July 1392) Robert Menteith

Earl Donnchadh also had four natural sons:

- Malcolm
- Thomas
- Donald Lennox of Balcarroch (apparently legitimated)
- William

== Bibliography ==
- Balfour Paul, Sir James, Scots Peerage IX vols. Edinburgh 1904.
- Brown, Michael, "Earldom and Kindred: The Lennox and Its Earls, 1200-1458" in Steve Boardman and Alasdair Ross (eds.) The Exercise of Power in Medieval Scotland, c.1200-1500, (Dublin/Portland, 2003), pp. 201–224

| Preceded by Margaret with Baltar mac Amlaimh | Mormaer of Lennox; 1385-1425 | Succeeded by Isabella |
