= Maol Choluim I, Earl of Lennox =

Scottish noble

Mormaer Maol Choluim I of Lennox (English: Malcolm I) ruled the Mormaerdom of Lennox, between 1250 and 1303, succeeding his father Maol Domhnaich.

He was an early supporter of the Bruces, and appeared before Edward I of England in 1292 amongst the supporters of Robert Bruce, 5th Lord of Annandale. Maol Choluim joined the revolt of Andrew de Moray and William Wallace.

Maol Choluim married a woman named Marjorie, and fathered his successor Maol Choluim II

He died in 1303.

== Bibliography ==
- Neville, Cynthia J., Native Lordship in Medieval Scotland: The Earldoms of Strathearn and Lennox, c. 1140-1365, (Portland & Dublin, 2005)

Preceded by Maol Domhnaich	Mormaer of Lennox; 1250–1303	Succeeded by Maol Choluim II
