= Maol Domhnaich, Earl of Lennox =

13th-century Scots earl

Mormaer Maol Domhnaich (sometimes anglicized as Maldouen or Maldoven) was the son of Mormaer Ailín II, and ruled Lennox in 1217–1250.

== Biography ==
Like his predecessor Ailín II, he showed absolutely no interest in extending an inviting hand to oncoming French or English settlers. He has, moreover, gained a reputation amongst modern scholars as being one of the more conservative Gaelic rulers in thirteenth century Scotland.

Despite that, he seems to have remained loyal to his royal overlord. There is no evidence that he participated in any of the western-oriented rebellions which were so frequent in the era. The Mormaer even sent his son Maol Choluim with the king's expedition to Moray in 1232. He was also a witness to the treaty between King Alexander II of Scotland and his brother-in-law Henry III of England at Newcastle in 1237, concerning the much disputed northern counties of England.

Nevertheless, in 1238 Alexander distrusted him sufficiently to remove the Castle of Dumbarton from his control, giving the Scottish king an important foothold in the Mormaerdom. As part of the same act, Alexander II regranted the Mormaerdom to Maol Domhnaich as a military fief, indicating perhaps that the Mormaerdom's prior status was ambiguous.

He married c. 1230 Elizabeth or Beatrix Stewart (b. c. 1210), the daughter of Walter Stewart, the 3rd High Steward of Scotland, and wife Beatrix of Angus, and had two known sons (Maol Choluim and Donnchadh), and one daughter, Ada of Lennox, wife of Sir Malcolm Beg de Drummond (aft. 1169-1259), 6th (first recorded) Thane of Lennox, Chief of Clan Drummond, and mother of Sir Malcolm de Drummond (aft. 1209-1278), Thane of Lennox, in turn father of Sir John Drummond (aft. 1240-1301), Thane of Lennox, who married Elena Stewart, daughter of Walter Stewart, Earl of Menteith, and wife Mary I, Countess of Menteith, and had issue.

Maol Domhnaich's reign came to an end with his death in 1250.

== Bibliography ==
- Neville, Cynthia J., Native Lordship in Medieval Scotland: The Earldoms of Strathearn and Lennox, c. 1140-1365, (Portland & Dublin, 2005)

Preceded by Ailín II	Mormaer of Lennox; 1217–1250	Succeeded by Maol Choluim I
