= The Lennox =

Region of Scotland

Coordinates: 55.974°N 4.206°W

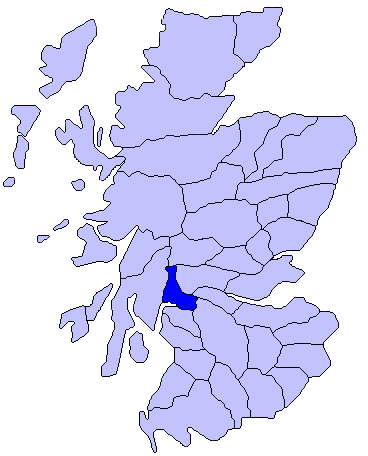
Map of Scotland showing the district of Lennox

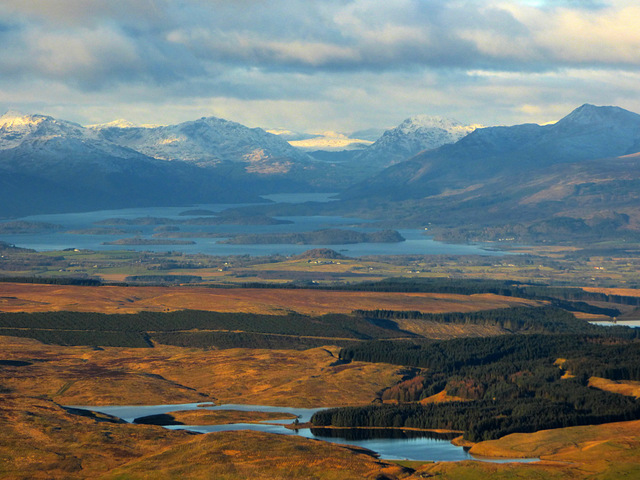
View over the Lennox from the Kilpatrick Hills

The Lennox (Scottish Gaelic: Leamhnachd, pronounced [ˈʎãũnəxk]) is a region of Scotland centred on the Vale of Leven, including its great loch: Loch Lomond.

The name Lennox (earlier Levenax) is a pluralised form of the Gaelic word Leamhnach, denoting a Lennox man, and ultimately derives from Leamhain, the Gaelic name for the River Leven.

Lennox was not one of the so-called seven ancient Provinces of Scotland, but formed as a province in the Middle Ages. The district embraced the whole of the ancient sheriffdom of Dumbarton: the parishes of Rosneath, Arrochar, Row, Luss, Cardross, Bonhill, Dumbarton, Kilmaronock, New Kilpatrick, Old Kilpatrick, Baldernock, Buchanan, Drymen, Killearn, Balfron, Fintry, and Strathblane, with Campsie and Kilsyth, being all within the bounds ruled over by the Earls of Lennox.

In 1581 James VI of Scotland granted Esmé Stewart, Earl of Lennox, the title of Duke of Lennox; the title is currently held by Charles Gordon-Lennox.

Under local government reforms in the mid-19th century, the province of Lennox was re-structured as the County of Dunbartonshire, when the north-eastern shore of Loch Lomond was transferred to Stirlingshire.
