= Duke of Lennox =

Title created several times in the peerage of Scotland

Dukedom of Lennox held with Dukedom of Richmond, Dukedom of Gordon
- Arms of the Duke of Richmond, Lennox and Gordon
- Creation date: 1581 (first creation); 1675 (second creation)
- Created by: James VI (first creation); Charles II (second creation)
- Peerage: Peerage of Scotland
- First holder: Esmé Stewart, 1st Duke of Lennox
- Present holder: Charles Gordon-Lennox, 11th Duke of Richmond
- Heir apparent: Charles Gordon-Lennox, Earl of March and Kinrara
- Remainder to: the 1st Duke's heirs male of the body lawfully begotten
- Extinction date: 1672 (first creation)
- Seat: Goodwood House

The title Duke of Lennox has been created several times in the peerage of Scotland, for Clan Stewart of Darnley. The dukedom, named for the district of Lennox in Dumbarton, was first created in 1581, and had formerly been the Earldom of Lennox. The second duke was made Duke of Richmond; at his death, the dukedom of Richmond became extinct. The fourth duke was also created Duke of Richmond; at the death of the sixth duke, both dukedoms became extinct. The Dukedom of Richmond and one month later that of Lennox were created in 1675 for Charles Lennox, an illegitimate son of Charles II. The Duke of Richmond and Lennox was created Duke of Gordon in 1876. Thus, the duke holds four dukedoms (if including Aubigny), more than any other person in the realm; or (not counting the putative French title) three, equal since 2022 to Prince William, Duke of Cornwall, of Rothesay and of Cambridge.

== Dukes of Lennox (1581) ==
Arms of Esmé Stuart, 1st Duke of Lennox

Created by James VI of Scotland
#	Name	Period	Duchess	Notes	Other titles
1	Esmé Stewart; 1542-1583	1581-1583	Catherine de Balsac	Relative and favourite of King James VI	Earl of Lennox
2	Ludovic Stewart; 1574-1624	1583-1624	Frances Howard	Son of the preceding	Duke of Richmond, Earl of Lennox, Earl of Richmond
3	Esmé Stewart; 1579-1624	1624	Katherine Clifton, 2nd Baroness Clifton	Brother of the preceding	Earl of Lennox, Earl of March
4	James Stewart; 1612-1655	1624-1655	Mary Villiers	Son of the preceding	Duke of Richmond, Earl of Lennox, Earl of March, Baron Clifton
5	Esmé Stewart; 1649-1660	1655-1660	unmarried	Son of the preceding	Duke of Richmond, Earl of Lennox, Earl of March, Baron Clifton
6	Charles Stewart; 1639-1672	1660-1672	Elizabeth Rogers, Margaret Banaster, Frances Stewart	Cousin of the preceding	Duke of Richmond, Earl of Lennox, Earl of March, Earl of Lichfield, Baron Clifton

== Dukes of Lennox (1675) ==
Created by Charles II of Scotland
#	Name	Period	Duchess	Notes	Other titles
1	Charles Lennox; 1672-1723	1675-1723	Anne Brudenell	Extramarital son of Charles II	Duke of Richmond, Earl of March, Earl of Darnley, Baron of Settrington, Lord of Torboulton
2	Charles Lennox; 1701-1750	1723-1750	Sarah Cadogan	Son of the preceding	Duke of Richmond, Earl of March, Earl of Darnley, Baron of Settrington, Lord of Torboulton
3	Charles Lennox; 1735-1806	1750-1806	Mary Bruce	Son of the preceding	Duke of Richmond, Earl of March, Earl of Darnley, Baron of Settrington, Lord of Torboulton
4	Charles Lennox; 1764-1819	1806-1819	Charlotte Gordon	Nephew of the preceding	Duke of Richmond, Earl of March, Earl of Darnley, Baron of Settrington, Lord of Torboulton
5	Charles Gordon-Lennox; 1791-1860	1819-1860	Caroline Paget	Son of the preceding	Duke of Richmond, Earl of March, Earl of Darnley, Baron of Settrington, Lord of Torboulton
6	Charles Gordon-Lennox; 1818-1903	1860-1903	Frances Greville	Son of the preceding	Duke of Richmond, Duke of Gordon, Earl of March, Earl of Darnley, Earl of Kinrara, Baron of Settrington, Lord of Torboulton
7	Charles Gordon-Lennox; 1845-1928	1903-1928	widowed	Son of the preceding	Duke of Richmond, Duke of Gordon, Earl of March, Earl of Darnley, Earl of Kinrara, Baron of Settrington, Lord of Torboulton
8	Charles Gordon-Lennox; 1870-1935	1928-1935	Hilda Brassey	Son of the preceding	Duke of Richmond, Duke of Gordon, Earl of March, Earl of Darnley, Earl of Kinrara, Baron of Settrington, Lord of Torboulton
9	Frederick Gordon-Lennox; 1904-1989	1935-1989	Elizabeth Hudson	Son of the preceding	Duke of Richmond, Duke of Gordon, Earl of March, Earl of Darnley, Earl of Kinrara, Baron of Settrington, Lord of Torboulton
10	Charles Gordon-Lennox; 1929-2017	1989-2017	Susan Grenville-Grey	Son of the preceding	Duke of Richmond, Duke of Gordon, Earl of March, Earl of Darnley, Earl of Kinrara, Baron of Settrington, Lord of Torboulton
11	Charles Gordon-Lennox b. 1955	since 2017	Janet Elizabeth Astor	Son of the preceding	Duke of Richmond, Duke of Gordon, Earl of March, Earl of Darnley, Earl of Kinrara, Baron of Settrington, Lord of Torboulton

The heir apparent is Charles Gordon-Lennox (b. 1994), eldest son of the 11th Duke.

== Family tree ==
Lennox, Richmond, and Gordon family tree including peerages of Aboyne, Aubigny, Enzie, Gordon, Huntly, Inverness, Kinrara, Lennox, March, Meldrum, Richmond, Settrington, and Strathaven, Balmore, Auchindoun, Garthie and Kincardine

Henry of Scotland; 1114–1152; Earl of Northumbria, Earl of Huntingdon
Mormaer of Lennox (1st creation), 12th century
Malcolm IV; 1141–1165; Earl of Huntingdon, later King of Scotland	William I c. 1142–1214; Earl of Huntingdon, later King of Scotland	David; 1152–1219; Mormaer of Lennox, Earl of Huntingdon	Ailín I d. c. 1200 possibly Mormaer of Lennox
Isobel of Huntingdon; 1199–1251	Ailín II d. 1217; Mormaer of Lennox
Robert V de Brus c. 1210–1295	Maol Domhnaich (Maldoven) d. 1250; Mormaer of Lennox	?	Gille Chriosd	Alexander Stewart c. 1214–1283; High Steward of Scotland
Robert VI de Brus; 1243–1304	Maol Choluim (Malcolm) I d. 1303; Mormaer of Lennox	Amlaibh	Clan MacFarlane	John Stewart d. 1298
Robert I 1274–1329; King of Scotland	Maol Choluim (Malcolm) II d. 1333; Mormaer of Lennox	?
Marjorie Bruce; 1296–1316	Domhnall (Donald) d. 1365; Mormaer of Lennox	?	Alan Stewart of Dreghorn d. 1333
Edward III; 1312–1377; King of England	Robert II; 1316–1390; King of Scotland	Margaret; Countess of Lennox (?)	Walter of Faslane (also Baltar mac Amlaimh) de facto Mormaer of Lennox	Alexander Stewart of Darnley d. 1374
Resigned, 1385
Earl of Richmond (5th creation), 1342
John of Gaunt; 1340–1399; Duke of Lancaster; Earl of Richmond	Adam de Gordon d. 1402; Lord of Gordon	Robert III; 1337–1406; King of Scots	Robert Stewart c. 1340–1420; Duke of Albany	Donnchadh; Mormaer of Lennox r. 1385–1425	Alexander Stewart of Darnley d. 1404
Earldom of Richmond (5th creation) surrendered, 1372
Lord of (Seigneur d')Aubigny, 1422
Henry IV; 1367–1413; King of England	John Beaufort; 1373–1410; Earl of Somerset	Elizabeth Gordon d. 1439 m. Alexander Seton d. 1440 or 1441; Lord Gordon	Murdoch Stewart; 1362-1425; Duke of Albany	Isabella d. 1458; Countess of Lennox	Elizabeth	John Stewart of Darnley c. 1380–1429; 1st Comte d'Évreux, Seigneur de Concressault, 1st Lord of Aubigny
Earldom of Lennox (1st creation) extinct, 1458
Earl of Richmond (6th creation), 1414	Earl of Huntly, 1445
John of Lancaster; 1389–1435; Duke of Bedford, Earl of Richmond	John Beaufort c. 1403–1444; Duke of Somerset	Alexander Seton (Gordon) d. 1470; 1st Earl of Huntly	James I 1394–1437; King of Scots	Joan Beaufort c. 1404–1445	James Stewart c. 1399 – c. 1451; Black Knight of Lorn	Alan Stewart of Darnley after 1406 – 1439	John Stewart d. 1482; 2nd Lord of Aubigny
Earldom of Richmond (6th creation) extinct, 1435
Earl of Richmond (7th creation), 1452	Earl of Lennox (2nd creation), 1488
Edmund Tudor; 1430–1456; 1st Earl of Richmond	Margaret Beaufort; 1443–1509	George Gordon d. 1501; 2nd Earl of Huntly	Annabella of Scotland c. 1433–1509	James II; 1430–1460; King of Scots	John Stewart a. 1430–1495; 1st Earl of Lennox	John Stewart c. 1440–1512; Earl of Atholl	Bernard Stewart c. 1452 – 1508; 3rd Lord of Aubigny
Henry Tudor; 1457–1509; 2nd Earl of Richmond, Later King Henry VII	James III; 1451–1488; King of Scots	Mary Stewart; 1453–1488
Earldom of Richmond (7th creation) merged into the Crown, 1509
Elizabeth Stewart d. after 1531	Matthew Stewart; 1460–1513; 2nd Earl of Lennox	Robert Stewart c. 1470–1544; 4th Lord of Aubigny	Anne
Henry VIII; 1491–1547; King of England	Alexander Gordon d. 1524; 3rd Earl of Huntly	James IV; 1473–1513; King of Scots	Margaret Tudor; 1489–1541	Archibald Douglas; 1489–1557; Earl of Angus	John Stewart c. 1490–1526; 3rd Earl of Lennox	Elizabeth Stewart
John Gordon d. 1517; Lord Gordon	Margaret Stewart b. 1498)
Earl of Lennox (4th creation), 1578
Duke of Richmond and Somerset, 1525	Earl of March (3rd Scottish creation), 1581
Henry Fitzroy; 1519–1536; Duke of Richmond and Somerset	George Gordon; 1514–1562; 4th Earl of Huntly	James V 1512–1542; King of Scots	Margaret Douglas; 1515–1578	Matthew Stewart; 1516–1571; 4th Earl of Lennox	Robert Stewart c. 1522–1586; Earl of Lennox, Earl of March	John Stewart d. 1567; 5th Lord of Aubigny
Dukedom of Richmond and Somerset extinct, 1536	Earldom of Lennox (2nd creation) merged with crown, 1571	Earldom of Lennox (4th creation) "exchanged" for the Earldom of March, 1580
Earl of Lennox (3rd creation), c. 1571	Earl of Lennox (5th creation), 1580; Duke of Lennox (1st creation), 1581
George Gordon d. 1576; 5th Earl of Huntly	Mary; 1542–1587; Queen of Scots	Henry Stuart; 1545–1567; Lord Darnley	Charles Stuart; 1557–1576; Earl of Lennox	Esmé Stewart; 1542–1583; Duke of Lennox, etc., 6th Lord of Aubigny
Earldom of Lennox (3rd creation) extinct, 1576
Earl of Richmond, Baron Settrington (1st creation), 1613
Marquess of Huntly, Earl of Enzie, and Lord Gordon of Badenoch, 1599	Duke of Richmond (1st creation), 1623	Earl of March (3rd English creation), 1619
George Gordon; 1562–1636; 1st Marquess of Huntly, etc., 6th Earl of Huntly	James VI and I 1566–1625; King of England and Scotland	Ludovic Stewart; 1574–1623; 2nd Duke of Lennox, 1st Duke of Richmond, etc.	Esmé Stewart; 1579–1624; 3rd Duke of Lennox, 2nd Earl of Richmond, 3rd Baron Settrington, 1st Earl of March, 7th Lord of Aubigny
Dukedom of Richmond, Earldom of Richmond and Settrington Barony extinct, 1623
Viscount Aboyne, 1632	Duke of Richmond (2nd creation), 1641
George Gordon c. 1592–1649; 2nd Marquess of Huntly, etc., 7th Earl of Huntly, 1st Viscount Aboyne	Charles I 1600–1649; King of England and Scotland	James Stewart; 1612–1655; 4th Duke of Lennox, 1st Duke of Richmond, 2nd Earl of March	Henry Stewart; 1616–1632; 8th Lord of Aubigny	George Stewart; 1618–1642; 9th Lord of Aubigny	Ludovic Stewart; 1619–1665; 10th Lord of Aubigny
Duke of Aubigny (France), 1684	Earl of Aboyne and Lord Gordon of Strathaven and Glenlivet, 1660
James Gordon c. 1620–1649; 2nd Viscount Aboyne	Lewis Gordon c. 1626–1653; 3rd Marquess of Huntly, etc., 8th Earl of Huntly	Charles II; 1630–1685; King of England and Scotland	Louise de Kérousaille; 1649–1734; Duchess of Portsmouth, Duchess of Aubigny	Charles Gordon c. 1638–1681; 1st Earl of Aboyne, etc.	Esmé Stewart; 1649–1660; 5th Duke of Lennox, 2nd Duke of Richmond, 3rd Earl of March	Charles Stewart; 1639–1672; 6th Duke of Lennox, 3rd Duke of Richmond, 4th Earl of March, 11th Lord of Aubigny
Aboyne Viscountcy extinct, 1649	Dukedoms of Lennox and Richmond, earl of March (3rd English creation), and lordship of Aubigny extinct, 1672
Duke of Gordon (1st creation), Viscount of Inverness, and Lord Strathaven, Balmore, Auchindoun, Garthie and Kincardine, 1684	Duke of Richmond (3rd creation), Duke of Lennox (2nd creation), Earl of March (4th English creation), Earl of Darnley, Baron Settrington of Settrington in the County of York (2nd creation), and Lord Torbolton, 1675
George Gordon; 1st Duke of Gordon, etc., 4th Marquess of Huntly, etc., 9th Earl of Huntly	Charles Lennox; 1672–1723; 1st Duke of Richmond and Duke of Lennox, etc., Duke of Aubigny	Charles Gordon c. 1670–1702; 2nd Earl of Aboyne, etc.
Alexander Gordon; 1720–1752; 2nd Duke of Gordon, etc., 5th Marquess of Huntly, etc., 10th Earl of Huntly	Charles Lennox; 1701–1750; 2nd Duke of Richmond and Duke of Lennox, etc., Duke of Aubigny	John Gordon d. 1732; 3rd Earl of Aboyne, etc.
Cosmo George Gordon; 1720–1752; 3rd Duke of Gordon, etc., 6th Marquess of Huntly, etc., 11th Earl of Huntly	Charles Lennox; 1735–1806; 3rd Duke of Richmond and Duke of Lennox, etc., Duke of Aubigny	George Lennox; 1737–1805	Charles Gordon c. 1726–1794; 4th Earl of Aboyne, etc.
Baron Gordon of Huntly, 1784
Alexander Gordon; 1743–1827; 4th Duke of Gordon, etc., 7th Marquess of Huntly, etc., 12th Earl of Huntly, 1st Earl of Norwich, 1st Baron Gordon of Huntly
Baron Meldrum of Morven in the County of Aberdeen, 1815; Marquess of Huntly reverted, 1838
George Duncan Gordon; 1770–1836; 5th Duke of Gordon, etc., 8th Marquess of Huntly, etc., 13th Earl of Huntly, 5th Earl of Enzie, 2nd Earl of Norwich, 2nd Baron Gordon of Huntly	Lady Charlotte Gordon; 1768–1842	Charles Lennox; 1764–1819; 4th Duke of Richmond and Duke of Lennox, etc., Duke of Aubigny, etc.	George Gordon; 1761–1853; 9th Marquess of Huntly, 14th Earl of Huntly, 5th Earl of Aboyne, etc., 1st Baron Meldrum
Dukedom of Gordon (1st creation), earldom of Norwich (4th creation), earldom of Enzie, viscountcy of Inverness, lordship Strathaven, Balmore, Auchindoun, Garthie and Kincardine, barony Gordon of Huntly extinct, 1836; Marquessate and earldom of Huntly continued with George Gordon, 5th Earl of Aboyne
Charles Gordon-Lennox; 1791–1860; 5th Duke of Richmond and Duke of Lennox, etc., Duke of Aubigny, etc.	Charles Gordon; 1792–1863; 10th Marquess of Huntly, 15th Earl of Huntly, 6th Earl of Aboyne, etc., 2nd Baron Meldrum
Duke of Gordon (2nd creation) and Earl of Kinrara, 1876
Charles Henry Gordon-Lennox; 1818–1903; 6th Duke of Richmond and Duke of Lennox, 1st Duke of Gordon, etc., 6th Duke of Aubigny, etc.
Charles Henry Gordon-Lennox; 1845–1928; 7th Duke of Richmond and Duke of Lennox, 2nd Duke of Gordon, etc., 7th Duke of Aubigny, etc.	Charles Gordon; 1847–1937; 11th Marquess of Huntly, 16th Earl of Huntly, 7th Earl of Aboyne, etc., 3rd Baron Meldrum	Granville Armyne Gordon; 1856–1907
Charles Henry Gordon-Lennox; 1870–1935; 8th Duke of Richmond and Duke of Lennox, 8th Duke of Aubigny, etc. 3rd Duke of Gordon, etc.	Granville Cecil Douglas Gordon; 1883–1930
Charles Henry Gordon-Lennox; 1899–1919; Lord Settrington	Frederick Charles Gordon-Lennox; 1904–1989; 9th Duke of Richmond and Duke of Lennox, 9th Duke of Aubigny, etc., 4th Duke of Gordon, etc.	Douglas Charles Lindsey Gordon; 1908–1987; 12th Marquess of Huntly, 18th Earl of Huntly, 8th Earl of Aboyne, etc., 4th Baron Meldrum
Charles Henry Gordon-Lennox; 1929–2017; 10th Duke of Richmond and Duke of Lennox, 10th Duke of Aubigny, etc., 5th Duke of Gordon, etc.
Charles Gordon-Lennox b. 1955; 11th Duke of Richmond and Duke of Lennox, 11th Duke of Aubigny, etc., 6th Duke of Gordon, etc.	Granville Charles Gomer Gordon b. 1944; 13th Marquess of Huntly, 18th Earl of Huntly, 9th Earl of Aboyne, etc., 5th Baron Meldrum
Charles Henry Gordon-Lennox b. 1994 styled Earl of March and Kinrara	Alastair Gordon b. 1973 styled Earl of Aboyne
Heir apparent to the dukedoms of Richmond, Lennox, Aubigny, and Gordon	Heir apparent to the marquessate of Huntly

== See also ==
- Duke of Richmond and Lennox
- Duke of Richmond
- Duke of Gordon
- Duke of Aubigny
- Earl of Lennox
- Stewart of Darnley
