= Viscount Aboyne =

Title in the Peerage of Scotland

Viscount Aboyne was a title in the Peerage of Scotland. It was created on 20 April 1632 for George Gordon, Earl of Enzie, eldest son of George Gordon, 1st Marquess of Huntly, with remainder that the title should pass to his second son the Hon. James Gordon on his death or on the death of his father, whichever came first. On Lord Huntly's succession to the marquessate in 1636 the viscountcy passed according to the special remainder to his second son, the second Viscount. He never married and on his death in 1649 the title became extinct.

== Viscounts Aboyne (1632) ==
- George Gordon, 2nd Marquess of Huntly, 1st Viscount Aboyne (d. 1649)
- James Gordon, 2nd Viscount Aboyne (d. 1649)

== Family tree ==
Peerage family tree of: Aboyne, Aubigny, Enzie, Gordon, Huntly, Inverness, Kinrara, Lennox, March, Meldrum, Richmond, Settrington, and Strathaven, Balmore, Auchindoun, Garthie and Kincardine

Mormaer of Lennox (1st creation), 12th century
William I c. 1142–1214; King of Scotland | David; 1152–1219; Mormaer of Lennox, Earl of Huntingdon | Ailín I d. c. 1200 possibly Mormaer of Lennox
Isobel of Huntingdon; 1199–1251 | Ailín II d. 1217; Mormaer of Lennox
Robert V de Brus c. 1210–1295 | Maol Domhnaich (Maldoven) d. 1250; Mormaer of Lennox | ? | Gille Chriosd
Robert VI de Brus; 1243–1304 | Maol Choluim (Malcolm) I d. 1303; Mormaer of Lennox | Amlaibh | Clan MacFarlane
Robert I 1274–1329; King of Scotland | Maol Choluim (Malcolm) II d. 1333; Mormaer of Lennox | ?
Marjorie Bruce; 1296–1316 | Domhnall (Donald) d. 1365; Mormaer of Lennox | ?
Edward III; 1312–1377; King of England | Robert II; 1316–1390; King of Scotland | Margaret; Countess of Lennox (?) | Walter of Faslane (also Baltar mac Amlaimh) de facto Mormaer of Lennox
Resigned, 1385
Earl of Richmond (5th creation), 1342
John of Gaunt; 1340–1399; Earl of Richmond, Duke of Lancaster | Robert III; 1337–1406; King of Scots | Robert Stewart c. 1340–1420; Duke of Albany | Donnchadh; 1385–1425; Mormaer of Lennox
Earldom of Richmond (5th creation) surrendered, 1372
Henry IV; 1367–1413; King of England | John Beaufort; 1373–1410; Earl of Somerset | Murdoch Stewart; 1362-1425; Duke of Albany | Isabella d. 1458; Countess of Lennox
Earldom of Lennox (1st creation) extinct, 1458
Earl of Richmond (6th creation), 1414 | Earl of Huntly, 1445
John of Lancaster; 1389–1435; Duke of Bedford, Earl of Richmond | John Beaufort c. 1403–1444; Duke of Somerset | Alexander Seton (Gordon) d. 1470; 1st Earl of Huntly | James I 1394–1437; King of Scots | Joan Beaufort c. 1404–1445 | James Stewart c. 1399 – c. 1451; Black Knight of Lorn
Earldom of Richmond (6th creation) extinct, 1435
Earl of Richmond (7th creation), 1452 | Earl of Lennox (2nd creation), 1488
Edmund Tudor; 1430–1456; 1st Earl of Richmond | Margaret Beaufort; 1443–1509 | George Gordon d. 1501; 2nd Earl of Huntly | Annabella of Scotland c. 1433–1509 | James II; 1430–1460; King of Scots | John Stewart bef. 1430–1495; 1st Earl of Lennox | John Stewart c. 1440–1512; Earl of Atholl
Henry Tudor; 1457–1509; 2nd Earl of Richmond, Henry VII; King of England | James III; 1451–1488; King of Scots | Mary Stewart; 1453–1488
Earldom of Richmond (7th creation) merged into the Crown, 1509
Elizabeth Hamilton | Matthew Stewart; 1460–1513; 2nd Earl of Lennox
Henry VIII; 1491–1547; King of England | Alexander Gordon d. 1524; 3rd Earl of Huntly | James IV; 1473–1513; King of Scots | Margaret Tudor; 1489–1541 | Archibald Douglas; 1489–1557; Earl of Angus | John Stewart c. 1490–1526; 3rd Earl of Lennox | Elizabeth Stewart
John Gordon d. 1517; Lord Gordon | Margaret Stewart b. 1498)
Duke of Richmond and Somerset, 1525 | Earl of Lennox (4th creation), 1578; Earl of March (3rd Scottish creation), 1581
Henry Fitzroy; 1519–1536; Duke of Richmond and Somerset | George Gordon; 1514–1562; 4th Earl of Huntly | James V 1512–1542; King of Scots | Margaret Douglas; 1515–1578 | Matthew Stewart; 1516–1571; 4th Earl of Lennox | Robert Stewart c. 1522–1586; Earl of Lennox, Earl of March | John Stewart d. 1567; 6th Seigneur d'Aubigny
Dukedom of Richmond and Somerset extinct, 1536 | Earldom of Lennox (2nd creation) merged with crown, 1571 | Earldom of Lennox (4th creation) "exchanged" for the Earldom of March, 1580
Earl of Lennox (3rd creation), c. 1571 | Earl of Lennox (5th creation), 1580; Duke of Lennox (1st creation), 1581
George Gordon d. 1576; 5th Earl of Huntly | Mary; 1542–1587; Queen of Scots | Henry Stuart; 1545–1567; Lord Darnley | Charles Stuart; 1557–1576; Earl of Lennox | Esmé Stewart; 1542–1583; Earl of Lennox, 1st Duke of Lennox, 7th Seigneur d'Aubigny
Earldom of Lennox (3rd creation) extinct, 1576
Marquess of Huntly, Earl of Enzie, and Lord Gordon of Badenoch, 1599 | Earl of Richmond, Baron Settrington, 1613, Duke of Richmond (1st creation), 1623 | Earl of March (3rd English creation), 1619
George Gordon; 1562–1636; 1st Marquess of Huntly, Earl of Enzie, and Lord Gordon of Badenoch, 6th Earl of Huntly | James VI and I 1566–1625; King of England and Scotland | Ludovic Stewart; 1574–1623; 2nd Duke of Lennox, 1st Duke of Richmond, Earl of Richmond, and Baron Settrington | Esmé Stewart; 1579–1624; 3rd Duke of Lennox, 2nd Earl of Richmond, 3rd Baron Settrington, 1st Earl of March, 7th Seigneur d'Aubigny
Dukedom of Richmond, Earldom of Richmond and Settrington Barony extinct, 1623
Viscount Aboyne, 1632 | Duke of Richmond (2nd creation), 1641
George Gordon c. 1592–1649; 2nd Marquess of Huntly, Earl of Enzie, and Lord Gordon of Badenoch, 7th Earl of Huntly, 1st Viscount Aboyne | Charles I 1600–1649; King of England and Scotland | James Stewart; 1612–1655; 4th Duke of Lennox, 1st Duke of Richmond, 2nd Earl of March | George Stewart; 1619–1642; 9th Seigneur d'Aubigny
Duke of Aubigny (France), 1684 | Earl of Aboyne and Lord Gordon of Strathaven and Glenlivet, 1660
James Gordon c. 1620–1649; 2nd Viscount Aboyne | Lewis Gordon c. 1626–1653; 3rd Marquess of Huntly, Earl of Enzie, and Lord Gordon of Badenoch, 8th Earl of Huntly | Charles II; 1630–1685; King of England and Scotland | Louise de Kérousaille; 1649–1734; Duchess of Portsmouth, Duchess of Aubigny | Charles Gordon c. 1638–1681; 1st Earl of Aboyne and Lord Gordon of Strathavon and Glenlivet | Esmé Stewart; 1649–1660; 5th Duke of Lennox, 2nd Duke of Richmond, 3rd Earl of March | Charles Stewart; 1639–1672; 6th Duke of Lennox, 3rd Duke of Richmond, 4th Earl of March, 11th Seigneur d'Aubigny
Aboyne Viscountcy extinct, 1649 | Dukedoms of Lennox and Richmond and Earl of March (3rd English creation) extinct, 1672
Duke of Gordon (1st creation), Viscount of Inverness, and Lord Strathaven, Balmore, Auchindoun, Garthie and Kincardine, 1684 | Duke of Richmond (3rd creation), Duke of Lennox (2nd creation), Earl of March (4th English creation), Earl of Darnley, Baron Settrington of Settrington in the County of York (2nd creation), and Lord Torbolton, 1675
George Gordon; 1st Duke of Gordon, Viscount of Inverness, and Lord Strathaven, Balmore, Auchindoun, Garthie and Kincardine, 4th Marquess of Huntly, Earl of Enzie, and Lord Gordon of Badenoch, 9th Earl of Huntly | Charles Lennox; 1672–1723; 1st Duke of Richmond, Duke of Lennox, Duke of Aubigny, Earl of March, Earl of Darnley, Baron Settrington, and Lord Torbolton | Charles Gordon c. 1670–1702; 2nd Earl of Aboyne and Lord Gordon of Strathavon and Glenlivet
Alexander Gordon; 1720–1752; 2nd Duke of Gordon, Viscount of Inverness, and Lord Strathaven, Balmore, Auchindoun, Garthie and Kincardine, 5th Marquess of Huntly, Earl of Enzie, and Lord Gordon of Badenoch, 10th Earl of Huntly | Charles Lennox; 1701–1750; 2nd Duke of Richmond, Duke of Lennox, Duke of Aubigny, Earl of March, Earl of Darnley, Baron Settrington, and Lord Torbolton | John Gordon d. 1732; 3rd Earl of Aboyne and Lord Gordon of Strathavon and Glenlivet
Cosmo George Gordon; 1720–1752; 3rd Duke of Gordon, Viscount of Inverness, and Lord Strathaven, Balmore, Auchindoun, Garthie and Kincardine, 6th Marquess of Huntly, Earl of Enzie, and Lord Gordon of Badenoch, 11th Earl of Huntly | Charles Lennox; 1735–1806; 3rd Duke of Richmond, Duke of Lennox, Duke of Aubigny, Earl of March, Earl of Darnley, Baron Settrington, and Lord Torbolton | George Lennox; 1737–1805 | Charles Gordon c. 1726–1794; 4th Earl of Aboyne and Lord Gordon of Strathavon and Glenlivet
Alexander Gordon; 1743–1827; 4th Duke of Gordon, Viscount of Inverness, and Lord Strathaven, Balmore, Auchindoun, Garthie and Kincardine, 7th Marquess of Huntly, Earl of Enzie, and Lord Gordon of Badenoch, 12th Earl of Huntly, 1st Earl of Norwich
Baron Meldrum of Morven in the County of Aberdeen, 1815; Marquess of Huntly reverted, 1838
George Duncan Gordon; 1770–1836; 5th Duke of Gordon, Viscount of Inverness, and Lord Strathaven, Balmore, Auchindoun, Garthie and Kincardine, 8th Marquess of Huntly, Earl of Enzie, and Lord Gordon of Badenoch, 13th Earl of Huntly, 5th Earl of Enzie, 2nd Earl of Norwich | Lady Charlotte Gordon; 1768–1842 | Charles Lennox; 1764–1819; 4th Duke of Richmond, Duke of Lennox, Duke of Aubigny, and Earl of March | George Gordon; 1761–1853; 9th Marquess of Huntly, 14th Earl of Huntly, 5th Earl of Aboyne and Lord Gordon of Strathavon and Glenlivet, 1st Baron Meldrum
Dukedom of Gordon (1st creation), Viscountcy of Inverness, and Lord Strathaven, Balmore, Auchindoun, Garthie and Kincardine, Earldom of Norwich (4th creation), Earldom of Enzie extinct, 1836
Charles Gordon-Lennox; 1791–1860; 5th Duke of Richmond, Duke of Lennox, Duke of Aubigny, Earl of March | Charles Gordon; 1792–1863; 10th Marquess of Huntly, 15th Earl of Huntly, 6th Earl of Aboyne and Lord Gordon of Strathavon and Glenlivet, 2nd Baron Meldrum
Duke of Gordon (2nd creation) and Earl of Kinrara, 1876
Charles Henry Gordon-Lennox; 1818–1903; 6th Duke of Richmond, 6th Duke of Lennox, 1st Duke of Gordon and Earl of Kinrara, 6th Duke of Aubigny, 6th Earl of March
Charles Henry Gordon-Lennox; 1845–1928; 7th Duke of Richmond, 7th Duke of Lennox, 2nd Duke of Gordon and Earl of Kinrara, 7th Duke of Aubigny, 7th Earl of March | Charles Gordon; 1847–1937; 11th Marquess of Huntly, 16th Earl of Huntly, 7th Earl of Aboyne and Lord Gordon of Strathavon and Glenlivet, 3rd Baron Meldrum | Granville Armyne Gordon; 1856–1907
Charles Henry Gordon-Lennox; 1870–1935; 8th Duke of Richmond, 8th Duke of Lennox, 8th Duke of Aubigny, 3rd Duke of Gordon and Earl of Kinrara, 8th Earl of March | Granville Cecil Douglas Gordon; 1883–1930
Charles Henry Gordon-Lennox; 1899–1919; Lord Settrington | Frederick Charles Gordon-Lennox; 1904–1989; 9th Duke of Richmond, 9th Duke of Lennox, 9th Duke of Aubigny, 4th Duke of Gordon and Earl of Kinrara, 9th Earl of March | Douglas Charles Lindsey Gordon; 1908–1987; 12th Marquess of Huntly, 18th Earl of Huntly, 8th Earl of Aboyne and Lord Gordon of Strathavon and Glenlivet, 4th Baron Meldrum
Charles Henry Gordon-Lennox; 1929–2017; 10th Duke of Richmond, 10th Duke of Lennox, 10th Duke of Aubigny, 5th Duke of Gordon and Earl of Kinrara, 10th Earl of March
Charles Gordon-Lennox b. 1955; 11th Duke of Richmond, 11th Duke of Lennox, 11th Duke of Aubigny, 6th Duke of Gordon and Earl of Kinrara, 11th Earl of March | Granville Charles Gomer Gordon b. 1944; 13th Marquess of Huntly, 18th Earl of Huntly, 9th Earl of Aboyne and Lord Gordon of Strathavon and Glenlivet, 5th Baron Meldrum
Charles Henry Gordon-Lennox b. 1994 styled Earl of March and Kinrara | Alastair Gordon b. 1973 styled Earl of Aboyne

== See also ==
- Aboyne Castle
- Earl of Aboyne
