= Battle of the Brig of Dee =

1639 battle in the First Bishops' War

- Part of First Bishops' War
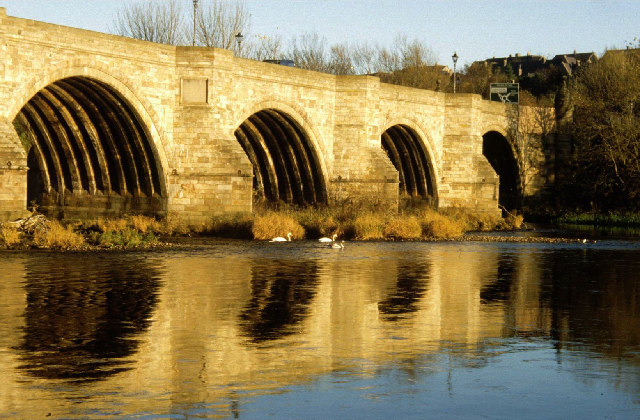
- Bridge of Dee, pictured in 1997
Date	18–19 June 1639
Location	Bridge of Dee, Aberdeen 57°07′22″N 02°07′12″W
Result	Covenanter victory

Belligerents
Scottish Royalists	Scottish Covenanters

Commanders and leaders
Viscount Aboyne; Lt-Colonel Johnstone	Earl of Montrose

Strength
100	2,300

Casualties and losses
14	14

The Battle of the Brig of Dee took place on 18–19 June 1639 at the Bridge of Dee in Scotland, and was the only serious military action of the First Bishops' War. It featured a Royalist force under James Gordon, 2nd Viscount Aboyne, opposed by Covenanters led by James Graham, 5th Earl of Montrose, and resulted in a Covenanter victory.

The war formed part of a series of conflicts known collectively as the 1638 to 1651 Wars of the Three Kingdoms, so-called because they also took place in England and Ireland. These include the Irish Confederate Wars, the First English Civil War, Second English Civil War, the Anglo-Scottish War of 1650-1652, and the Cromwellian conquest of Ireland.

== Background ==
Key location; First Bishops War 1639

The Protestant Reformation created a Church of Scotland, or "kirk", Presbyterian in structure, and Calvinist in doctrine. Presbyterian churches were ruled by Elders, nominated by congregations; Episcopalian were governed by bishops, appointed by the monarch. In 1584, bishops were imposed on the kirk against considerable resistance; since they also sat in parliament and usually supported royal policies, arguments over their role were as much about politics as religion.

The vast majority of Scots, whether Covenanter or Royalist, believed that a "well-ordered" monarchy was divinely mandated; they disagreed on what "well-ordered" meant, and who held ultimate authority in clerical affairs. Royalists generally emphasised the role of the monarch more than Covenanters, but there were many factors, including nationalist allegiance to the kirk, and individual motives were very complex. This is reflected by the fact that Montrose, Covenanter commander, fought for the Covenant in 1639 and 1640, then became a Royalist, and switching sides was common throughout the period.

When James VI and I succeeded as king of England in 1603, he viewed a unified Church of Scotland and England as the first step in creating a centralised, Unionist state. However, the two churches were very different in doctrine; even Scottish bishops violently opposed many Church of England practices. Widespread hostility to reforms imposed on the kirk by Charles I led to the National Covenant on 28 February 1638. Its signatories vowed to oppose any changes, and included Argyll and six other members of the Scottish Privy Council; in December, bishops were expelled from the kirk.

Charles decided to re-assert his authority by force, but preferred to rely on his own financial resources, rather than recalling parliament. An English army of 20,000 would advance on Edinburgh from the south, while an amphibious force of 5,000 under the Marquis of Hamilton were to land in Aberdeen, where it would link up with Royalist troops led by the Marquess of Huntly. Lastly, an Irish army under Randal MacDonnell, Earl of Antrim would invade western Scotland from Carrickfergus, then join with the MacDonalds and other Royalist clans.

Charles' preparations were hampered by lack of funds, while many in England were sympathetic to the Covenanter cause. The Scots quickly occupied Dumbarton, preventing any prospect of an Irish landing, while Montrose occupied Aberdeen in March, leaving Hamilton unable to disembark his poorly trained troops. In April, Lord Banff assumed command of Royalist forces in Aberdeenshire and temporarily re-occupied Aberdeen after two minor engagements, one at Towie Barclay Castle, where David Prat became the first casualty of the Wars of the Three Kingdoms, and the other at the Trot of Turriff.'

== Battle ==
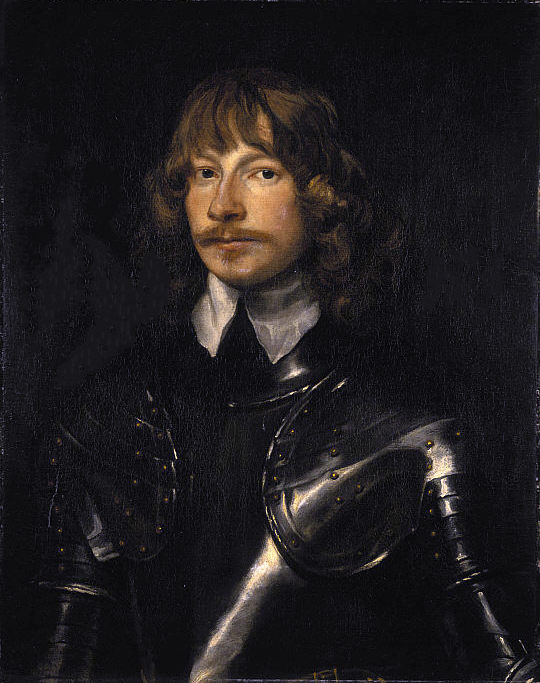
The Covenanter leader Montrose outmanoeuvred the Royalist defences

Although the main confrontation was at the border, the north-east of Scotland was a Royalist stronghold in the Covenanters' rear. It had already been the scene of some military manoeuvres without serious fighting.

After a failed offensive at Megray Hill on 15 June, James Gordon, Viscount Aboyne retreated to Aberdeen, but was split from the main body of his army: most of it was stranded on the other side of the River Dee, and between the two was James Graham, Earl of Montrose and his Covenanter army. In Aberdeen, Aboyne retained around 180 mounted troops, and even less infantry.

The Covenanters were approaching Aberdeen from the south, and in response, Aboyne posted a hundred musketeers on the bridge, commanded by Lieutenant Colonel Johnstone. At the southern entrance to the bridge, the gates were reinforced with an earthwork of "turfs and earth, as much as the shortness of the time would permit", and the Royalist cavalry was also posted to the bridge. The river was swollen by rain, making it impassable.

On 18 June, the Covenanter army, numbering 2,000 infantry, 300 horse, and artillery, reached the bridge and began their attack, primarily relying on their artillery. Firing on the barricade all through the day had minimal impact, and Montrose observed that efforts the next day produced no further breakthrough. He sent a troop of cavalry up the river, feigning an attempt to cross; Aboyne fell for the ruse, and deployed his entire cavalry to counteract the supposed attack. The Covenanters renewed their attack on the bridge, and Johnstone was injured by shrapnel. Johnstone and his musketeers retreated from the defence, allowing the attackers to capture the bridge.

Once Aboyne saw that the bridge had been taken, he withdrew from Aberdeen towards Strathbogie. Both sides suffering around fourteen fatalities during the battle.

== Aftermath ==
The Covenanters took Aberdeen, though the city remained more sympathetic to the beaten Royalists, and many of the Covenanters proposed razing the city, which Montrose prevented. The day after the victory, Montrose received news that the Treaty of Berwick had been agreed, ending the First Bishops' War.

== In fiction ==
An account of the battle appears in The Young Montrose, a historical novel by Nigel Tranter. It is also the setting for the ballad Bonny John Seton (Child Ballad no. 198).

== Sources ==
- Buchan, David (1985). "The Historical Ballads of the Northeast of Scotland". Lares. 51 (4): 443–451. JSTOR 44628673.
- Browne, James (1834). History of the Highlands & of the Highland Clans, Volume 1, Part 2. Glasgow: A Fullarton & Co. OCLC 653943490.
- Gaunt, Peter (1997). The British Wars 1637–1651. London: Routledge. ISBN 0-415-12966-4.
- Harris, Tim (2014). Rebellion: Britain's First Stuart Kings, 1567-1642. OUP. ISBN 978-0199209002.
- Jaques, Tony (2007). Dictionary of Battles and Sieges: F–O. London: Greenwood Press. ISBN 978-0-313-33536-5.
- Mackie, JD; Lenman, Bruce; Parker, Geoffrey (1986). A History of Scotland. Hippocrene Books. ISBN 978-0880290401.
- Main, David. "The Origins of the Scottish Episcopal Church". St Ninians Castle Douglas. Archived from the original on 7 April 2019.
- Manganiello, Stephen C. (2004). The Concise Encyclopedia of the Revolutions and Wars of England, Scotland, and Ireland, 1639–1660. Lanham, Maryland: The Scarecrow Press. ISBN 0-8108-5100-8.
- McDonald, Alan (1998). The Jacobean Kirk, 1567–1625: Sovereignty, Polity and Liturgy. Routledge. ISBN 185928373X.
- Napier, Mark (1838). Montrose and the Covenanters. London: James Duncan. OCLC 831420716.
- Royle, Trevor (2004). Civil War: The Wars of the Three Kingdoms 1638–1660 (2006 ed.). Abacus. ISBN 978-0-349-11564-1.
- Stephen, Jeffrey (January 2010). "Scottish Nationalism and Stuart Unionism". Journal of British Studies. 49 (1, Scottish Special). doi:10.1086/644534. S2CID 144730991.
- Tranter, Nigel (1972). The Young Montrose. London: Hodder & Stoughton. ISBN 978-1-4447-4104-9.

== Bibliography ==
- Buchan, John (1913). The Marquis of Montrose (2018 ed.). Franklin Classics. ISBN 978-0342803132.
- Hastings, Max (1977). Montrose: The King's Champion. Littlehampton Book Services. ISBN 978-0575022263.
