= First Bishops' War =

1639 conflict in Scotland

- Part of the Bishops' Wars
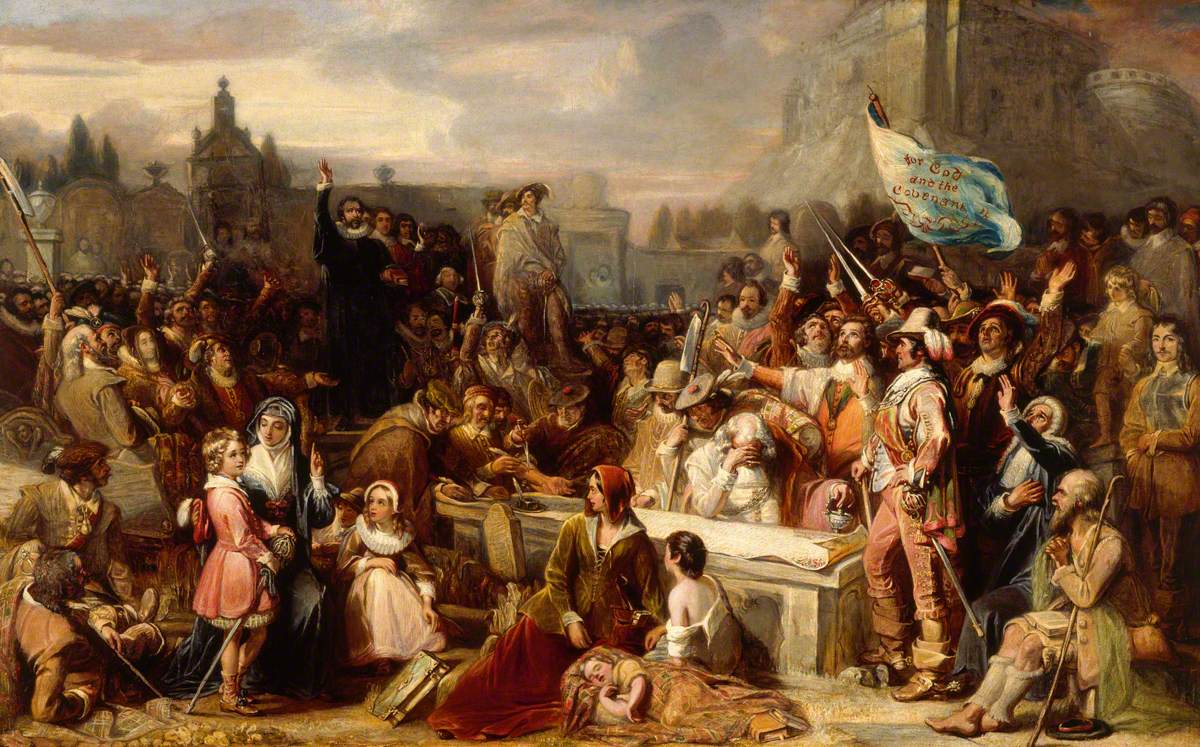
- Signing of the National Covenant in Greyfriars Kirkyard, Edinburgh
Date	February - June 1639
Location	Scotland
Result	Status quo ante bellum

Belligerents
Scottish Royalists; Kingdom of England	Scottish Covenanters

Commanders and leaders
(Kingdom of England) Charles I James Hamilton, 1st Duke of Hamilton; George Gordon, 2nd Marquess of Huntly (POW); James Gordon, 2nd Viscount Aboyne	Alexander Leslie; James Graham, Earl of Montrose
- Irish forces under Randal MacDonnell, 1st Marquess of Antrim also mustered but played no part in the campaign.

The First Bishops' War was a conflict that took place in Scotland in 1639 between a Scottish political movement known as the Covenanters and forces loyal to King Charles I, who at that time was the king of both Scotland and England. Military activity was mostly limited to skirmishing in the north-east of Scotland. Scottish and English armies assembled at the border in June 1639 but withdrew without a battle after agreeing to a treaty. However, this failed to resolve the political tensions and fighting resumed the next year with the Second Bishops' War. The Bishops' Wars were the first of a series now called the Wars of the Three Kingdoms.

The conflict was the result of tensions between Charles and his Scottish subjects which were exacerbated over the king's attempts to reform the Scottish Kirk. In opposition to these policies the Covenanters formed their own government and began the process of raising an army. These actions led Charles to order forces from England and Ireland to be raised to invade Scotland in support of Scottish royalists.

Charles' attempts to deal with the threat to his rule in Scotland failed with royalist forces in north-east Scotland being scattered, while the invasion from Ireland had to be aborted. Charles' generals advised against an invasion from England, which would have been the start of a long campaign. The conflict was ended by the Treaty of Berwick, which stipulated a return to the status quo ante bellum.

== Background ==
=== Personal Rule ===
During the 1620s England had been involved in a series of conflicts on mainland Europe and Charles I's efforts to fund these conflicts strained his relationship with the English Parliament, leading to a major confrontation in 1628–29 when Charles was forced to accept a Petition of Right ending many of the tax raising powers available to the monarch. The outbreak of peace in 1629 allowed Charles to rule without recourse to parliament, beginning a period known as the Personal Rule which would last until 1640. While outwardly a period of peace and prosperity, opposition against Charles was growing, in part over his use of medieval laws to raise money and his use of the prerogative courts of the Star Chamber and High Commission.

Charles also attempted to enforce consistent religious practices across his realm, prosecuting both those who supported a return to the Roman Catholic Church, and puritans who sought the end of episcopacy. Charles favoured Arminianism as preached by William Laud, whom he named Archbishop of Canterbury in 1633. This favouritism came at the expense of Calvinism which had been widely practised under James, with opponents of Charles and Laud equating their policies with Catholicism, to which Calvinists were strongly opposed. These concerns were heightened when Charles became involved in discussions with the papal envoy in the mid 1630s over the possibility of the Church of England reuniting with the Catholic Church, and the influence of Henrietta Maria, the Catholic queen, at court.

=== Opposition in Scotland ===
Charles' father, James VI and I, had made attempts to interfere in land titles, linked to his attempts to enhance the authority of the crown and to expand his financial base. In 1598 all Highland landowners were obliged to prove the legal deeds to their lands and to provide sureties of dues payable to the crown. Charles continued with these objectives and in 1625 introduced the Act of Revocation under which Kirk or royal property alienated since 1540 was taken back by the crown. This alarmed the Scottish nobility and raised the possibility of all property right being attacked.

From his accession in March 1625 Charles was the first permanently absent ruler of Scotland, relying on Scots resident in England, from where he ruled both kingdoms, to advise him. James had sought to rein in the independently minded Kirk and bring Scottish religious practices inline with those in England, including the reintroduction of bishops and taking control of the general assembly. Charles had continued these policies over the objections of the Presbyterian Kirk and during his brief visit in 1633 for his coronation as king of Scotland the elaborate and ritualistic ceremony led by Archbishop Laud had offended Scottish tastes. In 1637, a modified version of the prayer book similar to those used by the Church of England was forced upon the Kirk, previously without any consistently defined form of worship, leading to riots starting in St Giles', Edinburgh. Time and distance prevented Charles from responding effectively as the situation escalated with Scottish nobles lining up behind their ministers to reject these ecclesiastical reforms and taking advantage of Scotland's looser legal system to mount a direct challenge to the king's rule. The issue of the prayerbook provided an easily understood issue upon which to rally public support.

By 1638 those opposing the king's policies had created an organisational structure based on the Tables (nobles, lairds, burgesses, and ministers) with leadership coming from an executive table, with petitions against the prayerbook from Scottish localities organised. A National Covenant was drawn up in January 1638 which while moderately worded was an attack on Charles' Personal Rule and sought to justify a revolt against the sovereign, including a demand for assemblies and parliaments free of royal interference. A government of the Tables in Edinburgh, despite having no legal basis, began to raise an army and summoned Alexander Leslie, a veteran of the Swedish army, to lead it. Scottish emissaries were sent abroad as if they had plenipotentiary powers, as well as to England to garner support among fellow Presbyterians. Combined, these developments led to Charles believing his Scottish subjects were engaged in rebellion against him, forcing him to respond with force.

== Opposing forces ==
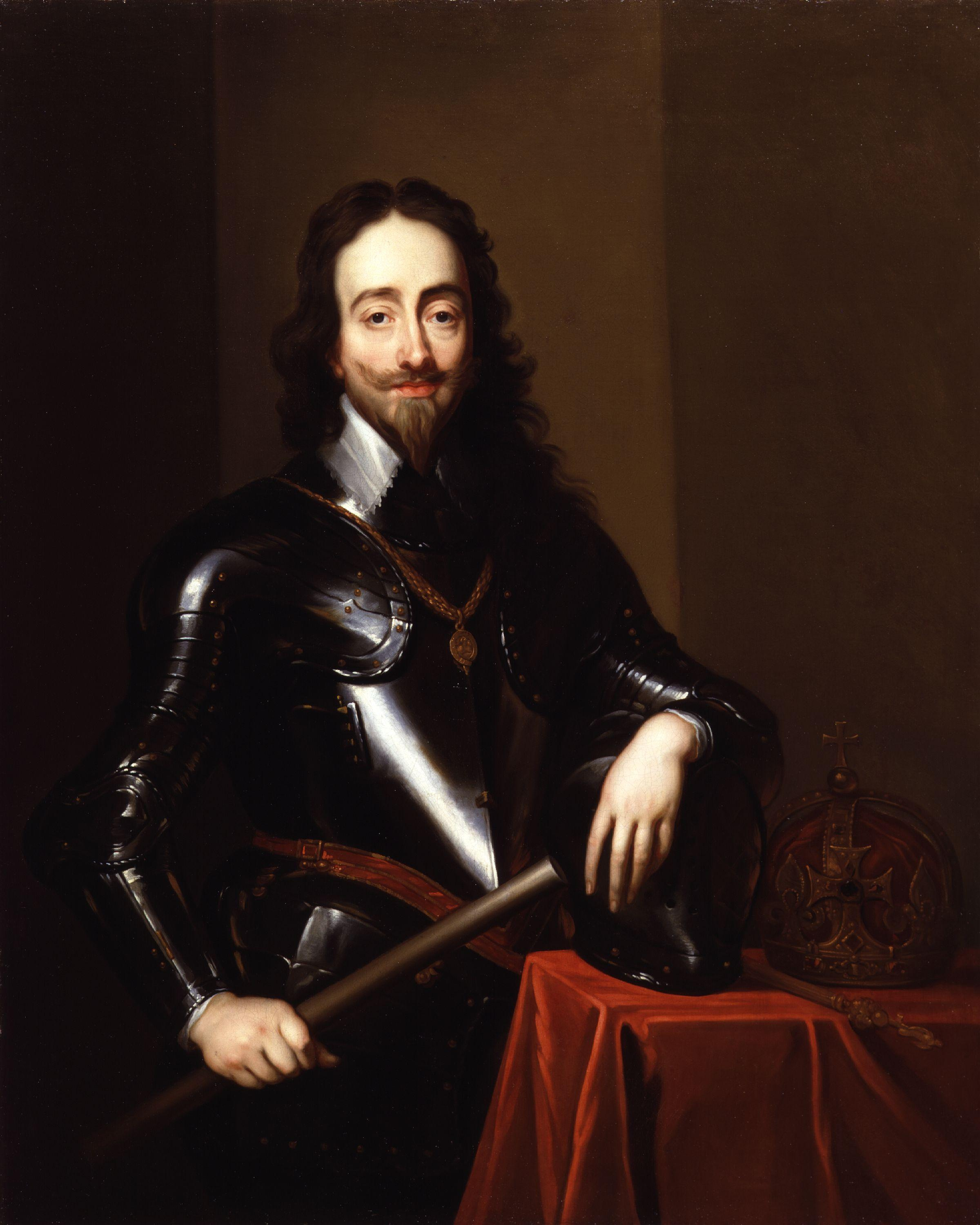
Portrait of Charles I by Anthony van Dyck, c. 1635

=== Royalists ===
Charles' strategy in 1639 was to rely on his allies inside Scotland, combined with concentric blows from outside the country to cause a collapse of the Covenanter forces. In north-east Scotland George Gordon, 2nd Marquess of Huntly, raised an army of the king's supporters aiming to take control of the region, while James Hamilton, 1st Duke of Hamilton was to land a force in the Firth of Forth. These were to be aided by Randal MacDonnell, 1st Marquess of Antrim, who was to raise his followers in Ireland and Scotland with the aim of gaining control of the western Highlands and islands. The king meanwhile intended to rally an English army at Berwick-upon-Tweed. It is unclear if Charles intended to wait for the collapse of the Covenanter forces before entering Scotland in triumph, or if he intended to fight his way to Edinburgh.

==== Scottish Royalists ====
Huntly remained loyal to the king and by September 1638 was organising efforts to promote the King's Covenant in north-east Scotland as a rival to the National Covenant, and had begun preparations for war by January 1639 with arms sent via Hamilton, along with his commission as king's lieutenant in northern Scotland. A naval expedition to reinforce the Royalists in the north-east was planned but never arrived.

==== Irish Royalists ====
Antrim was connected to, and able to exercise influence over, a number of clans both in Ulster and along the western coast of Scotland. These clans shared a common heritage and were united by a desire to see Clan Campbell expelled from the Western Isles of Scotland. Hamilton was eager to create an alliance against Clan Campbell, and suggested to Charles in May 1638 that an army raised and paid for by Antrim should be the first line of offence in western Scotland.

Antrim received orders from the king to raise forces late in 1638. Where possible, Antrim was to be supported by Wentworth, Lord Deputy of Ireland. In return the king promised Antrim "whatsoever land he can conquer from them [the Campbells], he, having pretense of right, he shall have the same". By spring 1639 Antrim would manage to raise 5,000 foot and 200 horse drawn from the leading families of Ulster, but these men were untrained and Antrim's wish to recall Irish veterans serving in Europe to lead and train his troops was rejected by Wentworth. A failure of communication with the king, and a lack of any form of support from the authorities in Dublin would ultimately lead to the expedition being aborted.

==== English militias ====
In 1639 England had no standing army and the force Charles ordered to muster consisted of the militia of the northern counties, alongside a special levy of 6,000 volunteers and additional horse troops raised through invoking half-forgotten feudal obligations of the king's tenants-in-chief. By March this army numbered 20,000. The militia regiments should have consisted of trained yeomanry and minor gentry, but in practice these men had made use of a substitution clause in the Militia Act to send the lower classes instead. Jacob Astley, a veteran of wars in Europe, was appointed to lead the infantry and upon arrival at the muster at York was shocked by the state of the militiamen and their inadequate weapons.

==== Naval blockade ====
Under the command of Hamilton, a flotilla of ships carrying 5,000 men sailed up the Firth of Forth on 1 May 1639. Although named general of the king's forces in Scotland, Hamilton would increasingly look to secure a negotiated settlement, while also looking to his own preservation. Fearing the Covenanters would seize his estates Hamilton failed to put ashore, instead remaining aboard the ships. Hamilton may also have been dissuaded by his mother who arrived at Leith threatening to shoot him with specially made silver bullets if he landed in Scotland. The objective of blockading the ports along the Forth was however achieved.

=== Covenanters ===
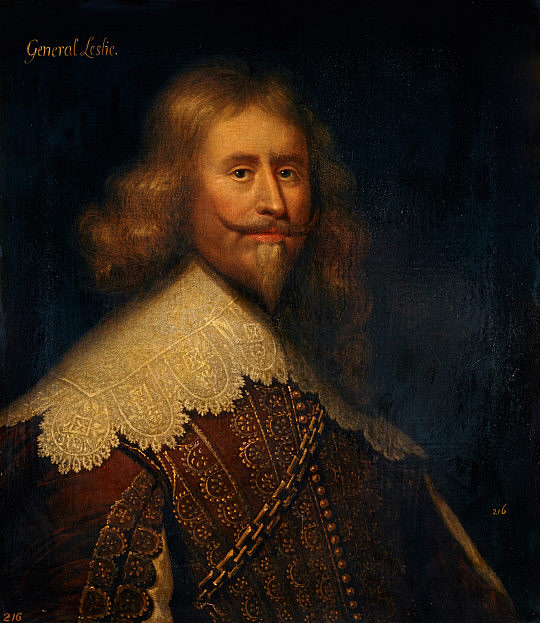
Alexander Leslie

Following the Union of the Crowns the need for constant military training in Scotland had diminished. Some men had seen action in the western Isles and in the Highlands, but these campaigns had involved few lowlanders and only the clans had large reserves of trained manpower as a consequence of military training remaining an important part of a Highland man's education. Leslie returned to Scotland in the summer of 1638 and began working as a military advisor to the Covenanters and managed to tactfully combine the disparate elements at his disposal, making use of veterans returning to Scotland from the Thirty Year's War to train and lead the army, without alienating the nobles and lairds who presumed it was their right and duty to recruit men in the localities and to lead them. Sufficient numbers of veterans recalled to Scotland would return to train the army in time for the campaign of 1639, and Leslie was also able to advise on the procurement of arms from the continent. These arms included two cannons and 2,000 muskets gifted to Leslie upon his retirement from Swedish service in support of the Covenanters cause.

The Covenanters' strategy was to gain control of the royal castles, suppress support for the king within Scotland, and prevent a landing from Ireland. Leslie would be granted a commission as general of all Scottish forces on 9 May 1639, deliberately chosen as someone who stood outside the tensions which could have caused rivalry and feuding which may have undermined the Covenanters' efforts. With internal threats dealt with, Leslie's strategy was simply to build up an army to deter an attack, with no thought of entering England.

== Campaign ==
Key locations in Scotland; First Bishops War 1639

=== Within Scotland ===
The Covenanters campaign started in February 1639 with the seizure of Inverness burgh and castle. Opposition in north-east Scotland was led by the Marquess of Huntly who raised the Royalists of Aberdeenshire and Banffshire on 13 February, but he failed to gain control of the north-east. On 30 March a Covenanter army under the command of James Graham, Earl of Montrose, and Alexander Leslie entered the Royalist burgh of Aberdeen and captured Huntly. Parallel to this, Covenanter forces also seized Edinburgh and Dumbarton castles on 21 and 26 March respectively, securing the capital and reducing the possibility of a landing by Irish forces. The first battle of the campaign was fought at Turriff in Aberdeenshire on 14 May. The local Royalists had occupied a defensive position, and the Covenanter forces were scattered with such speed the event became known as the Trot of Turriff.

Huntly's second son, the Viscount Aboyne, took command of the Royalists in north-east Scotland following his father's capture, and entered Aberdeen on 6 June but apparently lacked a clear plan. By 15 June his men had only advanced as far as Stonehaven, 15 miles south of Aberdeen. The Earl Marischal mustered the men of the Mearns and his cannon fire forced the Royalists to retreat to Aberdeen, where they fortified the Bridge of Dee. The Battle of the Brig of Dee was fought on 18–19 June, neither side realizing peace had already been declared at the Treaty of Berwick earlier on the 18th. The skirmish was a victory for the Covenanters, now being led by the Earl of Montrose, who scattered the Royalist forces. This campaign in north-east Scotland represented the only fighting in the First Bishops' War.

=== Anglo-Scottish border ===
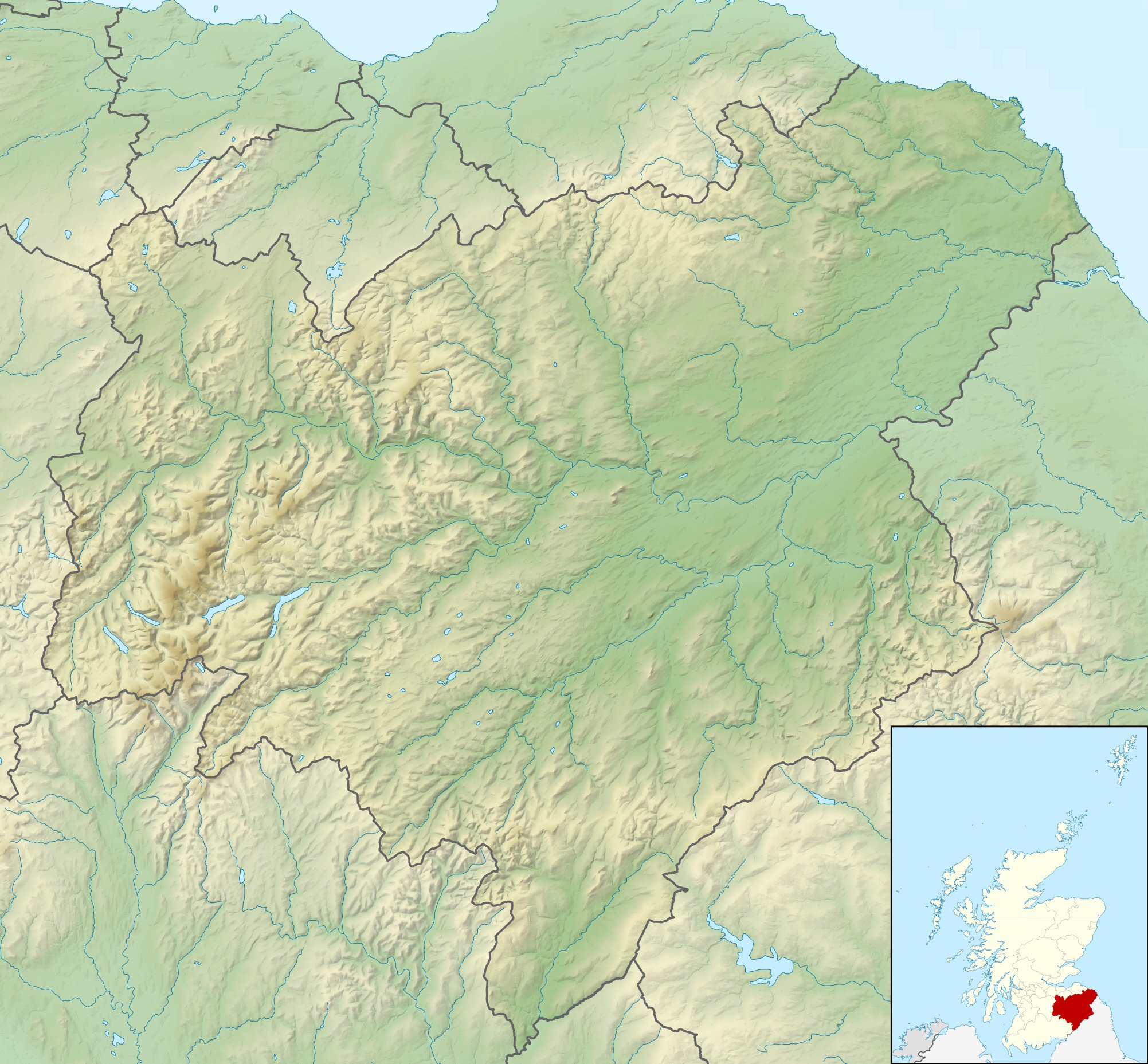
Key locations Scottish Borders; First Bishops War 1639

On 20 May Alexander Leslie concentrated a force of 12,000–20,000 on Duns Law, which he fortified. Charles moved his force he had mustered at York north to a fortified camp at Birkhill, west of Berwick. On 3 June the English received intelligence of a Covenanter force based at Kelso, within striking distance of the English camp. Henry Rich, 1st Earl of Holland was given command of 1,000 horse and 3,000 foot and ordered to drive the Covenanters out of Kelso if possible. During the march the foot fell behind the horse, and when Holland reached the Covenanter lines he perceived himself to be outnumbered, choosing to withdraw. It is likely Leslie had managed to deceive the English by using the lay of the land and the formation of his men to make his force appear larger than it was. This incident led to a loss of morale among the English soldiers and generals.

It became clear that the king's strategy for the subjugation of Scotland had failed. Faced with low resources and the Covenanters in control of the strong points which had historically slowed down invasions from England, Charles' generals advised against becoming bogged down in a long campaign. Peace negotiations began on 5 June after a confrontation between the opposing forces at Duns Law. On 18 June the king and Covenanter nobles signed the Treaty of Berwick, stipulating a return to the status quo ante bellum.

== Aftermath ==
The Treaty of Berwick was an unsatisfactory compromise for both sides. While the Covenanters position in Scotland was maintained, they had failed to gain royal approval for their policies, and the armies of the king had suffered humiliation, leaving the king no closer to gaining control of Scotland. The treaty did allow for a general assembly of the church to be held, as well as a parliament. The 1639 General Assembly held in Edinburgh ratified the abolition of episcopacy and the Covenanters prepared a radical political and constitutional agenda for the parliament which met on 31 August. John Stewart, Earl of Traquair and King's Commissioner in Scotland prorogued this session of parliament in an attempt to prevent this constitutional attack. This agenda was enacted by the Scottish Parliamentary sessions of 1640–1641, which convened without royal approval, weakening the royal prerogative in Scotland and strengthening the powers of the Scottish Parliament.

Although aborted, Antrim's intended expedition was not without significance. In Scotland, it forced the Earl of Argyll into the Covenanting camp along with his supporters, while in England it showed Charles was willing to conspire with an Irish Catholic against his Protestant subjects, helping fuel rumours of popish plots circulating around London. Argyll's move to the Covenanters was important militarily, as the Highland clansmen he brought with him represented a reserve of trained manpower otherwise unavailable to the Covenanters.

Conflict between the two sides resumed in May 1640 as the Second Bishops' War began. Following defeat at the battle of Newburn Charles was forced to agree to the Treaty of Ripon in October, under which the Covenanters' army would remain in control of north-east England until their expenses had been met and terms agreed with the English Parliament. These terms obliged Charles to summon what would become known as the Long Parliament, a body he was unable to disband at will. An escalating series of provocations between Parliament and Charles would lead to the First English Civil War.

== Sources ==
- Archibald, Malcolm (2016). Dance If Ye Can: A Dictionary of Scottish Battles. Creativia. ISBN 978-1536821796.
- Brooks, Richard (2005). Cassell's battlefields of Britain and Ireland. London: Weidenfeld & Nicolson. ISBN 0-304-36333-2.
- Cannon, J. A. (2009). "Revocation Act". In Cannon, John (ed.). The Oxford Companion to British History. Oxford University Press. ISBN 978-0-19-956763-8.
- Cust, Richard (17 February 2011). "British History in depth: The Personality and Political Style of Charles I". BBC – History. BBC.
- Fissel, Mark Charles (1994). The Bishops' Wars: Charles I's Campaigns Against Scotland, 1638–1640. Cambridge University Press. ISBN 978-0-521-46686-8.
- Furgol, Edward (1998). "The Civil Wars in Scotland". In Kenyon, John; Ohlmeyer, Jane (eds.). The Civil Wars: A Military History of England, Scotland, and Ireland 1638–1660. Oxford University Press. ISBN 0-19-866222-X.
- Kenyon, John; Ohlmeyer, Jane (1998a). "The Background to the Civil Wars in the Stuart Kingdoms". In Kenyon, John; Ohlmeyer, Jane (eds.). The Civil Wars: A Military History of England, Scotland, and Ireland 1638–1660. Oxford University Press. ISBN 0-19-866222-X.
- Kenyon, John; Ohlmeyer, Jane (1998b). "Chronology". In Kenyon, John; Ohlmeyer, Jane (eds.). The Civil Wars: A Military History of England, Scotland, and Ireland 1638–1660. Oxford University Press. ISBN 0-19-866222-X.
- Kishlansky, Mark A; Morrill, John (2008). "Charles I (1600–1649)". Oxford Dictionary of National Biography (online ed.). Oxford University Press. doi:10.1093/ref:odnb/5143. (Subscription, Wikipedia Library access or UK public library membership required.)
- Lynch, Michael (1992). Scotland: A New History. London: Pimlico. ISBN 978-0-712-69893-1.
- Ohlmeyer, Jane (2008). "MacDonnell, Randal, marquess of Antrim". Oxford Dictionary of National Biography (online ed.). Oxford University Press. doi:10.1093/ref:odnb/17462. (Subscription, Wikipedia Library access or UK public library membership required.)
- Scally, John J. (2013). "Hamilton, James, first duke of Hamilton". Oxford Dictionary of National Biography (online ed.). Oxford University Press. doi:10.1093/ref:odnb/12087. (Subscription, Wikipedia Library access or UK public library membership required.)
- Stevenson, David (2007). "Leslie, Alexander, first earl of Leven". Oxford Dictionary of National Biography (online ed.). Oxford University Press. doi:10.1093/ref:odnb/16482. (Subscription, Wikipedia Library access or UK public library membership required.)
- Stevenson, David (2014). "Gordon, George, second marquess of Huntly". Oxford Dictionary of National Biography (online ed.). Oxford University Press. doi:10.1093/ref:odnb/11037. (Subscription, Wikipedia Library access or UK public library membership required.)
- UK Parliament. "The Personal Rule of Charles I". parliament.uk. UK Parliament.
- Young, John (2007). "Covenant, Wars of the". In Lynch, Michael (ed.). The Oxford companion to Scottish history. New York: Oxford University Press. ISBN 9780199234820.
- Young, John (October 2013). "Scotland and Ulster connections in the seventeenth century : Sir Robert Adair of Kinhilt and the Scottish Parliament under the covenanters". Journal of Scotch-Irish Studies. 3 (4): 16–76. ISSN 1535-9840.
