= James Gordon, 2nd Viscount Aboyne =

James Gordon, 2nd Viscount Aboyne (c. 1620 – February 1649) was the second son of George Gordon, 2nd Marquess of Huntly, a Scottish royalist commander in the Wars of the Three Kingdoms.

== Early life ==
Aboyne was a member of the powerful Gordon family, who were notable for their Roman Catholic sympathies in a kingdom where supporters of the Protestant Reformation controlled the central government. Although there is little direct evidence for Aboyne's personal religious views, he was clearly opposed to extreme Protestantism, and he played a significant role in recruiting Catholics for the royalist cause.

He was educated at King's College, Aberdeen, and earned youthful military experience in France, where his father commanded of the Garde Écossaise. Unusually for a younger son, James Gordon also inherited a peerage, becoming 2nd Viscount Aboyne in 1636.

== The Bishops' Wars ==
In 1639, the First Bishops' War broke out, in which the Protestant faction known as the Covenanters attempted to seize control of church and state. The Covenanter army dispatched the dashing young James Graham, Earl of Montrose to deal with the Gordons.

Viscount Aboyne was just nineteen, but he seems to have been regarded throughout the campaign as the effective leader of the anti-Covenanter forces, even before his father and elder brother surrendered. Later, he continued the war in spite of a lack of effective support from King Charles's royal government.

The teenage general suffered two reverses in June 1639 at Megray Hill and Brig o' Dee, attributed to unsteady infantry and dissent between his officers, but his losses were light, and his cavalry performed credibly, remaining in the field until they learned that the king had made peace with the Covenanters. It is also worth noting that Aboyne's defence of Aberdeen at Brig o'Dee was so determined that the battle lasted two days (18 and 19 June) before Montrose finally dislodged him.

In this short campaign, the Gordon cavalry anticipated the tactics of the English Civil War: they often moved as a mounted column without infantry support, and they usually charged with the sword, discovering how ineffective a pistol caracole could be at Megray. Unusually, it seems that Aboyne's elite troop of one hundred "gentleman volunteer cuirassiers" were clad in full armour, in contrast to the buff coats and breastplate now favored by most cavalry regiments. This was still sought-after equipment, as it gave protection against bullet and sword-thrusts, and in the English Civil War it was worn by generals' bodyguards and the famous London lobsters.

== Scottish Civil War ==
For the next few years, a tenuous peace held in Scotland. Viscount Aboyne seems to have kept a low profile, living partially in England, but in 1642, the First English Civil War broke out, setting King Charles against his Parliament.

Aboyne now worked hard to arrange a military alliance with Clan Donald and the Irish Confederates, and came to be associated politically with the Scottish earls of Nithsdale, Crawford and Airlie - all open or suspected Catholics. Not unreasonably, their enemies saw this as a war plan to restore the old religion.

But Aboyne also found common cause with his former opponent Montrose, a loyal royalist as well as a committed Presbyterian; both of them believed the Scottish Covenanters were now likely to enter the war on Parliament's side.

Aboyne spent 1644 with royalist forces around Carlisle, while his brothers raised the family's forces in the north. The next spring, he returned to Scotland, fighting in Montrose's victories at Auldearn, Alford, and at Kilsyth; in each battle, he led a flanking charge on the left wing that broke the Covenanters' right. After Alford, there is some evidence that he was promoted in the peerage, under the title of Earl of Aboyne.

Yet while the army was victorious on the field, Aboyne's personal position was increasingly difficult. His father, the Marquess of Huntly, believed the family's troops should be used to eliminate the Covenanters in the north - in contrast with Montrose, who intended to march south into England. At the same time, the relationship between Montrose and Aboyne was becoming strained, not least when the Earl of Crawford was appointed to command the army's cavalry, an awkward role when Aboyne commanded the only large mounted force.

In September 1645, Aboyne and the Gordon cavalry withdrew to the north, shortly before the Battle of Philiphaugh. With hindsight, Aboyne's action is sometimes said to have cost the royalists the battle and the war.

In reality, the war was far from over at Philiphaugh. Montrose moved north, and in spite of Huntly's increasingly pathological inability to cooperate with him, the royalist armies proved largely successful in the field. Aboyne, caught between his father and his general, busied himself raising troops in the central Highlands.

The cause was undermined not by the Scottish war, but by the weakening position of the king in England. At the end of April 1646, King Charles decided that the best course was joining the Covenanters, and ordered his Scottish troops to lay down their arms.

== Outlaw and exile ==
Huntly and Aboyne doubted the Covenanters' mercy, and with their cavalry, they withdrew into the Highlands to wage a guerilla war. They remained under arms until December 1647, when the Marquess was captured in a Covenanter raid.

Aboyne escaped, but he had only a few troops left. Excluded from the general pardons issued to Scots royalists, he is said to have fled to France and died in exile in Paris around February 1649 - of a fever according to some, while others say he died of grief at the news of King Charles's beheading.

Viscount Aboyne had never married, and his title thus became extinct, although the title of Earl of Aboyne was later revived for his younger brother. Since his elder brother's death at Alford, he had also been heir to the Marquessate (with the courtesy title Earl of Enzie, although this was rarely used); these dignities now passed to his younger brother, Lord Lewis Gordon.

== Bibliography ==
- "Gordon, James (d.1649)" . Dictionary of National Biography. London: Smith, Elder & Co. 1885–1900.
- The Complete Peerage, ed. G.E.C., s.nn. "Aboyne", "Huntly" (vol i. 52-53, vi. 681)
- The Scots Peerage, ed. Sir James Balfour Paul (9 vols, 1904–1914); s.nn. "Gordon, Viscount of Aboyne" and "Gordon, Marquis of Huntly", (vol. i. 101, iv. 545-9)
- Buchan, John, Montrose - A History (1928)
- Manganiello, Stephen C., The Concice Encyclopedia of the Revolutions and Wars of England, Scotland and Ireland, 1639-1660 (2004)
- Reid, Stuart, Scots Armies of the English Civil Wars (1999)
- Stevenson, David, "Gordon, George, second marquess of Huntly (c.1590–1649)", Oxford Dictionary of National Biography, Oxford University Press, 2004 accessed 19 Nov 2010
- Stevenson, David, "Gordon, James, second Viscount Aboyne (d. 1649)", Oxford Dictionary of National Biography, Oxford University Press, 2004 accessed 19 Nov 2010

Peerage of Scotland
Preceded by George Gordon	Viscount Aboyne; 1636–1649	Extinct
