= Granville Gordon, 13th Marquess of Huntly =

Scottish nobleman

The Most Honourable The Marquess of Huntly
- Born: Granville Charles Gomer Gordon; 4 February 1944 (age 81)
- Residence: Aboyne Castle
- Spouse(s): Jane Elizabeth Angela (m. 1972; div. 1990) Catheryn Kindersley Milbourn (after 1991)
- Issue: Alastair Gordon, Earl of Aboyne; Lady Amy Gordon; Lady Lucy Gordon; Lady Rose Gordon
- Parents: Douglas Gordon, 12th Marquess of Huntly; The Hon. Mary Pamela Berry

Granville Charles Gomer Gordon, 13th Marquis of Huntly (born 4 February 1944), styled Earl of Aboyne until 1987, is a Scottish peer and the Premier Marquess of Scotland.

He was a hereditary member of the House of Lords from 1987 to 1999.

== Early life ==
Huntly is the son of Douglas Gordon, 12th Marquess of Huntly, by the Honourable Mary Pamela Berry, daughter of Gomer Berry, 1st Viscount Kemsley. His older sister, Lady Pamela Lemina Gordon, married the Hon. Ian Henry Lawson-Johnston (second son of Ian Lawson-Johnston, 2nd Baron Luke) in 1970. He was educated at Gordonstoun.

== Career ==
He succeeded to the marquessate of Huntly in 1987 on the death of his father (who had inherited the marquessate from his great-uncle, Charles Gordon, 11th Marquess of Huntly) and contributed occasionally in the House of Lords. However, he lost his seat in parliament after the passing of the House of Lords Act 1999. He is also the Chief of Clan Gordon.

== Personal life ==
He married Jane Elizabeth Angela, daughter of Alistair Monteith Gibb, in 1972. They had one son and two daughters before getting divorced in 1990:

- Alastair Gordon, Earl of Aboyne (b. 1973), who married Sophia Cunningham, daughter of Michael Cunningham, in 2004.
- Lady Amy Jane Gordon (b. 1975)
- Lady Lucy Yoskyl Gordon (b. Jul 1979)

Lord Huntly married secondly in 1991 to Catheryn Milbourn (née Kindersley). The former wife of Robert Lennon Milbourn, she was the eldest daughter of Gay Kindersley (a grandson of Robert Kindersley, 1st Baron Kindersley) and the former Margaret Diana Wakefield (a daughter of Hugh Wakefield of Mayfair, London). The Marchioness is a Patroness of the Royal Caledonian Ball. Together, they were the parents of one daughter:

- Lady Rose Marie-Louise Gordon (b. 1993)

The seat of Lord and Lady Huntly is Aboyne Castle in Aberdeenshire.

== Titles ==
Since 1987, he is:

- 13th Marquess of Huntly (Peerage of Scotland, 1599)
  - 18th Earl of Huntly (Peerage of Scotland, 1445), contested
- 13th Earl of Enzie (Peerage of Scotland, 1599), contested
- 13th Lord Gordon of Badenoch (Peerage of Scotland, 1599), contested
- 9th Earl of Aboyne (Peerage of Scotland, 1660)
- 9th Lord Gordon of Strathavon and Glenlivet (Peerage of Scotland, 1660)
- 5th Baron Meldrum, of Morven in the county of Aberdeen (Peerage of United Kingdom, 1815)

Peerage of Scotland
Preceded by Douglas Gordon	Marquess of Huntly; 1987–present	Incumbent
Orders of precedence in the United Kingdom
Preceded by The Marquess of Winchester	United Kingdom Order of Precedence gentlemen	Succeeded by The Marquess of Queensberry
