= John Gordon, 3rd Earl of Aboyne =

John Gordon, 3rd Earl of Aboyne (April 1700 – 7 April 1732) was the son of Charles Gordon, 2nd Earl of Aboyne and Elizabeth Lyon. He succeeded his father as 3rd Earl of Aboyne in April 1702. On the date of his death 7 April 1732, he was succeeded in his titles by his eldest son. He was just 32 years old.

== Family ==
He married Grace Lockhart, daughter of George Lockhart and Lady Euphemia Montgomerie, on 20 June 1724, and had issue:

1. Charles Gordon, 4th Earl of Aboyne (c1726–1794): by his first wife, Lady Margaret Stewart, daughter of Alexander Stewart, 6th Earl of Galloway and Lady Catherine Cochrane

- Lady Margaret Gordon b. 1760, d. 23 May 1786, married William Thomas Beckford, son of William Beckford and Maria Hamilton, daughter of the Hon. George Hamilton
- George Gordon, 9th Marquess of Huntly b. 28 Jun 1761, d. 17 Jun 1853, married Catherine Cope, daughter of Sir Charles Cope, 2nd Bt. and Catherine Bishopp

by his second wife, Lady Mary Douglas, daughter of James Douglas, 14th Earl of Morton and Agatha Halyburton

- Lord Douglas Halyburton b. 10 Oct 1777, d. 25 Dec 1841, married Louisa Leslie, daughter of Sir Edward Leslie, 1st Baronet

2. Lt.-Col. Hon. John Gordon (1728–1778)

- Major-General John Gordon b. 8 Jul 1765, d. 26 Dec 1832, married Eliza Morris, daughter of Robert Morris
- Grace Margaret Gordon b. 27 Sep 1766, married William Graham

3. Lt.-Col. Hon. Lockhart Gordon (1732–1788), married Catherine (1746–1813), daughter of John Wallop, Viscount Lymington

- Caroline Gordon b. 1772 d. 13 December 1801, married Lt Col. William James, son of Charles James and Catherine Napier, daughter of Sir Gerrard Napier, 5th Baronet
- Reverend Lockhart Gordon
- Loudon Harcourt Gordon

== Notes ==
Peerage of Scotland
Preceded by Charles Gordon	Earl of Aboyne; 1702–1732	Succeeded by Charles Gordon
