= George Gordon, 2nd Marquess of Huntly =

Scottish peer (c. 1592–1649)

George Gordon
- 2nd Marquess of Huntly
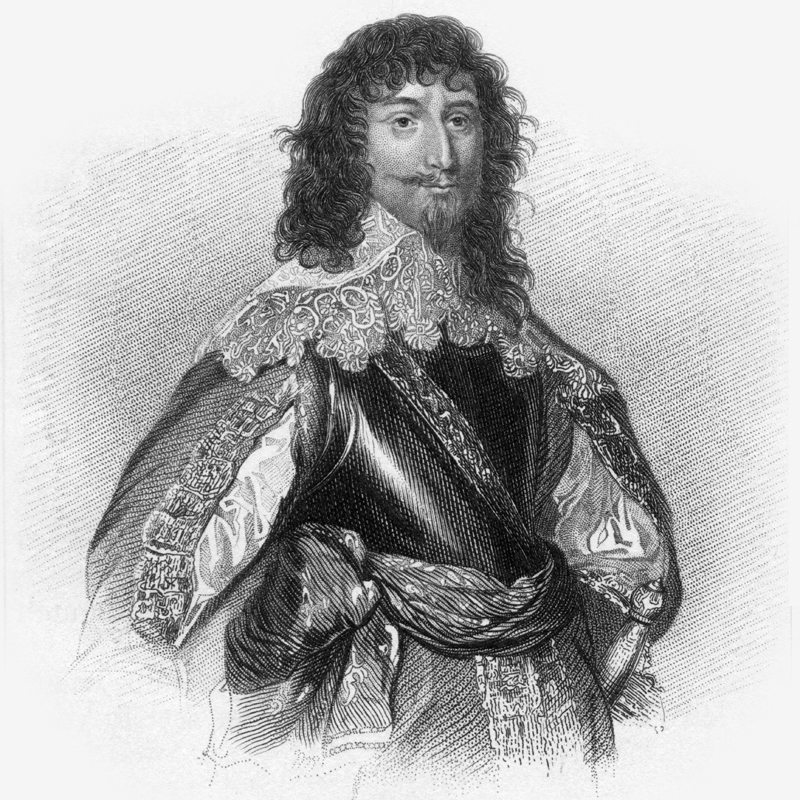
- An engraved portrait of George Gordon from a painting by Anthony van Dyck

Marquess of Huntly
- Tenure: 1636–1649
- Predecessor: George Gordon
- Successor: Lewis Gordon
- Other titles: Viscount Aboyne
- Born: c. 1592; Huntly, Kingdom of Scotland
- Died: 22 March 1649; St Giles Cathedral, Edinburgh, Kingdom of Scotland
- Spouse: Lady Anne Campbell
- Issue: 10, including James, Lewis, and Charles
- Parents: George Gordon, 1st Marquess of Huntly (father); Henrietta Stewart (mother)

George Gordon, 2nd Marquess of Huntly (c. 1592 – March 1649), styled Earl of Enzie from 1599 to 1636, eldest son of George Gordon, 1st Marquess of Huntly by Lady Henrietta Stewart, daughter of Esmé Stewart, 1st Duke of Lennox, born at Huntly Castle, Huntly, Aberdeenshire, in Scotland was brought up in England as a Protestant, and later created Viscount Aboyne by Charles I.

== Life ==
George, Lord Gordon was brought to royal court in Edinburgh February 1596 and in November 1596 at the time of the baptism of Princess Elizabeth as a pledge or hostage for his father's good behaviour, and to be brought up in the Protestant religion and taught by Robert Rollock. In July 1602 Anne of Denmark suggested he should marry a sister of the Earl of Moray, one of her ladies-in-waiting, possibly Margaret Stewart. A committee of arbitrators in the feud between Huntly and Moray, called the "4 Stewarts" advised he marry a daughter of the Earl of Argyll, which he later did.

Some of his earlier years, when he was still Lord Gordon, were spent in England at the court of James I, who took care to educate him in the Protestant faith and created him Earl of Enzie. In 1609 he received a commission of justiciary under the great seal against the members of a rebellious society in the north called the "Society of Boys". In 1613, he was employed by his father in connection with a dispute regarding his superiority over a portion of Lochaber, held by Lochiel and the Camerons. A treaty was at last signed between Lochiel and Enzie on 24 March 1618, by which Lochiel, on certain terms, agreed to renounce his rights to several estates under dispute, one of the stipulations being that he should obtain assistance against his old enemies the Mackintoshes.

Enzie had also a private ground of quarrel against Mackintosh on account of his failure to perform certain services for lands held of the earl and his father. Having on this account obtained a decree against him from the privy council, he besieged him in his castle of Culloden, and compelled him to flee southwards, first to Edinburgh and then to England. Enzie cited him to appear before the privy council, and on his failing to appear he was denounced as a rebel. Mackintosh, being at court, appealed to the king, but after Enzie went to London to give his version of the matter in dispute, Mackintosh was ordered to enter himself in ward in the castle of Edinburgh until he should give the earl satisfaction. In 1622 Enzie received a commission from the privy council to proceed against the Earl of Caithness, but before the commission was carried into effect it was superseded by another from the king to proceed on a mission to France. He remained in that country for some years in command of a company of gens d'armes. On 20 April 1632 he was created Viscount of Aboyne. On the death of his father in June 1636 he was still in France, but in October following returned to England along with his wife, his sister Lady Anne, and two sons, and on 23 June 1637 arrived in Strathbogie.

== Covenanter movement ==
Notwithstanding his father's differences with the government, the second Marquess found himself in the enjoyment of the royal favour. He had been educated at court along with Prince Henry and Prince Charles; and as a Protestant episcopalian he was naturally relied on to render the utmost assistance to the government in their policy towards the covenanters. His supreme influence in the north served to balance that of Archibald Campbell, 1st Marquess of Argyll in the west. In 1638 he caused the royal proclamation to be read at the New Aberdeen's mercat cross. At the beginning of the dispute with the king the covenanters sent to him Colonel Robert Monro as their ambassador, offering, if he would cast in his lot with them, not only to make him their leader, but to pay all his debts, which were said to amount to £100,000 sterling. But "to this proposition," says Gordon, "Huntly pave a short and resolute repartee, that his family had risen and stood by the kings of Scotland, and for his part, if the event proved the ruin of the king, he was resolved to lay his life, honours, and estate under the rubbish of the king his ruins". He therefore not only refused to subscribe the covenant, but in September, alone of the other noblemen appointed in the north, accepted the commission of the king to cause the people to subscribe the king's covenant and band.

In 1639, Huntly was secretly appointed the king's lieutenant in the north, and, information reaching him that a gathering of the covenanters was to be held at Turriff on 14 February, he resolved to disperse them, but when Montrose marched to their support with a body of eight hundred men Huntly contented himself with making a demonstration by marching past them in battle array with a force of two thousand men, without "ony kind of offence or inurious word", and immediately afterwards disbanded his troops. As a reason for this indecision, Huntly is stated to have affirmed that he had no warrant from the king to strike the first blow. This is confirmed by Burnet, but Burnet also attributes his indecisive action during the whole covenanting struggle to his astrological studies, by which he had become convinced that neither the king, nor the Hamiltons, nor Montrose (who afterwards opposed the covenanters) would prosper. On this account, though ‘naturally a gallant man,’ says Burnet, ‘he made a poor figure during the whole course of the wars’.

At the beginning it is, however, evident that he was insufficiently supported from the south, and though inclined to do what he could for the king, he was not disposed to run too great risks. He had been promised the assistance of five thousand men under Hamilton, but they failed to make their appearance, and the covenanters displayed such energy that Huntly on 15 March sent commissioners to treat with Montrose. The answer of Montrose was unsatisfactory, and Huntly, having caused his lieutenancy to be proclaimed at the cross of Aberdeen, began to collect his forces at Inverurie. Meanwhile, he again sent commissioners to Montrose, but before their return he had disbanded his followers and retired to Stathbogie. Aberdeen, having been thus wholly abandoned, was entered by Montrose without opposition on 30 March. On 1 April Montrose and Leslie set out for Inverurie with "resolution to discusse and find out Huntly". There they remained "upon free quarter," allowing their men to rifle, or, according to a term now introduced by Leslie and his soldiers into the English language from the German, to ‘plunder’ the houses of those who had fled. Huntly, who had retired to the Bog of Gight, deeming further resistance to be meanwhile vain, sent commissioners to request an interview with Montrose. This took place at the village of Lewes in Fyvie on 5 April, when Huntly, though not subscribing the covenant, agreed to throw no hindrance in the way of his followers doing so, and engaged that those who had scruples in signing should enter into an obligation to maintain the laws and liberties of Scotland.

He was then permitted to return to Strathbogie, Montrose retiring to Aberdeen. Soon afterwards a meeting of the covenanting leaders was held at Aberdeen for the settlement of the north. On being summoned to the meeting Huntly agreed to attend it on receiving a safe-condnct, guaranteeing that he should be at full liberty to return home after the conference was over. This was granted him by Montrose, probably in good faith, but, apparently overborne by the clamour of the Frasers, the Forbeses, the Crichtons, and other sworn enemies of Huntly, he contrived to find excuses for arresting him, notwithstanding his safe-conduct. On the evening of 11 April he invited Huntly and his sons to supper, and there hinted to him the advisability of his resigning the lieutenandry, and also writing favourably to the king of the covenanters as good and loyal subjects. Huntly readily agreed, but perhaps Montrose suspected that he was only temporising, for that evening guards were placed at his lodging to prevent his escape. On the morrow he had another interview with Montrose, who now solicited his aid in defraying the expenses of the expedition, and also required him to take steps to apprehend James Grant and others who had opposed the covenanters. Huntly declined to comply with either of these demands, and when he was further requested to take his hereditary enemy Crichton of Frendraught by the hand, he declared that this last he would do on no condition whatever. Montrose then ingenuously asked him if he had any objection to accompany him to Edinburgh, and on Huntly confessing that he would rather not, expressed the opinion that it would be well for him to do it. Huntly then demanded back the bond he had signed at Inverurie before he gave an answer, and on receiving it asked whether he wished him to go south as a captive or as a volunteer. ‘Make your choice,’ said Montrose. ‘Then,’ said Huntly, ‘I will not go as a captive, but as a volunteer’. Huntly, accordingly, with his two eldest sons accompanied Montrose to Edinburgh ‘under a guard, though not disarmed or a prisoner’. On his arrival in Edinburgh an attempt was made by the leaders of the covenanters to induce him to sign the covenant, ‘very honourable terms being offered him,’ but to their demand he gave a written refusal, dated 20 April, and afterwards published, which concluded with these words: "For my oune pairt, I am in your power, and resolved not to leave that foule title of traitor as ane inheritance upon my posteritye. Yow may tacke my heade from my shoulders, but not my heart from my soveraigne".

In accordance with the first article of the treaty of Berwick, on 20 June of the same year he received his liberty, and immediately with his son proceeded southwards to the king's camp, where he remained till the king's departure for London on 29 July. Returning to Edinburgh, Huntly remained for some time with his three daughters in a lodging in the Canongate, and at the ensuing parliament he signed the covenant; but after the festivities connected with the marriage of two of his daughters were over, he gave up his house in the Canongate and joined the king in England. While Huntly was confined in the castle of Edinburgh, the Gordons, encouraged by the rumours of the king's advance towards Scotland, began to plunder the covenanters, and, having convened all the inhabitants of Turriff, compelled them to sign the king's covenant; but shortly afterwards the minister of Turriff convened the inhabitants, and, after causing them to crave public pardon for their breach of the covenant, absolved them from their oath and subscription of the covenant of the king. After Huntly had gone to England, his second son, James Gordon, second Viscount Aboyne, endeavoured to uphold the cause of the king in his father's territories, but was routed by Montrose at the Battle of the Brig of Dee, 19 June 1639, after a fiercely fought two-day battle. In 1640, Huntly's lands were plundered, and his castle of Strathbogie taken by General Monro, who placed a garrison in it.

== Charles I ==
In 1641 Huntly accompanied Charles I to Scotland, and in the procession to the parliament rode after the lord high commissioner, but as he refused to subscribe the covenant he was debarred from taking part in the deliberations. He was nominated one of the king's privy councillors, but his name was subsequently deleted by the estates. On the king's departure for London he attended him to Berwick. On 1 January 1642 he arrived at Aberdeen on his way to Strathbogie, having been absent from his own territory since April 1639. He now found his affairs in so ruinous a condition that on the advice of his friends he renounced the estate to his son Lord Gordon, for the payment of his debts and provision of his children, reserving to himself the sum of 10,000 merks of yearly rent, with his castle of Strathbogie and his house in Old Aberdeen. In August 1643, he was summoned to appear before a convention of the estates at Edinburgh, and failing to do so he was denounced and registered at the horn. He therefore wrote, sending apologies for his non-appearance, but they were rejected, and when he offered to retire to France, a license was refused him. On 20 December 1643 he was visited in the Bog of Gight by a deputation of ministers sent to require him to subscribe the covenant, but this he declined. In the following January the sheriff principal of Aberdeen was directed to secure his apprehension, but declined to do so on the plea that the Bog of Gight was outside his jurisdiction. The duty was then transferred to the sheriff of Banff, but on his appearing at the Bog of Gight Huntly refused to recognise his commission.

== Hiding ==
Huntly was apparently inclined to peace, but the action of the government drove him to assume hostilities in self-defence. On 19 March 1643-4 a band of his followers "came galloping through the Old Town to New Aberdeen," and taking the provost and other magistrates prisoners, brought them to Strathbogie. On 16 March Huntly had published a declaration protesting that any acts of hostility he might commit were in self-defence, and on the 20th explained that his reason for seizing the provost and other magistrates was that they ‘were well known to have been scandalous fomenters of a dangerous distraction’. On the 24th he entered the city at the head of 240 horse, and on the 28th plundered the town of its arms and ammunition. Before leaving the city he drew up a band disclaiming the covenant, and binding all who signed it to the service of the king against the covenanters. A party of his followers afterwards made an attack on the town of Montrose, but retreated northwards to Aberdeen on the approach of the forces of the covenanters under Argyll. Huntly, notwithstanding the resolute words of his own band, did not await Argyll's appearance, but, though urged by his followers to give battle, left the city on the last day of April, ‘contrary to the expectation of many’.

On Sunday 12 May 1644 his excommunication was read from the pulpit of Old Aberdeen. Argyll then advanced into his territories, but already Huntly had disbanded his followers, and shut himself up in Auchindown. Learning Argyll's approach he went to the Bog of Gight, and, having taken a supply of gold and silver and other necessaries, crossed over to Sutherlandshire in a boat. He then rode to Caithness, and went by sea to Strathnaver, where he remained till 5 October 1645. During his absence Argyll marched to Strathbogie and spoiled his lands. Huntly's sudden collapse and flight was not altogether occasioned by the advance of Argyll, but by disinclination to co-operate with his old enemy Montrose, who had now joined the king's party, and had been appointed lieutenant-general of the forces in Scotland. "The Marquis of Huntly," said Gordon, "could never be got to join cordially" with Montrose, "or swallow that indignity", and Guthry affirms that Huntly "did his utmost to spoil the business in Montrose's hands".

But Huntly's conduct was entirely passive. On the appearance of Montrose in Strathbogie the Gordons withdrew before him, and as all his efforts to open up communication with Huntly himself were vain, it was impossible to induce them to join the standard of the king. After the defeat of Montrose at Philiphaugh (13 September 1645), Huntly, who had some time previously returned to his territories, raised a force of sixteen hundred foot and six hundred horse, with which he stormed Aberdeen; but with his usual indecision he soon returned again to Strathbogie. In December of the same year Charles sent Robert Leslie, brother of General David Leslie, to Huntly, informing him of his desire to escape from the Scots army to the north, and asking him to levy a force to maintain his cause. This Huntly proceeded to do, but his preparations were to no purpose, as the king remained a prisoner in England. Huntly was excepted from the general pardon of 12 March 1647, and a reward of £1,000 was offered for his apprehension. General David Leslie was despatched against him, and on his approach Huntly fled to the Lochaber mountains.

== Capture ==
After evading pursuit for several months by constantly changing his hiding-place, he was at last, in December, captured by Lieutenant-colonel Menzies at midnight, as he was retiring to bed, at Delnabo in Strathavon. The capture was effected after a severe struggle with the ten gentlemen and servants who were in attendance on him, six of whom were slain in their efforts to defend him. On the news of his capture becoming known, about five hundred men under Grant of Carron assembled to effect his rescue, but Menzies, for greater security, carried him to the castle of Blairfindie in Glenlivet. Huntly, on learning their intentions, also sent them a message, dissuading them from the enterprise. When news of his capture reached the committee of estates, it was debated whether he should be immediately executed or reprieved till the meeting of parliament, and the latter motion was carried by one vote. After remaining two days at Leith, he was delivered up to the magistrates of Edinburgh, and sent to the Tolbooth. There he remained till 22 March 1649, when by order of the Scots parliament he was beheaded on the block at the Market Cross of Edinburgh on the Royal Mile.

On being asked by one of the Presbyterian ministers who attended him whether he wished to be absolved from the sentence of excommunication that had been passed against him, he answered "that as he was not accustomed to give ear to false prophets, he did not wish to be troubled by him." Although he refused to admit that he had acted contrary to the laws, or had done anything to deserve death, he declared that he freely forgave those who had voted for his death. His body was brought to Seton, and was interred in the burial-place of that family.

== Family ==
By his wife, Lady Anna Campbell, eldest daughter of Archibald Campbell, 7th Earl of Argyll, he had five sons and five daughters, including:

- Lord George Gordon, killed at the battle of Alford in 1645.
- James Gordon, 2nd Viscount Aboyne (d. 1649).
- Lewis Gordon, 3rd Marquess of Huntly, who succeeded as third Marquess, and was the father of George, fourth Marquess,

These three older sons all distinguished themselves in the defence of the royal cause.

- Charles Gordon, was in 1660 created Earl of Aboyne by Charles II
- Henry Gordon, who distinguished himself in the service of Poland.
- Anne Gordon was married to the third Earl of Perth.
- Henrietta Gordon, first to George, Lord Seton, secondly to John, second Earl of Traquair.
- Alexander Gordon, (b.1642) married to Jane Robinson
- Jean Gordon, married to Thomas Hamilton, 2nd Earl of Haddington.
- Mary Gordon, married to Alexander Irvine of Drum.
- Catherine Gordon became a lady-in-waiting to Marie Louise Gonzaga, Queen of Poland, consort of both brothers Kings Władysław IV Vasa and John II Casimir Vasa.; married to Jan Andrzej Morsztyn with whom she had descendants including their great-grandson Stanisław II Augustus of Poland

== Ancestry ==
Ancestors of George Gordon, 2nd Marquess of Huntly

8. George Gordon, 4th Earl of Huntly
4. George Gordon, 5th Earl of Huntly
9. Elizabeth Keith, Countess of Huntly
2. George Gordon, 1st Marquess of Huntly
10. James Hamilton, Duke of Châtellerault
5. Anne Hamilton, Countess of Huntly
11. Lady Margaret Douglas
George Gordon, 2nd Marquess of Huntly
12. John Stewart, 5th Lord of Aubigny
6. Esmé Stewart, 1st Duke of Lennox
13. Anne de La Queuille
3. Lady Henrietta Stewart
14. Guillaume de Balzac, Lord of Entragues & Saint-Amand
7. Catherine de Balzac
15. Louise d'Humières

Peerage of Scotland
Preceded by George Gordon	Marquess of Huntly; 1636–1649	Succeeded by Lewis Gordon
New creation	Viscount Aboyne; 1632–1636	Succeeded by James Gordon
