= Charles Gordon, 2nd Earl of Aboyne =

Charles Gordon, 2nd Earl of Aboyne (c. 1670 – April 1702). The eldest son of Charles Gordon, 1st Earl of Aboyne and Elizabeth Lyon, he succeeded his father as 2nd Earl of Aboyne in March 1681. At the time of his death in April 1702, he was succeeded in his titles by his son.

== Family ==
He married Elizabeth Lyon, daughter of Patrick Lyon, 3rd Earl of Strathmore and Kinghorne and Helen Middleton, c1662, and had issue:

- Lady Helen Gordon (d. c1731), married George Kinnaird
- John Gordon, 3rd Earl of Aboyne (d. 1732)
- Lady Elizabeth Gordon (d. 1770)
- Lady Grizel Gordon (d. 1761), married James Grant

Peerage of Scotland
Preceded by Charles Gordon	Earl of Aboyne; 1681–1702	Succeeded by John Gordon
