= Lewis Gordon, 3rd Marquess of Huntly =

Scottish nobleman (c. 1626–1653)

Lewis Gordon, 3rd Marquess of Huntly (c. 1626–1653) was a Scottish nobleman. He was the third son of George Gordon, 2nd Marquess of Huntly.

== Biography ==
Born when his father was commander of the Garde Écossaise, he was named after Louis XIII of France, and brought up until the age of ten by his grandfather, George Gordon, 1st Marquess of Huntly. From an early age, he showed himself to be a reckless romantic – while still a child, he stole some jewels and attempted to take ship to Holland, presumably to join the army. When he was thirteen, the First Bishops' War broke out, and the young nobleman sneaked out of Gordon Castle (one account says he climbed over the wall) and hurried to the Highlands, where he raised a brigade of clansmen from his father's estates to fight the Covenanters. His first experience of war was at Megray Hill, where his Highlanders scattered in the face of enemy cannon fire.

Following the peace, Lord Lewis travelled to France, where he enlisted as an ordinary pikeman in an infantry regiment, in order to learn his soldiering from the ground up. After three years, he traveled to England, working his way north by serving on both sides in the English Civil War, first in the royalist army and then in the Scottish Covenanter forces of his uncle, the Earl of Argyll, the same army he had fought against in 1639.

Eventually returning home, the sixteen-year-old nobleman seduced and married Mary Grant, the fiancée of his absent elder brother, Viscount Aboyne. He served on both sides in the Scottish Civil War, playing an important role in his father's occupation of Aberdeen in 1646, where he engaged an enemy cavalry commander in single combat and then storming the town. Going into exile after the defeat of the royalists, he traveled again to France; in rapid succession, he succeeded his brother and father as Earl of Enzie and Marquess of Huntly, and by 1651, he was allowed to return to Scotland, even though he refused to conform to the Presbyterian Church of Scotland (he was probably a Roman Catholic).

In 1645 Lord Lewis attacked Brodie Castle in Moray and setting it afire destroyed important archives and documents detailing the origins of the illustrious Clan Brodie. This despicable act secured Clan Brodie's place among the great mysteries of Scotland.

He died aged 26 or 27, leaving a young widow (whom he had apparently converted to Catholicism), three daughters, and a four-year-old son who would eventually become the 1st Duke of Gordon. Miles Gourdon, a cavalry commander in the French army known as the chevalier or count of "Crolis", was perhaps an illegitimate son, as he is said to have been a brother of the duke.

His reputation among historians has varied; he is the clearest hero in the Civil War narrative of his kinsman Patrick Gordon of Ruthven, while John Buchan regarded him as wild and headstrong to the point of insanity.

== Bibliography ==
- "Gordon, George (d.1649)" . Dictionary of National Biography. London: Smith, Elder & Co. 1885–1900.
- "Gordon, Marquis of Huntly", in The Scots Peerage, ed. Sir James Balfour Paul (9 vols, 1904–1914), vol. iv. p. 548
- Buchan, John, Montrose – A History (1928)
- Gordon, Patrick, A Short Abridgement of Britane's Distemper (1844)

Peerage of Scotland
Preceded by George Gordon	Marquess of Huntly; 1649 – 1653	Succeeded by George Gordon
