= Charles Gordon, 1st Earl of Aboyne =

Charles Gordon, 1st Earl of Aboyne (c1638 – March 1681). The fourth son of George Gordon, 2nd Marquess of Huntly and Lady Anne Campbell, he was created 1st Earl of Aboyne and 1st Lord Gordon of Strathaven and Glenlivet by Letters Patent on 10 September 1660. At the time of his death in March 1681, he was succeeded in the earldom and lordship by his son.

== Family ==
He married firstly, Margaret Irvine, daughter of Alexander Irvine, c1662, and had issue:

- Lady Ann Gordon (d. c1665)

His first wife died in 1662.

He married secondly, Elizabeth Lyon, daughter of John Lyon, 2nd Earl of Kinghorne and Lady Elizabeth Maule, on 28 August 1665, and had issue:

- Charles Gordon, 2nd Earl of Aboyne (c1670-1702)
- Hon. George Gordon
- Hon. John Gordon (d.1762)
- Lady Elizabeth Gordon, married John Mackenzie, 2nd Earl of Cromartie (1685)

Peerage of Scotland
New creation	Earl of Aboyne; 1660–1681	Succeeded by Charles Gordon
