= James Stewart, the Black Knight of Lorn =

Scottish nobleman

James Stewart, the Black Knight of Lorne (c. 1399 – c. 1451) was a Scottish nobleman.

== Early life ==
The Black Knight of Lorne was born in Innermeath, Scotland. His father was Sir John Stewart (died 26 April 1421), Scotland's ambassador to England. He was a direct male-line descendant of Alexander Stewart, 4th High Steward of Scotland, through his second son Sir John Stewart of Bonkill, who was killed at the Battle of Falkirk. His mother was Isabell MacDougall, daughter of John Gallda MacDougall and Joanna Isaac. Joanna Isaac was the daughter of Sir Thomas Isaac and Matilda de Brus, Princess of Scotland, who was the daughter of Elizabeth de Burgh and Robert the Bruce.

== Political career ==
James was a younger brother of Robert Stewart, 1st Lord Lorne (1382–1449), whose descendants bore this title. He was an ally of the Black Douglases, Earls of Douglas. After the murder of James I of Scotland in 1437, power was held by Archibald Douglas, 5th Earl of Douglas as regent for the underage James II of Scotland. The Stewarts of Lorne were amongst his most trusted supporters, and their power greatly increased while the Douglas family controlled Scotland and the king was a mere 7 years of age. However, the unexpected death of the 5th Earl of Douglas from a fever in 1439 saw power now being uneasily shared between William, 1st Lord Crichton, Chancellor of Scotland and Sir Alexander Livingston, Governor of Stirling Castle.

Stewart married Joan Beaufort, the queen consort, and became stepfather to James II. Stewart and his Douglas allies planned to remove the young James II, who was being held by Livingston in his stronghold of Stirling Castle. However, Livingston arrested Lady Joan on 3 Aug 1439, imprisoning her in Stirling Castle, while throwing Sir James and his brother Sir William into its dungeon. They were later released on good behaviour. Stewart was given safe conduct to England in 1445, 1447 and 1451.

He was supposedly captured at sea by Flemish pirates and put to death after 1451. But he was still alive in 1453–54, when he carried King James II's offer to Joan’s brother Edmund Beaufort, Duke of Somerset to rescue him from the Tower of London, when Somerset was a prisoner during the regency of Richard Duke of York.

== Family ==
He married, before 21 September 1439, Joan Beaufort, Queen of Scots, Queen Consort of Scotland and widow of James I of Scotland. They had a papal dispensation for both consanguinity and affinity. She was the daughter of John Beaufort, 1st Earl of Somerset (son of Katherine Swynford and John of Gaunt, and a grandson of Edward III of England) and Lady Margaret Holland, daughter of Thomas Holland, 2nd Earl of Kent and Alice FitzAlan.

James Stewart and Joan Beaufort had three children:

- John Stewart, 1st Earl of Atholl
- James Stewart, Earl of Buchan, d. 1499. Married 27 March 1459, to Margaret Ogilvy, daughter of Alexander Ogilvy of Auchterhouse.
- Andrew Stewart, c. 1443 – 1501. The Bishop of Moray from 1483 to 1501.

== Sources ==
1. Sir James Stewart of Lorn at the peerage.com
2. Alison Weir, Britain's Royal Family: A Complete Genealogy (London, UK: The Bodley Head, 1999), page 230. Hereinafter cited as Britain's Royal Family.
3. Bruce A. McAndrew, Scotland's Historic Heraldry (Woodbridge, Suffolk, UK: Boydell Press, 2006) page 205
4. Edward Kimber & John Almon, The Peerage of Scotland (London, UK: Piccadilly, 1767), page 340.
