= Charles Gordon, 11th Marquess of Huntly =

Scottish Liberal politician

The Most Honourable The Marquess of Huntly PC DL JP
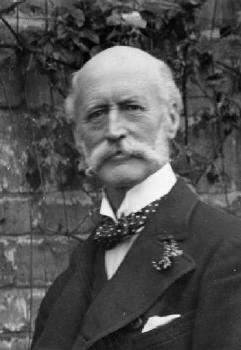

Captain of the Honourable Corps of Gentlemen-at-Arms
- In office 21 January 1881 – 27 June 1881
- Monarch: Victoria
- Prime Minister: William Ewart Gladstone
- Preceded by: The Earl Fife
- Succeeded by: The Lord Carrington

Personal details
- Born: 5 March 1847 Orton Longueville, near Peterborough
- Died: 20 February 1937 (aged 89) Orton Longueville
- Party: Liberal
- Spouse(s): Amy Brooks (d. 1920); Charlotte Fallon (d. 1939)
- Education: Trinity College, Cambridge

Charles Gordon, 11th Marquess of Huntly, PC, DL, JP (5 March 1847 – 20 February 1937), styled Lord Strathavon until 1853 and Earl of Aboyne between 1853 and 1863, was a Scottish Liberal politician. He served under William Ewart Gladstone, he was appointed Captain of the Honourable Corps of Gentlemen-at-Arms between January and June 1881.

== Background and education ==
Huntly was the son of Charles Gordon, 10th Marquess of Huntly, by his second wife Maria Antoinette, daughter of the Reverend Peter William Pegus, and succeeded to the marquessate in 1863 at the age of sixteen. He was educated at Eton and Trinity College, Cambridge.

== Political career ==
In 1870 Huntly was appointed a Lord-in-waiting (government whip in the House of Lords) in the first Liberal administration of William Ewart Gladstone, a post he held until 1873, and served from January to June 1881 as Captain of the Honourable Corps of Gentlemen-at-Arms (government chief whip in the House of Lords) in Gladstone's second administration. In 1881 he was sworn in the Privy Council.

Apart from his political career, Lord Huntly was Lord Rector of the University of Aberdeen between 1890, 1893 and 1896. He also published Auld Acquaintances and Milestones and edited Records of Aboyne. He was also a member of Huntingdonshire County Council.

== Family ==
Lord Huntly married firstly Amy, daughter of Sir William Cunliffe Brooks, 1st Baronet, in 1869. After her death in 1920 he married secondly Charlotte Isabella, daughter of John H. Fallon and widow of James McDonald, in 1922. Both marriages were childless. Huntly died in February 1937, aged 89, and was succeeded in the marquessate by his great-nephew, Douglas Gordon. The Marchioness of Huntly died in May 1939.

Political offices
Preceded by The Earl Fife	Captain of the Honourable Corps of Gentlemen-at-Arms; 1881	Succeeded by The Lord Carrington
Peerage of Scotland
Preceded by Charles Gordon	Marquess of Huntly; 1863–1937	Succeeded by Douglas Gordon
