= Lord John Stewart =

Scottish aristocrat (1621–1644)

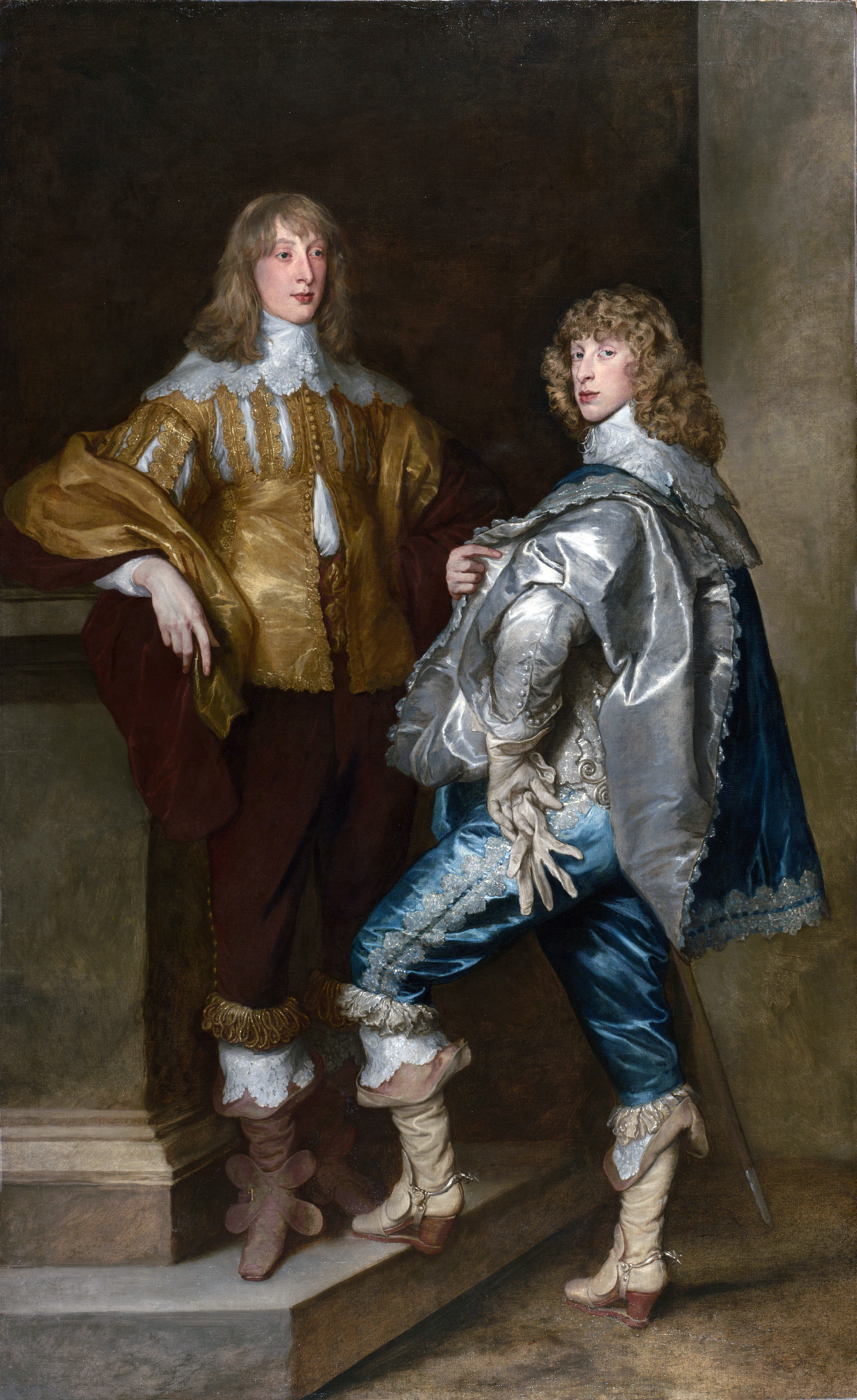
- Lord John Stewart (left), pictured with his younger brother Lord Bernard Stewart (1623-1645). Lord John Stuart and his Brother, Lord Bernard Stuart, c. 1638, by Sir Anthony van Dyck, National Gallery
- Born: 23 October 1621
- Died: 29 March 1644 (aged 22); Hampshire, England
- Parents: Esmé Stewart (father); Katherine Clifton (mother)
- Relatives: James Stewart (brother); George Stewart (brother); Bernard Stewart (brother); Charles Stewart (nephew); Esmé Stewart (grandfather)

Lord John Stewart (23 October 1621 – 29 March 1644) was a Scottish aristocrat who served as a Royalist commander in the English Civil War. He was one of six sons of Esmé Stewart, 3rd Duke of Lennox and his wife Katherine Clifton, 2nd Baroness Clifton, and the brother of James Stewart, 1st Duke of Richmond.

With his youngest brother, Lord Bernard Stewart, he embarked on a three-year tour of the continent in 1639, before returning to join the King's cause in the Civil War as a General. He was killed on 29 March 1644 at the Battle of Cheriton near New Alresford in Hampshire.

Only one of his brothers, Lodovic, survived the war to see the restoration of the monarchy in 1660.

== Bibliography ==
- Chisholm, Hugh, ed. (1911). "Lennox" . Encyclopædia Britannica. Vol. 16 (11th ed.). Cambridge University Press. pp. 419–420.
- "Commentary on the portrait by Van Dyck". National Portrait Gallery. Archived from the original on 7 May 2009.
- "Burke's Peerage & Gentry, 107th edition".
