= Mary Villiers =

Mary Villiers may refer to:

- Mary Villiers, Countess of Buckingham (c. 1570–1632)
- Mary Villiers, Duchess of Buckingham (1638–1704)
- Mary Stewart, Duchess of Richmond (1622–1685), formerly Lady Mary Villiers
- Mary Villiers, Lady Herbert of Shurland, a c. 1636 oil painting by Anthony van Dyck of Mary Stewart, Duchess of Richmond
