= George Stewart, 9th Seigneur d'Aubigny =

Scottish nobleman and royalist military commander (1618–1642)

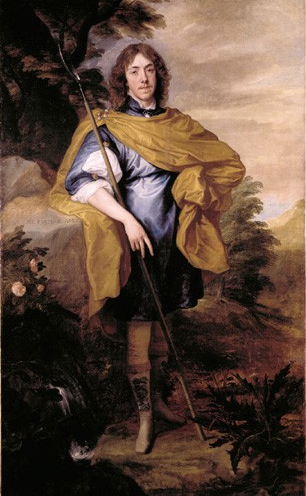
- George Stewart, 9th Seigneur d'Aubigny, dressed as a shepherd. 1638 portrait, inscribed in Latin Me Firmior Amor ("love is stronger than me"), by Anthony van Dyck, National Portrait Gallery, London

Personal details
- Born: 17 July 1618
- Died: 23 October 1642 (aged 24); Edge Hill, Warwickshire
- Spouse: Katherine Howard (m. 1638)
- Children: 2, including Charles
- Parents: Esmé Stewart (father); Katherine Clifton (mother)
- Relatives: James Stewart (brother); Bernard Stewart (brother); James Hamilton (brother); George Hamilton (brother); Esmé Stewart (grandfather); Charles I of England (cousin)
- Education: Collège de Navarre

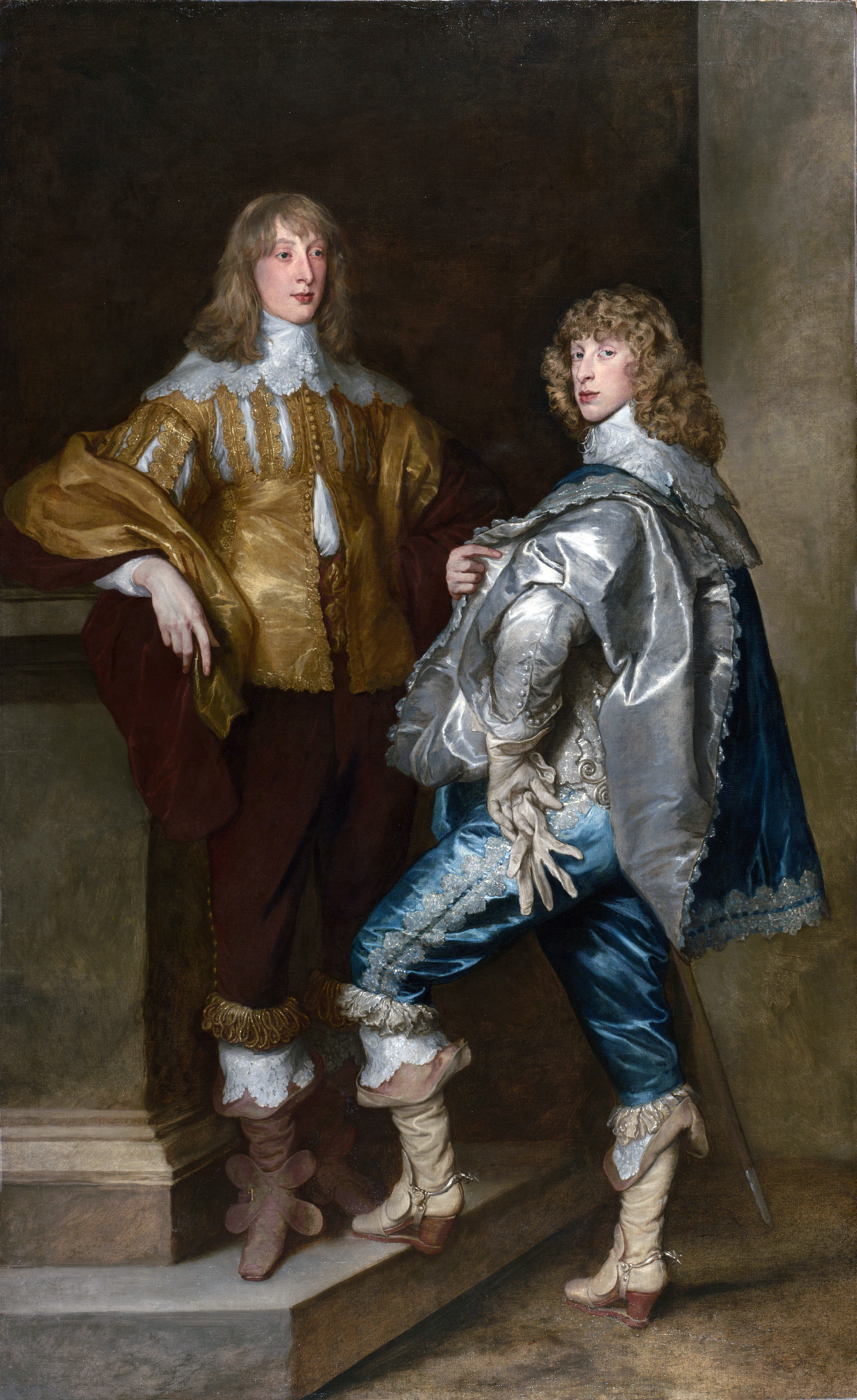
Younger brothers of Lord George Stewart, who also died as young men during the Civil War supporting the Royalist cause, left: Lord John Stewart (1621–1644), died aged 23 and right: Lord Bernard Stewart (1623–1645), died aged 22. Lord John Stuart and his Brother, Lord Bernard Stuart, c. 1638, by Sir Anthony van Dyck, National Gallery, London

Lord George Stewart (or Stuart), 9th Seigneur d'Aubigny (17 July 1618 – 23 October 1642) was an Anglo-Scottish nobleman of French descent and a third cousin of King Charles I of England. He supported that king during the Civil War as a Royalist commander and was killed, aged 24, at the Battle of Edgehill in 1642.

== Origins ==
He was the 3rd son of Esmé Stewart, 3rd Duke of Lennox (1579–1624), 7th Seigneur d'Aubigny, by his wife Katherine Clifton, 2nd Baroness Clifton (c.1592–1637). His eldest brother was James Stewart, 1st Duke of Richmond, 4th Duke of Lennox (1612–1655) of Cobham Hall in Kent.

== Youth in France ==
His father died of spotted fever when George was aged 6 and he became a ward of his cousin King Charles I of England. He was brought up (with his elder brother Henry and younger brother Ludovic) at the Château d'Aubigny in the parish of Aubigny-sur-Nère in the ancient province of Berry in France, as a Roman Catholic, under the charge of his paternal grandmother, Katherine de Balsac (d.1631/2), Dowager Duchess of Lennox, widow of Esmé Stewart, 1st Duke of Lennox, 1st Earl of Lennox (1542–1583).

Esmé Stewart, 1st Duke of Lennox was the favourite of the young King James I & VI (and a first cousin of that king's father Henry Stewart, Lord Darnley), who in 1579 had returned to Scotland from his French origins at Aubigny and was showered with honours by the young Scottish king, from 1603 also King of England. The Château d'Aubigny and the lordship of that manor (Seigneurie d'Aubigny) was first acquired by his distant relative Sir John Stewart of Darnley, 1st Comte d'Évreux (c.1380–1429), a Scottish nobleman and famous military commander who served as Constable of the Scottish Army in France, supporting the French against the English during the Hundred Years War, and a fourth cousin of King James I of Scotland (reigned 1406 to 1437), the third monarch of the House of Stewart.

== Career ==
In 1632, at the age of 14, he inherited the Seigneurie d'Aubigny (lordship of the manor of Aubigny-sur-Nère), following the death of his 17-year-old elder brother Henry Stewart (1616–1632), who died in Venice. By 1633 he was a student at the Collège de Navarre, part of the University of Paris. He did homage to Louis XIII for the lordship of Aubigny on 5 August 1636, shortly after his eighteenth birthday. Later that year he moved to England.

He fought with the French against the Spanish in the Battle of Montjuïc (1641). As civil war loomed in England, Stewart joined the forces of King Charles at York where he was knighted on 18 April 1642 along with his brother Bernard.

== Death, burial & succession ==
He was mortally wounded during the first engagement of the Battle of Edgehill on Sunday 23 October 1642, aged 24. Also killed later during the Civil War fighting for the Royalist cause were his two younger brothers Lord John Stewart (1621–1644) and Lord Bernard Stewart (1623–1645), the famous Van Dyck double-portrait of whom – the iconic image of Cavaliers – survives in the National Gallery, London.

George Stewart was buried in Christ Church Cathedral, Oxford. The lordship of Aubigny passed to his next brother, Ludovic Stewart (d. 1665).

== Marriage and children ==
In 1638, at the age of 20 and secretly, he married Katherine Howard (d. 1650), a daughter of Theophilus Howard, 2nd Earl of Suffolk, without her father's consent, thus offending his guardian the king. The surviving portrait of George Stewart by Anthony van Dyck, now in the National Portrait Gallery, London, may have been painted to mark his marriage; the Latin inscription Me Firmior Amor ("love is stronger than me") may allude to his conflicting loyalties. His wife survived him and remarried to James Levingston, 1st Earl of Newburgh, and following the defeat of the Royalists both were suspected in 1648 of plotting to rescue the exiled King Charles I and on the discovery of the supposed plot fled to the Netherlands where Katherine died in 1650. By Newburgh she had one further child, Elizabeth Levingston. By his wife George Stewart had two children:

- Charles Stewart, 3rd Duke of Richmond, 6th Duke of Lennox (1638–1672), of Cobham Hall in Kent and of Richmond House in London, last in the male line of the Stewarts of Aubigny, who was the heir of his infant first cousin Esmé Stuart, 2nd Duke of Richmond, 5th Duke of Lennox (1649–1660), the son and heir of James Stewart, 1st Duke of Richmond, 4th Duke of Lennox (1612–1655), of Cobham Hall in Kent. After his death in 1672, childless but having married three times, the titles of Richmond and Lennox (which had merged into the crown respectively in 1485 on the accession of Henry Tudor, Earl of Richmond as King Henry VII of England), and in 1586 on the accession of King James I & VI as King of Scotland (being the heir of his paternal grandfather Matthew Stewart, 4th Earl of Lennox (d.1571)) became available for re-grant by King Charles II, and the French territorial title of Aubigny was also vacant. The Stewarts of Aubigny had been much beloved by the Stuart monarchs and Charles II conferred their titles on his last mistress Louise de Kérouaille and his illegitimate son by her Charles Lennox, 1st Duke of Richmond, 1st Duke of Lennox (1672–1723). At the request of the English king, the French king created Louise Duchesse d'Aubigny in the peerage of France, which title was inherited at her death by her grandson Charles Lennox, 2nd Duke of Richmond, 2nd Duke of Lennox, 2nd Duc d'Aubigny (1701–1750). The titles are still held today by his descendant, seated at Goodwood House in Sussex.
- Katherine Stewart (1640–1702), of Cobham Hall in Kent, heiress of her childless brother, who later inherited via her paternal grandmother the title Baroness Clifton of Leighton Bromswold; the dukedoms passed to male heirs only. She married firstly Henry O'Brien, Lord Ibrackan, and secondly Sir Joseph Williamson.

== Notes ==
French nobility
Preceded by Henry Stewart	Seigneur d'Aubigny; 1632–1642	Succeeded by Ludovic Stewart
