= Esmé Stewart, 3rd Duke of Lennox =

Scottish nobleman (1579–1624)

His Grace The Duke of Lennox KG
- Arms of the Duke of Lennox
- Born: 1579
- Died: 30 July 1624 (aged 44–45); Northamptonshire, England
- Spouse: Katherine Clifton (m. 1609)
- Children: 11, including James, George, John and Bernard
- Father: Esmé Stewart
- Relatives: Ludovic Stewart (brother); Charles Stewart (grandson)

Arms of Esmé Stewart, 3rd Duke of Lennox: Quarterly of 4, 1&4: Arms awarded in 1427 by King Charles VII of France to Sir John Stewart of Darnley, 1st Seigneur d'Aubigny, 1st Seigneur de Concressault and 1st Comte d'Évreux, Constable of the Scottish Army in France: Royal arms of France within a bordure of Bonkyll, for the arms of the de Bonkyll family of Bonkyll Castle in Scotland (whose canting arms were three buckles), ancestors of Stewart of Darnley; 2&3: Stewart of Darnley: Arms of Stewart, Hereditary High Steward of Scotland, a bordure engrailed gules for difference; overall an inescutcheon of Lennox, Earl of Lennox, the heiress of whom was the wife of Sir John Stewart of Darnley

Esmé Stewart, 3rd Duke of Lennox (1579 – 30 July 1624), KG, 7th Seigneur d'Aubigny, lord of the Manor of Cobham, Kent, was a Scottish nobleman and through his paternal lines was a second cousin of King James VI of Scotland and I of England. He was a patron of the playwright Ben Jonson who lived in his household for five years.

== Origins ==
He was the younger son of Esmé Stewart, 1st Duke of Lennox (1542–1583), a Frenchman of Scottish ancestry and a favourite of King James VI of Scotland (of whose father, Henry Stewart, Lord Darnley, he was a first cousin), by his wife Catherine de Balsac (died after 1630), a daughter of Guillaume de Balsac, Sieur d'Entragues, by his wife Louise d'Humières.

== Career ==
On 9 February 1608, he performed in the masque The Hue and Cry After Cupid at Whitehall Palace as a sign of the zodiac, to celebrate the wedding of John Ramsay, Viscount Haddington to Elizabeth Radclyffe.

At the death of his childless elder brother, Ludovic Stewart, 2nd Duke of Lennox, 1st Duke of Richmond (1574–1624), he inherited their paternal title of Duke of Lennox, the Dukedom of Richmond having become extinct. He was by then already Earl of March (in the peerage of England) (1619) and Baron Clifton of Leighton Bromswold (in the right of his wife). He had become the 7th Seigneur d'Aubigny in France when his elder brother surrendered the title following their father's death.

In 1624, the year of his death, he was invested as a Knight of the Garter.

== Marriage and children ==
In 1609, he married Katherine Clifton, 2nd Baroness Clifton, by whom he had eleven children, third cousins of King Charles I, for whom many of them fought and died in the English Civil War:

=== Sons ===
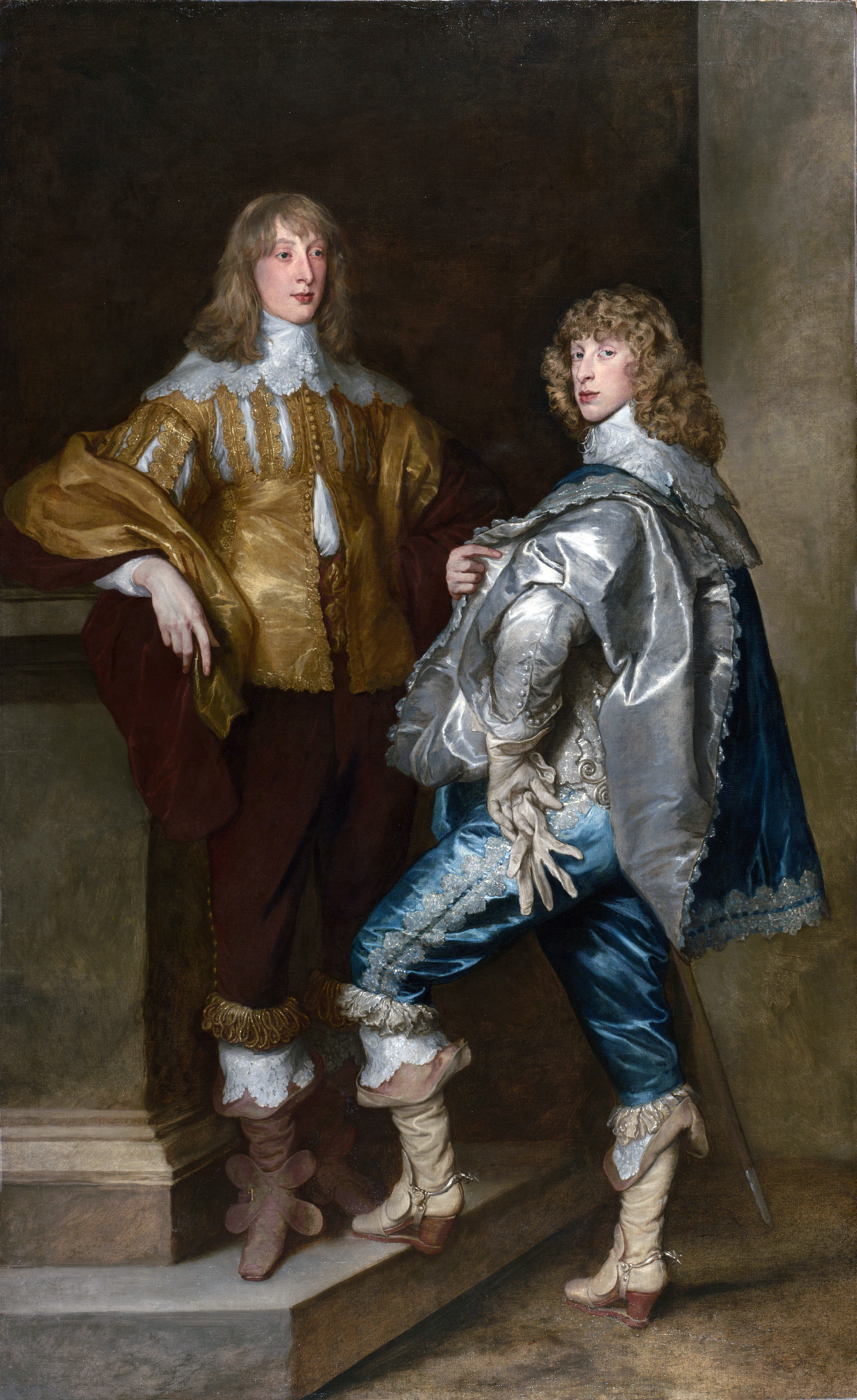
Two of the younger sons of the 3rd Duke of Lennox, who together with their elder brother Lord George Stewart, died as young men during the Civil War supporting the Royalist cause, left: Lord John Stewart (1621–1644), died aged 23 and right: Lord Bernard Stewart (1623–1645), died aged 22. Lord John Stuart and his Brother, Lord Bernard Stuart, c. 1638, by Sir Anthony van Dyck, National Gallery, London

- James Stewart, 4th Duke of Lennox, 1st Duke of Richmond (1612–1655), eldest son and heir. He resided at Cobham Hall in Kent (granted in 1606 to his uncle Ludovic Stewart, 2nd Duke of Lennox, 1st Duke of Richmond (1574–1624), by his second cousin King James VI & I) and served as Lord Warden of the Cinque Ports, based at Dover Castle in Kent;
- Henry Stewart, 8th Seigneur d'Aubigny (1616–1632). He studied in the City of Bourges (the capital of the former province of Berry, in which was situated Aubigny) and later at Paris, then visited Venice with the statesman Richard Weston, 1st Earl of Portland (father of his sister's husband) where he died at age 17, and was buried in the Church of Santi Giovanni e Paolo, Venice;
- Francis Stewart (1616–1617), died in infancy;
- George Stewart, 9th Seigneur d'Aubigny (1618–1642), killed aged 24 fighting for the royalist cause in the English Civil War. He married Katherine Howard (d. 1650), a daughter of Theophilus Howard, 2nd Earl of Suffolk, by whom he was the father of Charles Stewart, 3rd Duke of Richmond, 6th Duke of Lennox (1638–1672), of Cobham Hall and of Richmond House in London, the last in the male line of the Stewarts of Aubigny, who was the heir of his infant first cousin Esmé Stuart, 2nd Duke of Richmond, 5th Duke of Lennox (1649–1660), the son and heir of James Stewart, 1st Duke of Richmond, 4th Duke of Lennox (1612–1655), of Cobham Hall;
- Ludovic Stewart, 11th Seigneur d'Aubigny (1619–1665), a priest who shortly before his death became a cardinal; (Note: Disputed: No such Cardinal nominated by Pope Alexander VII (r. 1655–1667))
- Lord John Stewart (1621–1644) killed aged 23, unmarried, fighting for the royalist cause in the English Civil War;
- Lord Bernard Stewart (1623–1645) killed aged 22, unmarried, fighting for the royalist cause in the English Civil War. For his war services, he was due to be created Earl of Lichfield, but died before the formalities were completed, and the title was instead awarded to his nephew Charles Stewart (1638–1672), later 3rd Duke of Richmond, 6th Duke of Lennox.

=== Daughters ===
- Elizabeth Stewart (1610–1674), who married Henry Howard, 22nd Earl of Arundel
- Anne Stewart (1614–1646), who married Archibald Douglas, Earl of Angus
- Frances Stewart (1617–1694), who married Jerome Weston, 2nd Earl of Portland
- Margaret Stewart (1618–1618), who died young

== Death and burial ==
He died on 30 July 1624 at Kirby Hall, Northamptonshire, of the "spotted ague". He was buried, on 6 August 1624, in Westminster Abbey, in the Richmond Vault in the south-east apsidal chapel of the Chapel of King Henry VII (himself formerly Earl of Richmond).

== Notes ==
Political offices
Preceded by The 3rd Lord St John of Bletso	Lord Lieutenant of Huntingdonshire jointly with The 4th Lord St John of Bletso; 1619–1624	Succeeded by The 4th Lord St John of Bletso; The Viscount Mandeville
Peerage of Scotland
Preceded by Ludovic Stewart	Duke of Lennox; 1624	Succeeded by James Stewart
Peerage of England
New title	Earl of March; 1619–1624	Succeeded by James Stewart
