= Esmé Stewart, 2nd Duke of Richmond =

Scottish duke

Esmé Stewart
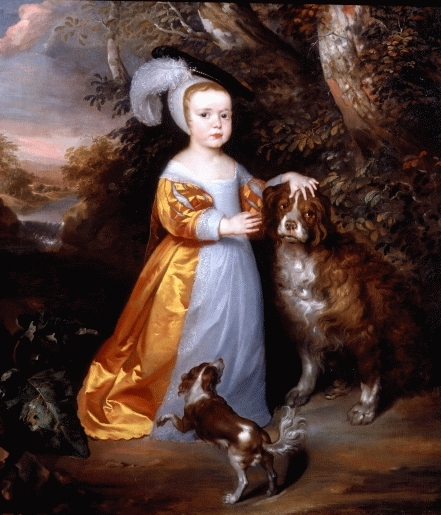
- Esmé Stuart, portrait painted during his father's lifetime, c.1653, by John Weesop

2nd Duke of Richmond, 5th Duke of Lennox
- Predecessor: James Stewart, 1st Duke of Richmond
- Successor: Charles Stewart, 3rd Duke of Richmond
- Born: 2 November 1649
- Died: 10 August 1660 (aged 10); Paris, France
- Buried: 4 September 1660; Westminster Abbey
- Noble family: Stewart
- Father: James Stewart, 1st Duke of Richmond
- Mother: Mary Villiers

Esmé Stuart, 2nd Duke of Richmond, 5th Duke of Lennox (2 November 1649 – 10 August 1660) was the son and heir of James Stewart, 1st Duke of Richmond, 4th Duke of Lennox (1612–1655), of Cobham Hall in Kent, by his wife Mary Villiers (1622–1685), only daughter of George Villiers, 1st Duke of Buckingham.

His father, who had been a loyal supporter of King Charles I during the Civil War, died in 1655, and Esmé and his mother went into exile in France. He died of smallpox in 1660, aged 10, in Paris, when his titles passed to his first-cousin Charles Stewart, 3rd Duke of Richmond, 6th Duke of Lennox (1638–1672).

== Monument ==
He was buried on 4 September 1660 in Westminster Abbey, in the Richmond Vault in the Henry VII Chapel (that king formerly having been Earl of Richmond) above which survives his simple monument comprising a black obelisk set against a wall and standing on four small skulls, surmounted by an urn containing his heart. On the plinth is an incised ducal coronet and the letters "ES RL" (for Esme Stuart, Richmond, Lennox). The Latin inscription may be translated as:

Sacred to his memory. In this urn is enclosed the heart, while below rests the body, of the most illustrious Duke, Esme Stuart. Let him who seeks his parentage know that he inherited from his father James, firstly Duke of Lennox and then of Richmond and Lennox, the same title and rank, while from his mother Mary, only daughter of George, Duke of Buckingham, he derived his life and spirit, which afterwards he breathed out at Paris in the 11th year of his age on 14 (sic, should be 10) day of the month of August, in the year of man's salvation 1660.

Peerage of England
Preceded by James Stewart	Duke of Richmond; 1655–1660	Succeeded by Charles Stewart
Preceded by James Stewart	Baron Clifton; 1655–1660	Succeeded by Mary Butler
Peerage of Scotland
Preceded by James Stewart	Duke of Lennox; 1655–1660	Succeeded by Charles Stewart
