= Lord John Stuart and His Brother, Lord Bernard Stuart =

Painting by Anthony van Dyck

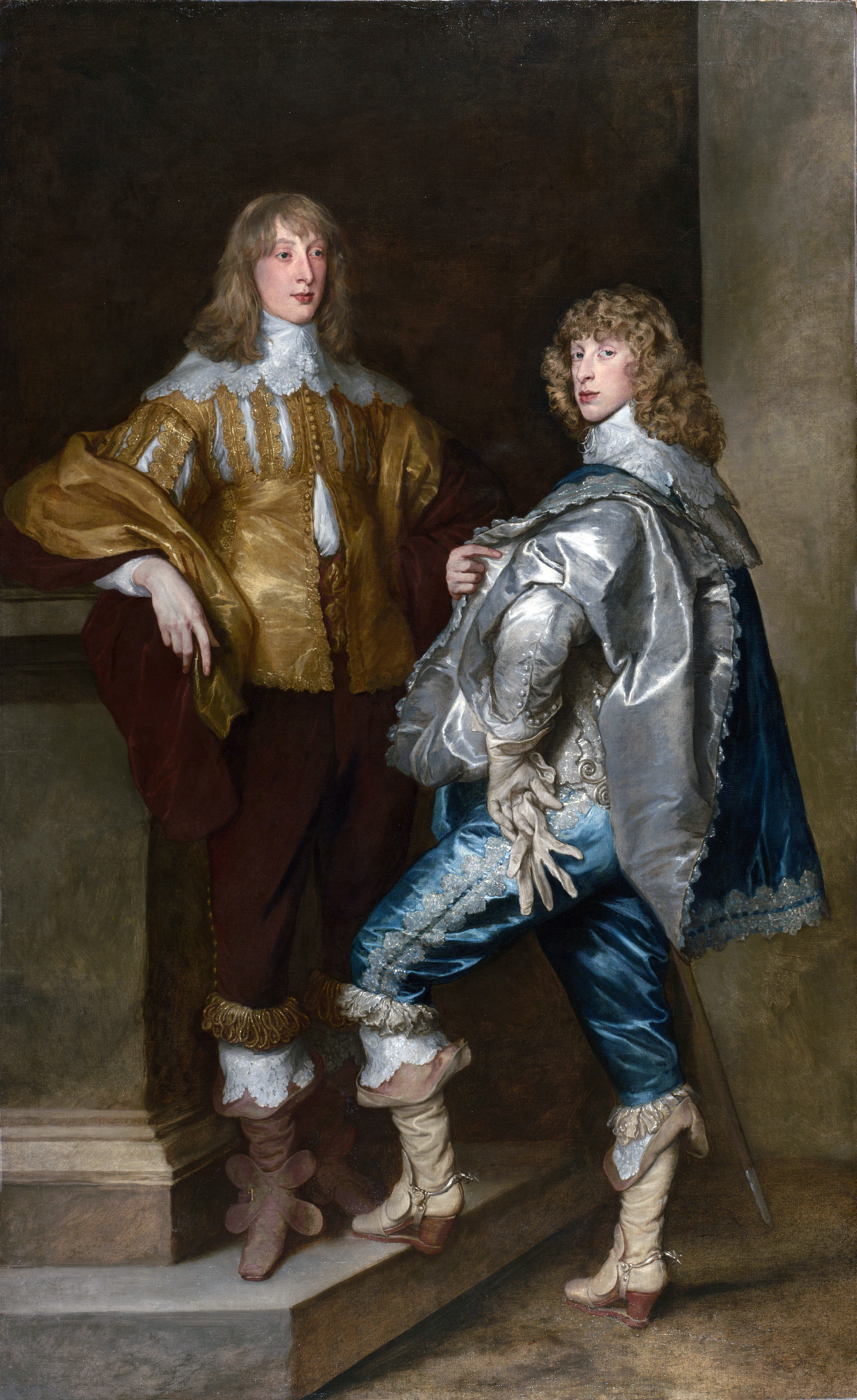
- Artist: Anthony van Dyck
- Year: c. 1638
- Medium: Oil on canvas
- Dimensions: 237.5 cm × 146.1 cm (93.5 in × 57.5 in)
- Location: National Gallery, London

Lord John Stuart and His Brother, Lord Bernard Stuart is a large oil painting by Anthony van Dyck, executed c. 1638. The life-size double portrait depicts the two youngest sons of Esmé Stewart, 3rd Duke of Lennox: Lord John Stewart (1621–1644) and Lord Bernard Stuart (1622–1645), aged about 17 and 16 respectively. The painting measures 237.5 cm × 146.1 cm (93.5 in × 57.5 in), and has been in the collection of the National Gallery, London, since 1988.

The painting depicts two young men. On the left is the sixth son of the 3rd Duke of Lennox, Lord John Stewart, and on the right is his seventh son, Lord Bernard Stewart (as is common in modern times, the National Gallery uses the French-influenced spelling "Stuart" for their family's name). Van Dyck also painted a portrait of their older brother, James, later 4th Duke of Lennox and 1st Duke of Richmond, which is now in the Metropolitan Museum of Art.

The two brothers are fashionably dressed in rich silk and satin clothing, with lace collars. John is wearing warm shades of gold and brown; Bernard is dressed contrastingly in cooler silver and blue. The drape and hue of the luxurious fabrics are accentuated by the muted brown background. They are both dressed for a journey: the painting was commissioned shortly before they departed in 1639 for a three-year Grand Tour of Europe.

John is standing on a step, leaning on a stone plinth, looking into the distance past the viewer. Bernard has stepped up onto the step with his left leg, with his left hand resting on his hip so that his left elbow juts out at an unnaturally awkward angle; he is gazing directly at the viewer, and lifting the edge of his cape with his right hand to reveal its silk lining, and his embroidered jacket and breeches; he also has leather boots with spurs, and a sword. They are standing close together, alluding to their close relationship, but their opposed postures and divergent eyelines suggest some unresolved tension between them.

Both brothers were killed while fighting for Charles I in the English Civil War: John at the Battle of Cheriton in 1644, and Bernard the following year commanding the Life Guards at the Battle of Rowton Heath.

The painting was kept by the Stewart family until 1672, when Charles Stewart, 3rd Duke of Richmond, 6th Duke of Lennox, died without issue. Most of his property and the Barony of Clifton were inherited by his sister Katherine O'Brien, 7th Baroness Clifton, and the painting was later in the collection of her granddaughter Theodosia Hyde, 10th Baroness Clifton. It remained in the family until it was sold around 1904 to the art dealer Sir George Donaldson. It was acquired by the banker Sir Ernest Cassel and passed down to his great-granddaughters Patricia Knatchbull, 2nd Countess Mountbatten of Burma, and Lady Pamela Hicks. It was bought by the National Gallery in London in 1988.

A copy of the painting was made by Thomas Gainsborough for John Bligh, 3rd Earl of Darnley which is now in the Saint Louis Art Museum.

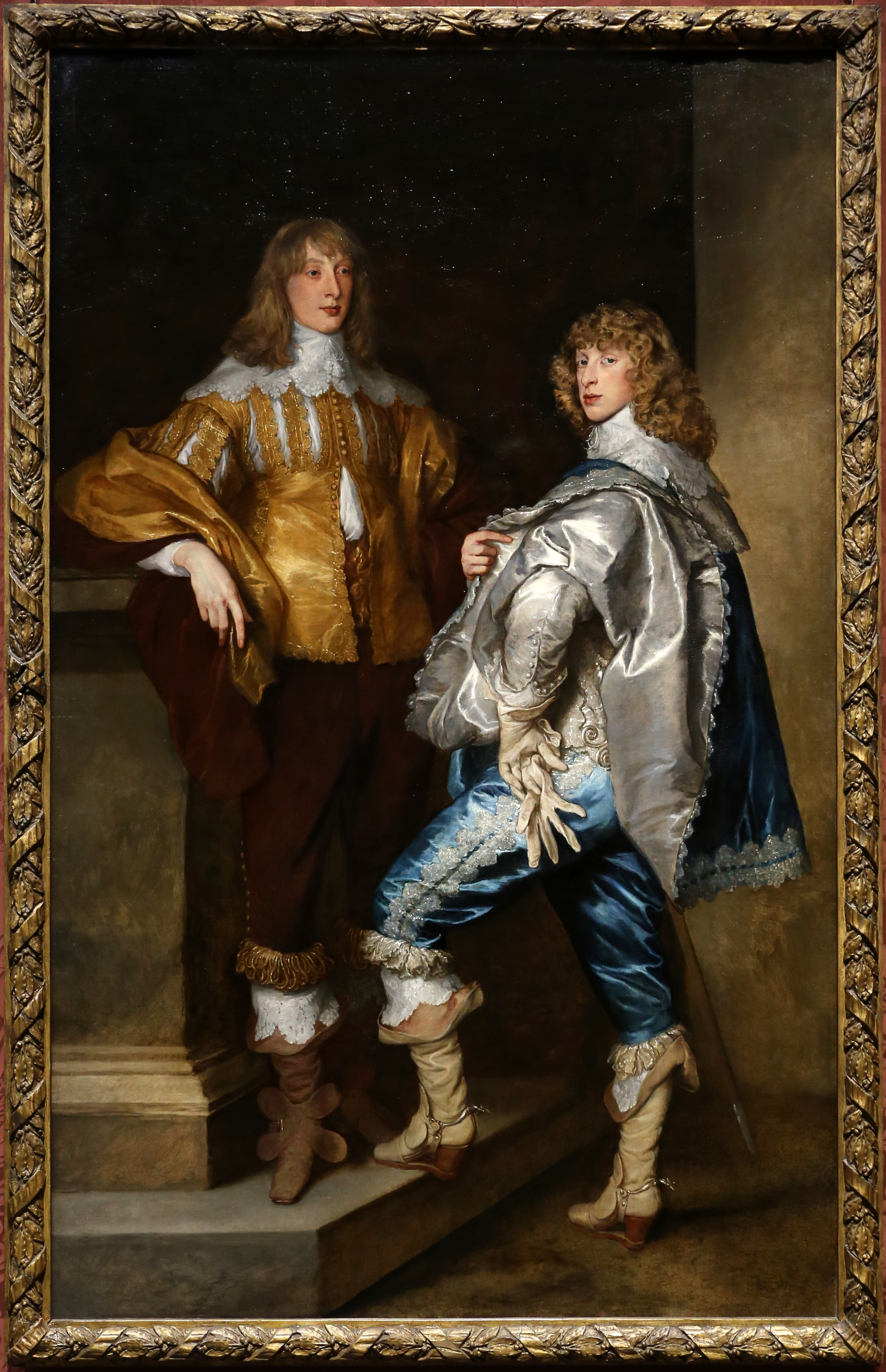
Lord John Stuart and His Brother, Lord Bernard Stuart, with frame

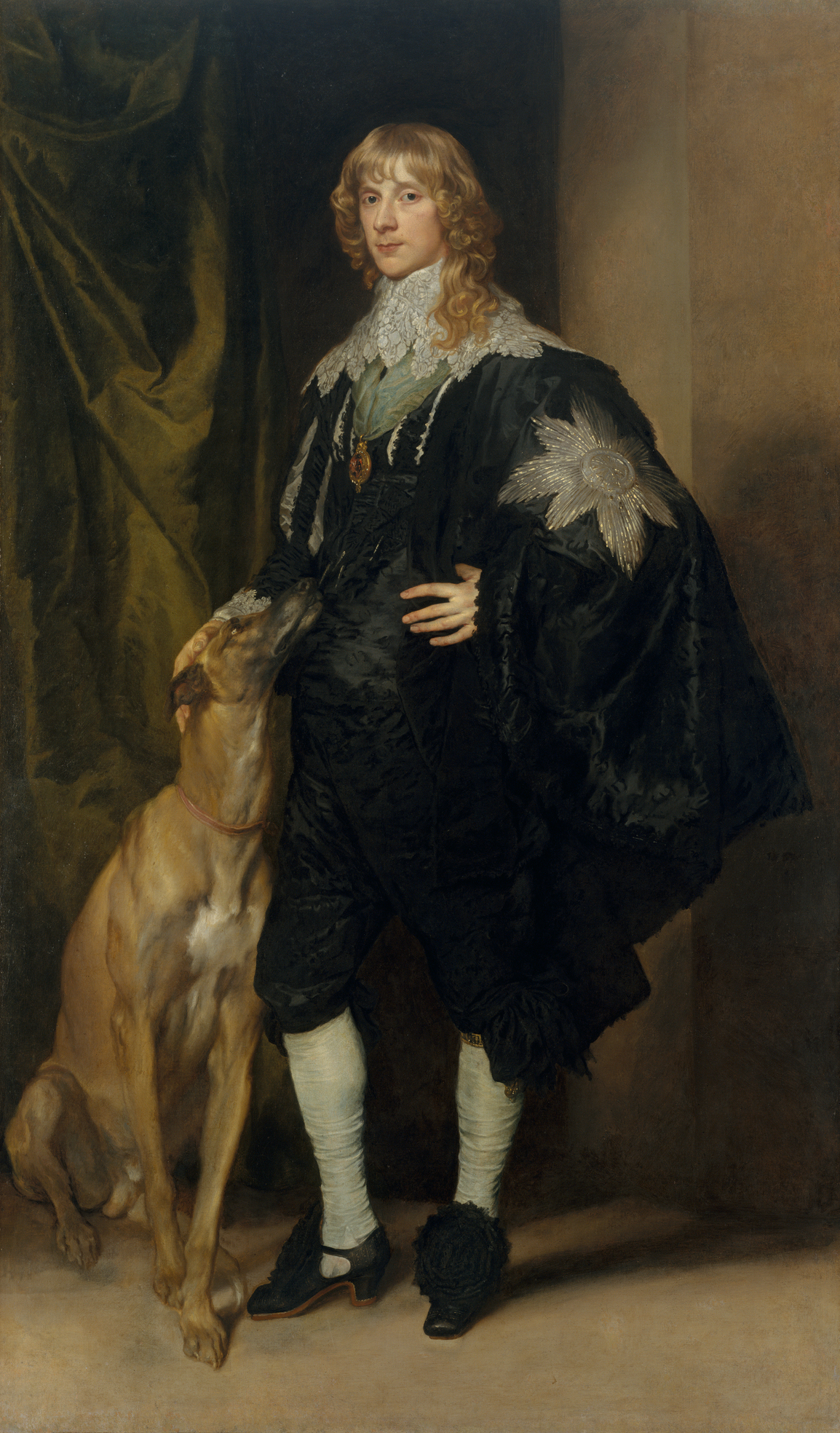
Anthony van Dyck, Portrait of James Stewart, c. 1633–1635, Metropolitan Museum of Art

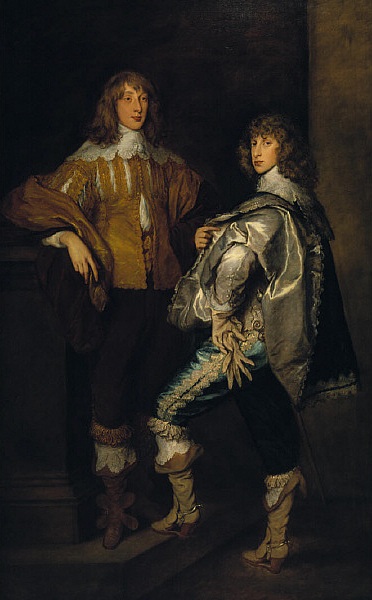
Lords John and Bernard Stuart by Thomas Gainsborough c.1760-1770, Saint Louis Art Museum

== See also ==
- List of paintings by Anthony van Dyck
