= Elizabeth Delaval =

English writer

Lady Elizabeth Delaval
- Born: Elizabeth Livingston c. 1648
- Died: 1717; Rouen, France
- Occupations: Memoirist, Jacobite agent
- Notable work: The meditations of Lady Elizabeth Delaval written between 1662 and 1671
- Spouse(s): Robert Delaval (1670–1682); Henry Hatcher (1686–1713)

Lady Elizabeth Delaval (c. 1648 – 1717) was a memoirist and Jacobite agent, whose self-reflective writings 'shed light on the upbringing and marriage arrangements of a girl belonging to a prominent royalist family.'

== Life ==
Elizabeth Delaval was the only daughter of James Livingston, 1st Earl of Newburgh, a Scottish peer and member of the House of Commons, and his first wife, Katherine Stuart. In 1649, during the English Civil War the family left Bagshot, Surrey for The Hague. The following year, on the death of her mother, Elizabeth was taken into the care of her father's sister and raised by her in Nocton, Lincolnshire. In 1662, aged 14, Elizabeth was made a maid of the privy chamber to Catherine of Braganza. On 10 July 1670, she married Robert Delaval, the son of Sir Ralph Delaval, 1st Baronet. Affected by her precarious position as a woman, whose fate was largely in the hands of her father and aunt, and by religious troubles, Deleval's Meditations reflect:

a worldly crisis that is interwoven with her attempts to achieve an improved spiritual state using prayer and meditation.

Delaval's memoirs cover the years 1663 and 1672, from her teenage years to her early twenties. They alternate between the religiously focused (including meditations and prayers), and the personal (including commentary on her family relationships and romantic courtships). Providing insights into both her daily life, and the politics of her time, Delaval's writings have been studied by scholars in the fields of social history, Jacobite history, and literary studies.

Delaval's writings stopped shortly after her marriage, but demonstrate her unhappiness within it. She describes how 'miserably' she has 'failed in the performance of this last new duty’ as a wife. Nevertheless, the marriage lasted until Robert Delaval's death in 1682.

Elizabeth Delaval remarried in 1686. Her second husband was Henry Hatcher, with whom, in 1688, she was involved 'in a plot to hide documents to be sent to James II in a ‘pewter pot’ with a false bottom', known as the pewter pot conspiracy. Elizabeth was sought as a conspirator, and fled to France. She and Henry were employed by the court at St Germain-en-Laye, and - a Jacobite agent - she appears to have travelled between Paris and London during the 1690s. In the years following the death of James II, she petitioned a number of times to return to England, but was denied. Even when she asked to return to England as a widow in 1713, she appears to have been refused.

She died in France, still in exile, in 1717.
