= Lord Bernard Stewart =

Franco-Scottish nobleman (1623–1645)

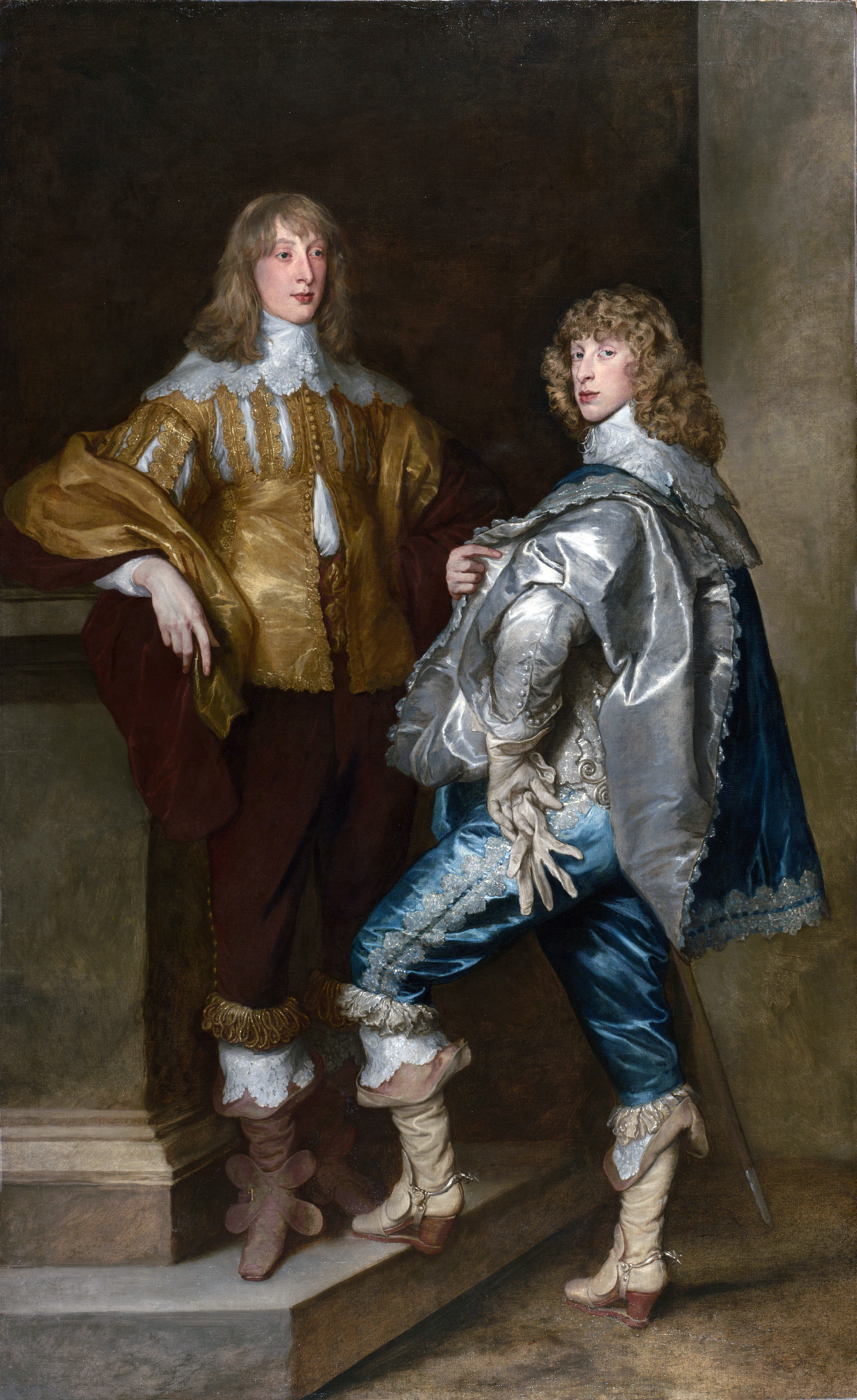
- Lord Bernard Stewart (right), pictured with his elder brother Lord John Stewart (1621–1644). Lord John Stuart and his Brother, Lord Bernard Stuart, c. 1638, by Sir Anthony van Dyck. Both were killed during the Civil War, John in 1644 aged 23 and Bernard in 1645 aged 22
- Born: 1623
- Died: 26 September 1645 (aged 22); Rowton, Cheshire
- Parents: Esmé Stewart (father); Katherine Clifton (mother)
- Relatives: James Stewart (brother); George Stewart (brother); John Stewart (brother); Charles Stewart (nephew); Esmé Stewart (grandfather)

Lord Bernard Stewart (1623 – 26 September 1645) was a Franco-Scottish nobleman and a third cousin of King Charles I of England, both being descended in the male line from John Stewart, 3rd Earl of Lennox. He served as a Royalist commander in the English Civil War, during which he was killed aged 22 and unmarried.

== Origins ==
He was the youngest of the six sons of Esmé Stewart, 3rd Duke of Lennox (1579–1624) by his wife Katherine Clifton, 2nd Baroness Clifton. His eldest brother was James Stewart, 1st Duke of Richmond, 4th Duke of Lennox.

== Career ==
Lord Bernard was to be created Earl of Lichfield by King Charles I for his actions at the first and second Battles of Newbury and at the Battle of Naseby but he died of injuries received leading a sortie against besieging Parliamentary forces in the Battle of Rowton Heath in September 1645, before the requisite letters patent were drawn up. The titles of Baron Newbury and Earl of Lichfield were instead created in December 1645 for his six-year-old nephew, Charles Stewart, 3rd Duke of Richmond, 6th Duke of Lennox (1639–1672), the son of Bernard's elder brother George Stewart, 9th Seigneur d'Aubigny, killed at the Battle of Edgehill in 1642. His elder brother, Lord John Stewart (1621–1644), was killed at the Battle of Cheriton in 1644.
