= Katherine Stuart =

English noblewoman and Royalist supporter

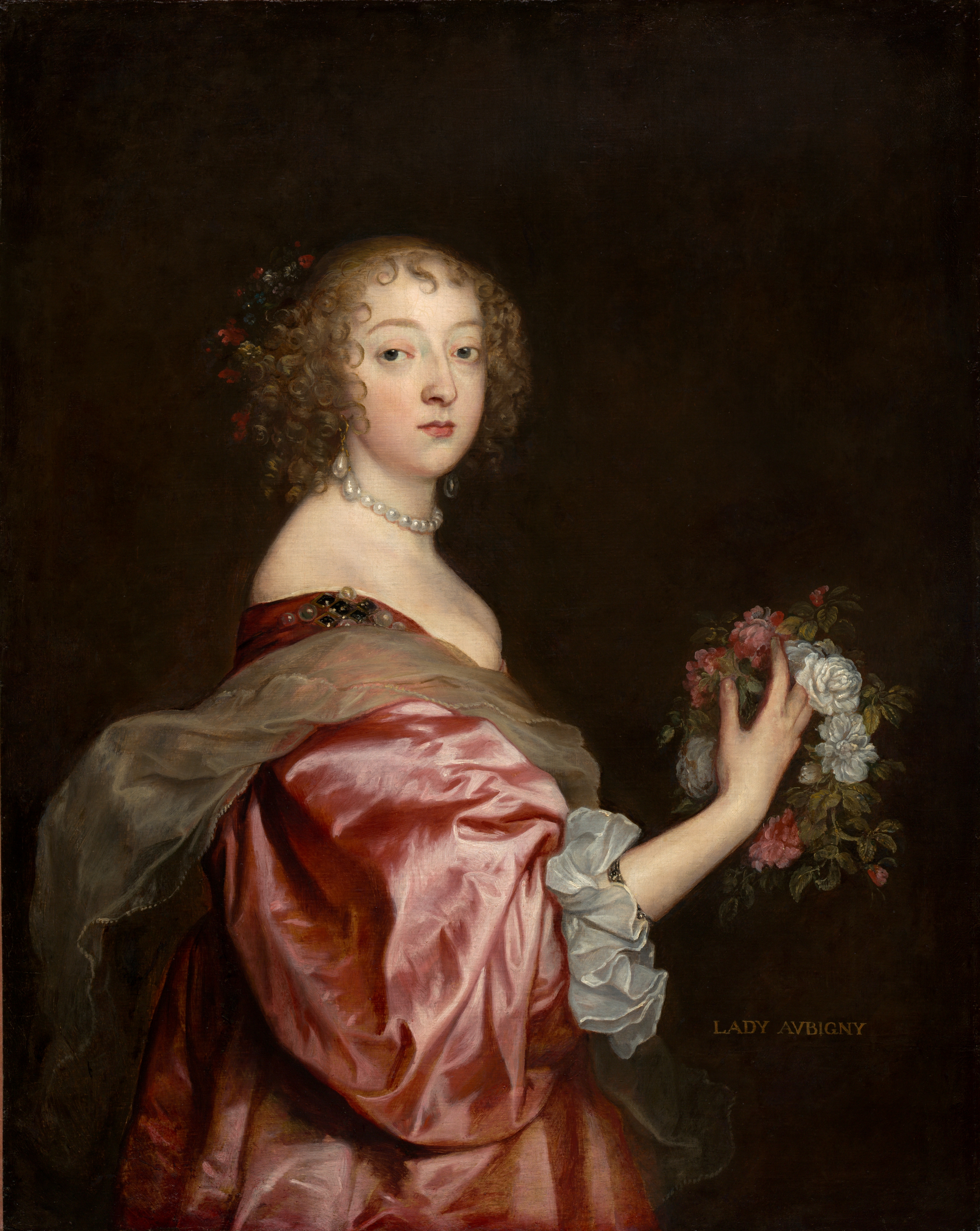
- Portrait by Van Dyck, circa 1638. National Gallery of Art, Washington DC
- Died: 1650; The Hague, United Provinces of the Netherlands
- Other names: Katherine Howard; Katherine, Lady Aubigny; Katherine Livingston, Viscountess Newburgh
- Occupations: English noblewoman and Royalist supporter
- Spouse(s): George Stewart, 9th Seigneur d'Aubigny (1638–1642); James Livingston, Viscount Newburgh (1648–1650)
- Children: 1) Charles Stewart, 3rd Duke of Richmond; 2) Katherine Stewart, Baroness Clifton; 3) 18 Aug 1642 a baptism for Maria daughter of George Lord Stewart and Lady Katherine his wife was registered at St Martin's in the Field; 4) Elizabeth Livingstone
- Parent(s): Theophilus Howard, 2nd Earl of Suffolk; Lady Elizabeth Home

Katherine Stuart (after 1612 – 1650) was an English noblewoman and Royalist supporter during the English Civil War. She had married, in secret, her first husband, George Stewart, 9th Seigneur d'Aubigny, against the wishes of both King Charles I and her parents. George commanded a regiment for the king in the opening stages of the war and was killed at the Battle of Edgehill on 23 October 1642.

Katherine used a visit to London, ostensibly to deal with her husband's estate, to clandestinely pass messages to Royalists in the city. After her discovery she was imprisoned in the Tower of London before being released by the intervention of the French ambassador.

Widowed since 1642, Katherine married James Livingston in 1648. The pair unsuccessfully attempted to release the king from parliament's captivity during his journey to trial. After the king's execution, the couple fled to the Netherlands where Katherine died in 1650.

== Early life and secret marriage ==
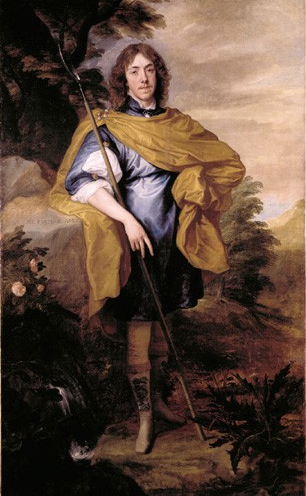
Van Dyck's portrait of George

Stuart was born Katherine Howard to Theophilus Howard, 2nd Earl of Suffolk, and his Scottish wife, Lady Elizabeth Home, daughter of the Earl of Dunbar. Lady Katherine defied her parents and secretly married George Stewart, 9th Seigneur d'Aubigny, in May 1638. By doing so she also went against the plans of King Charles I who was guardian to George and his brother James Stewart, 1st Duke of Richmond. The marriage was immortalised in a Van Dyck portrait of George which had the motto "love is stronger than I am". The couple had a son, Charles Stewart, 3rd Duke of Richmond (born 1639), and a daughter, Katherine Stewart, Baroness Clifton (born before 1642).

== First English Civil War ==
At the outbreak of the First English Civil War in August 1642 George sided with the king and was killed whilst commanding a cavalry regiment at the Battle of Edgehill on 23 October 1642. After her husband's death Katherine joined Charles' court at Oxford. She was granted permission by the parliamentary forces to enter London in May 1643 to put her husband's affairs in order and used this trip to convey messages from the king to Royalist sympathisers in the city (part of the Waller plot). King Charles once received so many letters in code from Katherine on the subject of his Scottish supporters that he put them aside, writing it would cost a whole day to decipher them.

The Waller Plot failed and Katherine was arrested and imprisoned in the Tower of London. Several of the conspirators were hanged but Katherine managed to arrange her release through the French ambassador by virtue of her husband's French titles. By May 1645 Katherine was in Bristol where, as the First Civil War neared its end, she sought to return to the king's favour through George Digby, 2nd Earl of Bristol.

== Second English Civil War ==
In Summer 1647 Katherine was granted extensive rights and claims over her husband's estate by the House of Lords, perhaps due to the influence of her brother James Howard, 3rd Earl of Suffolk. The Second English Civil War began in February 1648 and later that year Katherine married James Livingston, Viscount Newburgh. The king was by then in custody of the parliamentarians and stayed with the Newburghs at their house in Bagshot, Surrey in December 1648 whilst being taken from the Isle of Wight to Windsor in preparation for his trial. Katherine and her husband attempted to free the king but were foiled by Major General Thomas Harrison; though they were able to pass messages from Charles to his wife Henrietta Maria of France.

== Later life ==
Following the king's execution Katherine and her husband fled with other royalists to The Hague in the Netherlands. The couple had a daughter, Elizabeth, before Katherine died in 1650. James was made Earl of Newburgh following the Restoration of 1660. Katherine's death was a blow to the Royalists and she was described by Edward Hyde, 1st Earl of Clarendon, in his History of the Rebellion as "a woman of a very great wit, and most trusted and conversant in those intrigues which at that time could be best managed and carried on by ladies".
