= Mary Villiers, Lady Herbert of Shurland =

Painting by Anthony van Dyck

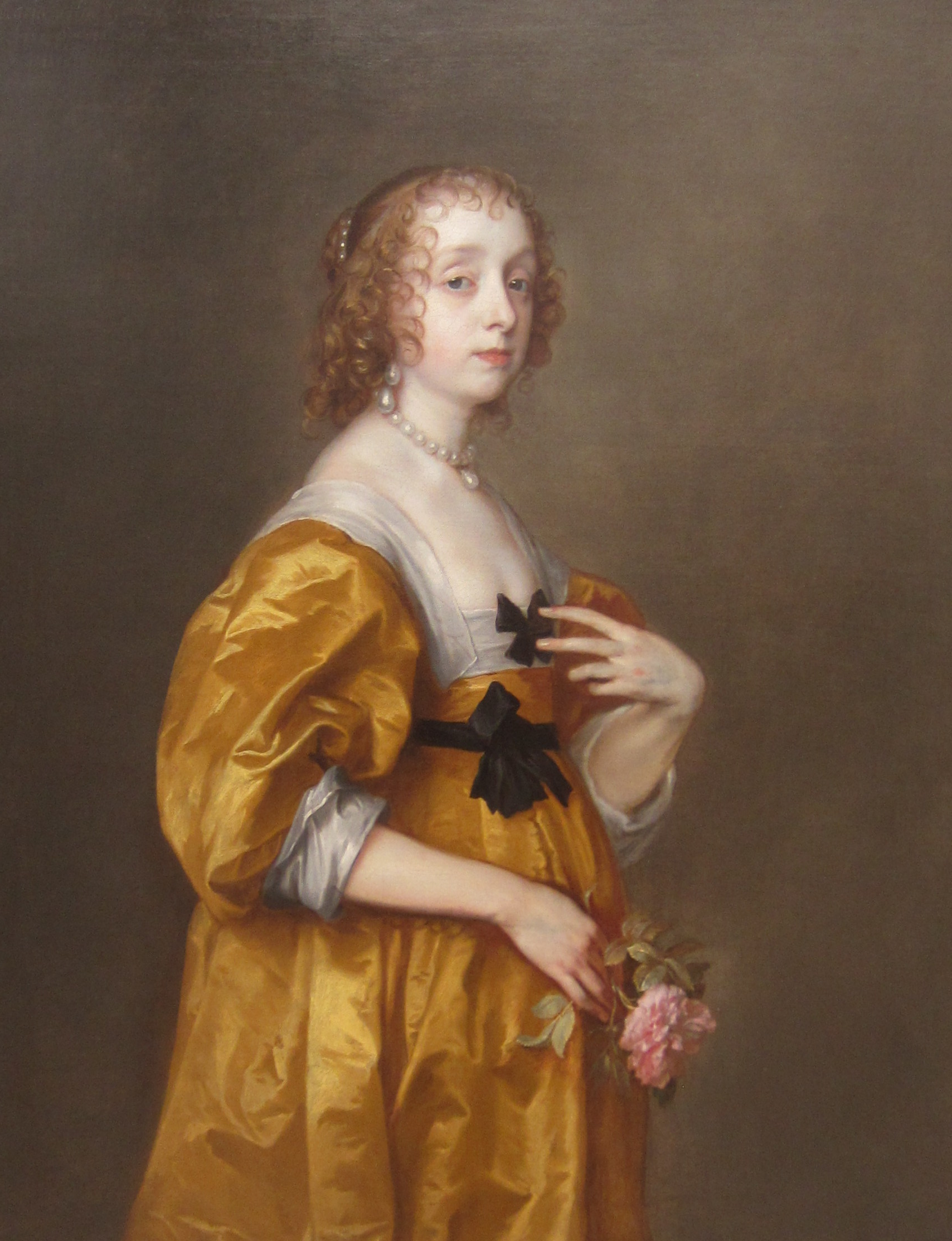
- Artist: Anthony van Dyck
- Year: 1636
- Subject: Mary Stewart, Duchess of Richmond
- Dimensions: 101 cm × 83.8 cm (40 in × 33.0 in)
- Location: Timken Museum of Art, San Diego, California

Mary Villiers, Lady Herbert of Shurland is a c. 1636 oil painting on canvas by Anthony van Dyck. It is a portrait of Mary Stewart, Duchess of Richmond as a young widow (pointing to her mourning brooch), before she married for the second time to the Duke of Richmond.

== See also ==
- List of paintings by Anthony van Dyck
