= Mary Stewart, Duchess of Richmond =

English duchess

Her Grace The Duchess of Richmond and Lennox
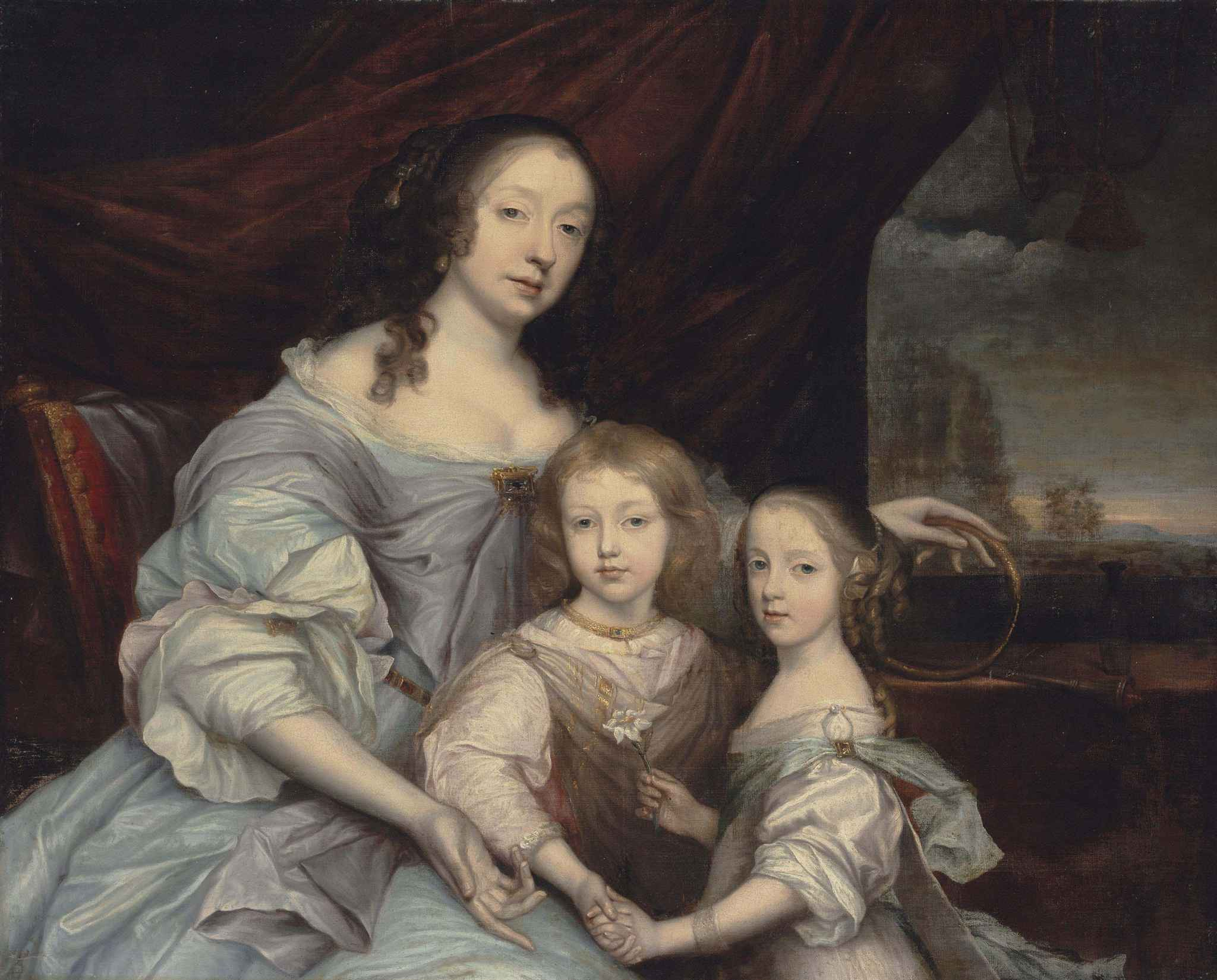
- Mary, Duchess of Richmond, with her children, Esmé and Mary, by John Michael Wright.

Personal details
- Born: 1622
- Died: 1685 (aged 62–63)
- Spouse(s): Charles Herbert, Lord Herbert; James Stewart, 1st Duke of Richmond; Colonel Thomas Howard
- Children: Esmé Stewart, 2nd Duke of Richmond; Mary Butler, Countess of Arran
- Parent(s): George Villiers, 1st Duke of Buckingham; Katherine Manners, 19th Baroness de Ros

Mary Stewart, Duchess of Richmond and Duchess of Lennox (née Villiers; 1622–1685) was the daughter of George Villiers, 1st Duke of Buckingham and Katherine Manners, Baroness de Ros.

On 8 January 1634, at the age of 12, she married the 15-year-old Charles, Lord Herbert, eldest son of the 4th Earl of Pembroke and 1st Earl of Montgomery, but was widowed in 1635 when her young husband died of smallpox or perhaps petechiae. On 3 August 1637, she married the 4th Duke of Lennox, who was created Duke of Richmond in 1641. They had two children:

- Esmé Stewart, 2nd Duke of Richmond and 5th Duke of Lennox (2 November 1649 – 10 August 1660), died of smallpox.
- Lady Mary Stewart (10 July 1651 – 4 July 1668), Baroness Clifton in 1660; married Richard Butler, 1st Earl of Arran. No issue.

Sometime before 1664, Mary married Colonel Thomas Howard (d. 1678); he was a younger brother of Charles Howard, 1st Earl of Carlisle, and is chiefly remembered for his duel in 1662 with Henry Jermyn, 1st Baron Dover.

Maureen E. Mulvihill has built a case for Mary Villiers as the author of the poems published under the pseudonym Ephelia, including Female Poems...by Ephelia (1679).

In October 1670 the duchess, with the queen, and her friend the Duchess of Buckingham decided to go to a fair near Audley End disguised as country women for a "merry frolic", dressed in red petticoats and waistcoats. The costumes were outlandish rather than convincing, and they began to draw a crowd, when they tried to buy stockings and gloves their speech was also conspicuous. A member of the crowd recognised the duchess from a dinner she had attended. The party returned followed by as many people at the fair as had horses.

== Depiction in art ==
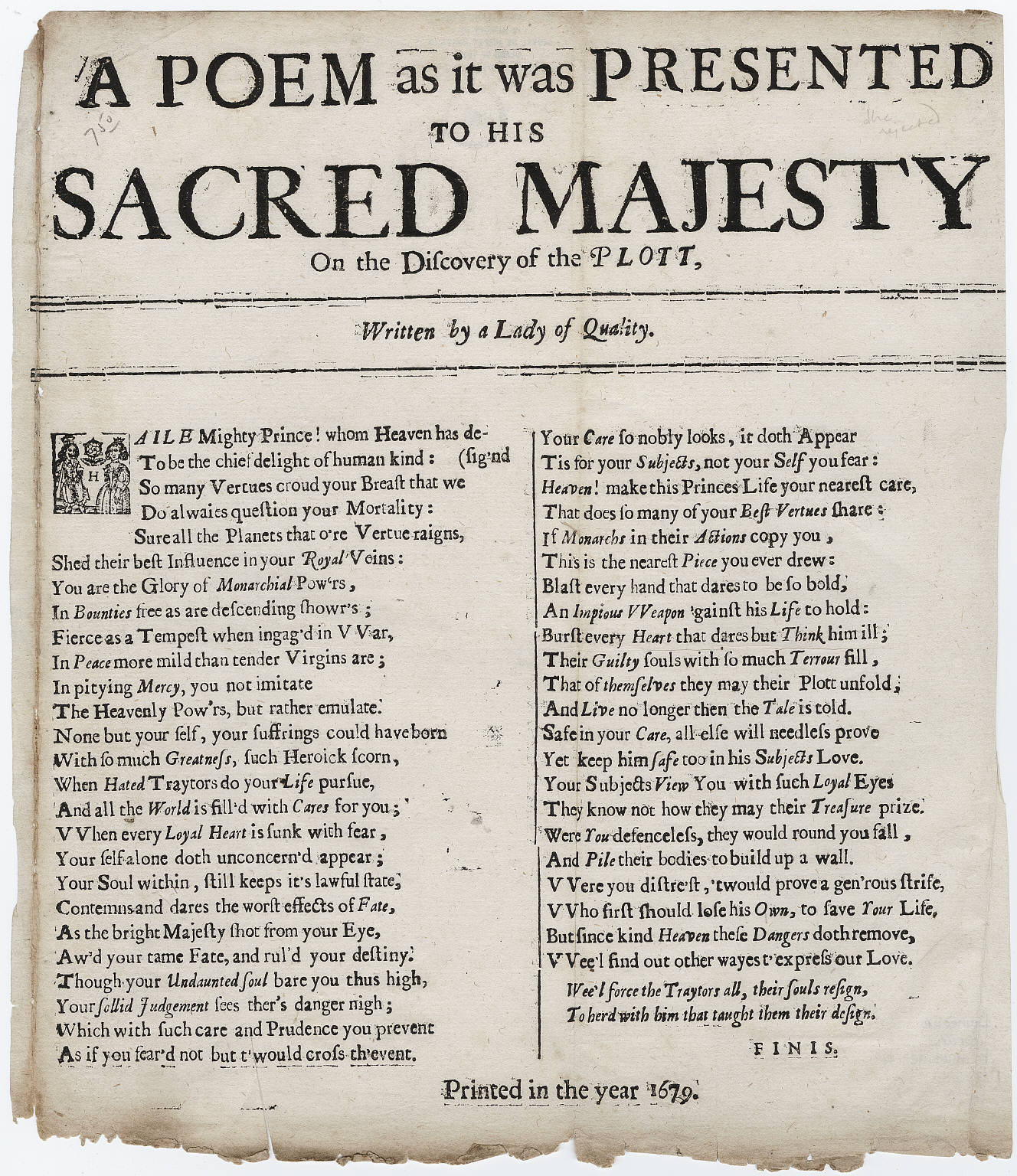
A Poem as it was presented to His Sacred Majesty, on the discovery of the plott. Written by a lady of quality, by Ephelia, 1679

Mary is the subject of several paintings by Anthony van Dyck as well as a portrait with her children by John Michael Wright.

Mary Stewart, Duchess of Richmond depiction in art

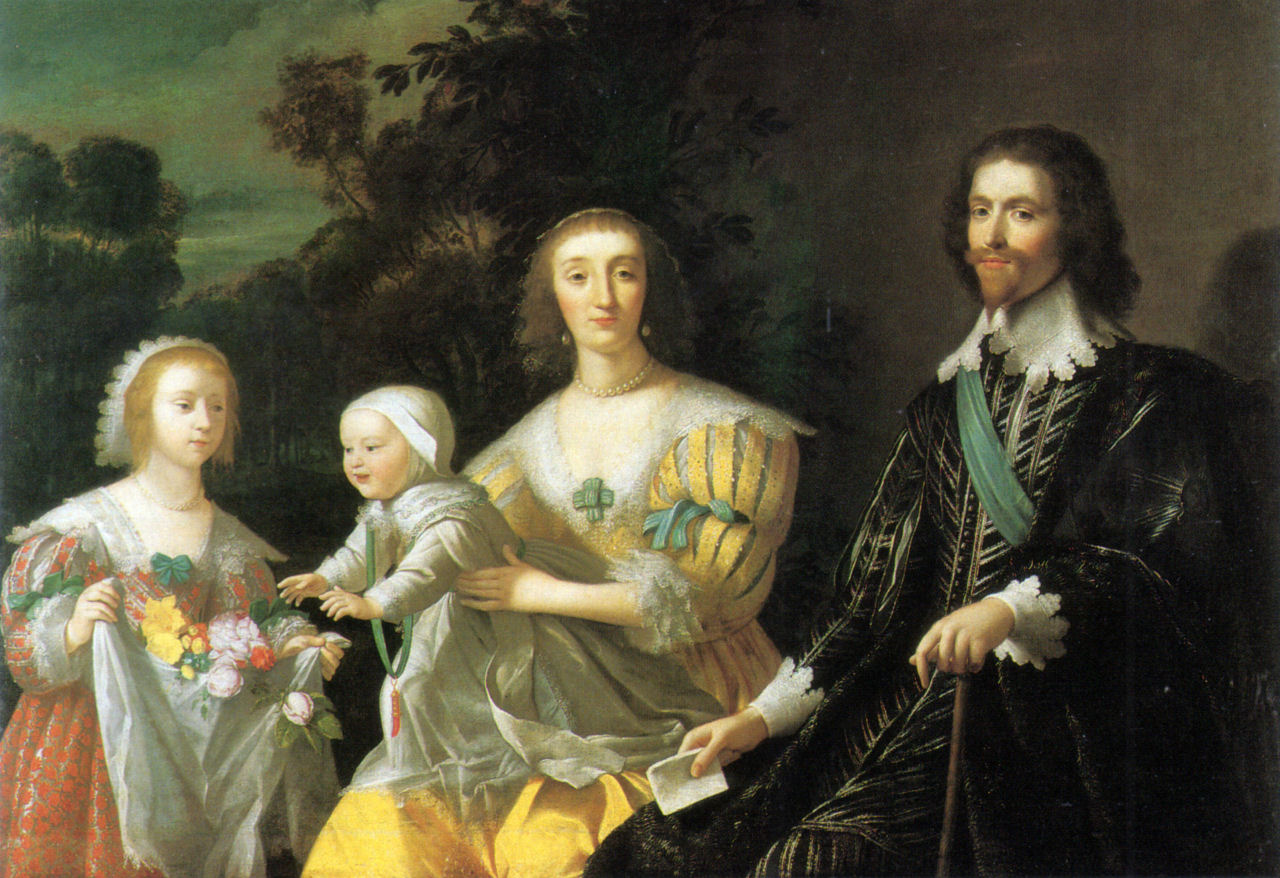
Her parents, George Villiers Duke of Buckingham and Family 1628 by Gerard van Honthorst

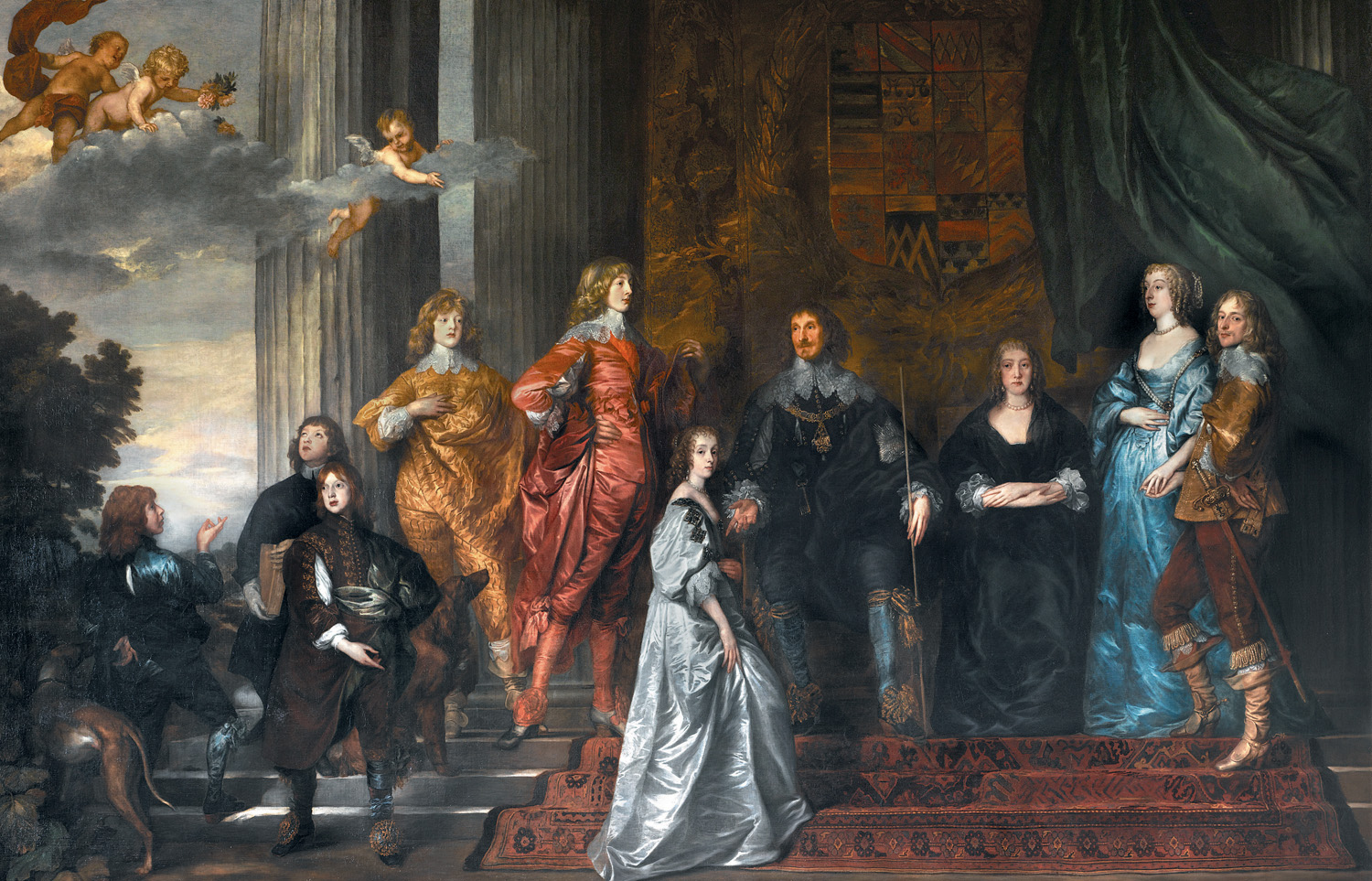
Lady Mary (in white) with her first husband's family and father in law 4th Earl of Pembroke. Circa 1635

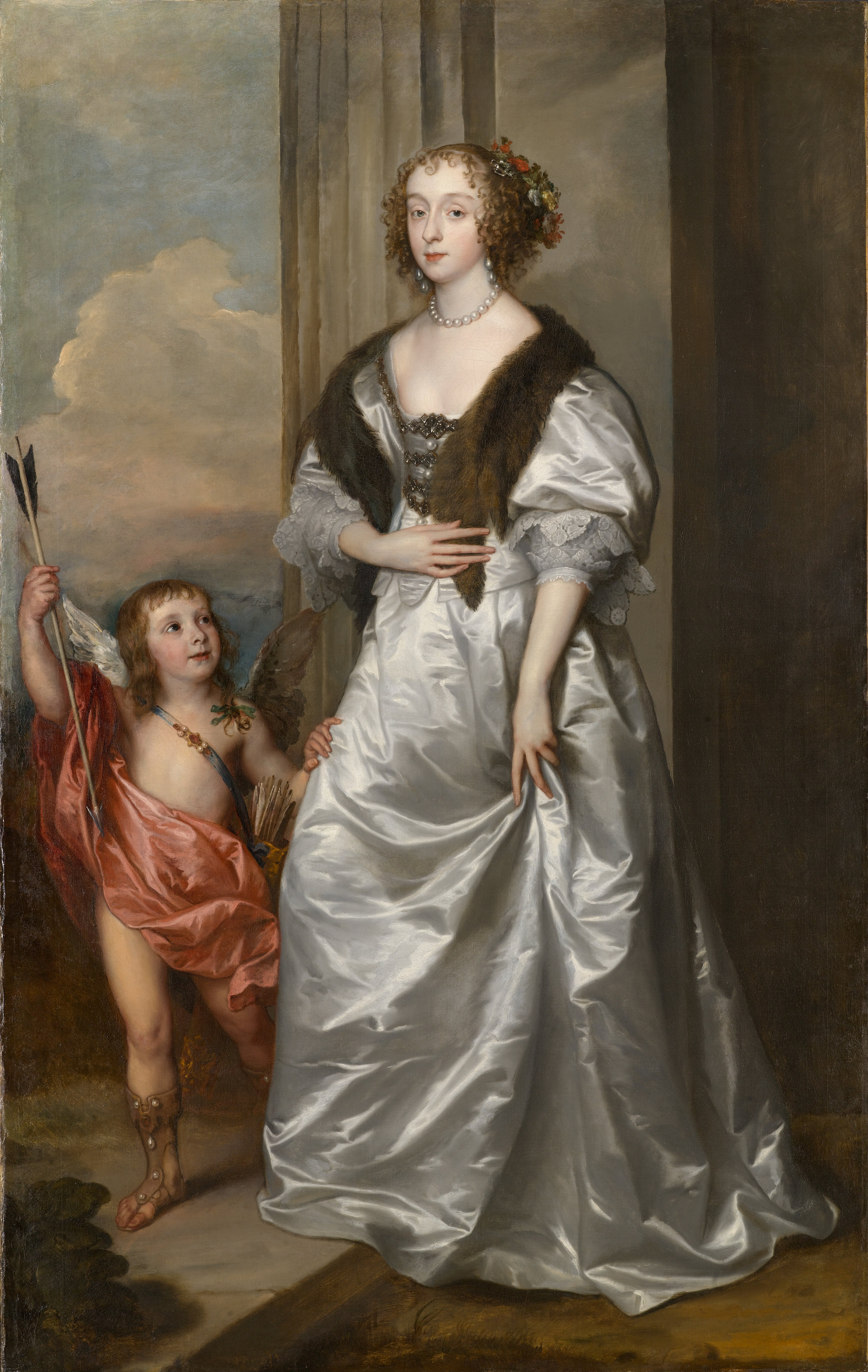
Mary Villiers, later Duchess of Richmond and Lennox, with her cousin Charles Hamilton, Lord Arran, as Cupid, circa 1636, by Anthony van Dyck.

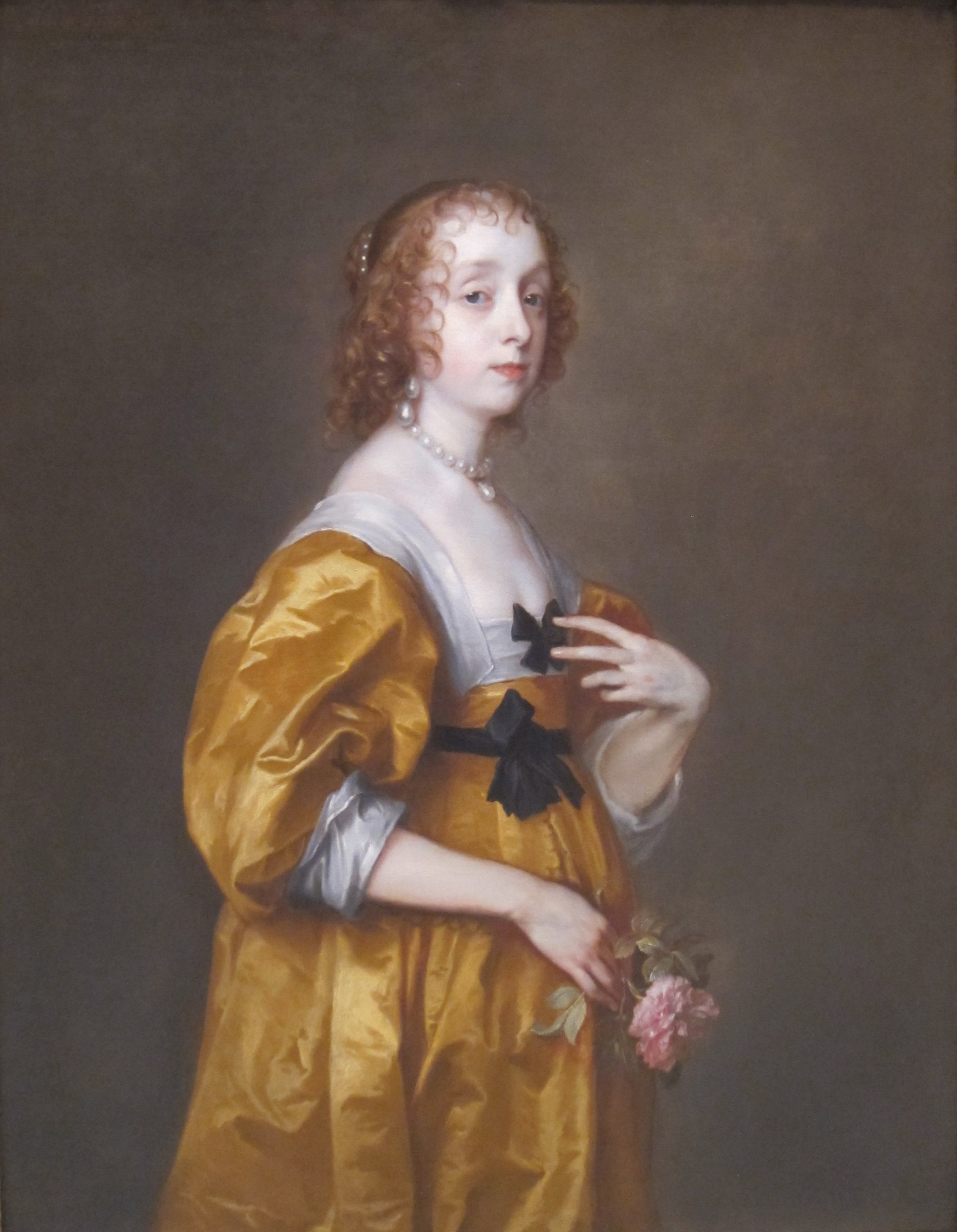
Mary Villiers, Lady Herbert of Shurland, circa 1636, by Anthony van Dyck.

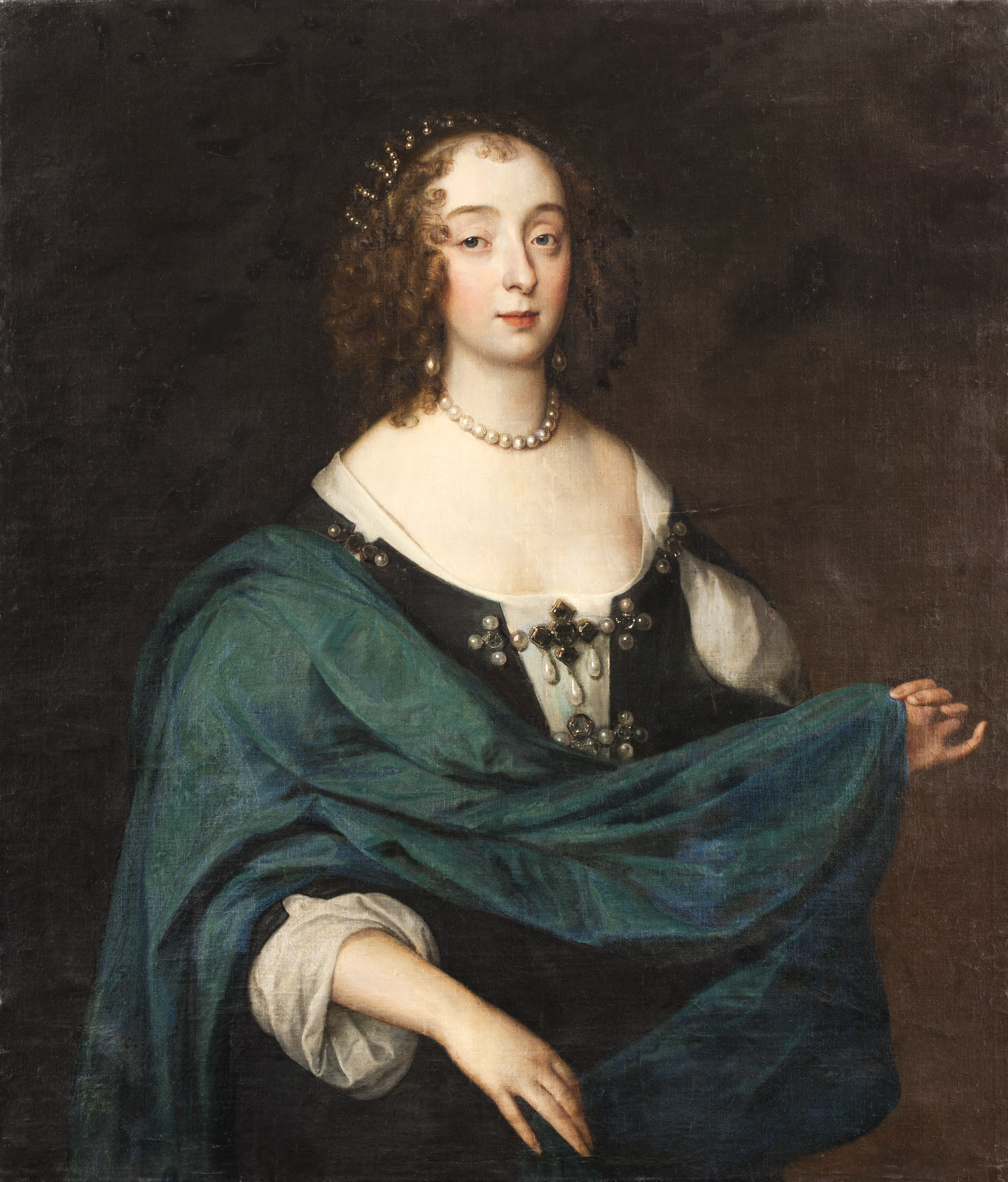
Mary Villiers, Duchess of Richmond and Lennox about 1640, Skokloster Castle

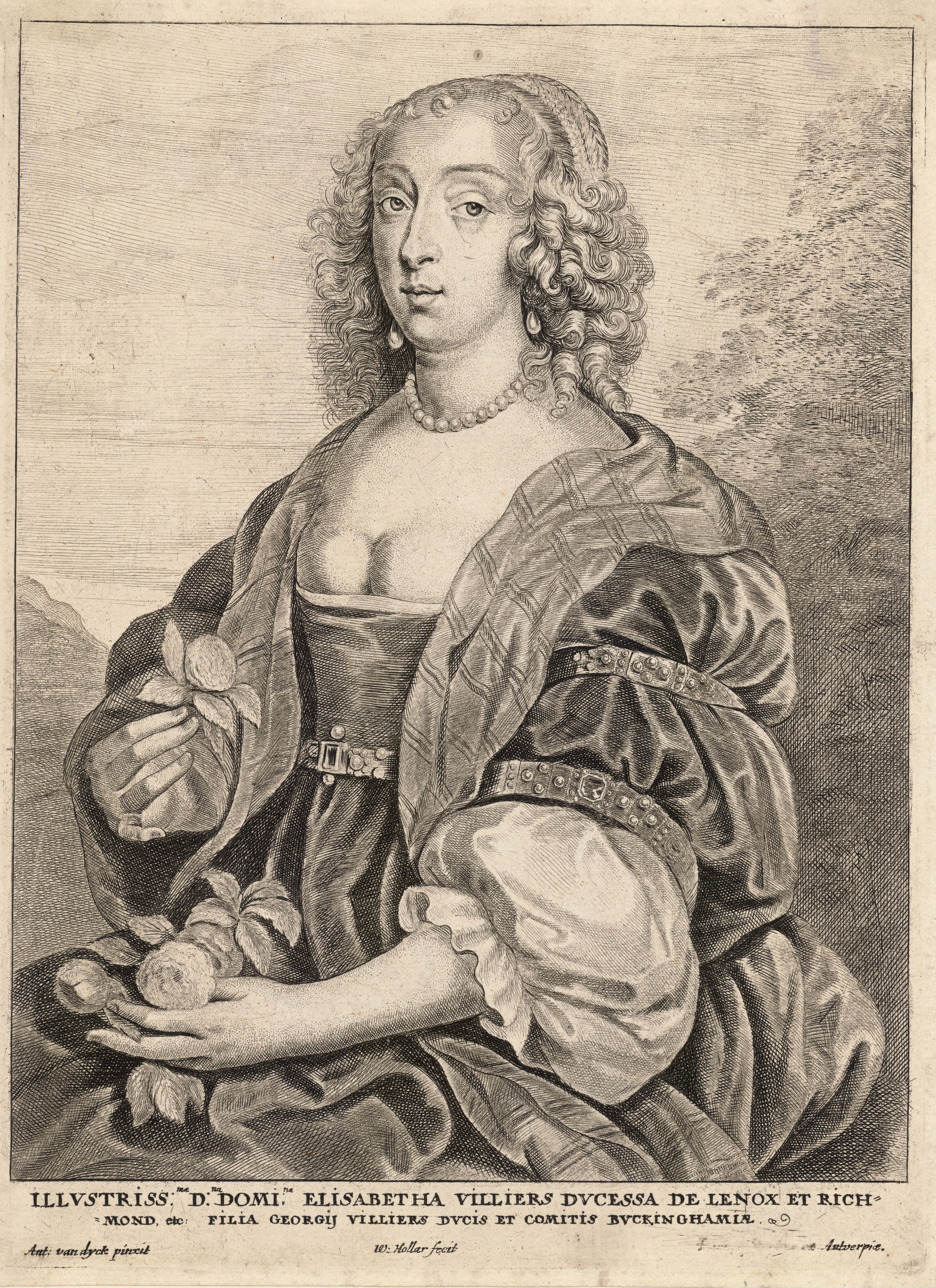
Duchess of Lennox, after van Dyck, by Wenceslaus Hollar

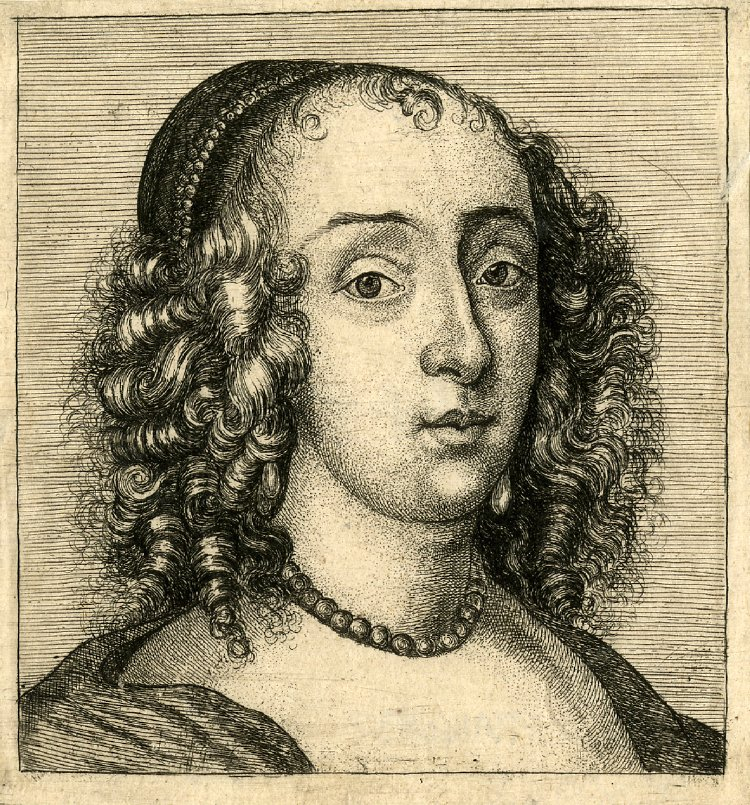
Mary, Duchess of Lennox and Richmond, by Richard Gaywood
