= Cavalier =

Royalist supporter in the English Civil War

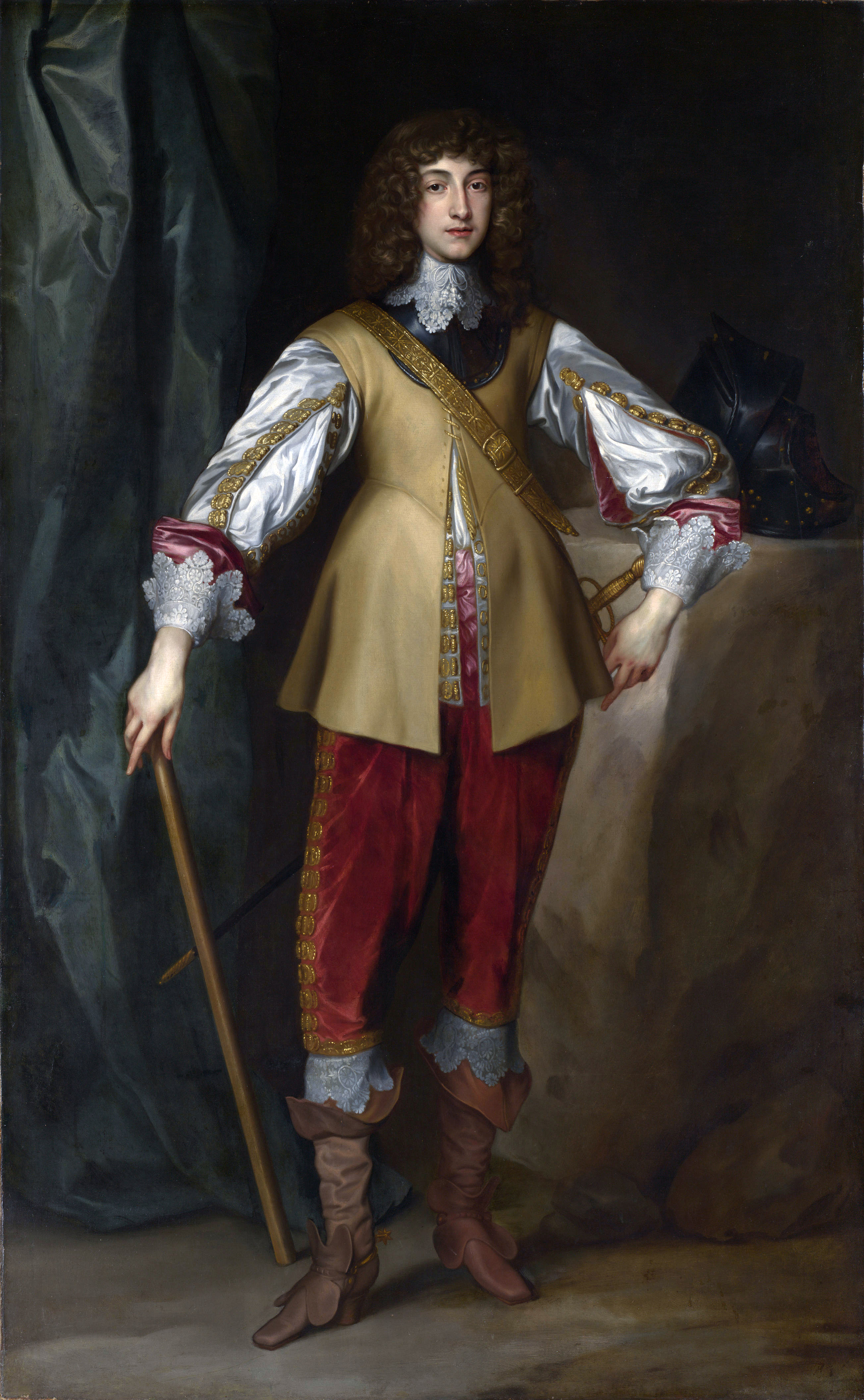
Prince Rupert of the Rhine, often considered to be an archetypal Cavalier

The term Cavalier (/ˌkævəˈlɪər/) was first used to describe cavalrymen, and later by Roundheads as a term of abuse for the wealthier royalist supporters of Charles I of England and his son Charles II during the English Civil War, the Interregnum, and the Restoration (1642 – c. 1679). It was later adopted by the Royalists themselves. Although it referred originally to political and social attitudes and behaviour, of which clothing was a very small part, it has subsequently become strongly identified with the fashionable clothing of the court at the time. Prince Rupert, commander of much of Charles I's cavalry, is often considered to be an archetypal Cavalier.

== Etymology ==
Cavalier derives from the same Latin root as the Italian word cavaliere, the French word chevalier, and the Spanish word caballero, the Vulgar Latin word caballarius, meaning 'horseman'. Shakespeare used the word cavaleros to describe an overbearing swashbuckler or swaggering gallant in Henry IV, Part 2 (c. 1596–1599), in which Robert Shallow says, "I'll drink to Master Bardolph, and to all the cavaleros about London". Shallow returns in The Merry Wives of Windsor (c. 1597), where he is called "Cavaleiro Justice" (knightly judge) and "bully rook", a term meaning "blustering cheat".

=== English Civil War ===
Cavaliers
- King: Charles I of England
- Founded: 1642
- Dissolved: 1678
- Succeeded by: Tories
- Ideology: Monarchism; Factions: Absolute monarchism
- Religion: Protestantism (Anglicanism) (majority); Catholicism (minority)

"Cavalier" is chiefly associated with the Royalist supporters of King Charles I in his struggle with Parliament in the English Civil War. It first appears as a term of reproach and contempt, applied to Charles' followers in June 1642:

1642 (June 10) Propositions of Parlt. in Clarendon v. (1702) I. 504 Several sorts of malignant Men, who were about the King; some whereof, under the name of Cavaliers, without having respect to the Laws of the Land, or any fear either of God or Man, were ready to commit all manner of Outrage and Violence. 1642 Petition Lords & Com. 17 June in Rushw. Coll. III. (1721) I. 631 That your Majesty..would please to dismiss your extraordinary Guards, and the Cavaliers and others of that Quality, who seem to have little Interest or Affection to the publick Good, their Language and Behaviour speaking nothing but Division and War.

Charles, in the Answer to the Petition 13 June 1642, speaks of Cavaliers as a "word by what mistake soever it seemes much in disfavour". It was soon reappropriated as a title of honour by the king's party, who in return applied Roundhead to their opponents. At the Restoration, the court party preserved the name, which survived until the rise of the term Tory.

== Social perceptions ==
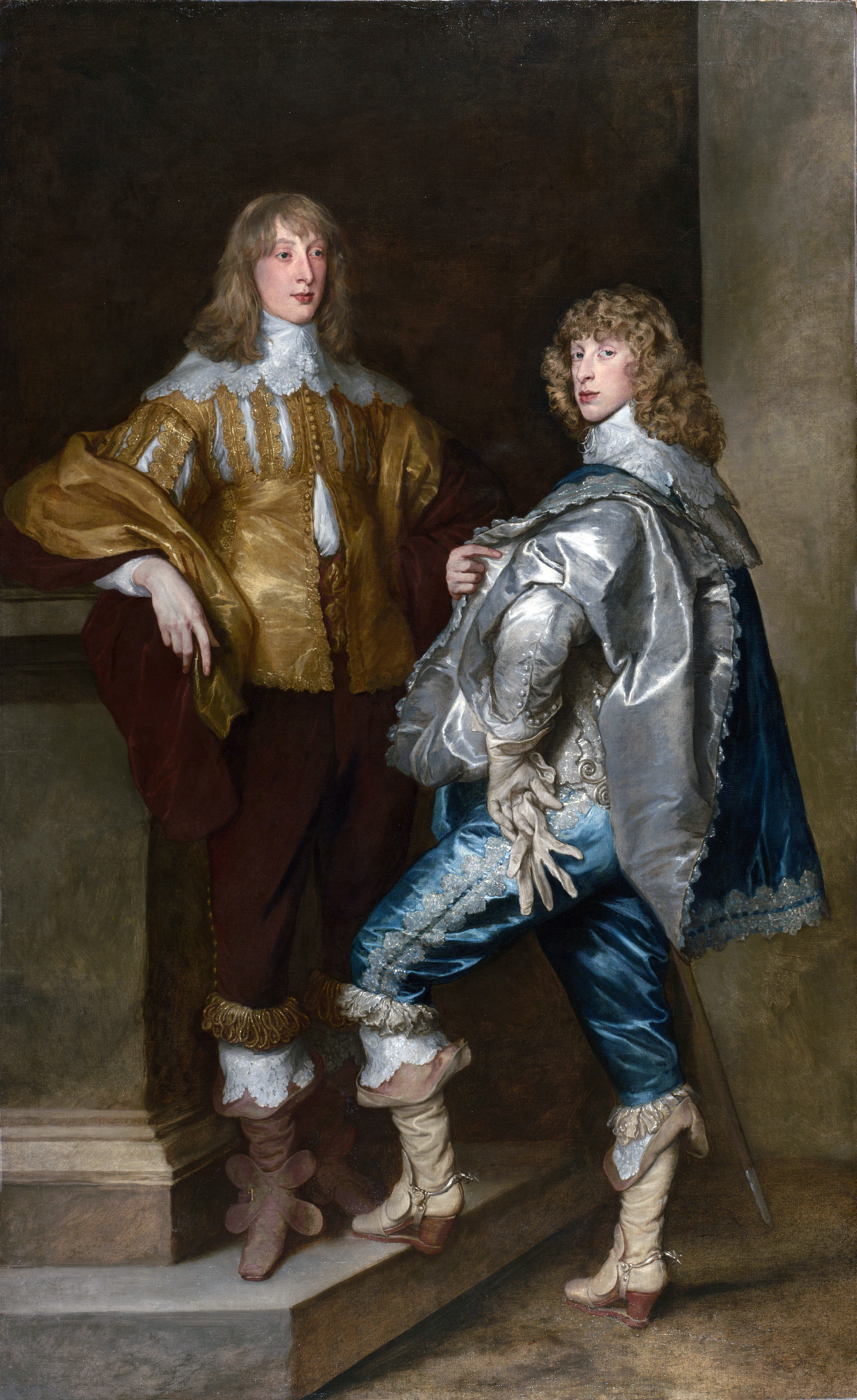
Lord John Stuart and his Brother, Lord Bernard Stuart, c. 1638, by Sir Anthony van Dyck. Both Lord John Stewart and Lord Bernard Stewart died in the English Civil War, fighting on the Royalist side.

Cavalier was not understood at the time as primarily a term describing a style of dress, but a whole political and social attitude. However, in modern times the word has become more particularly associated with the court fashions of the period, which included long flowing hair in ringlets, brightly coloured clothing with elaborate trimmings (i.e., lace collars and cuffs), and plumed hats. This contrasted with the dress of at least the most extreme Roundhead supporters of Parliament, with their preference for shorter hair and plainer dress, although neither side conformed to the stereotypical images entirely.

Most Parliamentarian generals wore their hair at much the same length as their Royalist counterparts, though Cromwell was something of an exception. The best patrons in the nobility of Charles I's court painter Sir Anthony van Dyck, the archetypal recorder of the Cavalier image, all took the Parliamentary side in the Civil War. Probably the most famous image identified as of a "cavalier", Frans Hals' Laughing Cavalier, shows a gentleman from the strongly Calvinist Dutch town of Haarlem, and is dated 1624. These derogatory terms (for at the time they were so intended) also showed what the typical Parliamentarian thought of the Royalist side – capricious men who cared more for vanity than the nation at large.

The chaplain to King Charles I, Edward Simmons described a Cavalier as "a Child of Honour, a Gentleman well borne and bred, that loves his king for conscience sake, of a clearer countenance, and bolder look than other men, because of a more loyal Heart". There were many men in the Royalist armies who fit this description since most of the Royalist field officers were typically in their early thirties, married with rural estates which had to be managed. Although they did not share the same outlook on how to worship God as the English Independents of the New Model Army, God was often central to their lives. This type of Cavalier was personified by Jacob Astley, 1st Baron Astley of Reading, whose prayer at the start of the Battle of Edgehill has become famous "O Lord, Thou knowest how busy I must be this day. If I forget Thee, do not forget me".

At the end of the First Civil War, Astley gave his word that he would not take up arms again against Parliament and having given his word he felt duty bound to refuse to help the Royalist cause in the Second Civil War; however, the word was coined by the Roundheads as a pejorative propaganda image of a licentious, hard drinking and frivolous man, who rarely, if ever, thought of God. It is this image which has survived and many Royalists, for example Henry Wilmot, 1st Earl of Rochester, fitted this description to a tee. Of another Cavalier, George Goring, Lord Goring, a general in the Royalist army, the principal advisor to Charles II, Edward Hyde, 1st Earl of Clarendon, said:

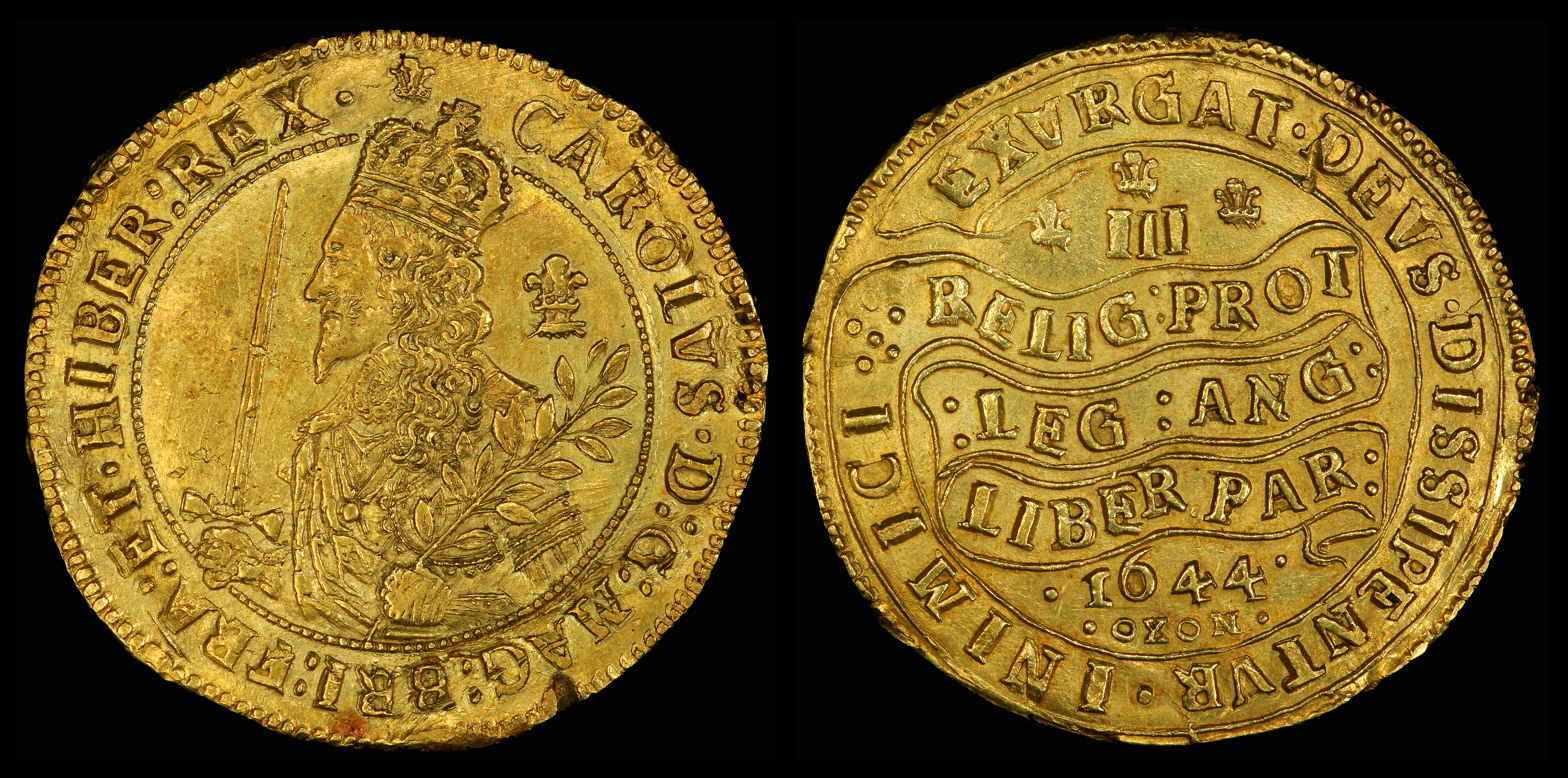
Triple Unite gold coin of 1644: the Latin legend translates as "The Protestant religion, the laws of England, the liberty of Parliament. Let God arise and His enemies be scattered."

[He] would, without hesitation, have broken any trust, or done any act of treachery to have satisfied an ordinary passion or appetite; and in truth wanted nothing but industry (for he had wit, and courage, and understanding and ambition, uncontrolled by any fear of God or man) to have been as eminent and successful in the highest attempt of wickedness as any man in the age he lived in or before. Of all his qualifications dissimulation was his masterpiece; in which he so much excelled, that men were not ordinarily ashamed, or out of countenance, with being deceived but twice by him.

This sense has developed into the modern English use of "cavalier" to describe a recklessly nonchalant attitude, although still with a suggestion of stylishness. Cavalier remained in use as a description for members of the party that supported the monarchy up until the Exclusion Crisis of 1678–1681 when the term was superseded by "Tory" which was another term initially with pejorative connotations. Likewise, during the Exclusion Bill crisis, the term Roundhead was replaced with "Whig", a term introduced by the opponents of the Whigs and also was initially a pejorative term.

== In popular culture ==
Richard Dawkins reports that at his secondary school, Oundle, and another, boys who were circumcised were referred to as "Roundheads" and those who were not as "Cavaliers". Various other sources report the usage, including Prince Harry's memoir Spare.

== In arts ==
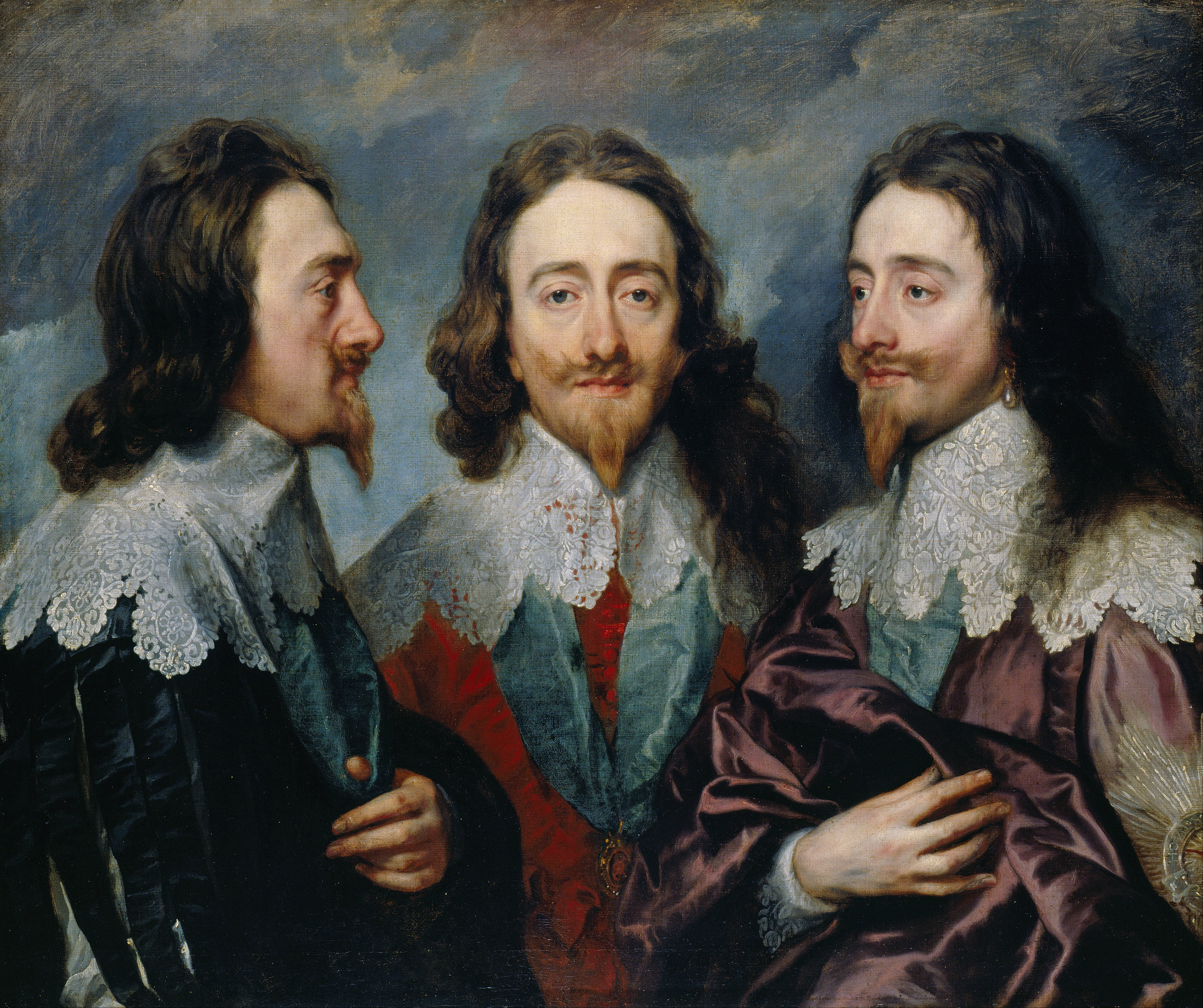
Charles I in Three Positions, the triple portrait of Charles I by Anthony van Dyck

An example of the Cavalier style can be seen in the painting Charles I, King of England, from Three Angles by Anthony van Dyck.

== See also ==
- Virginia Cavaliers (historical)
