= James Stewart, 1st Duke of Richmond =

Scottish peer (1612–1655)

His Grace The Duke of Richmond KG
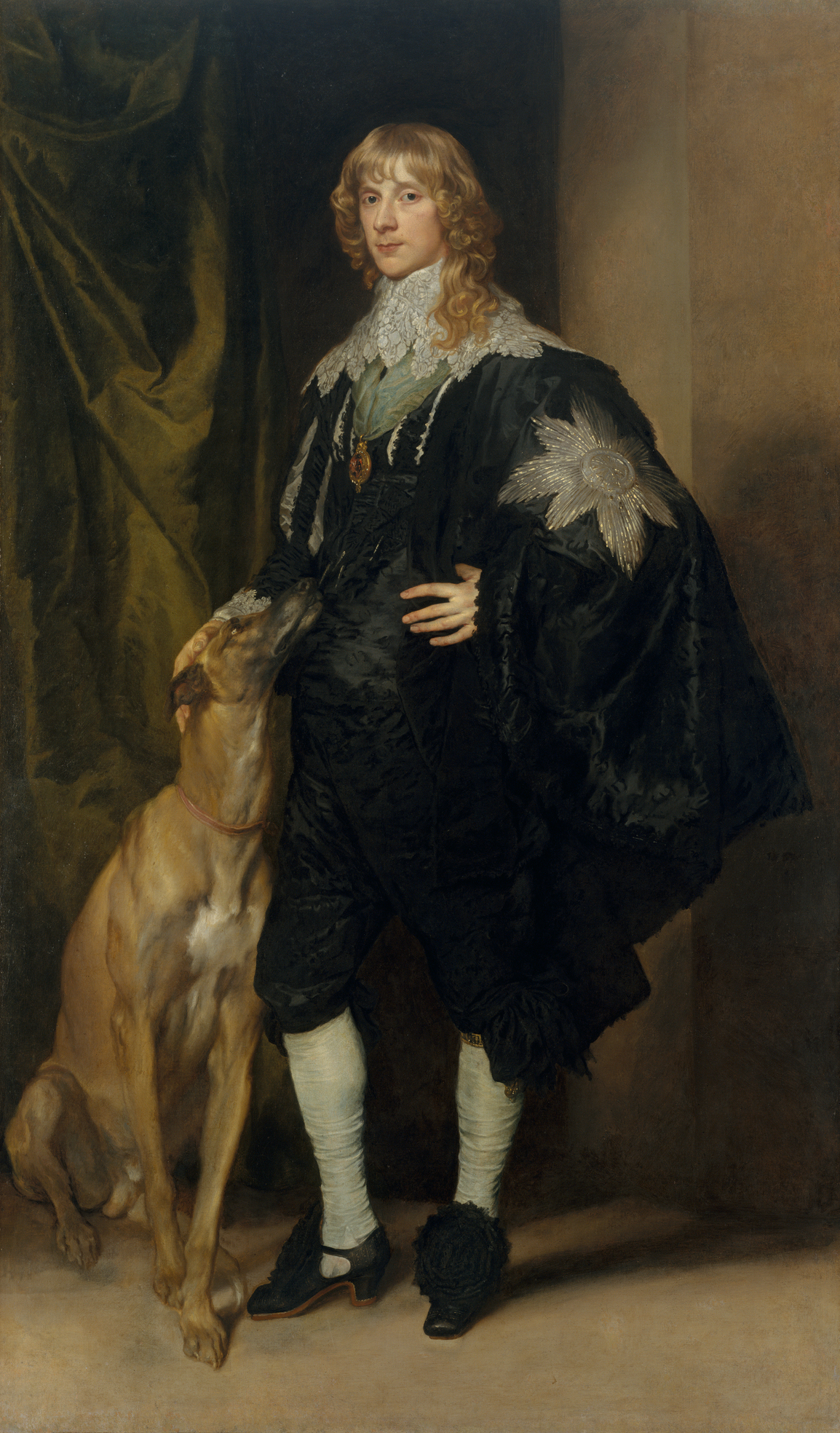
- Portrait by Sir Anthony van Dyck, 1633–1635
- Born: 6 April 1612; Scotland
- Died: 30 March 1655 (aged 42); Scotland

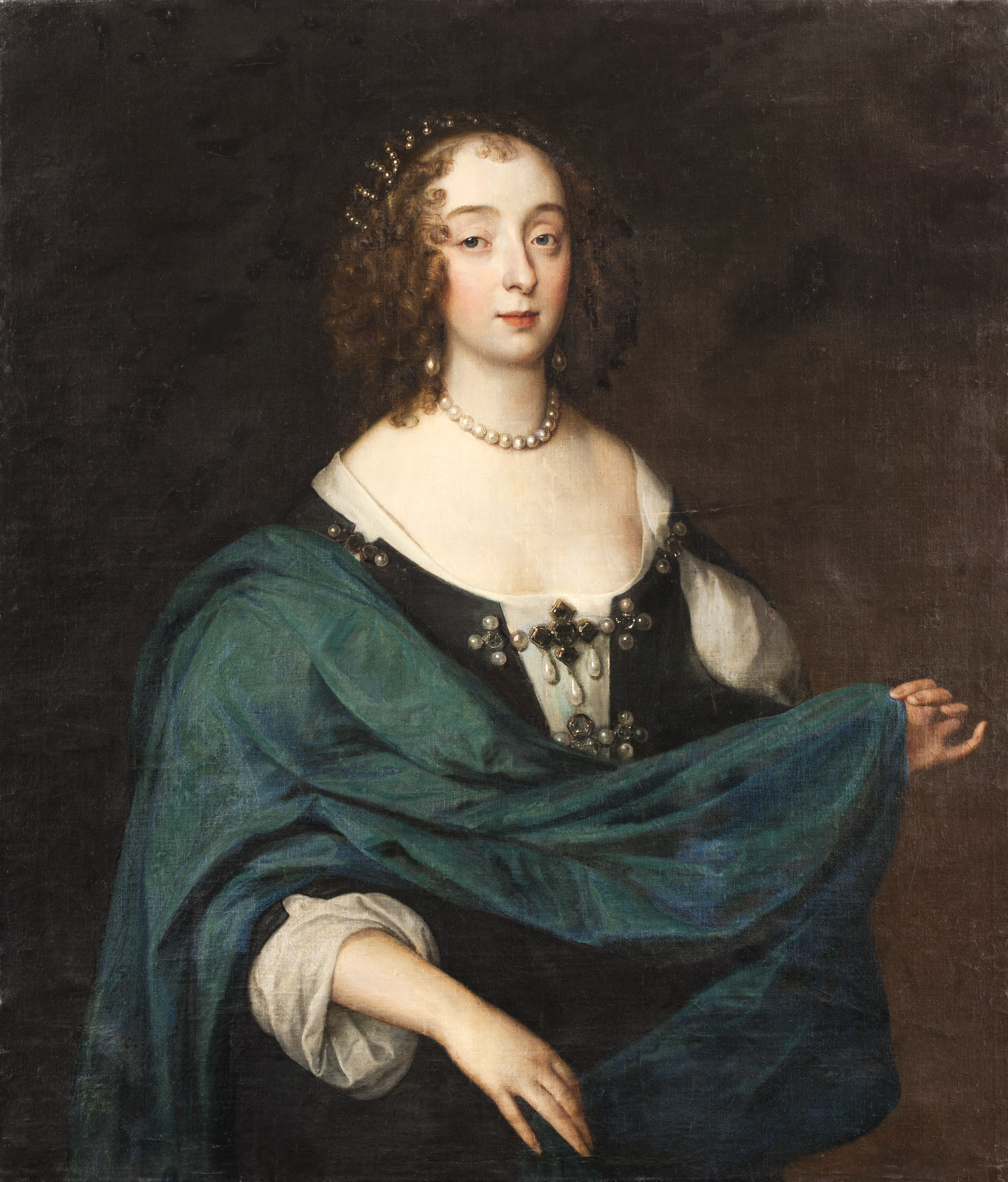
Wife Mary Villiers, Duchess of Richmond and Lennox about 1640, Skokloster Castle

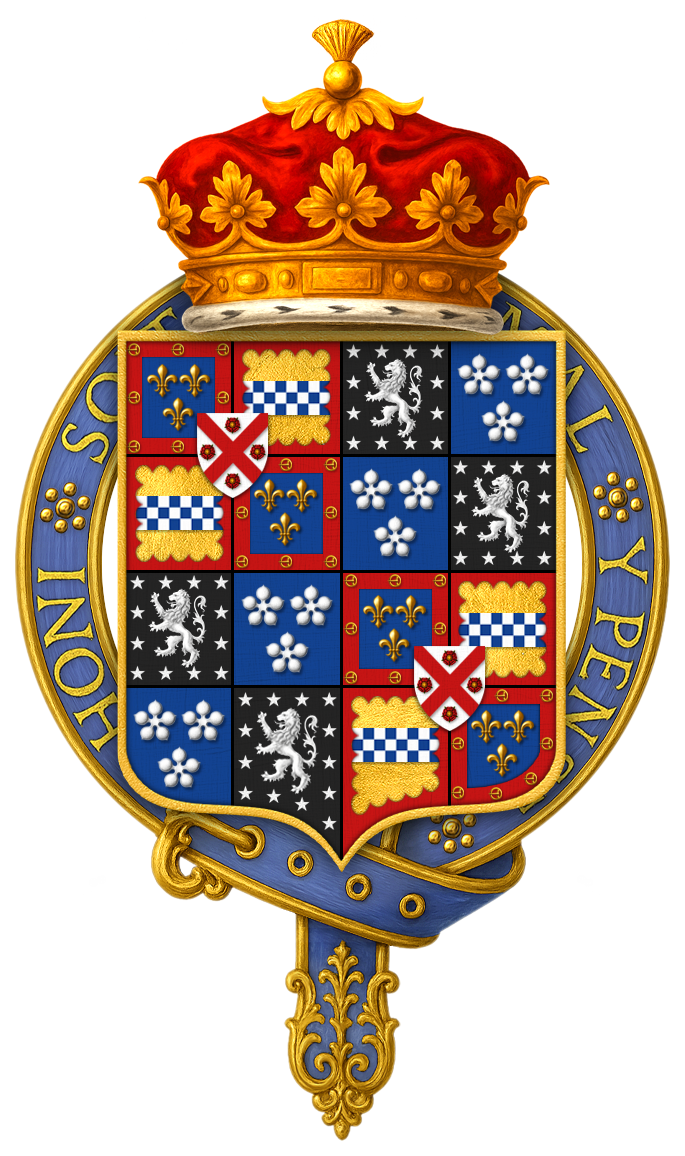
Quartered arms of James Stewart, 1st Duke of Richmond, 4th Duke of Lennox, KG

James Stewart, 1st Duke of Richmond, 4th Duke of Lennox, KG (6 April 1612 – 30 March 1655) was a Scottish peer. A third cousin of King Charles I, he was a Privy Councillor and a key member of the Royalist party in the English Civil War. In 1641–42, he served as Lord Warden of the Cinque Ports. He spent five months in exile in 1643, returning to England to defend the city of Oxford for the king.

== Origins ==
He was the eldest son of Esmé Stewart, 3rd Duke of Lennox (1579–1624) by his wife Katherine Clifton, 2nd Baroness Clifton (c.1592–1637).

== Career ==
He inherited the Dukedom of Lennox on his father's death in 1624 and in 1625, at the age of 13, was made a Gentleman of the Bedchamber to the newly crowned King Charles I, who knighted him on 29 June 1630 and invested him as a knight of Order of the Garter in 1633.

== Dukedom of Richmond ==
The Earldom of Richmond had become absorbed into the crown in 1485 when Henry Tudor, Earl of Richmond, became King Henry VII. The Scottish connection to the Richmond title began in 1613 when James Stewart's uncle Ludovic Stewart, 2nd Duke of Lennox (1574–1624), was created by King James I as Earl of Richmond and was later, in 1623, created by the same king Duke of Richmond and Earl of Newcastle. However he died childless a year later when all his titles (excepting those inherited from his father, namely Duke and Earl of Lennox) became extinct. On 21 August 1637 he was created the 3rd Baron Clifton via his mother.

The title Duke of Richmond was re-created in 1641 by King Charles I for Ludovic's nephew and eventual heir James Stewart, 4th Duke of Lennox, who was also granted Cobham Hall and the manor of Cobham, Kent, which became his main residence.

== Marriage and children ==
On 3 August 1637, he married Mary Villiers, a daughter of George Villiers, 1st Duke of Buckingham, by whom he had issue:

- Esmé Stewart, 2nd Duke of Richmond, 5th Duke of Lennox (1649–1660) who died aged 10 in 1660, whereupon both titles descended to his first-cousin Charles Stewart, 3rd Duke of Richmond, 6th Duke of Lennox (1638–1672).
- Lady Mary Stewart (10 July 1651 – 4 July 1668), Baroness Clifton in 1660; married Richard Butler, 1st Earl of Arran. No issue.

== Death and burial ==
He died on 30 March 1655 aged 42 and was buried in Westminster Abbey.

== See also ==
- Lord Bernard Stewart (younger brother)
- Siege of Oxford

== Notes ==
Honorary titles
Preceded by The Earl of Portland	Lord Lieutenant of Hampshire jointly with The Earl of Southampton 1641–1646 and The Earl of Portland; 1635–1646	Succeeded by Interregnum
Political offices
Preceded by The Earl of Suffolk	Lord Warden of the Cinque Ports; 1641–1642	Succeeded by Sir Edward Boys
Peerage of Scotland
Preceded by Esmé Stewart	Duke of Lennox; 1624–1655	Succeeded by Esmé Stewart
Peerage of England
New creation	Duke of Richmond; 1641–1655	Succeeded by Esmé Stewart
Preceded by Katherine Clifton	Baron Clifton; 1637–1655	Succeeded by Esmé Stewart
