= Charles Stewart, 3rd Duke of Richmond =

English peer (1513–1672)

His Grace The Duke of Richmond KG
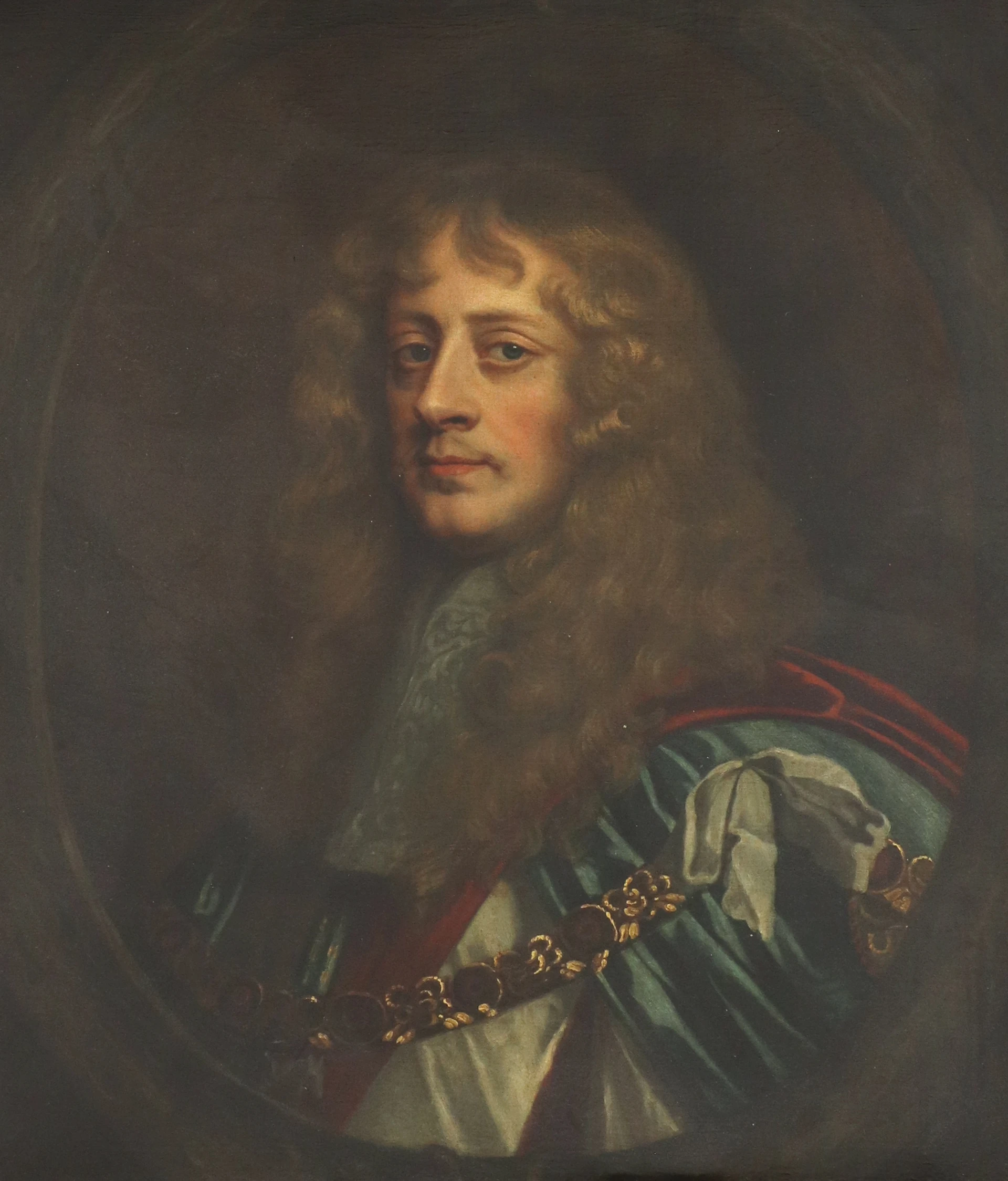
- Portrait after Sir Peter Lely

Lord Lieutenant of Kent
- In office 1668–1672
- Preceded by: The Earl of Winchilsea; The Earl of Southampton
- Succeeded by: The Earl of Winchilsea

Personal details
- Born: 7 March 1639 England
- Died: December 1672 (aged 33) Helsingør, Denmark-Norway
- Spouses: Elizabeth Rogers (m. 1659, died) Margaret Banaster Lewis (m. 1662; died 1666) Frances Teresa Stewart (m. 1667)
- Parent(s): George Stewart, 9th Seigneur d'Aubigny; Lady Katherine Howard
- Relatives: Theophilus Howard, 2nd Earl of Suffolk (grandfather); Esmé Stewart, 3rd Duke of Lennox (grandfather)

Charles Stewart, 3rd Duke of Richmond KG (7 March 1639 – December 1672) was an English peer who was the fourth cousin of Charles II of England, being both descended in the male line from John Stewart, 3rd Earl of Lennox.

== Early life ==
He was the only son and heir of George Stewart, 9th Seigneur d'Aubigny by his wife Lady Katherine Howard, a daughter of Theophilus Howard, 2nd Earl of Suffolk. He was a grandson of Esmé Stewart, 3rd Duke of Lennox.

== Career ==
On 10 December 1645, he was created Baron Stuart of Newbury, Berkshire, and Earl of Lichfield, titles conferred on him "to perpetuate the titles which were intended to have been conferred on his uncle" Lord Bernard Stewart, youngest son of the Duke of Lennox, who had been killed in the Battle of Rowton Heath in the English Civil War in September of that year.

In January 1658, Charles Stewart went into exile in France, and took up his residence in the house of his uncle, Ludovic Stewart, 10th Seigneur d'Aubigny. In the following year he fell under the displeasure of The Protectorate's Council of State, and warrants were issued for seizing his person and goods.

He returned to England with King Charles II in 1660, on the Restoration of the Monarchy and sat in the Convention Parliament, showing great animosity towards the supporters of the Commonwealth. On the death of his 10-year-old cousin Esmé Stewart on 10 August 1660, He succeeded as 3rd Duke of Richmond and 6th Duke of Lennox. In that same year he was created Hereditary Great Chamberlain of Scotland, Hereditary Great Admiral of Scotland, and Lord Lieutenant of Dorset. On 15 April 1661 he was invested with the Order of the Garter.

Around 1660 he built Richmond House on the site of the bowling green of Henry VIII's Palace of Whitehall. He also owned (and extended) Cobham Hall in the County of Kent.

On the death of his uncle, Ludovic Stuart, he succeeded him as 12th Seigneur D'Aubigny, for which title he did homage by proxy to King Louis XIV of France on 11 May 1670. In July 1667, on the death of his cousin, Mary Butler, countess of Arran, he became Baron Clifton. On 4 May 1668 he was made Lord Lieutenant and Vice Admiral of Kent, jointly with Heneage Finch, 3rd Earl of Winchilsea, and commanded one of the regiments of Kent Militia

In 1671 he was sent as ambassador to the Danish court to persuade Denmark to join England and France in a projected attack on the Dutch Republic. Whilst there at Elsinore in 1672 he died by drowning, aged 33.

== Personal life ==
Charles Stewart married three times, but had no children. Firstly, after June 1659, to Elizabeth Rogers, and after her death, secondly, on 31 March 1662, to Margaret Banaster, widow of William Lewis, who died in 1666.

His third marriage was in March 1667, to Frances Teresa Stewart (1647–1702), granddaughter of Walter Stewart, 1st Lord Blantyre, known at court as "La Belle Stuart" who had been desired by Richmond's cousin, King Charles II, as a mistress.

Richmond died in December 1672 and was buried in Westminster Abbey on 20 September 1673. As he died without issue, his titles became extinct, with the exception of that of Baron Clifton, which passed with most of his property to his sister Katherine, Lady O'Brien. His wife, however, had been granted the Lennox estates for life. In 1675, the titles Duke of Richmond, Duke of Lennox and Earl of March, were resurrected for Charles Lennox, 1st Duke of Richmond and Lennox, the illegitimate son of King Charles II by his mistress Louise de Kérouaille.

== See also ==
- Earl of Lichfield
- Baron Clifton

Honorary titles
Interregnum	Lord Lieutenant of Dorset; 1660–1672	Succeeded by The Lord Ashley
Preceded by The Earl of Winchilsea; The Earl of Southampton	Lord Lieutenant of Kent; 1668–1672	Succeeded by The Earl of Winchilsea
Vacant Title last held by Sir Thomas Walsingham	Vice-Admiral of Kent; 1668–1672	Succeeded by The Earl of Winchilsea
Peerage of Scotland
Preceded by Esmé Stewart	Duke of Lennox; 1660–1672	Extinct
Peerage of England
Preceded by Esmé Stewart	Duke of Richmond; 1660–1672	Extinct
New creation	Earl of Lichfield; 1645–1672	Extinct
Preceded by Mary Butler	Baron Clifton; 1668–1672	Succeeded by Katherine O'Brien
