= Plaza Vieja, Havana =

Square in Old Havana, Cuba

Coordinates: 23°8′9.88″N 82°21′0.22″W

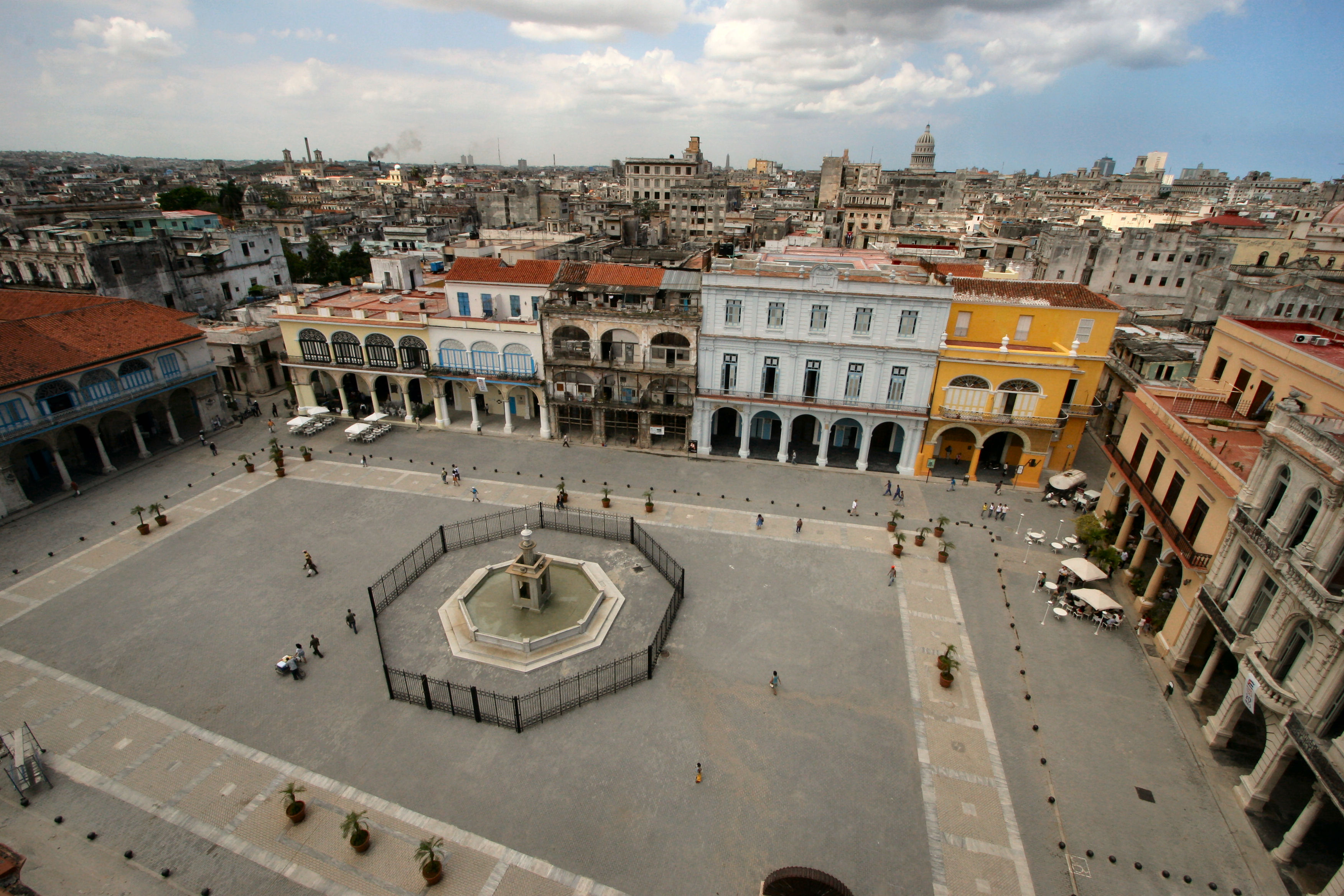
- Interactive map of the Plaza Vieja, Havana area

The Plaza Vieja (lit. 'Old Square') is a plaza located in Old Havana, Cuba. The plaza and its surroundings are also one of the seven consejos populares (wards) of the municipality of Old Havana. It has a residential population of 17,426.

== Overview ==
The plaza was originally called Plaza Nueva (New Square). It emerged as an open space in 1559, after the Plaza de Armas and San Francisco. In colonial times it was a residential neighborhood of the Criollo plutocracy.

Plaza Vieja was the site of executions, processions, bullfights, and fiestas - all witnessed by Havana's wealthiest citizens, who looked on from their balconies.

The urban architectural complex of Plaza Vieja is represented by valuable colonial buildings from the XVII, XVIII and XIX and some examples of the early twentieth century.

== History ==
=== Early history ===
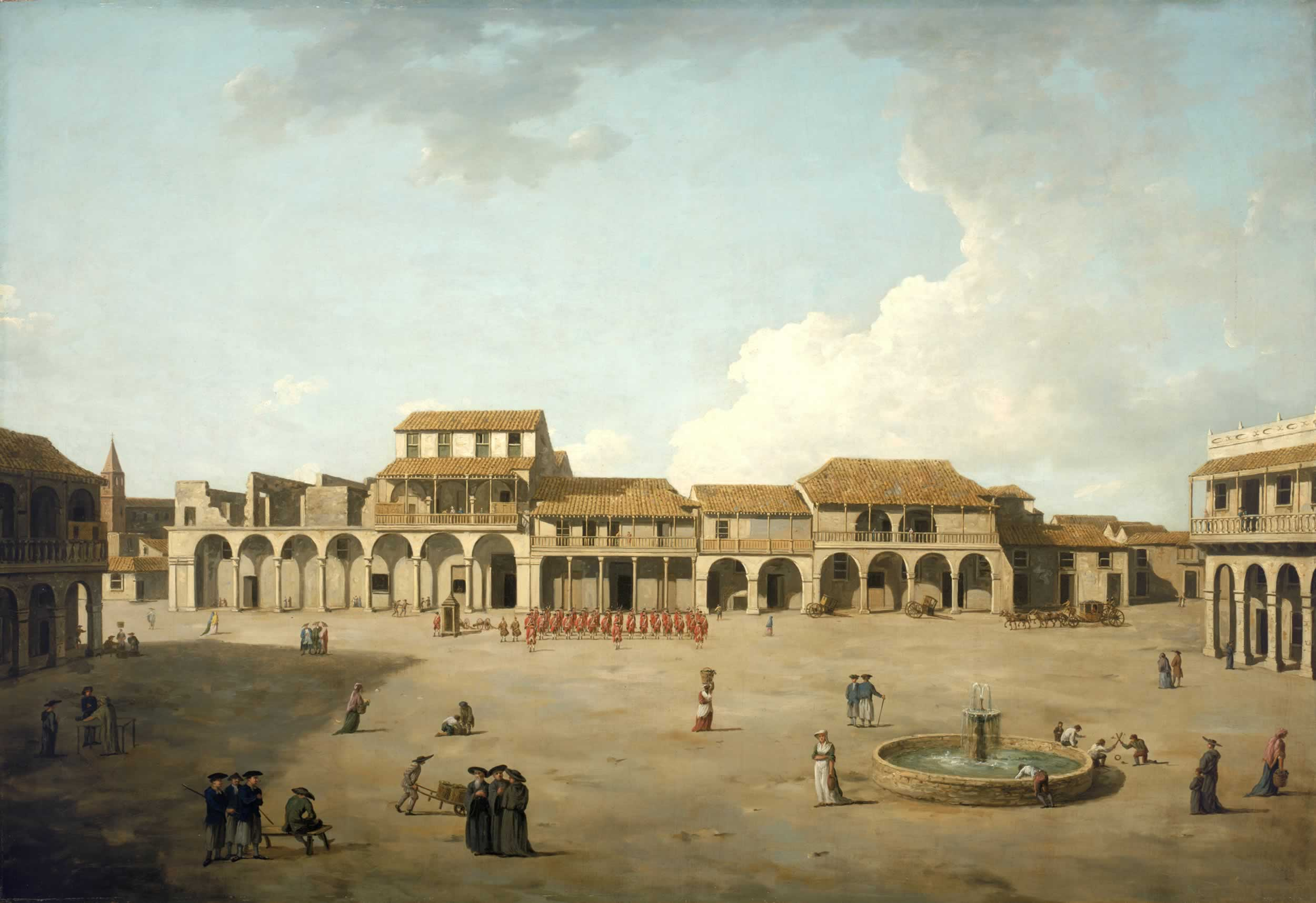
The Piazza at Havana by Dominic Serres. The plaza during British occupation in 1762.

The plaza emerged in 1559 and was originally called Plaza Nueva (New Square). It was built as a popular alternative to Plaza de Armas, the military and government main center, the name changed when another important square emerged in town, the Plaza del Santo Cristo.

In the eighteenth century the square was turned into a popular market, and was called Plaza del Mercado (Market Square) as Havana's commercial hub. In 1814 with the birth of the Mercado Nuevo (new market) in the Plaza del Cristo, the Old Square was renamed to differentiate it. The square has also been identified by other names such as Plaza Real, Mayor, Mercado, Fernando VII, Plaza of the Constitution, Park Juan Bruno Zayas and Park Julian Grimau.

In 1851 members of the defeated filibustering Lopez Expedition were executed in the square.

=== 20th century ===
The original Carrara marble fountain surrounded by four dolphins was demolished in the 1930s when President Gerardo Machado (1871–1939) built an underground parking lot here.

Since the early 1980s, once Old Havana was declared World Heritage Site by Unesco, architects and restorers began a restoration project.
