= Washington at Princeton =

1779 painting by Charles Willson Peale

Washington At Princeton
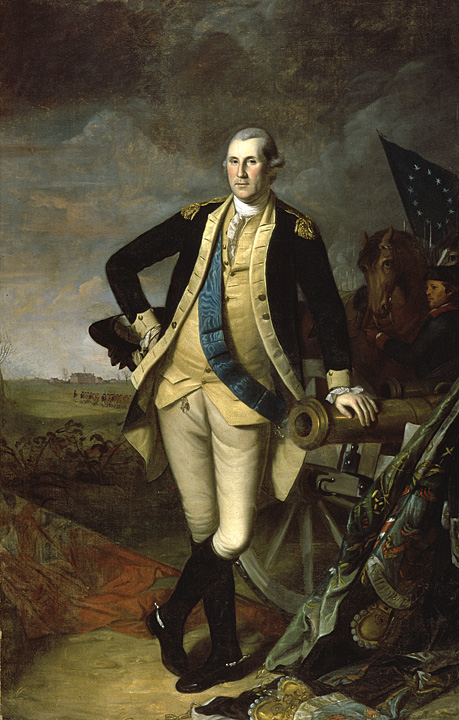
- Artist: Charles Willson Peale
- Year: 1779
- Medium: Oil on canvas
- Subject: George Washington
- Dimensions: 236.2 cm x 148.6 cm (93 in x 58.5 in)
- Owner: Pennsylvania Academy Of The Fine Arts

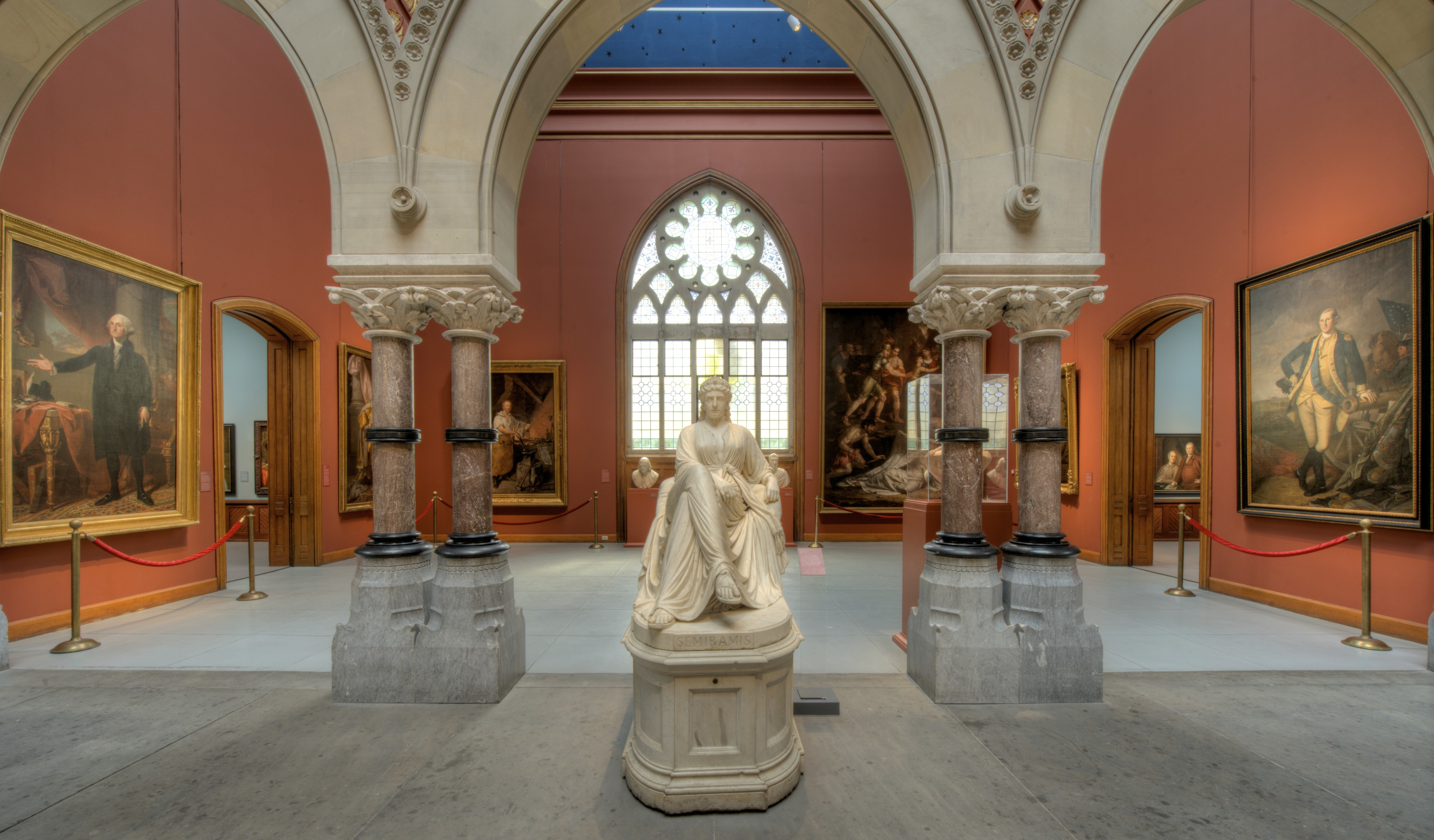
Charles Willson Peale's Washington at Princeton (on the right) sold for $21.5 million in 2005, the most ever paid in U.S. history for a portrait.

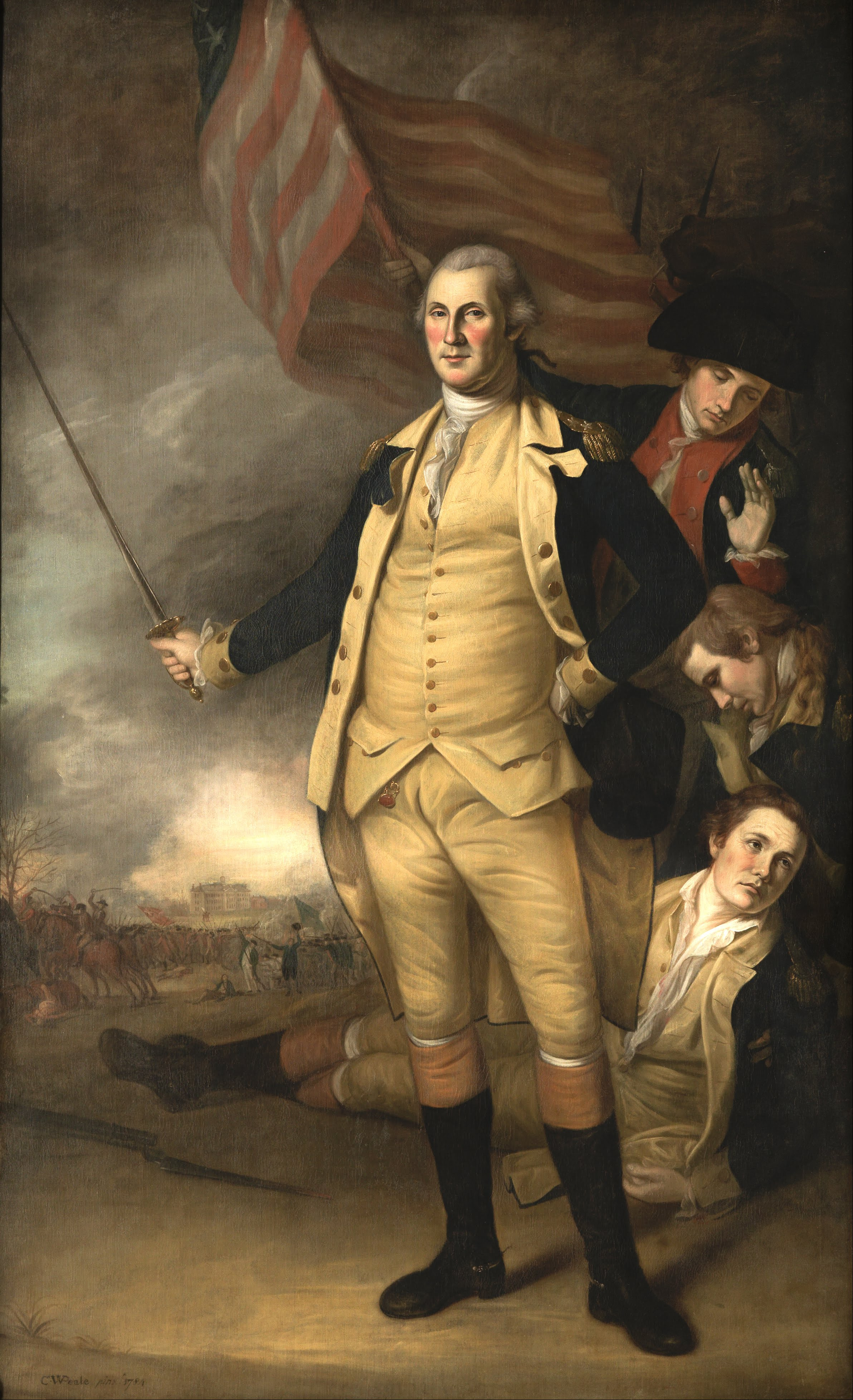
George Washington at the Battle of Princeton (1783)

Washington at Princeton is a 1779 painting by American painter Charles Willson Peale, showing George Washington after the 1777 Battle of Princeton. The original was commissioned by the Supreme Executive Council of Pennsylvania for its council chamber in Independence Hall in Philadelphia. Peale made eight copies of the painting. The original, now owned by the Pennsylvania Academy of the Fine Arts in Philadelphia, was completed in early 1779, when Washington sat for Peale in Philadelphia.

In January 2006, the painting sold for $21.3 million, the highest price ever paid for an American portrait at the time. (This record has since been broken by an Andy Warhol portrait of Marilyn Monroe.) Seven of the paintings are presently housed in U.S. institutions, including the United States Senate, the Metropolitan Museum of Art in New York City, the Yale University Art Gallery in New Haven, Connecticut, the National Portrait Gallery in Washington, D.C., Colonial Williamsburg, the Pennsylvania Academy of the Fine Arts, and Nassau Hall at Princeton University, where it is titled George Washington after the Battle of Princeton.

Peale based the composition of the picture on Thomas Gainsborough's Portrait of Augustus Hervey which he had seen at the Exhibition of 1768 in London.

== Copies of 1779 painting ==
The success of George Washington at Princeton led to orders for as many replicas of the painting. In August 1779 Peale wrote: "I have on hand a number of portraits of Gen. Washington. One the ambassador had for the Court of France, another is done for the Spanish Court, one other has been sent to the island of Cuba, and sundry others, which I have on hand are for private gentlemen." Copies of the painting vary in size and background, but they all feature Washington in the same posture leaning on the cannon, with a horse and a soldier in the back. Some are full-length, as the original, and some are three-quarter length. Other versions reside at the Palace of Versailles, the Virginia Museum of Fine Arts, and Cleveland Museum of Art.

== 1783 painting ==
The Princeton University Art Museum displays another original Peale painting, George Washington at the Battle of Princeton, which was commissioned in 1783 by the Trustees of the then College of New Jersey, now Princeton University, the year that Nassau Hall served as the temporary U.S. Capitol. That painting, which used to hang in the Faculty Room of Nassau Hall, is displayed in a frame (with crown removed) which previously contained a portrait of King George II, which had been hung in the very same room during the Battle of Princeton and was damaged (decapitated) by a cannonball. The location of the two Peale portraits of Washington owned by Princeton University was swapped in 2015.

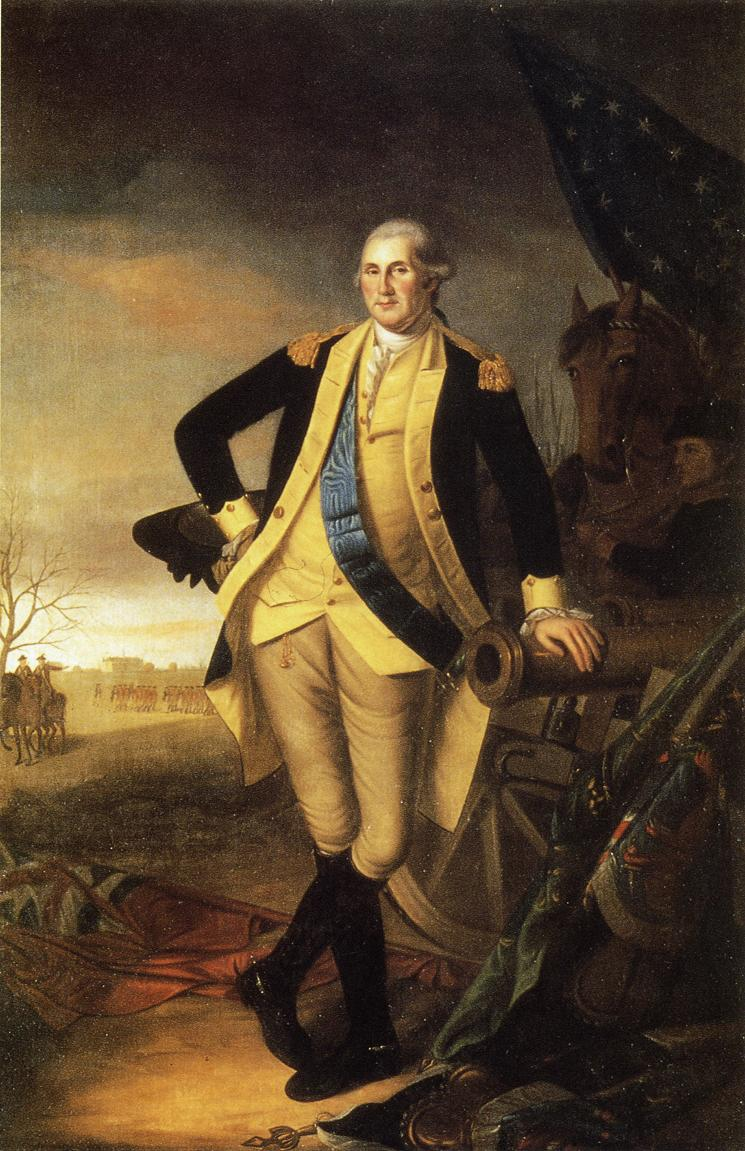
Copy at Princeton University Art Museum

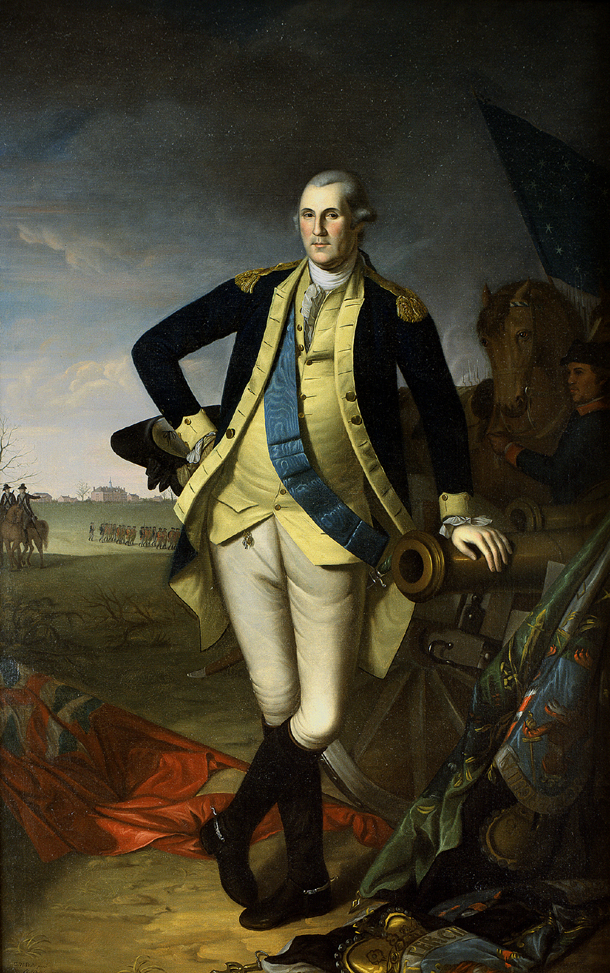
Copy at United States Senate

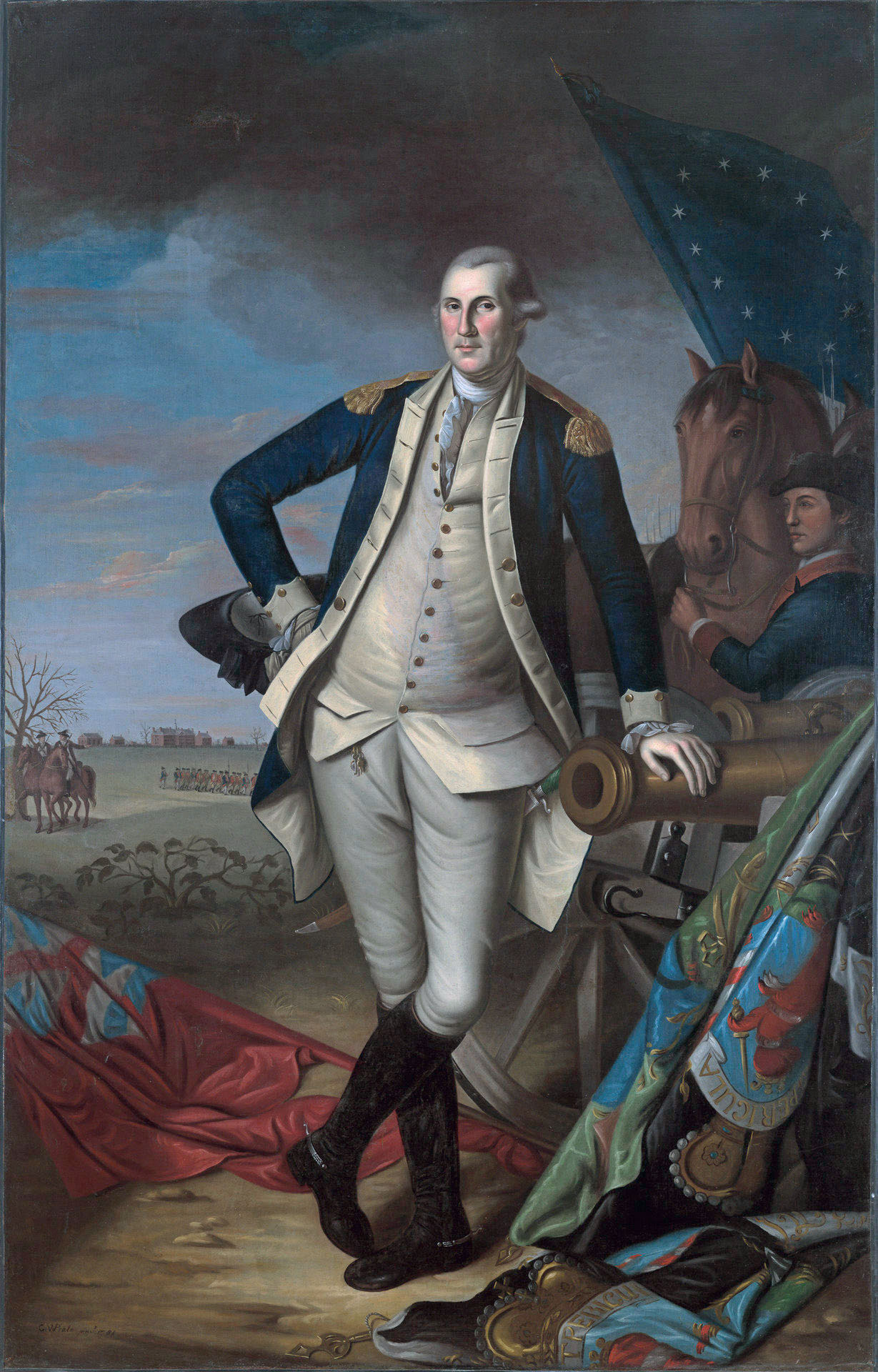
Copy at Yale University Art Gallery

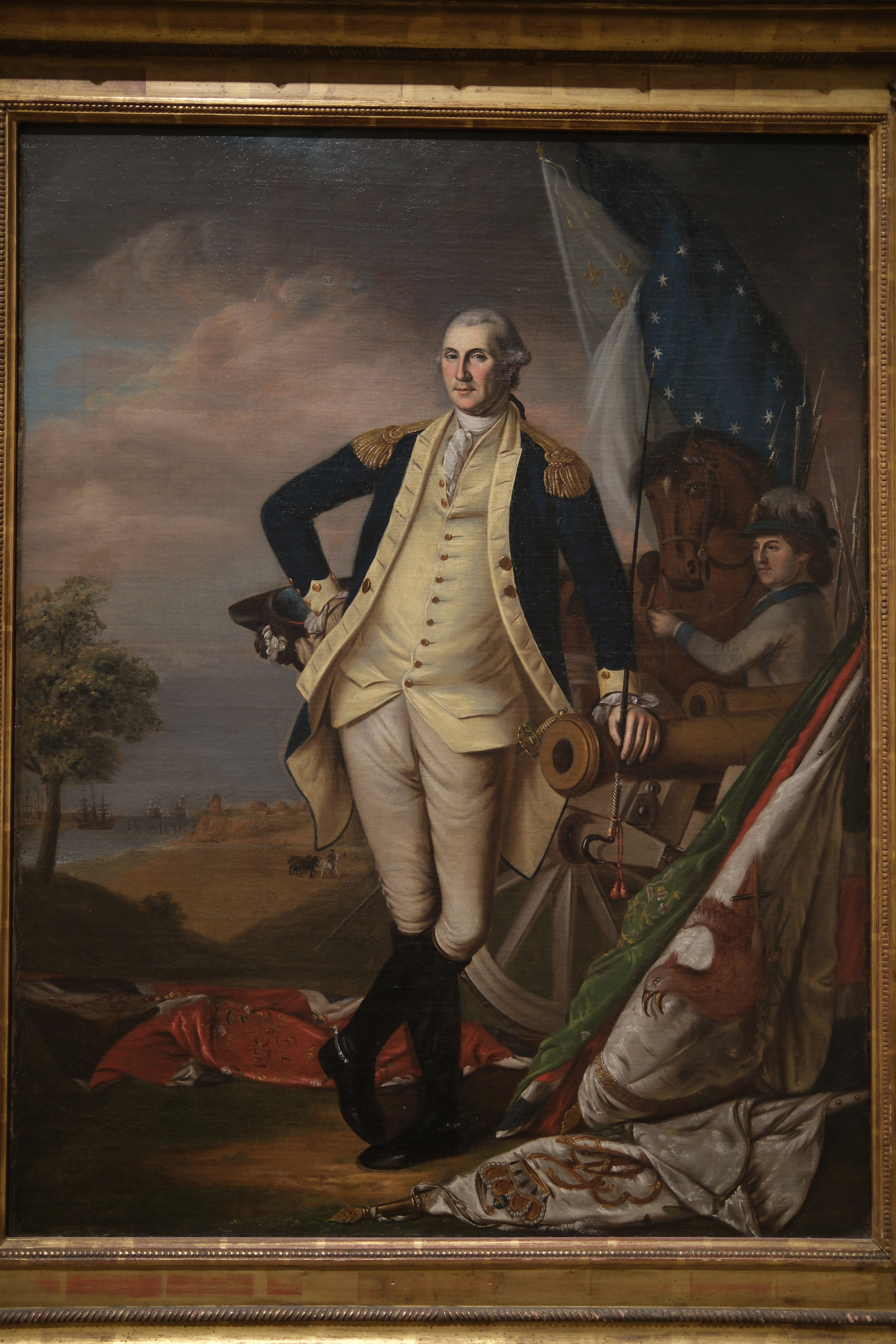
Copy at Metropolitan Museum of Art

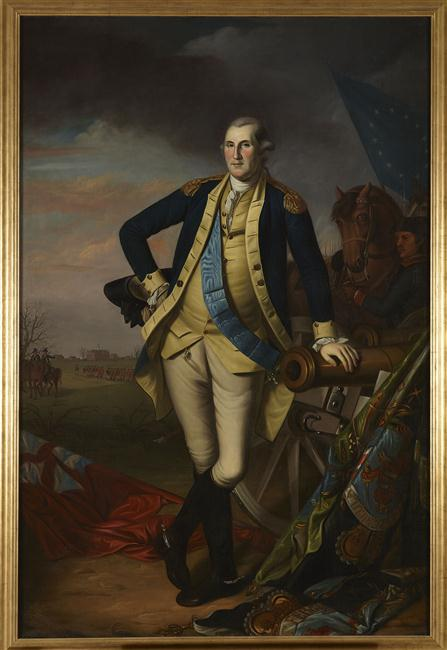
Copy at Palace of Versailles

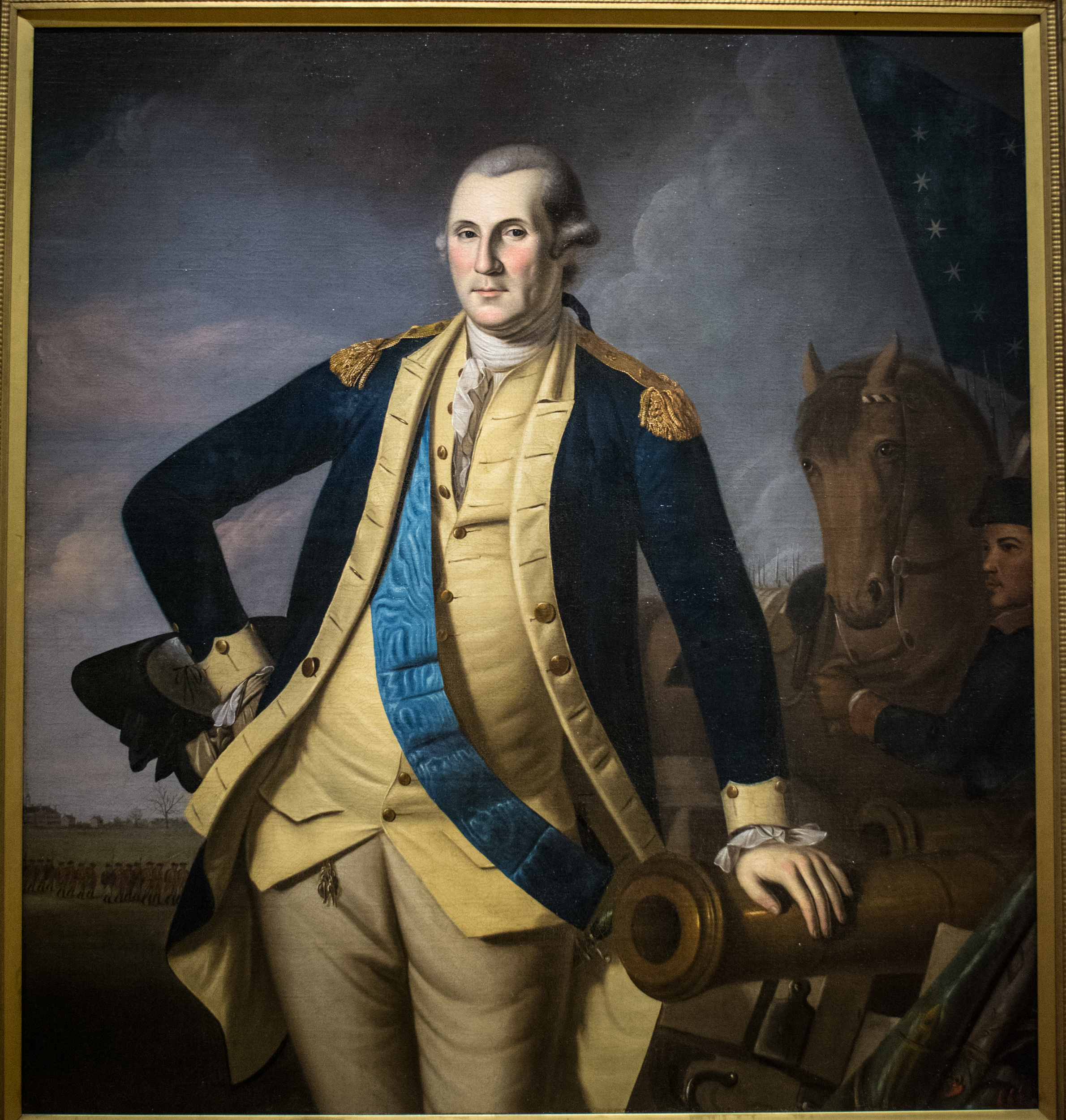
Three-quarter length copy at Cleveland Museum of Art

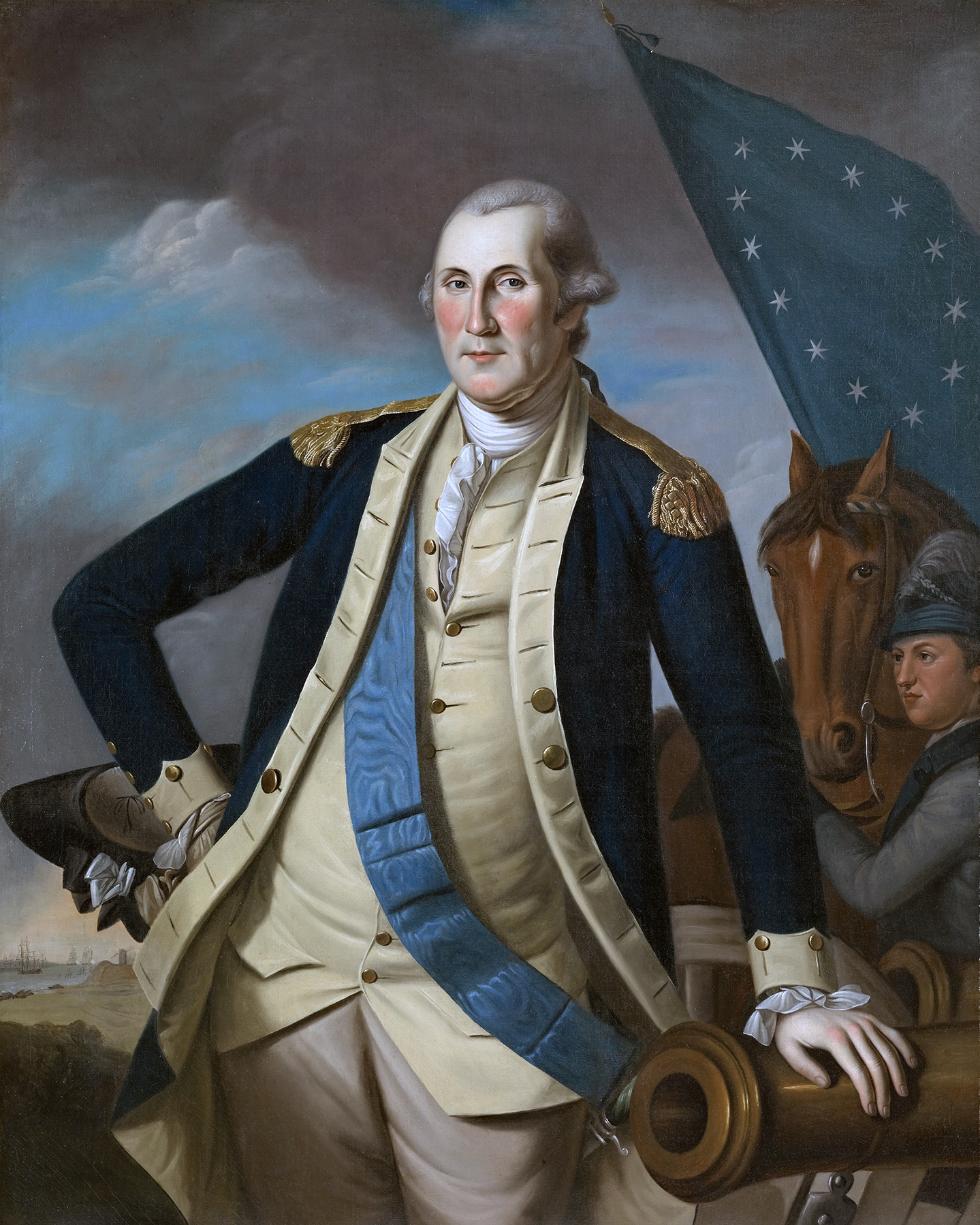
Three-quarter length copy at Crystal Bridges Museum of American Art

== See also ==
- List of paintings of George Washington
