= Portrait of Augustus Hervey =

1767 painting by Thomas Gainsborough

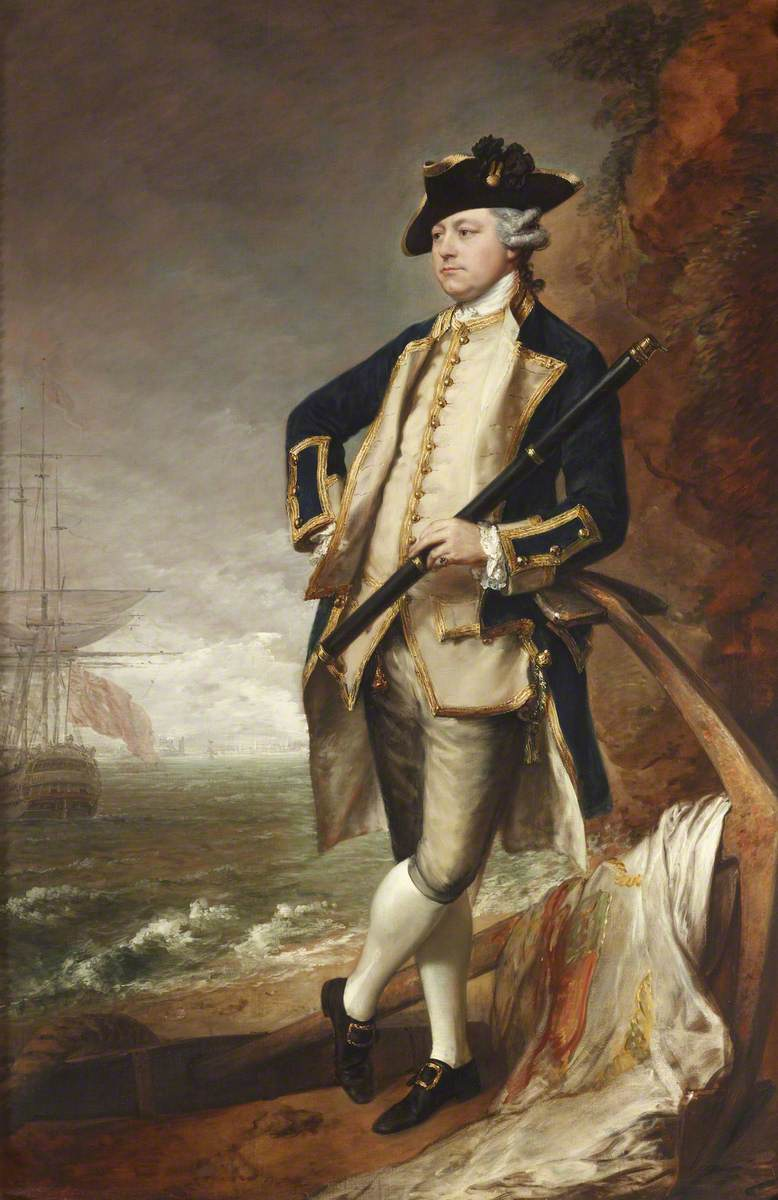
- Artist: Thomas Gainsborough
- Year: 1767
- Type: Oil on canvas, portrait painting
- Dimensions: 232 cm × 152.5 cm (91 in × 60.0 in)
- Location: Ickworth House

Portrait of Augustus Hervey is an oil on canvas portrait painting by the British artist Thomas Gainsborough, from 1767. It is held at Ickworth House, in Suffolk.

== History and description ==
It depicts the Royal Navy officer and politician Augustus Hervey. He is shown at full-length in the uniform of a commodore. He later succeeded his brother as Earl of Bristol in 1775. The painting, produced in the grand manner style, makes reference to his device during the 1762 Siege of Havana during the Seven Years' War. Hervey is shown on a seashore leaning on an anchor, with a captured Spanish naval flag at his feet, Behind him is HMS Dragon, the ship of the line he had commanded, and in the distance is the Morro fortress of Havana which was bombarded and stormed by the British in 1762.

The work was likely to have been produced in the fashionable spa town of Bath where Gainsborough had his studio at the time. The painting was displayed at the Exhibition of 1768 held by the Society of Artists in London. The American artist Charles Willson Peale, who also exhibited at the society that year, used the stance as the model for his 1779 portrait Washington at Princeton.

The painting is in the collection of Ickworth House, in Suffolk, the historic residence of the Earls of Bristol now in the control of the National Trust.

== Bibliography ==
- Ingamells, John. National Portrait Gallery Mid-Georgian Portraits, 1760–1790. National Portrait Gallery, 2004.
- Kloss, William. United States Senate Catalogue of Fine Art. U.S. Government Printing Office, 2005.
- Wilton, Andrew. The Swagger Portrait: Grand Manner Portraiture in Britain from Van Dyck to Augustus John, 1630-1930. Tate Gallery, 1992.
