= Exhibition of 1768 =

1768 art exhibition in London

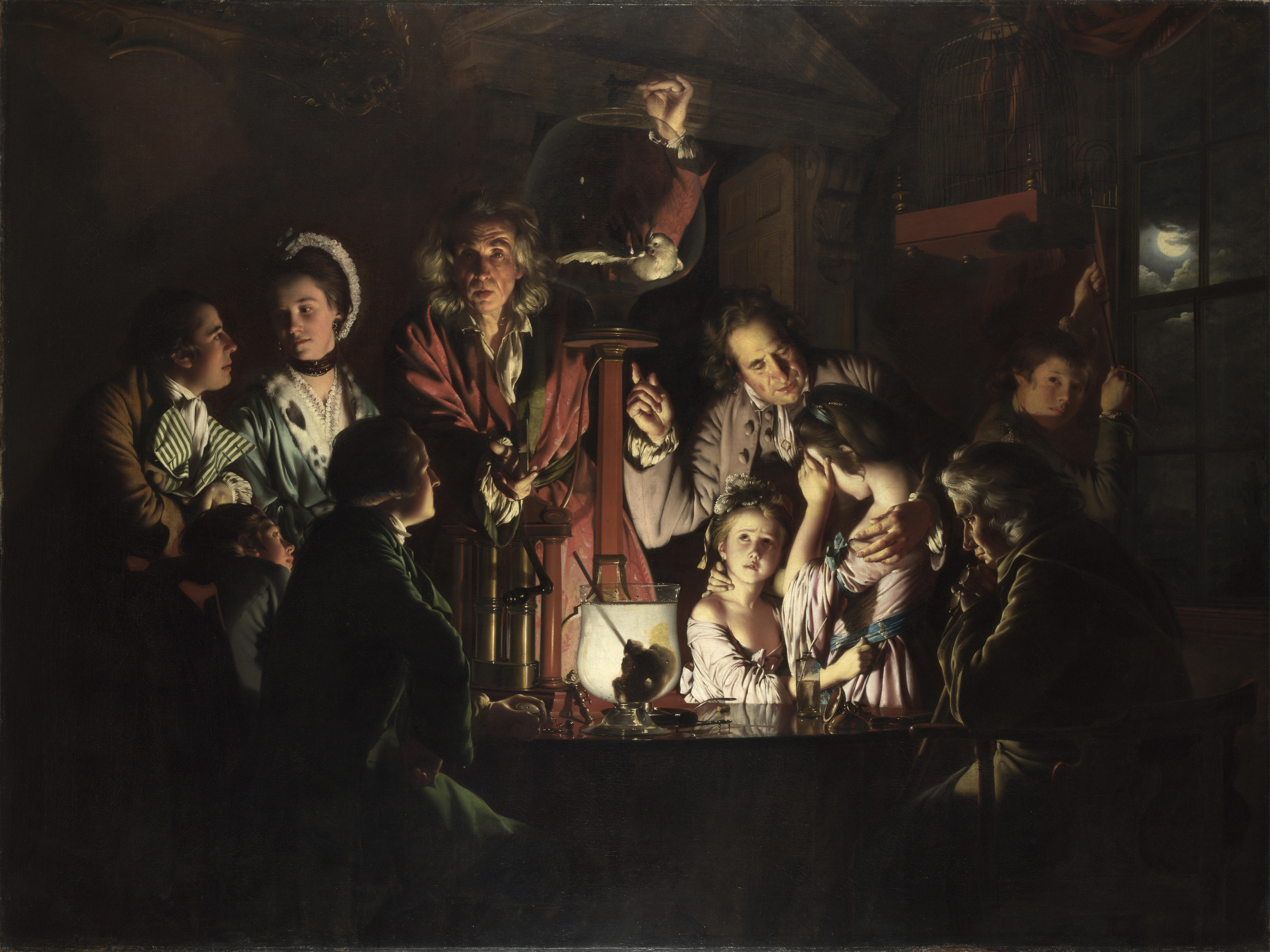
An Experiment on a Bird in the Air Pump by Joseph Wright of Derby

The Exhibition of 1768 was an art exhibition held at Spring Gardens in London from 28 April to 27 May 1768. It was organised by the Society of Artists of Great Britain which included many leading painters, sculptors and architects of the mid-Georgian era. The Society had been holding annual shows at Spring Gardens since the Exhibition of 1761, but this was the last held before a major split in the organisation led to the formation of the breakaway Royal Academy.

== Exhibition ==
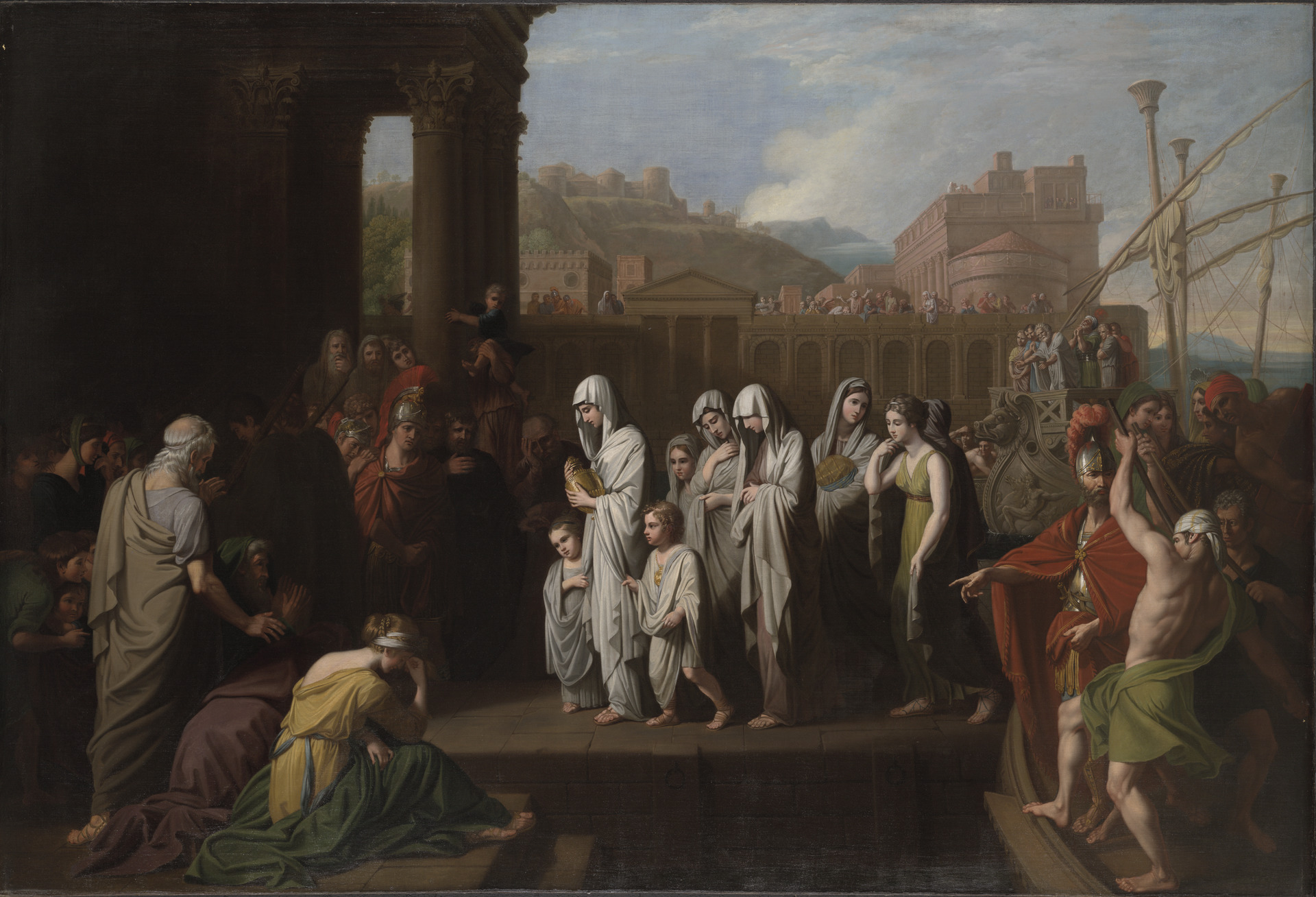
Agrippina Landing at Brundisium by Benjamin West

The exhibition featured over 320 works produced by more than 200 artists. Joshua Reynolds, having missed the Exhibition of 1767, returned with Crossing the Brook featuring the five-year old niece of the actress Peg Woffington carrying a pet dog. His rival Thomas Gainsborough also appeared with portraits of Thomas Needham and the naval officer Augustus Hervey. Dominic Serres displayed The Captured Spanish Fleet at Havana, a naval scene depicting the recent Seven Years' War. Edward Penny (with his The Generous Behaviour of the Chevalier Bayard) and Francis Hayman only submitted a single work each. By contrast, Benjamin West displayed several pictures including the history paintings Agrippina Landing at Brundisium and Venus and Europa. His fellow American Charles Willson Peale submitted four works, three of them miniatures.

Along with West's Agrippina the work that attracted the greatest interest and praise with Joseph Wright of Derby's An Experiment on a Bird in the Air Pump. John Singleton Copley displayed his A Boy with a Flying Squirrel, a work he had previously submitted to the Exhibition of 1766.

== Aftermath ==
In September 1768, the Society organised a special exhibition held in honour of Christian VII of Denmark, the brother-in-law of George III, who was visiting London. Lasting two days and not open to the public, it featured paintings from leading members. It was the last exhibition held before a major split among Society members that led to the creation of a new rival organisation, the Royal Academy of Arts, which secured backing from the king. Two leaders of the dispute were rival architects James Paine and William Chambers.

Joshua Reynolds, absent in France during much of the dispute, was elected the first President of the Royal Academy. The breakaway group involved many of the most successful members of the Society. They staged the inaugural Royal Academy Exhibition of 1769 in Pall Mall which proved a success. Despite this, the Society held its own major exhibitions in 1769 and 1770 and even started work on a new headquarters in the Strand. However, further defections of prominent artists to the Royal Academy weakened it and, by the mid-1770s, it was in sharp decline and ceased regular exhibitions, finally disbanding in 1791.

== Gallery ==
The Captured Spanish Fleet at Havana by Dominic Serres

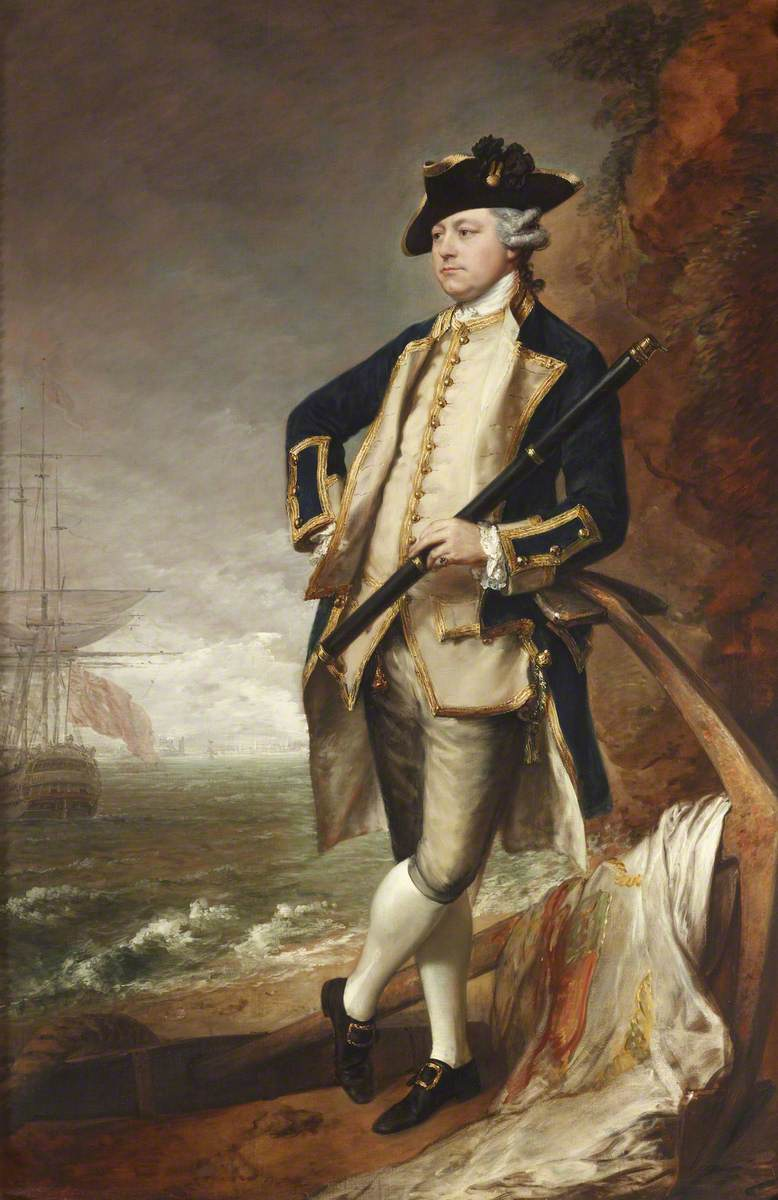
Portrait of Augustus Hervey by Thomas Gainsborough

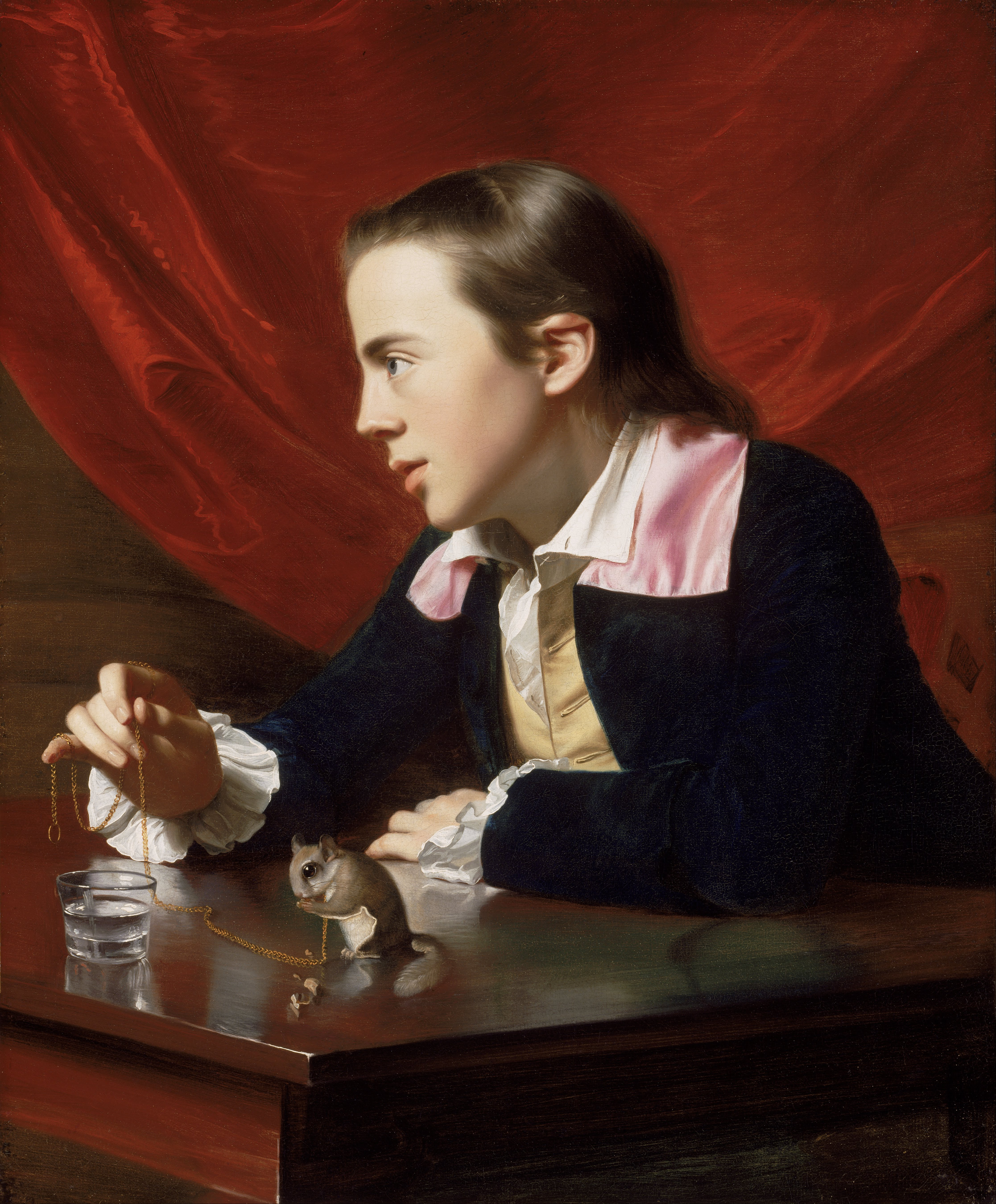
A Boy with a Flying Squirrel by John Singleton Copley

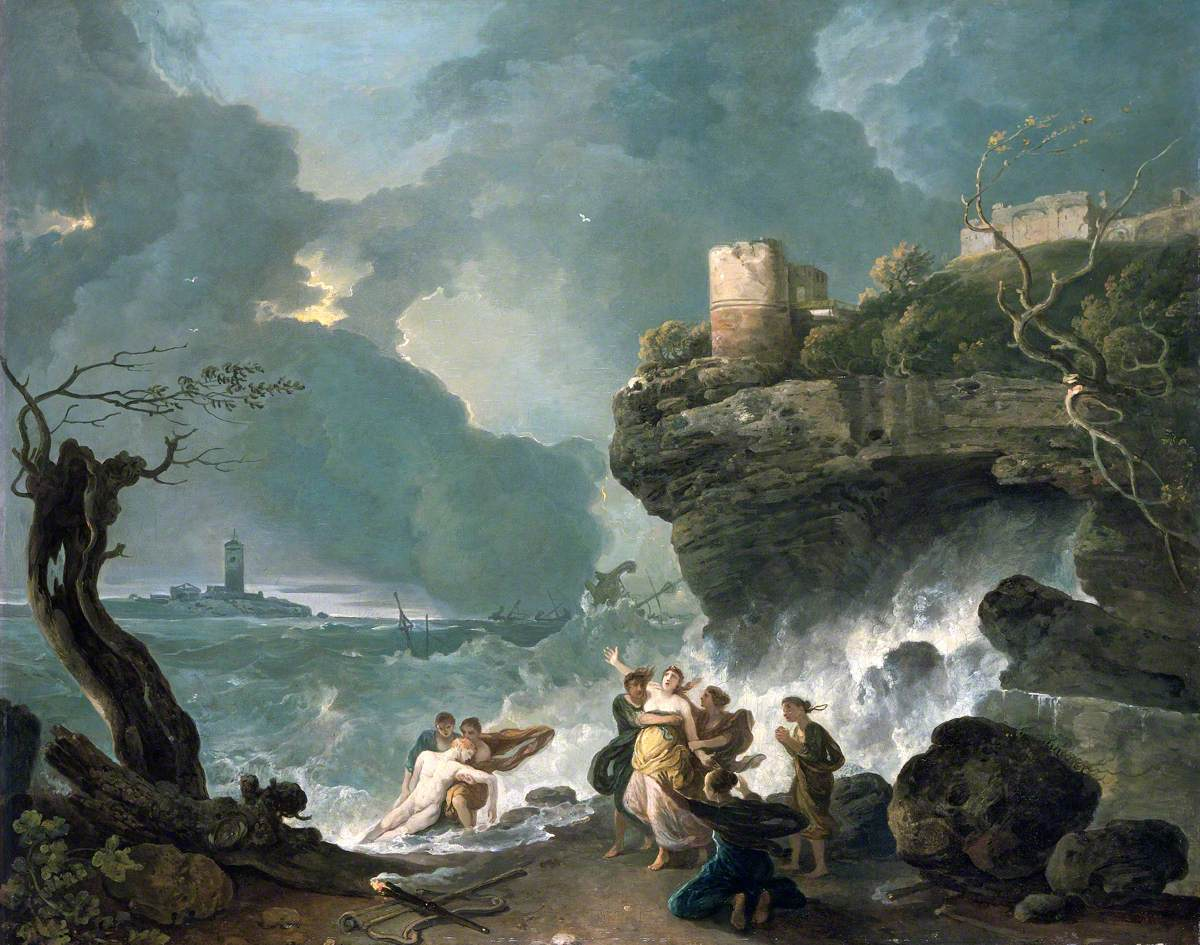
Ceyx and Alcyone by Richard Wilson

== Bibliography ==
- Barratt, Carrie Rebora . John Singleton Copley in America. John Singleton Copley in America. Metropolitan Museum of Art, 1995.
- Hargreaves, Matthew. Candidates for Fame: The Society of Artists of Great Britain, 1760-1791. Paul Mellon Centre for Studies in British Art, 2005.
- McIntyre, Ian. Joshua Reynolds: The Life and Times of the First President of the Royal Academy. Allen Lane, 2003.
- McNairn, Alan. Behold the Hero: General Wolfe and the Arts in the Eighteenth Century. McGill-Queen's Press, 1997
- Prown, Jules David. Art as Evidence: Writings on Art and Material Culture. Yale University Press, 2001.
- Ward, David C. Charles Willson Peale: Art and Selfhood in the Early Republic. University of California Press, 2004.
