= The Captured Spanish Fleet at Havana =

Painting by Dominic Serres

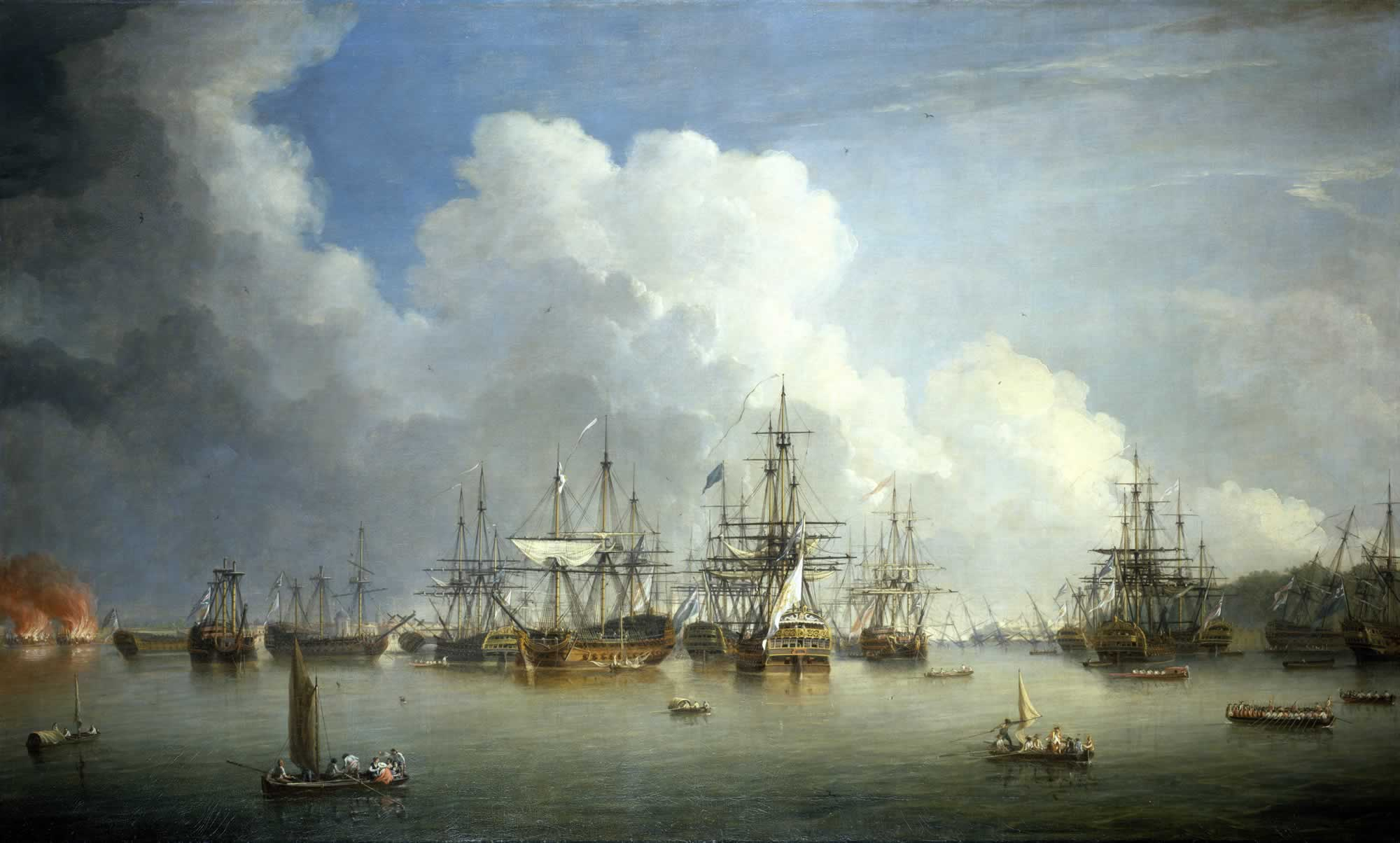
- Artist: Dominic Serres
- Year: 1768
- Type: Oil on canvas, history painting
- Dimensions: 108 cm × 180.4 cm (43 in × 71.0 in)
- Location: National Maritime Museum; London

The Captured Spanish Fleet at Havana is an oil on canvas maritime history painting by the French-British artist Dominic Serres, from 1768.

== History and description ==
It depicts a scene following the British Siege of Havana in 1762, part of the Seven Years' War. Serres produced a number of paintings of maritime military scenes during his career. The painting was one of a series commissioned by the Earl of Albemarle and his brothers William Keppel and Augustus Keppel, who were prominent in the campaign.

This painting is a panorama seen from the southern end of Havana Harbour depicting captured warships of the Spanish Navy. The fortress of El Morro, stormed by British troops during the taking of the city, is visible in the distance on the right while on the left ships under construction on stocks are being burned. A tropical storm is rising. It was likely to be the work he exhibited at the Society of Artists of Great Britain's Exhibition of 1768 at Spring Gardens. Today the painting is in the collection of the National Maritime Museum in Greenwich.

== Bibliography ==
- Keppel, Sonia. Three Brothers at Havana, 1762. Michael Russell, 1981.
- Russett, Alan. Dominic Serres, R.A., 1719-1793: War Artist to the Navy. Antique Collectors' Club, 2001.
- Schneider, Elena A. The Occupation of Havana: War, Trade, and Slavery in the Atlantic World. UNC Press Books, 2018.
- Syrett, David. The Siege and Capture of Havana, 1762. Navy Records Society, 1970.
