= The Piazza at Havana =

Painting by Dominic Serres

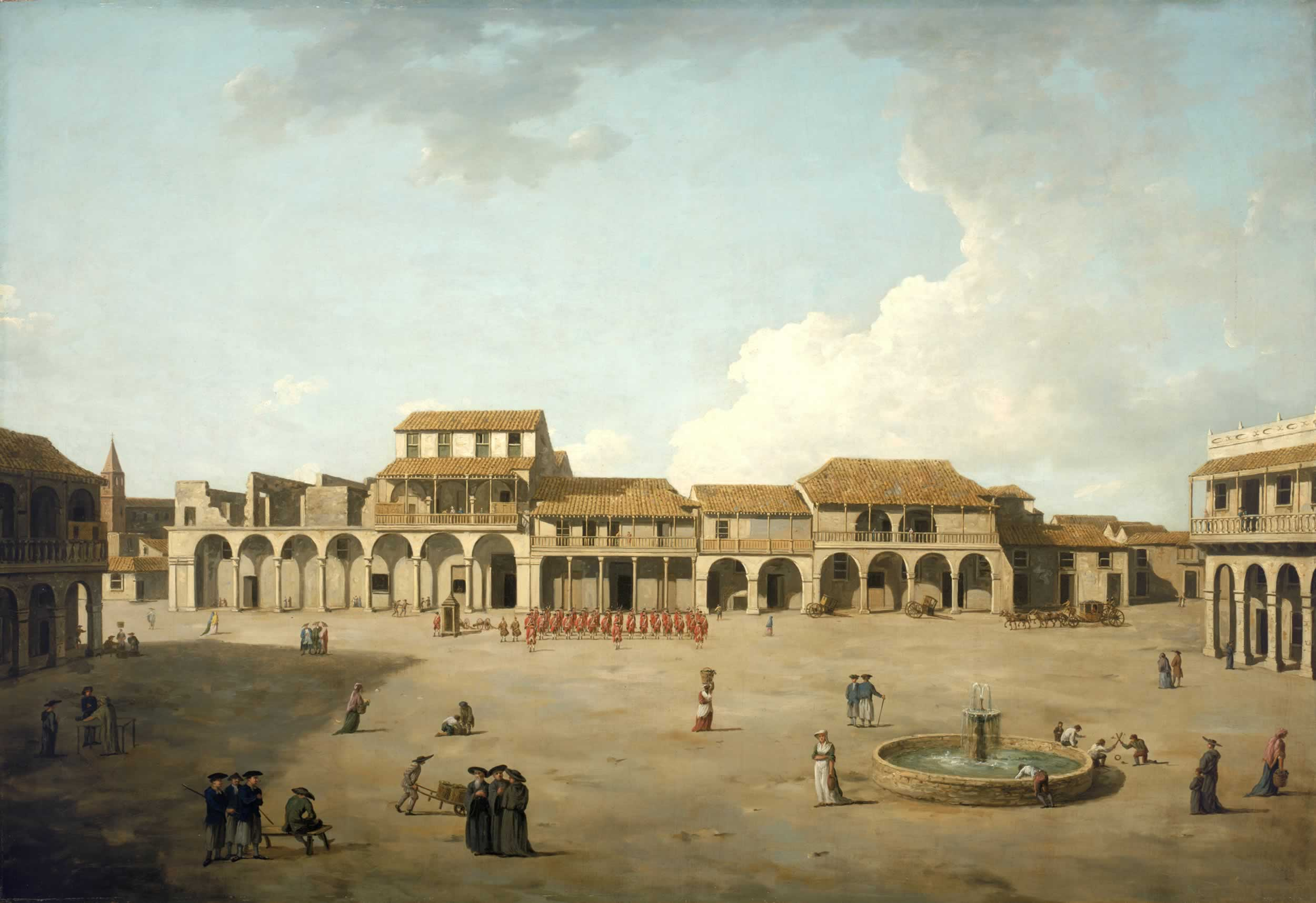
- Artist: Dominic Serres
- Year: c. 1762–1770
- Type: Oil on canvas
- Dimensions: 83.5 cm × 122.3 cm (32.9 in × 48.1 in)
- Location: National Maritime Museum, London

The Piazza at Havana is a landscape painting by the French-born British artist Dominic Serres. It depicts the scene during the British occupation of Havana, Cuba following Britain's capture of the city from Spain during the Seven Years' War. British troops in redcoats are shown parading in the Plaza Vieja while British sailors are in the foreground. Serres painted a series of works focusing on the taking of Havana for the Keppel family, three of whom led the British campaign. The title uses the Italian loan word piazza, common in English during the era, rather than the Spanish plaza.

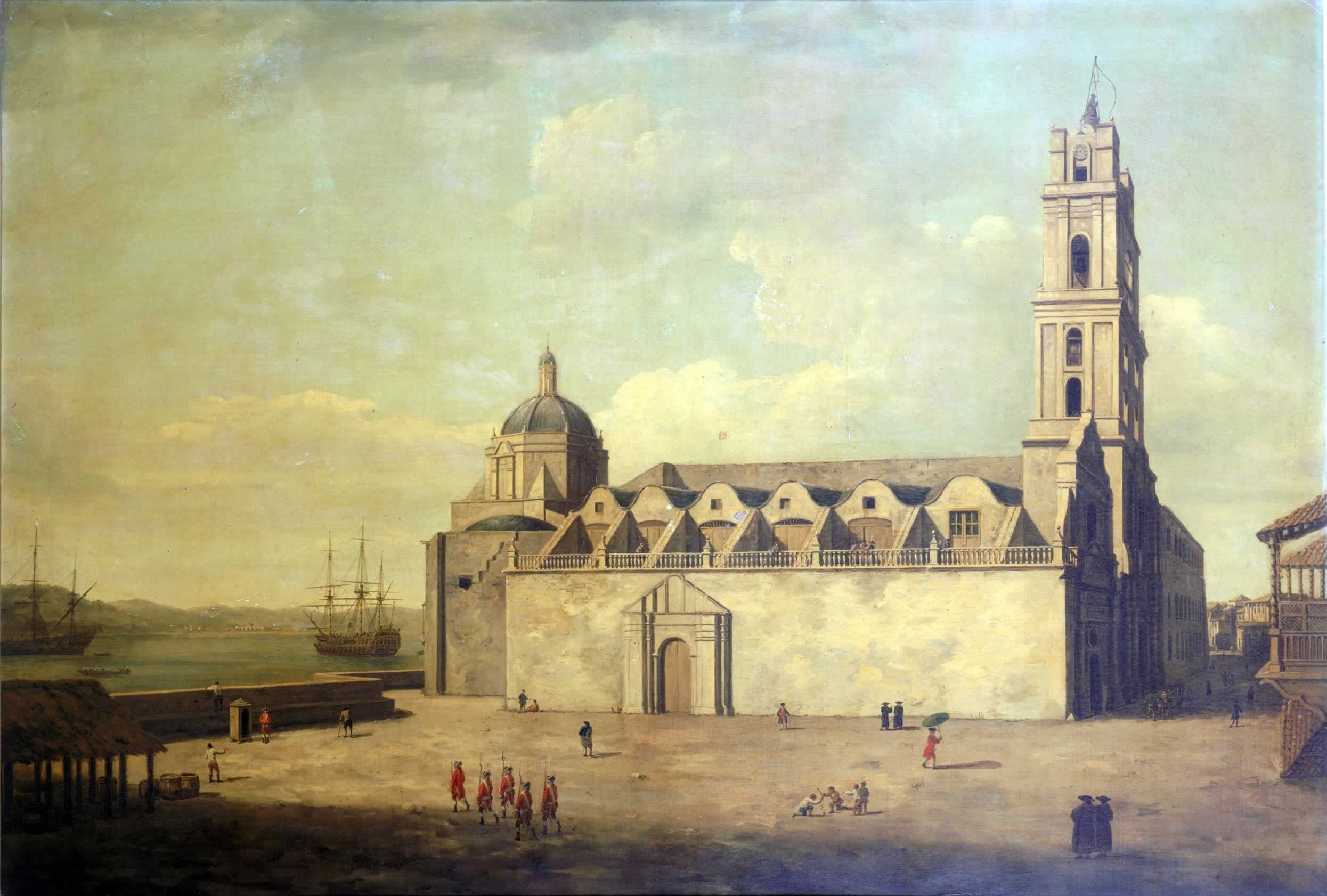
The Cathedral at Havana, a companion piece.

It is part of the collection of the National Maritime Museum at Greenwich, London. It was one of a pair with The Cathedral at Havana a depiction of Havana Cathedral, both showing the city after it had fallen into British hands.

== Bibliography ==
- Mancini, J.M. Art and War in the Pacific World: Making, Breaking, and Taking from Anson's Voyage to the Philippine-American War. University of California Press, 2018.
- Morgan, Philip D. McNeill, John Robert, Mulcahy, Matthew & Schwartz Stuart B. Sea and Land: An Environmental History of the Caribbean. Oxford University Press, 2022.
- Russett, Alan. Dominic Serres, R.A., 1719-1793: War Artist to the Navy. Antique Collectors' Club, 2001.
- Schneider, Elena A. The Occupation of Havana: War, Trade, and Slavery in the Atlantic World. UNC Press Books, 29 Oct 2018.
