= Dominic Serres =

French-born British painter (1722–1793)

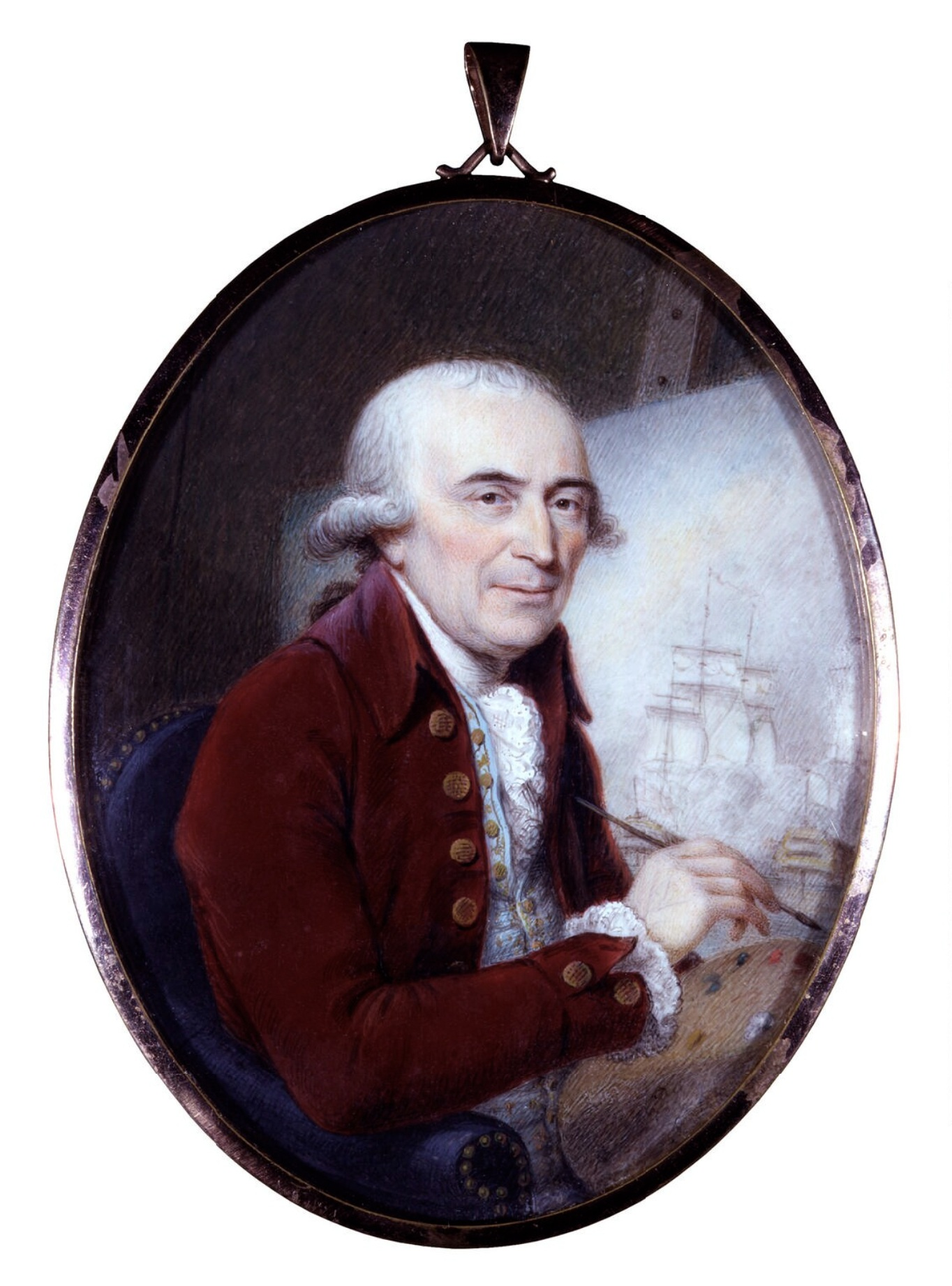
- Portrait by Philip Jean, 1788
- Born: Dominique Serres c. 1722; Auch, Gascony, Kingdom of France
- Died: 4 November 1783 (aged 70–71); London, England
- Known for: Painting
- Movement: Marine art

Dominic Serres RA (born Dominique Serres; c. 1722 – 4 November 1793) was a French-born British painter who specialised in marine art. He co-founded the Royal Academy (RA) in 1768, and served as the RA's librarian from 1792 until his death.

== Life and works ==
Dominique Serres was born in Auch, Gascony, in southwestern France, between 1719 and 1723. Some sources say he died at the age of 74, but this is not confirmed. He initially studied to become a priest at the Benedictine seminary in Douai, but then left and moved to Spain. He is said to have become a merchant sailor in the Mediterranean and to have lived in Italy. He also worked as a sailor in South America, became a merchant captain in Cuba, and lived for several years as a merchant in Havana. In 1748, he was captured by the British in the Caribbean, and was taken prisoner to England, in 1752. During his imprisonment in the Marshalsea prison he took up painting, and after his release he lived for a time in Northamptonshire, where he made his living by painting marine scenes. He copied the works of Willem van de Velde the Elder, a Dutch marine painter, very popular at the time in England. He then moved to London, where he is believed to have learned his techniques from the marine painter Charles Brooking (c. 1723–1759). If Serres did not settle in London until 1758, however, he could not have studied for long under Brooking, since he was buried on 25 March 1759.

During the Seven Years' War (1756-1763), the exploits of the British fleet in battles such as the Siege of Havana, in 1762, where the British inflicted significant damage on the Spanish Navy, and the Battle of Chandannagar, led to an increase of popularity of naval paintings depicting these battles, and Serres' work on that matter met British popular tastes. Working for a publisher documenting the events of the Seven Years' War, he painted a series of depictions, including the capture of Havana. He also painted events in the American Revolutionary War, such as the disastrous Penobscot Expedition launched by the Americans in 1779.

He participated at the exhibitions held by the Society of Artists of Great Britain, founded in the early 1760s, and became a member in 1765. The Royal Academy of Arts was founded in 1768, and he was elected as a founding member.

In 1780, he was appointed Marine Painter to King George III. He was appointed librarian at the Royal Academy, but died shortly after, in London, in 1793. Serres was buried at St. Marylebone Old Church.

== Family ==
Serres married Mary Colldycutt, aged 18 years old, on 16 July 1749. They were married in what was known as a 'Fleet wedding', a less expensive and less formal form of marriage that was possible without affiliation to a particular parish and was common in the area around Fleet Prison at the time. The couple had four daughters, Catherine, Augusta Charlotte, Johanna and Sarah, and two sons, the elder of whom, John Thomas Serres, also became a prolific marine painter. Dominique Michael, the younger, was also a painter but specialised in depicting landscapes.

== Gallery ==
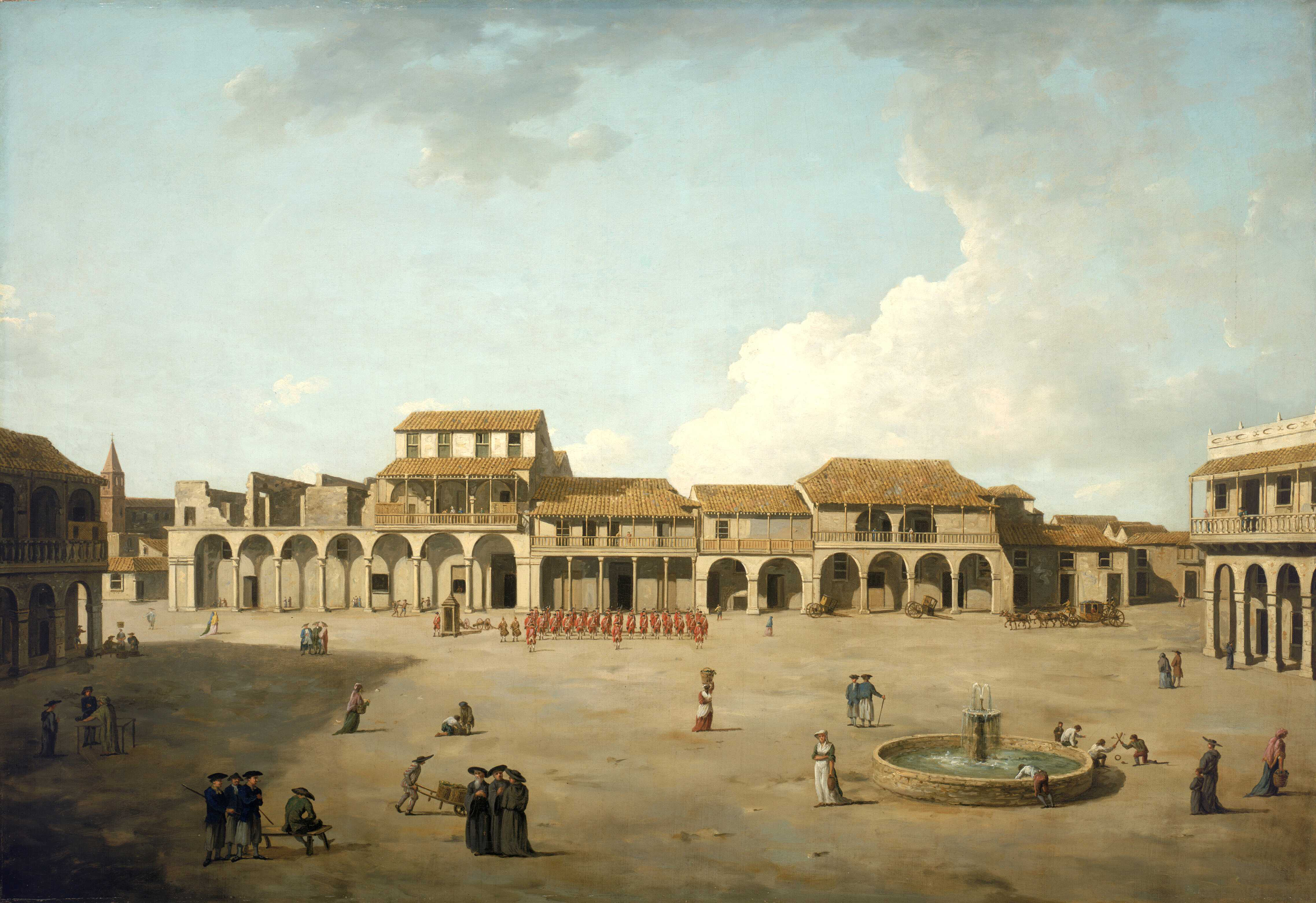
The Piazza at Havana (1762)

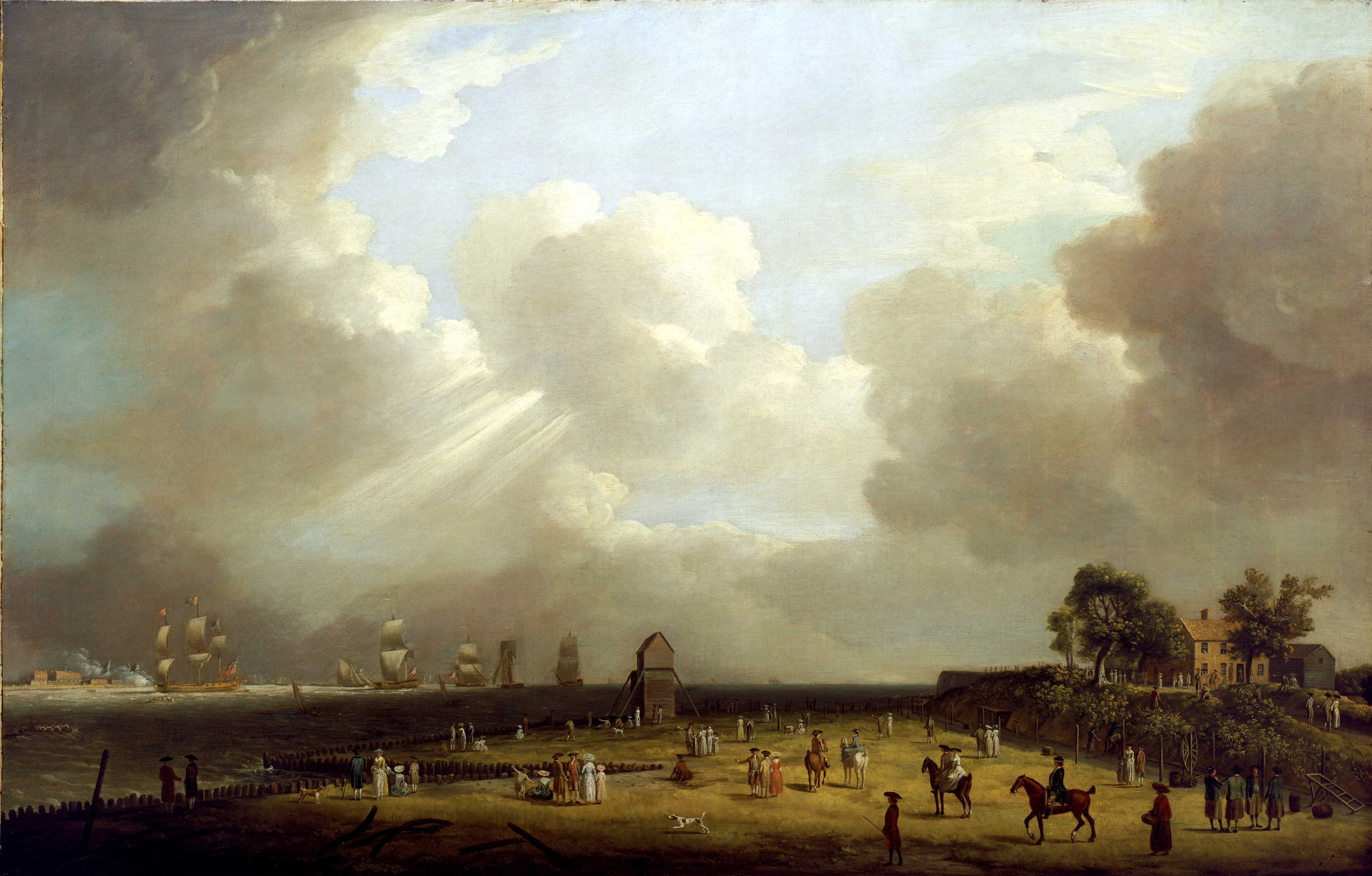
Princess Charlotte Arriving at Harwich (1763)

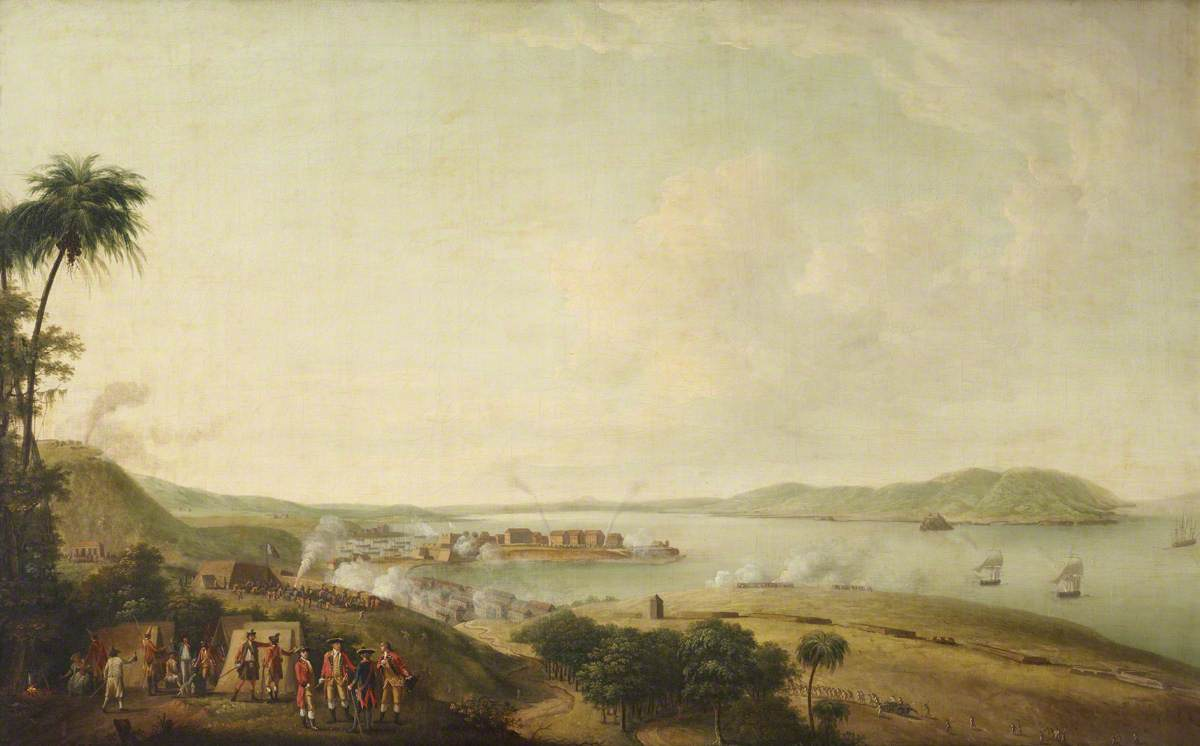
British Attack on the Citadel of Martinique (1767)

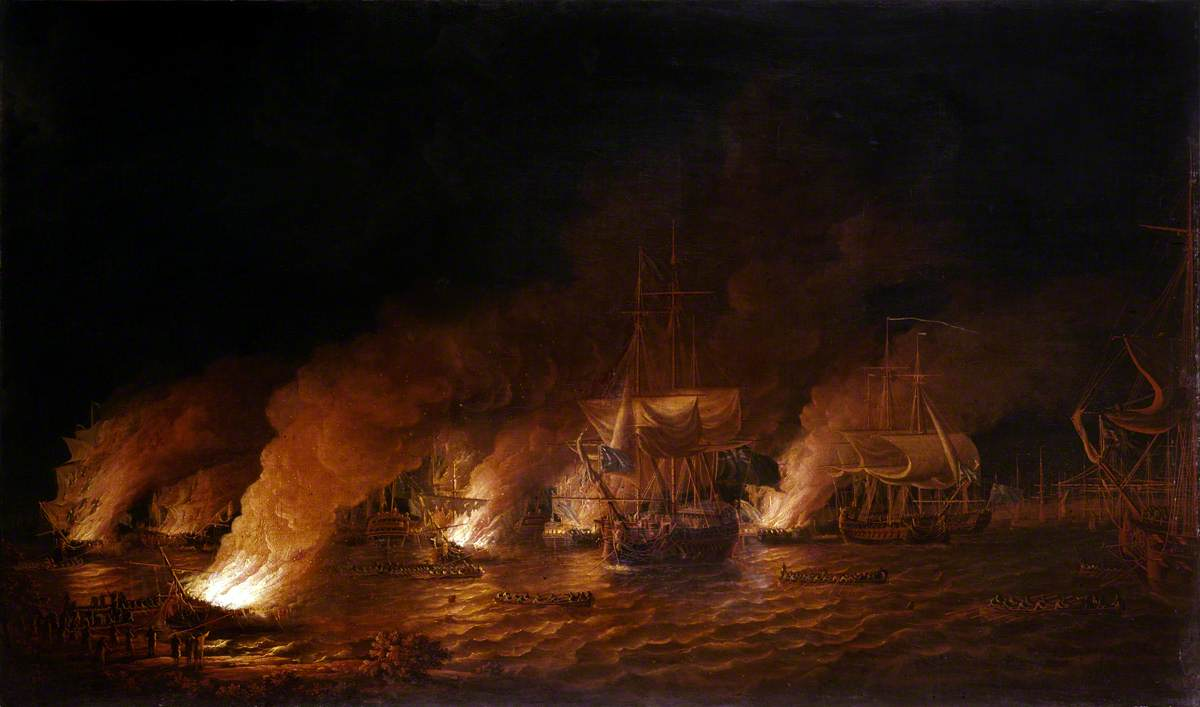
French Fire-Ships Attacking the English Fleet off Quebec, 1767

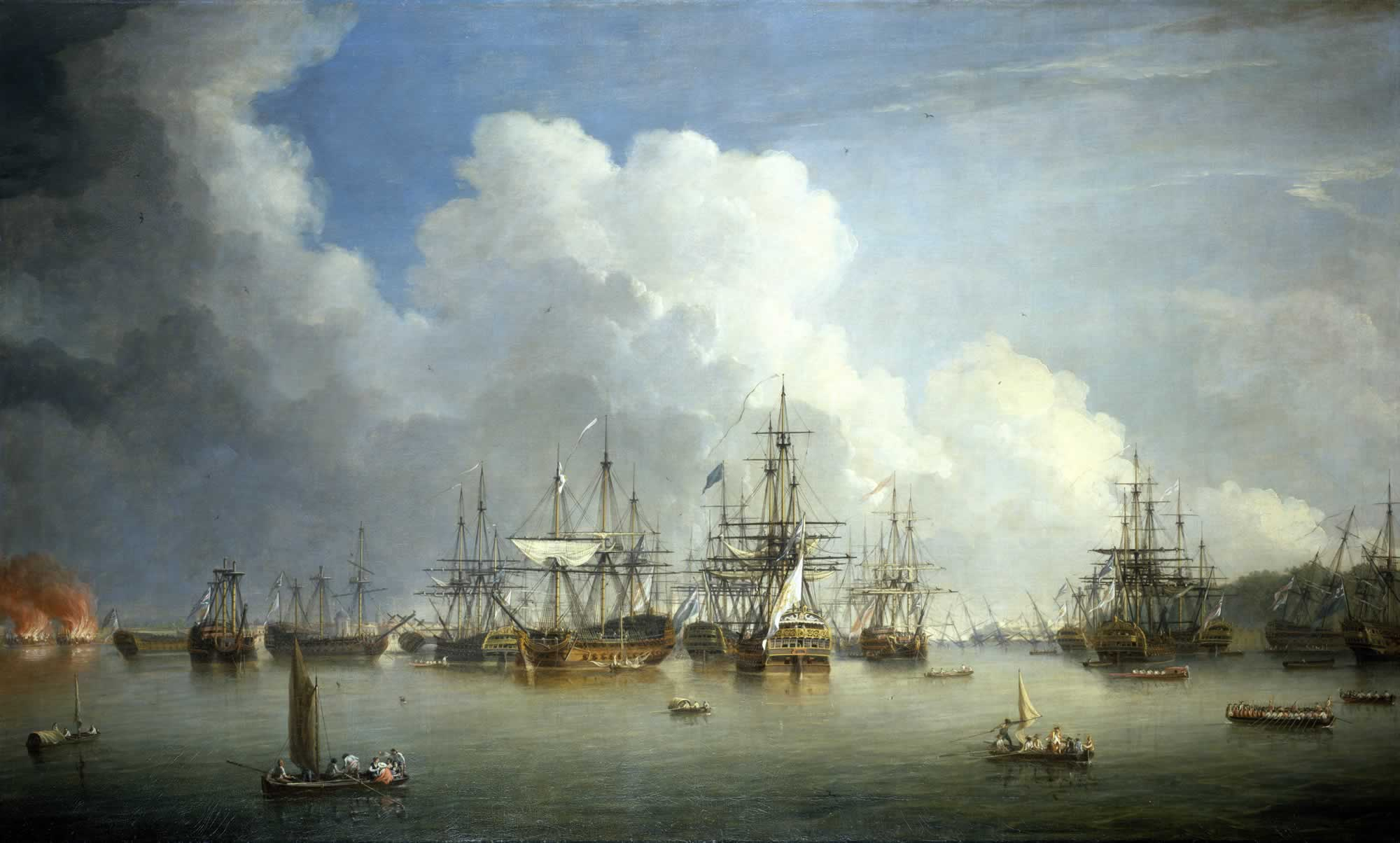
The Captured Spanish Fleet at Havana, 1768

The Storming of Morro Castle, 1770

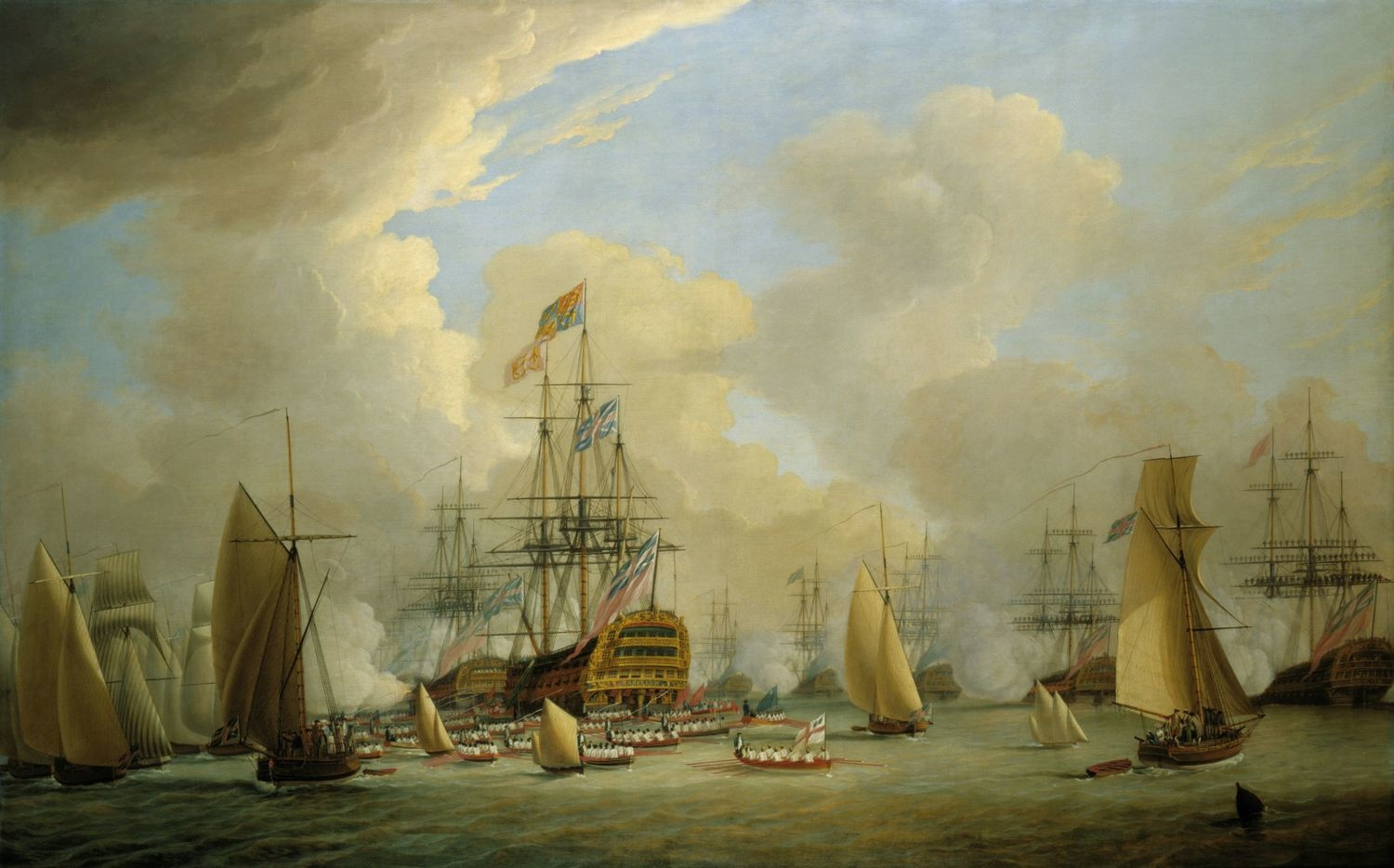
The Royal Visit to the Fleet (1774)

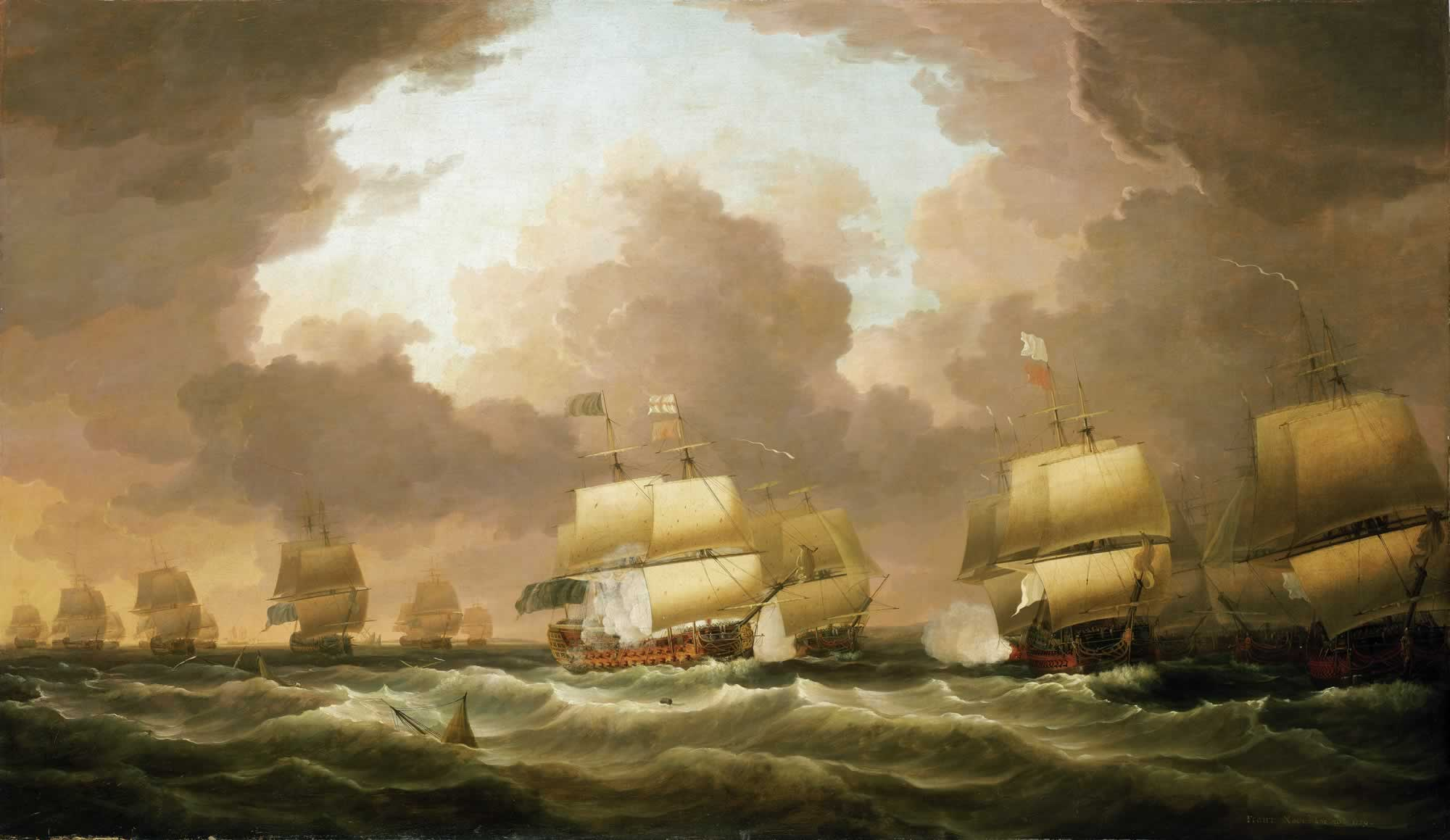
The Battle of Quiberon Bay, (1779)

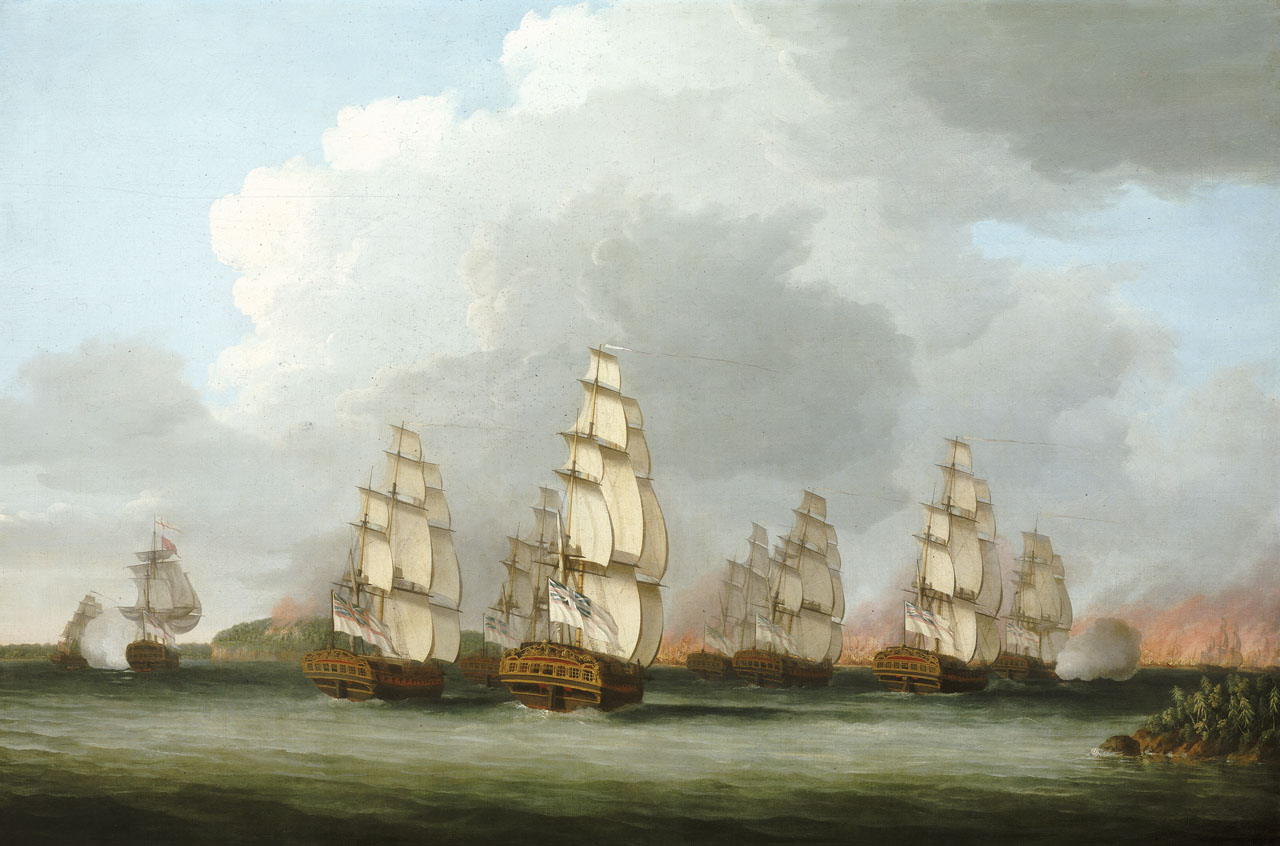
Destruction of the American Fleet at Penobscot Bay (1779)

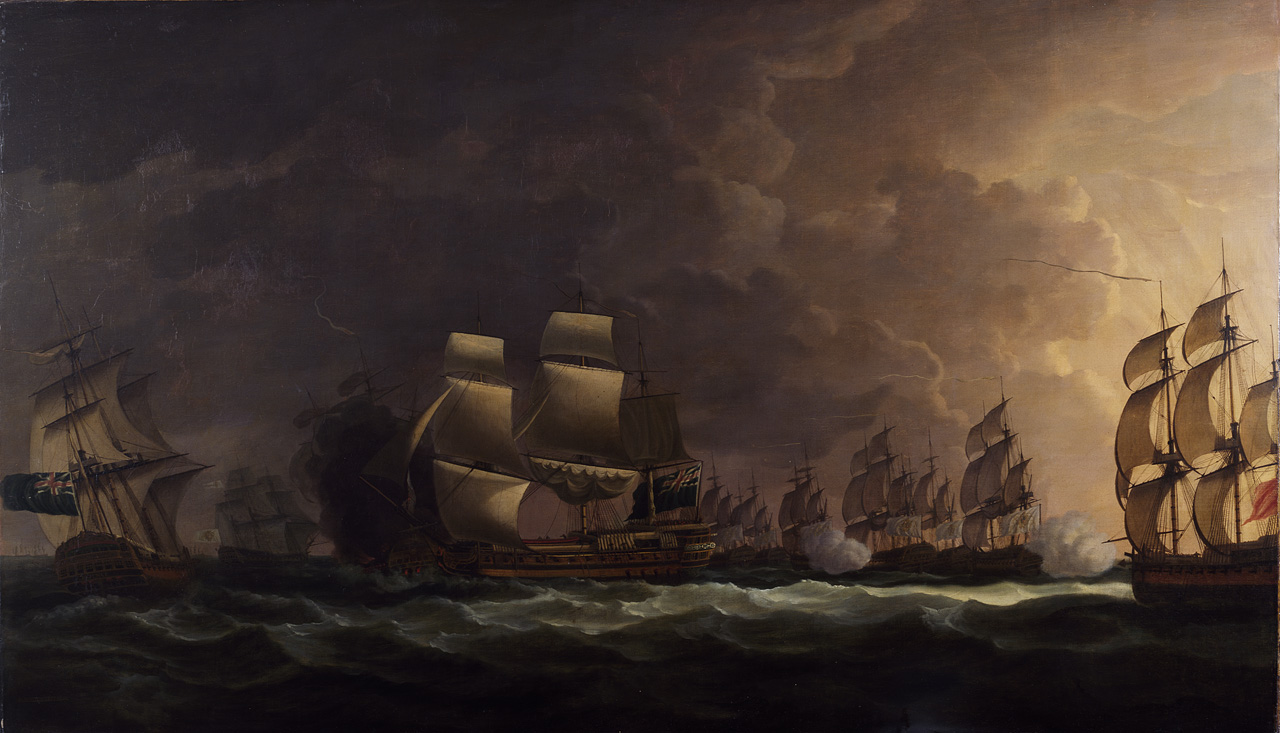
The Moonlight Battle (1781)

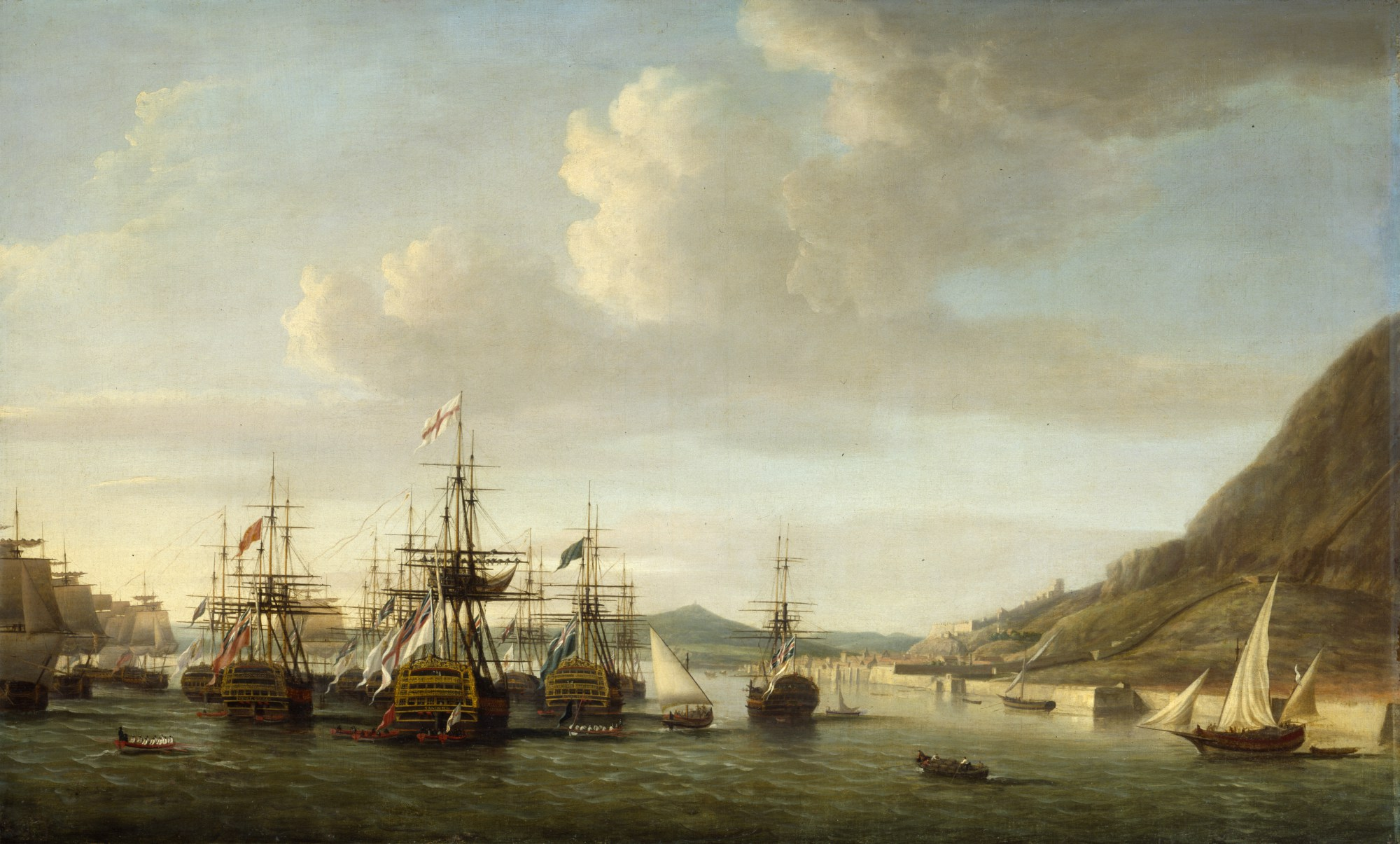
Gibraltar Relieved By Sir George Rodney, (c.1782)

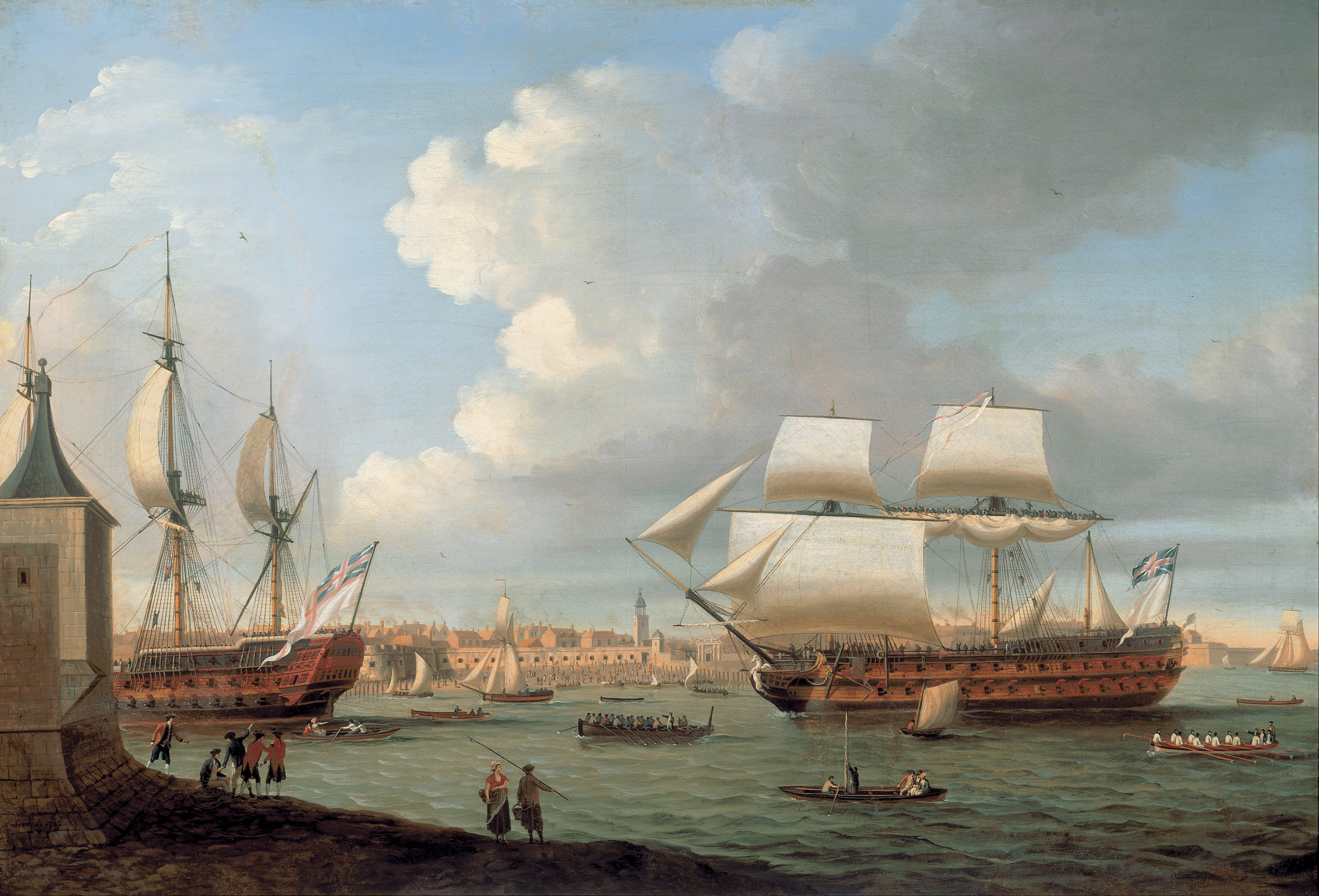
Foudroyant and Pégase entering Portsmouth Harbour (1782)

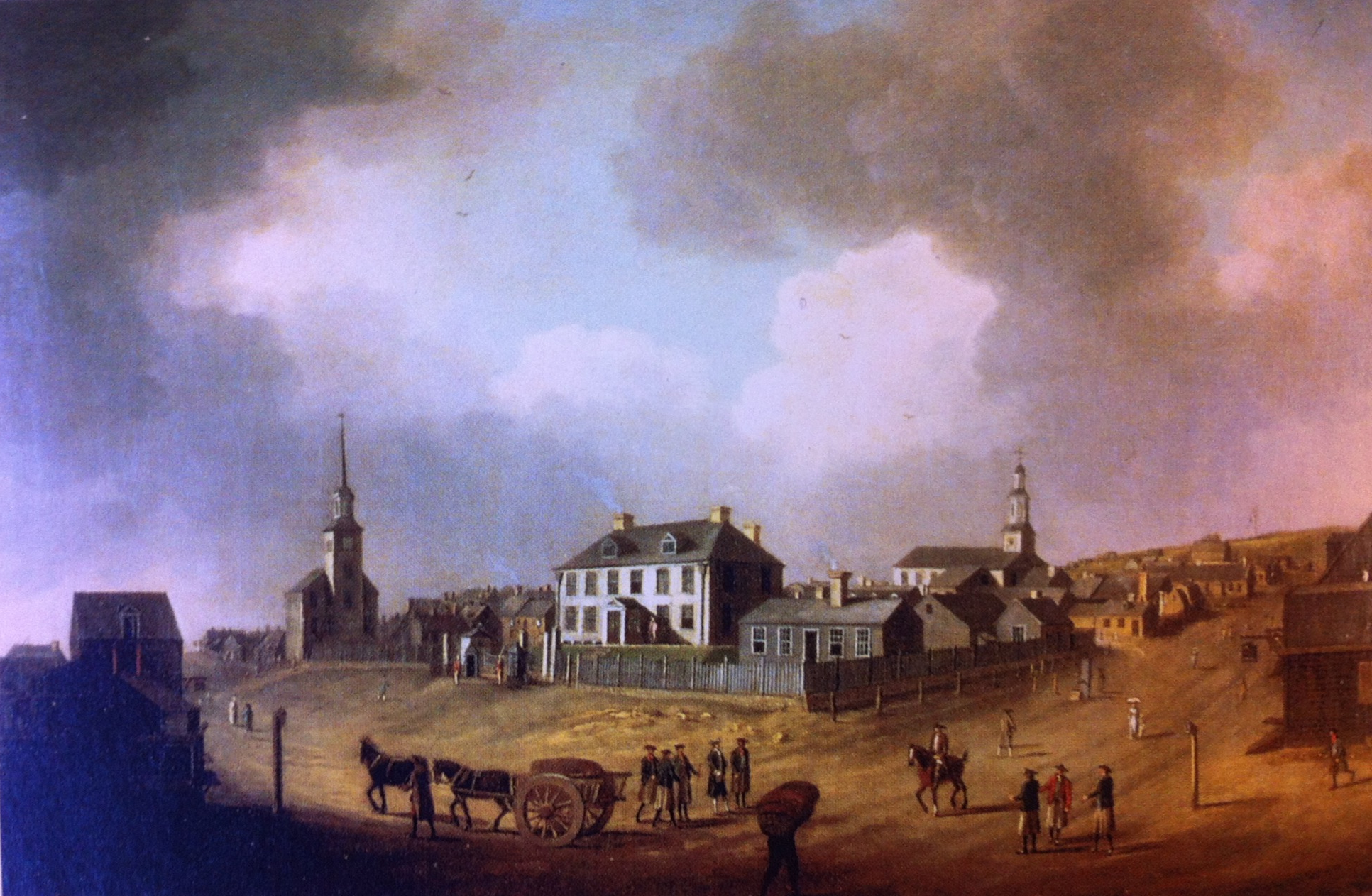
Halifax, Nova Scotia c. 1762

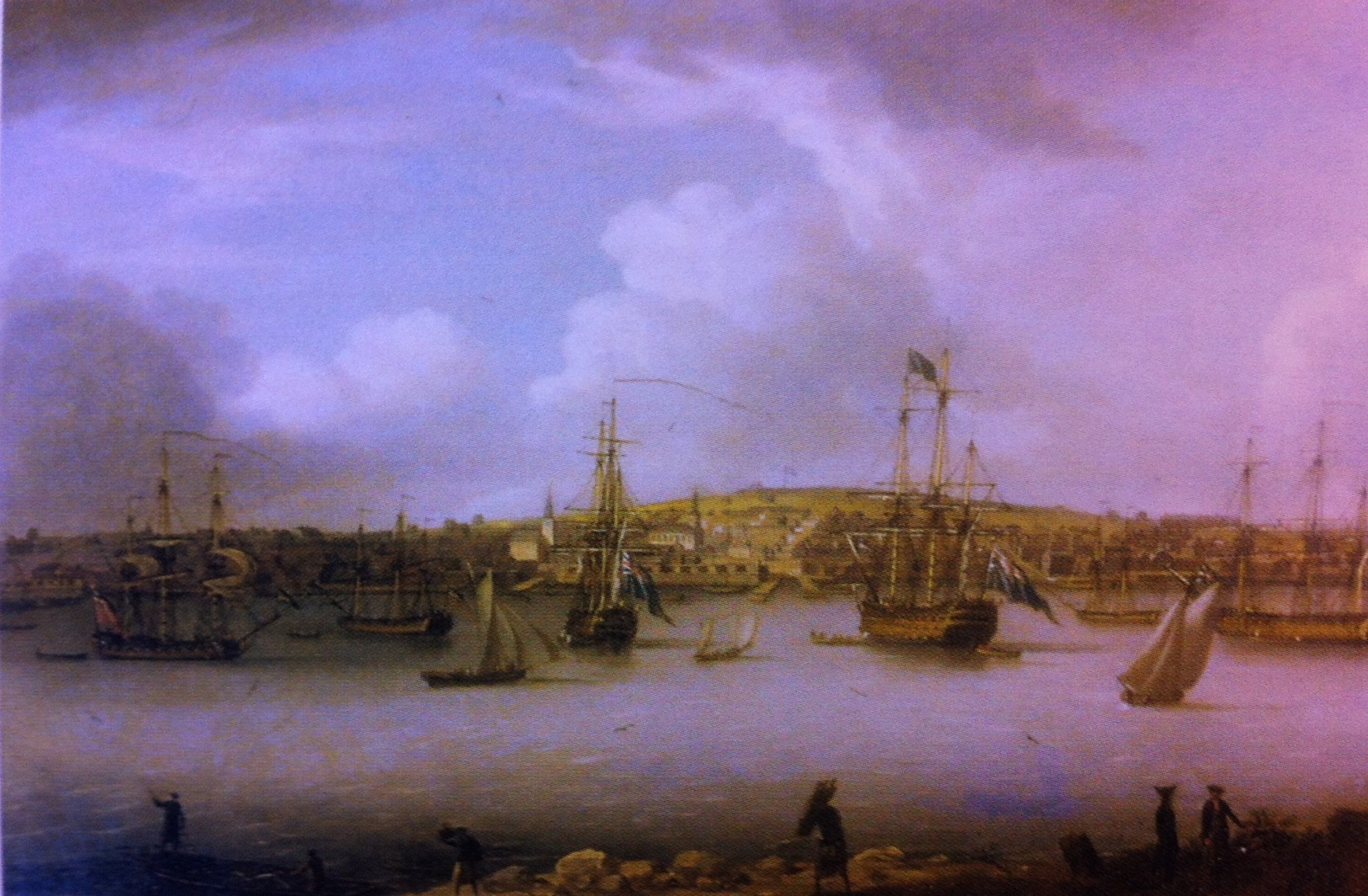
Halifax, Nova Scotia c. 1762

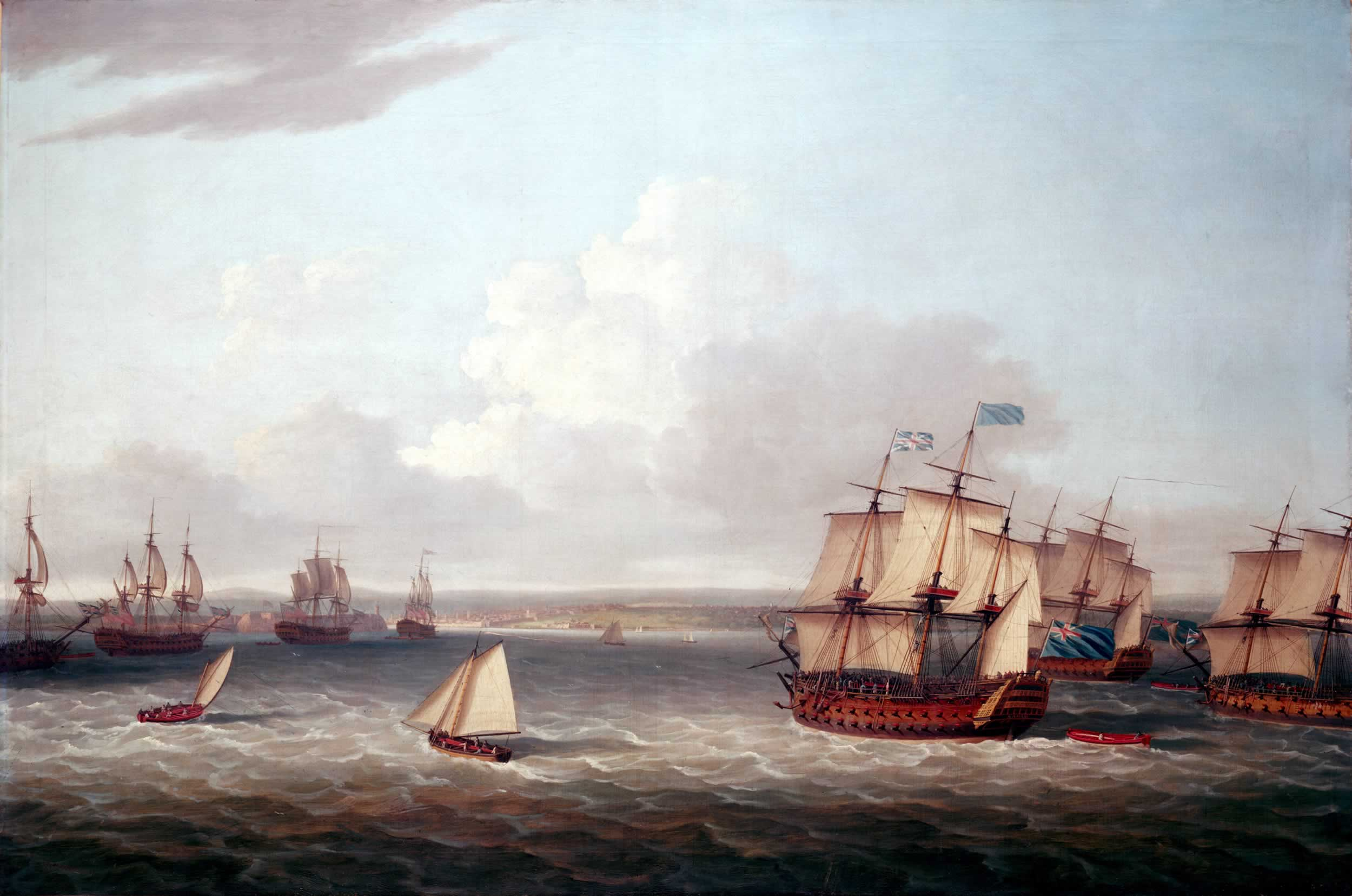
Battle of Havana (1762)

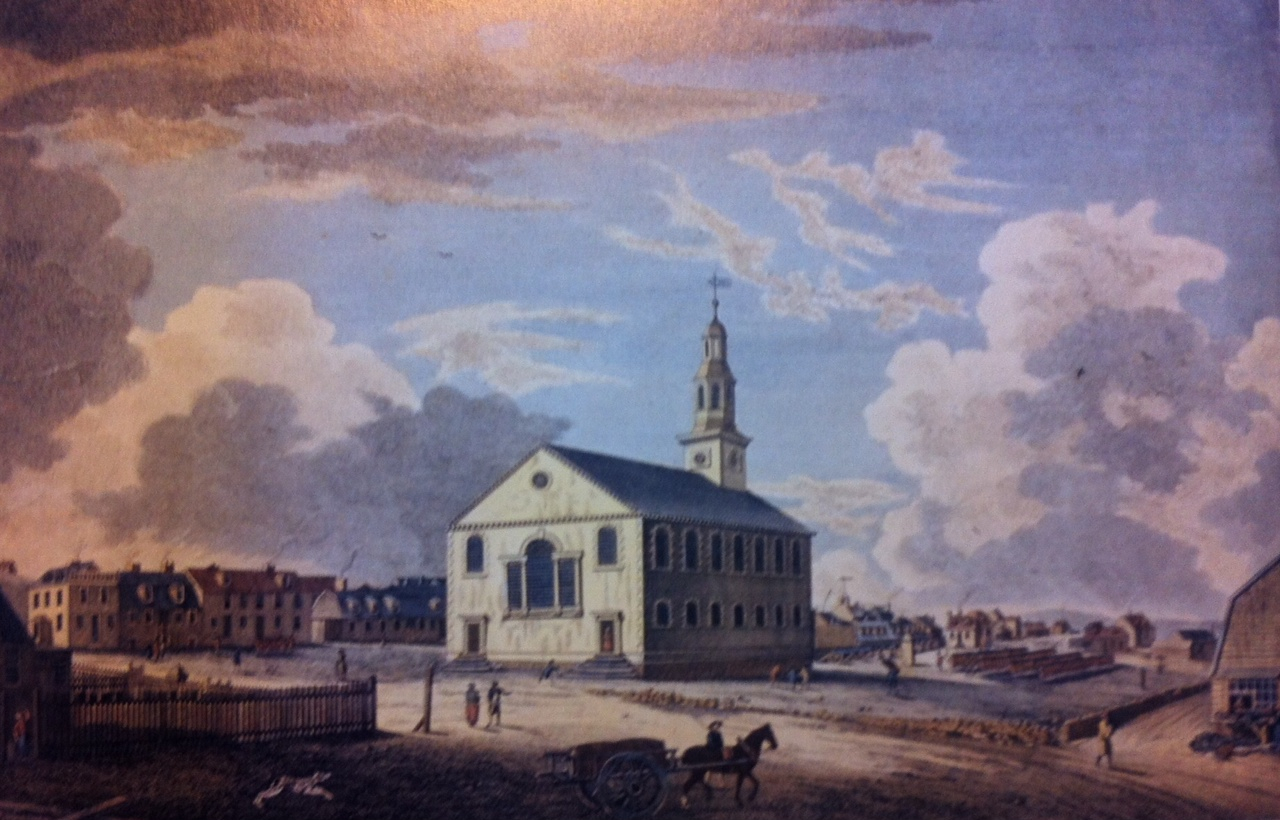
Halifax, Nova Scotia c. 1777

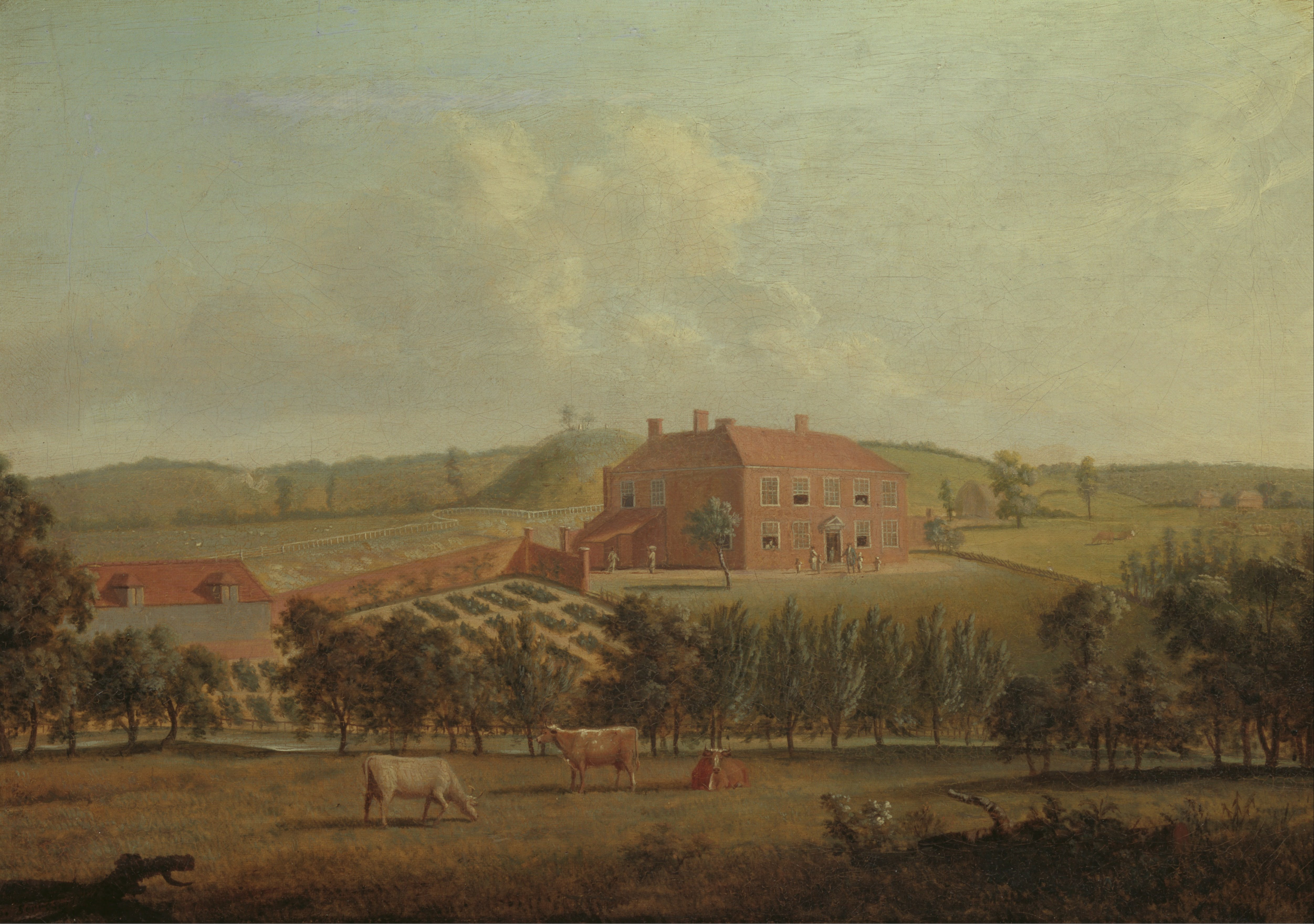
Saint Vincents, near West Malling, Kent

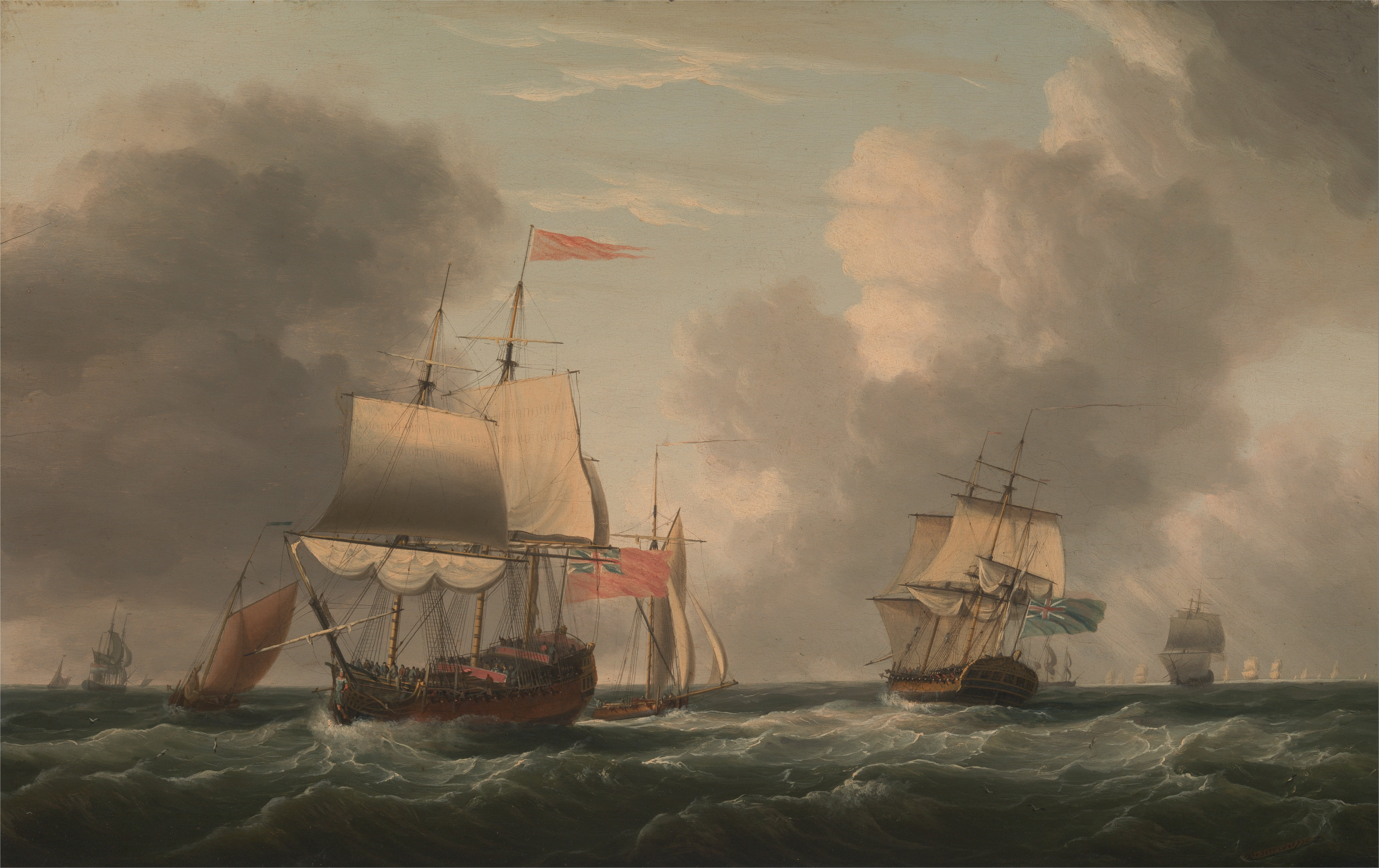
The Lying Hove

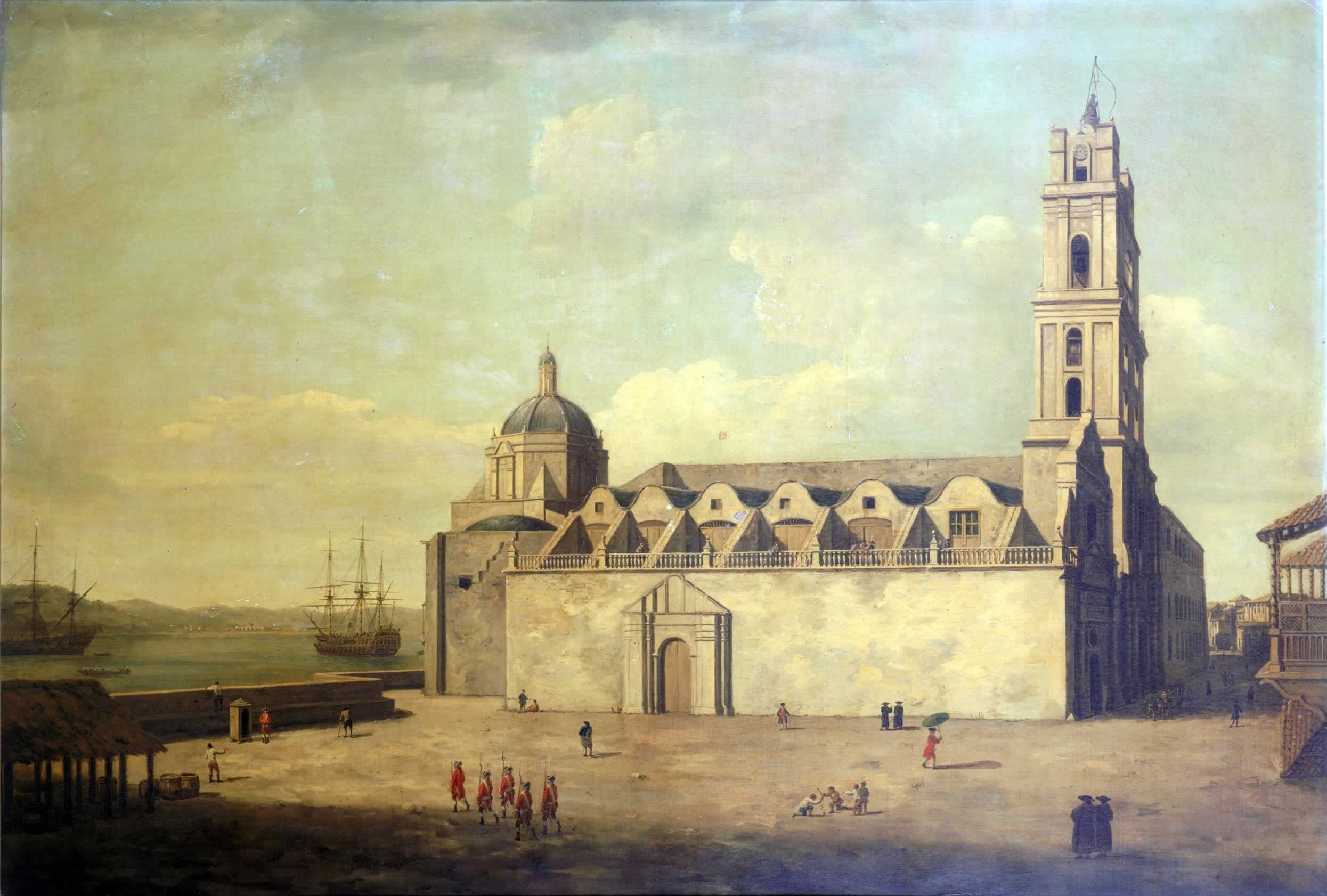
Painting of the Basilica of San Francisco de Asís, Havana in 1770 by Dominic Serres.
