= Luis Vicente de Velasco =

Spanish Navy officer (1711–1762)

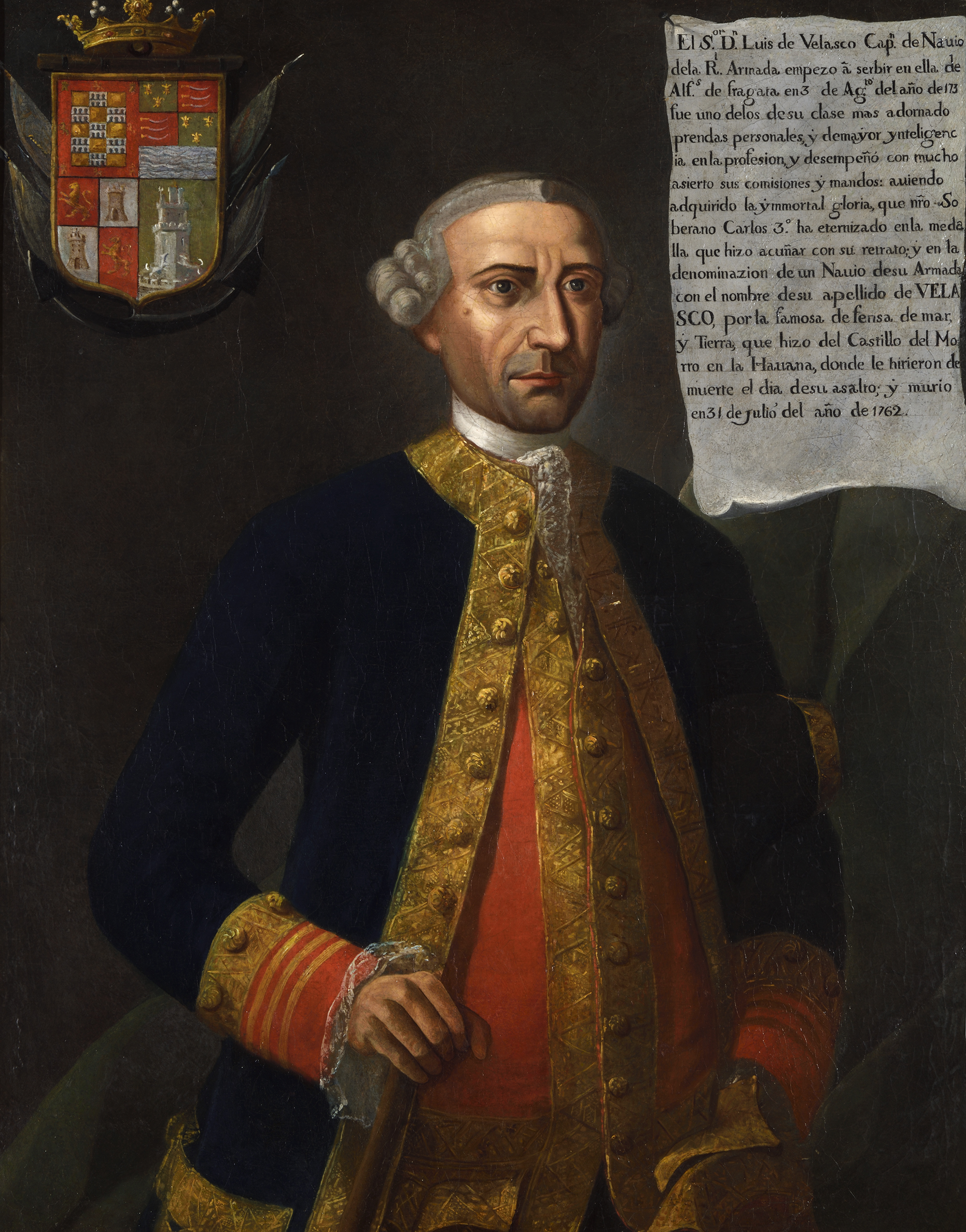
- Portrait by José Nicolás de la Escalera, c. 1763
- Born: 9 February 1711; Noja, Cantabria
- Died: 31 July 1762 (aged 51); Havana, Cuba
- Relatives: Iñigo José de Velasco (brother)
- Military career
- Allegiance: Spain
- Branch: Spanish Navy
- Service years: 1732–1762
- Rank: Ship-of-the-line captain
- Commands: Reina
- Conflicts: Spanish conquest of Oran (1732); Anglo-Spanish War; Siege of Havana

Ship-of-the-line Captain Luis Vicente de Velasco e Isla (9 February 1711 – 31 July 1762) was a Spanish Navy officer who served in the Anglo-Spanish War. He was killed in action during the British siege of Havana in 1762.

== Life ==
Luis Vicente de Velasco was born in Noja, Cantabria. He enlisted in the Spanish navy and became a sailor at the age of 15 and saw his first action in an engagement at against a Barbary corsair. He participated in the Conquest of Oran in 1732.

== Battle of Havana and death ==
During the Seven Years' War the British sent an expedition against Cuba in 1762 with a fleet of 23 ships of the line, 11 frigates, 4 sloops, 3 bomb ketches, 1 cutter alongside 160 troop transports, consisting of 31,000 men in total. The Spanish forces opposing them had 11,670 men, 10 ships of the line, 2 frigates, 2 sloops and hundreds of cannons mounted on Havana's extensive fortifications. 10,000 soldiers disembarked under the command of George Keppel, 3rd Earl of Albemarle and captured the heights, which the governor of Cuba, Juan de Prado had left undefended.

Velasco defended the vital Morro Castle with 64 cannons and a garrison of 700 men. On 1 July the British launched a combined land and naval attack on the Morro. The fleet detached four ships of the line for this purpose: HMS Stirling Castle, HMS Dragon, HMS Marlborough and HMS Cambridge. The naval and land artilleries simultaneously opened fire on the Morro. However, the naval bombardment proved to be ineffective as the elevation of the fort proved too high for the cannons of the ships to effectively target the batteries, and the attack was called off.

The fortress held out for another two months despite daily shelling, thanks to the effective leadership of Velasco. The resistance came to an end when Velasco died after being hit by a bullet in the chest. The Earl of Albemarle allowed the transfer of the heavily wounded Velasco to Havana, where British surgeons tried to save his life, but in vain; he died on 31 July 1762. The British and Spanish concluded a temporary truce to allow for his burial. Two weeks later, Havana was captured. The capture proved to be a humiliating Spanish defeat, as the entire garrison present were either killed or captured, alongside the fleet in the harbour (which the Spanish had neglected to burn) and one hundred merchantmen.

== Legacy ==
Velasco was honoured by the Spanish for his bravery. King Charles III of Spain had a statue of him erected in Meruelo, ordered a navy ship to be named in his honour, and gave his brother Iñigo José de Velasco the title of Marquess of Velasco.

Four ships of the Spanish Navy have borne the name Velasco in honor of Velasco.
