= Belasco =

Belasco may refer to:

== People ==
- Belasco (cartoonist), African-American gay erotic artist
- Belasco (surname), people with this surname

== Other ==
- Belasco (Marvel Comics), a supervillain from Marvel Comics
- Belasco Theatre, the current or former name of various theatres
- Emeric Belasco, a character in the novel Hell House
- Belasco (PAT station), a station on the Port Authority of Allegheny County's light rail network, Pittsburgh

== See also ==
- Velasco (disambiguation)
