= Spanish ship Aquilon =

Ship of the line of the Spanish Navy

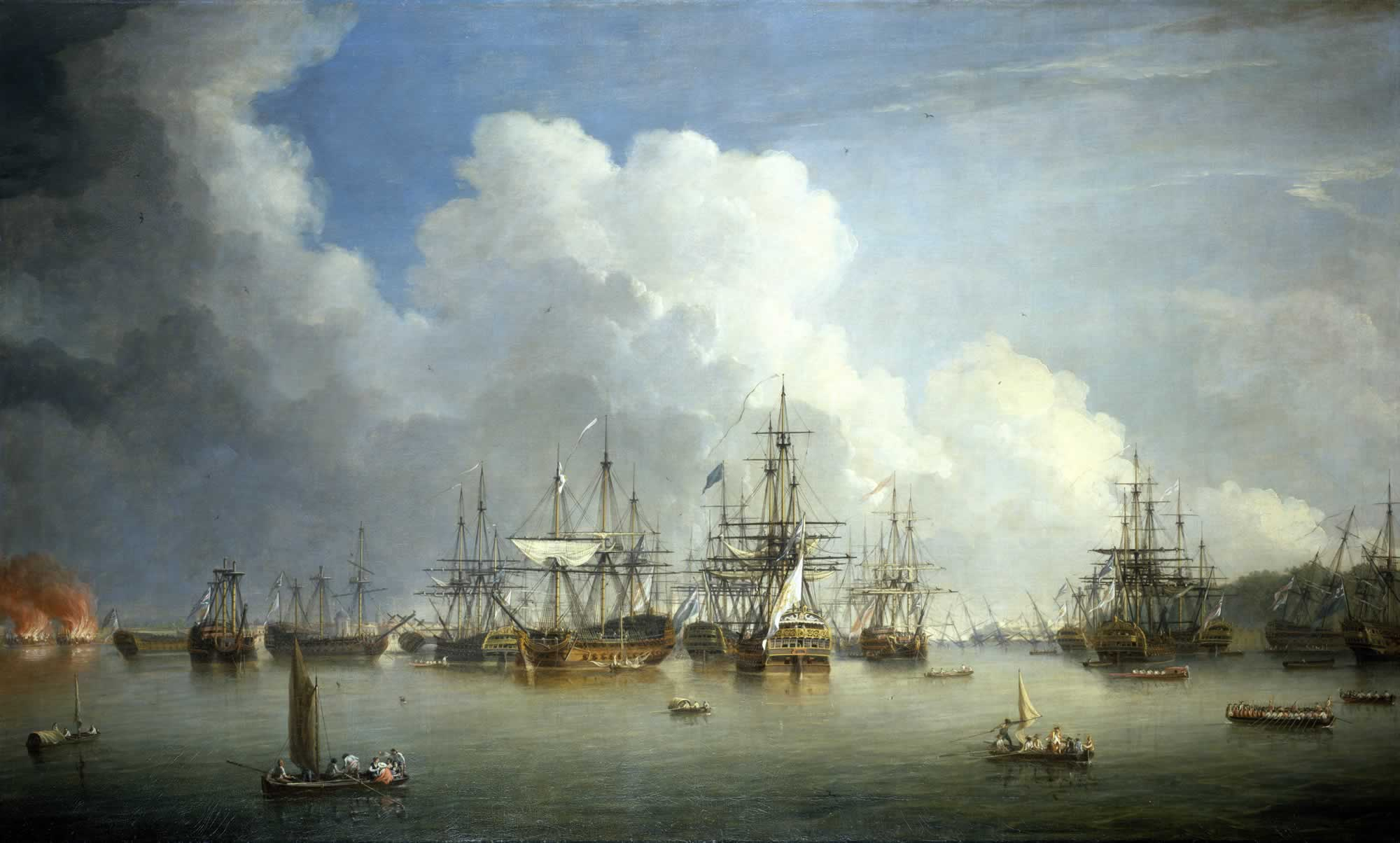
Painting by Dominic Serres depicting captured Spanish warships at Havana; Aquilón is possibly among them.

Aquilón was a 68-gun ship of the line of the Spanish Navy.

== History ==
She and her 11 sister ships were ordered on 15 June 1752 and their keels laid later that year at the Reales Astilleros de Esteiro. She belonged to the series popularly known as the 12 apostles or the Apostolate, all constructed simultaneously in the same shipyard by the British shipwright Rooth between 1753 and 1755 using the English method or by Jorge Juan y Santacilia.

She was launched on 10 March 1754, entering service with 68 guns like the other 11 ships (some of the others later expanded to 74 guns). In mid-1754, under the command of Captain Francisco Lastarría, she sailed from Ferrol to Cadiz until December of that year. In April 1755 she was anchored in ordinary at the Arsenal de la Carraca, where it was found that she leaked and her wood rotted easily as with other ships built using the Gaztañeta method. From August 1755 onwards she underwent several modifications before being stationed at Cartagena to fight Algerian pirates as part of Gutierre de Hevia's squadron between 1759 and 1761.

On 4 March 1761 she and the Soberano sailed from Cartagena, arriving in Cadiz on 24 March, transporting a total of 650 men of the 2nd battalion of the Aragon Infantry Regiment, of which 327 were on board the Aquilón. At Cadiz they were joined by the Tigre, Asia, Vencedor and Conquistador and the six ships sailed under de Hevia's command on 14 April for Havana, arriving on 27 June after dropping off some troops in Puerto Rico and Santiago de Cuba. During their stay in Havana there was an outbreak of black vomiting, lasting until 1761 and causing 1,800 casualties among the troops and crews.

On 6 June 1762 she was surprised in the Bay of Havana by a British squadron of 53 ships of the line and 25,000 soldiers and sailors under admiral George Pocock. Her captain Vicente González-Valor y Bassecourt, marqués de González was killed in the defence of El Morro and replaced by Diego Argote. On 9 June she was ordered to the coves of Regla and Guanabacoa. On 24 June she was hit 78 times by the British. When Havana surrendered, she was captured and later commissioned into the Royal Navy in 1764 as HMS Moro, serving until 1770 when she was broken up.

== Bibliography ==
- Winfield, Rif (2007). British Warships in the Age of Sail 1714–1792: Design, Construction, Careers and Fates. Seaforth Publishing. ISBN 978-1-84415-700-6.
- Winfield, Rif; Tredrea, John M; García-Torralba Pérez, Enrique & Blasco Felip, Manuel (2023). Spanish Warships in the Age of Sail 1700—1860: Design, Construction, Careers and Fates. Seaforth Publishing. ISBN 978-1-5267-9078-1.
