= José Nicolás de la Escalera =

José Nicolás de Escalera
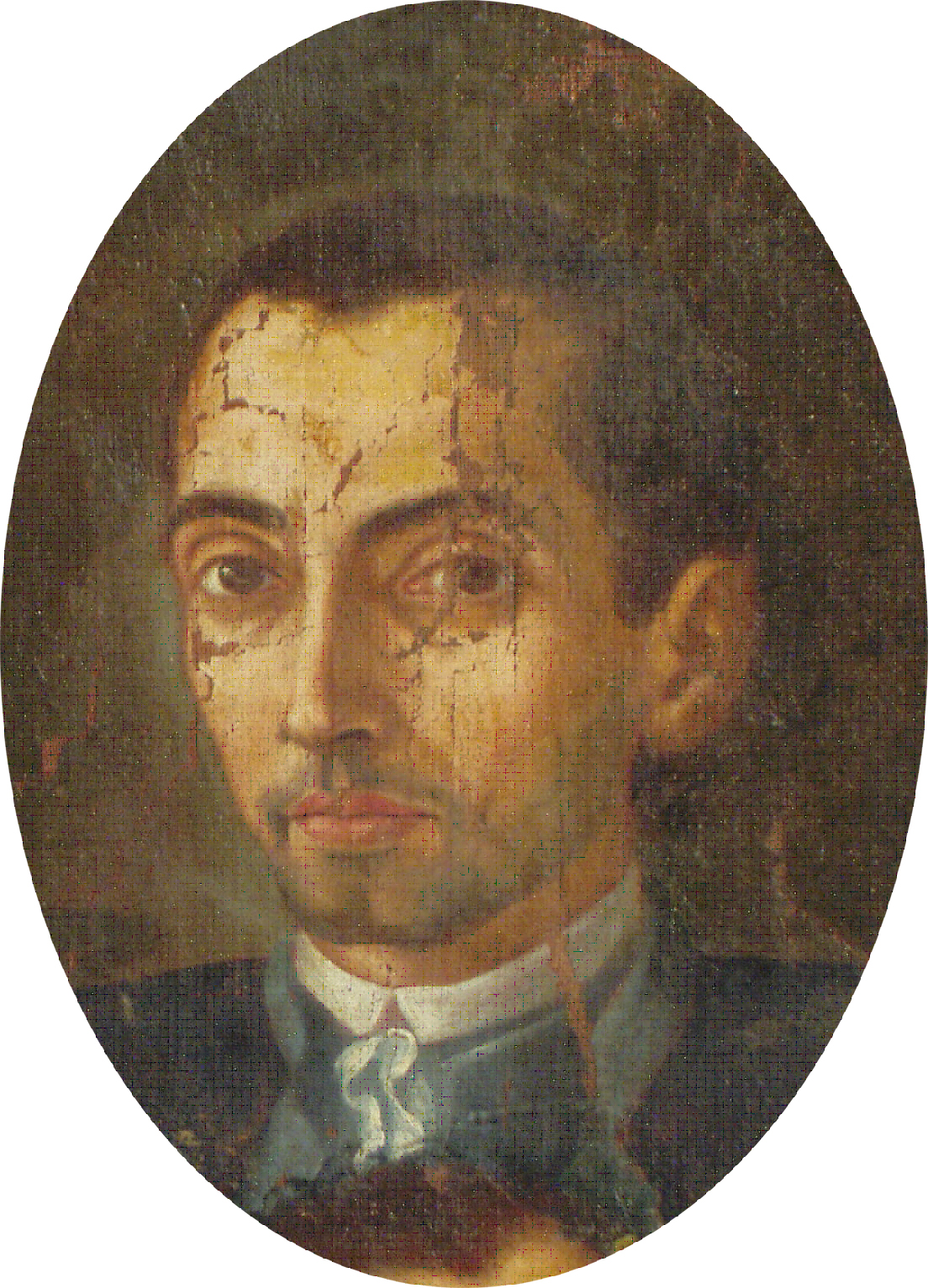
- Self-portrait of de Escalera
- Born: September 8, 1734; Havana, Captaincy General of Cuba, Spanish Empire
- Died: July 3, 1804 (aged 69); Havana, Captaincy General of Cuba, Spanish Empire
- Known for: Religious art, Portrait painting
- Movement: Baroque

José Nicolás de Escalera (8 September 1734 – 3 July 1804) was a Cuban painter who specialised in Catholic art and portrait painting. He is often described as "Cuba's first painter", having been the earliest native-born artist to create a large, surviving body of professional work.

== Life ==
José Nicolás de Escalera was born in Havana, Spanish Cuba to an Andalusian father and a Creole mother on 8 September 1734. Little is known about his artistic education; he appears to have been self-trained, and his work bears some resemblance to that of the eighteenth-century Andalusian school, especially paintings by Bartolomé Esteban Murillo. Most of his work was religious in nature. He is particularly known for the oils that adorn the cupola of the Church of Santa María del Rosario, erected by the Counts of Bayona from 1760 - 1766. He also executed works at the Convent of San Francisco in Havana (Regina Angelorum) and the Church of Our Lady of Candelaria in Guanabacoa (San José with the sleeping child and The Coronation of the Virgin by the Holy Trinity).

De Escalera occasionally did portraits, such as his painting of Luis Vicente de Velasco, a Spanish Navy officer who was killed in action during the siege of Havana. This was offered to Charles III of Spain in 1763, and remains in the collection of the Naval Museum of Madrid. De Escalera worked mainly in oils. He was the first Cuban-born artist known to have left a sizable body of work; he is also the first Cuban fine artist to have depicted slaves, as seen in his work Santo Domingo preaches to the Bayonne and Chacón family at the Church of Santa Maria del Rosario. He likely saw himself as a devout craftsman simply executing commissions for patrons in a popular baroque style, and was not especially concerned with originality; however, some of his works, such as Virgen (1801), show glimmers of the bold, colorful naturalism which would one day come to define Cuban art.

There are about fifty known examples of his work in collections in Cuba, Spain, and the United States, including many which can be seen at the Museo Nacional de Bellas Artes de La Habana, and the College of San Geronimo's Jose Nicolas de Escalera Art Gallery in Havana. A handful remain in the churches and institutions where they were originally painted. De Escalera died in Havana on 3 July 1804.

== Gallery ==
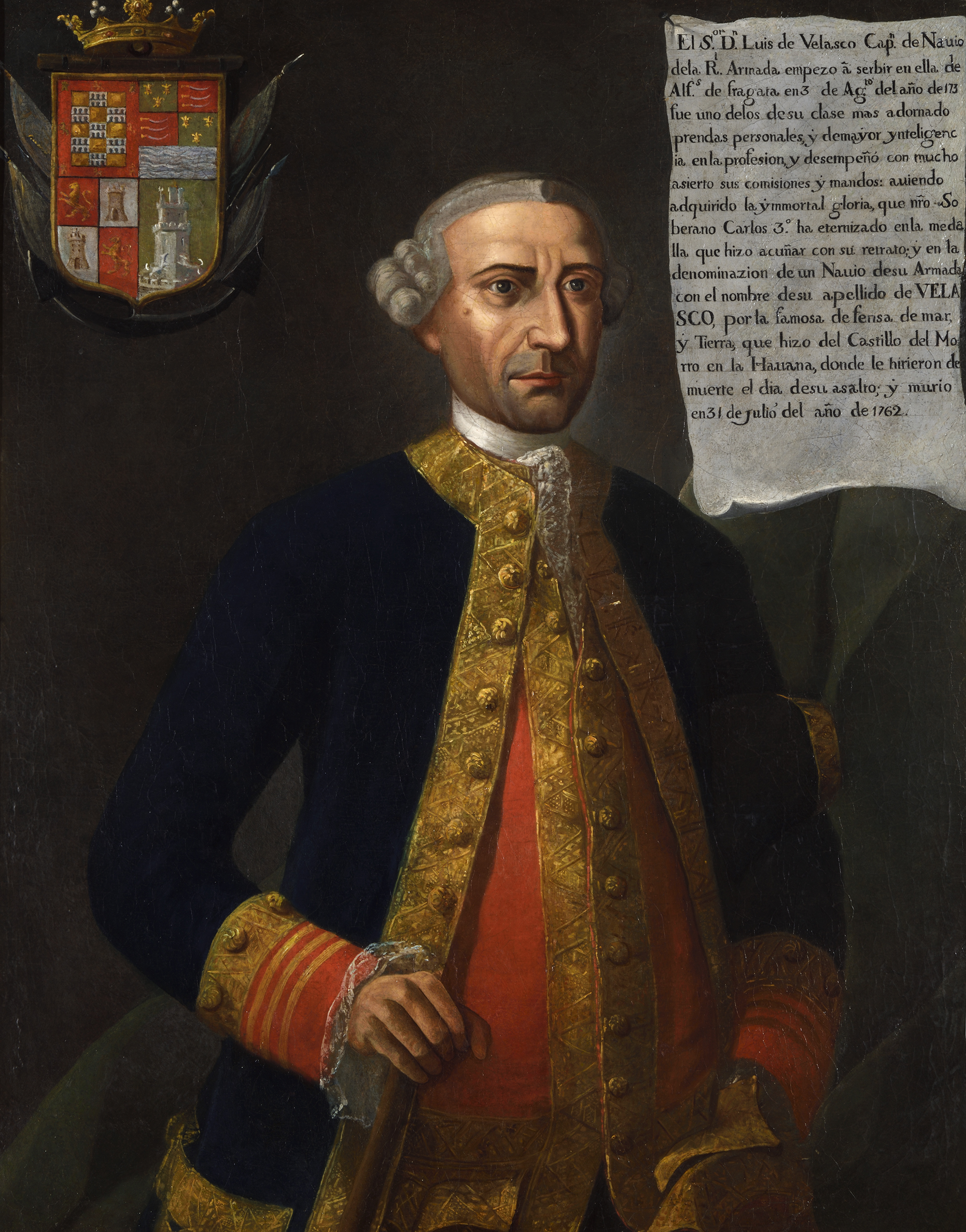
Luis Vicente de Velasco (c. 1763)

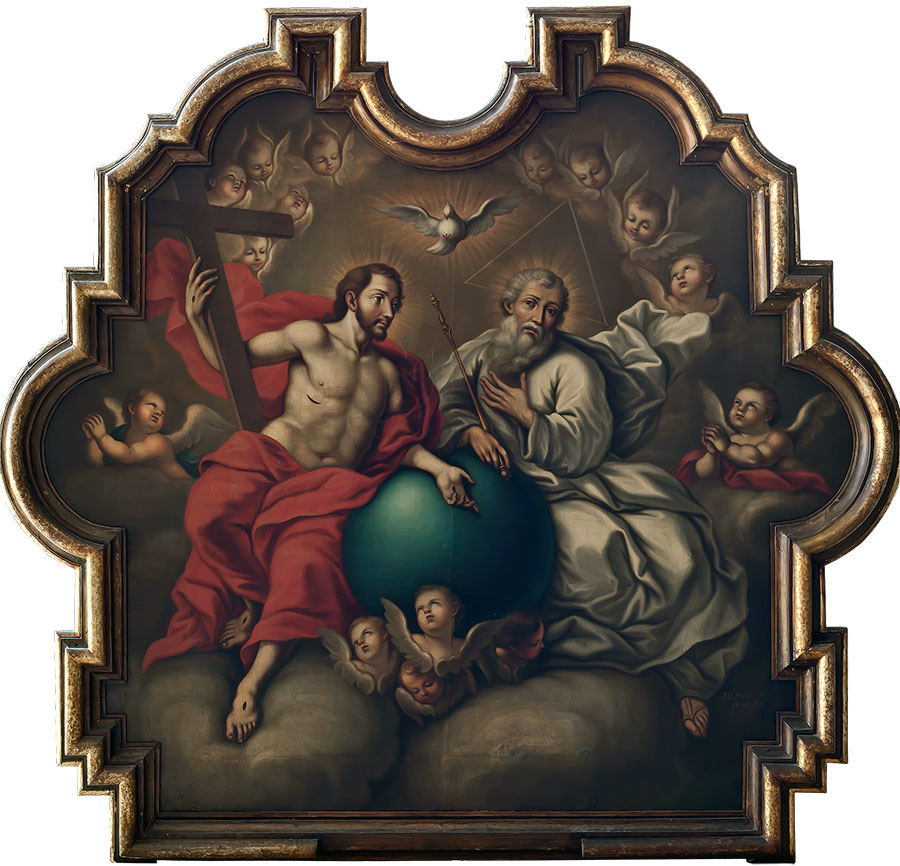
The Most Holy Trinity (c. 1770)

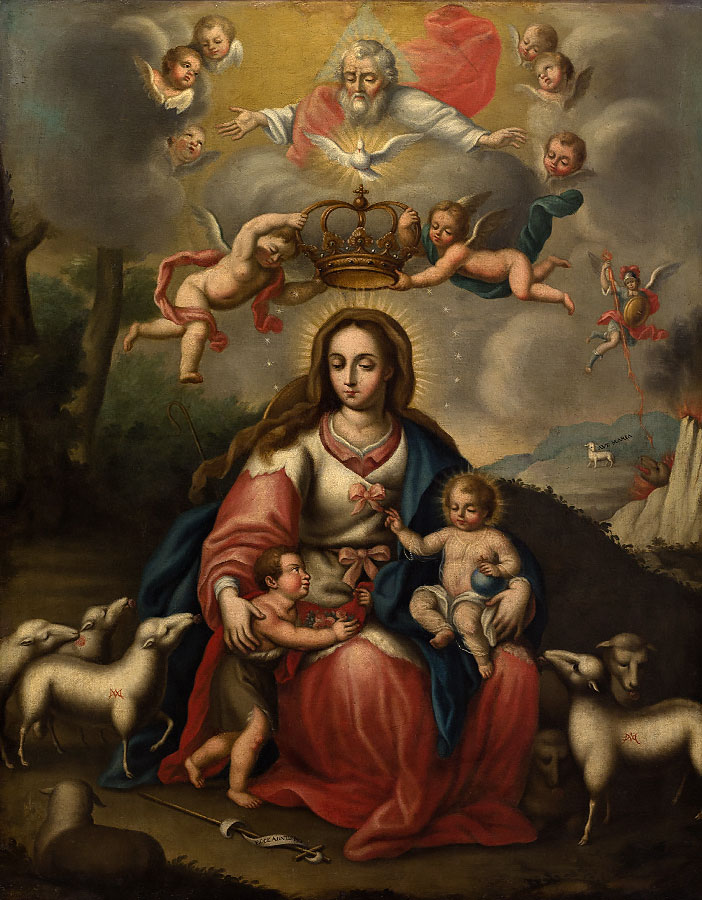
The Divine Shepherdess (Date unknown)

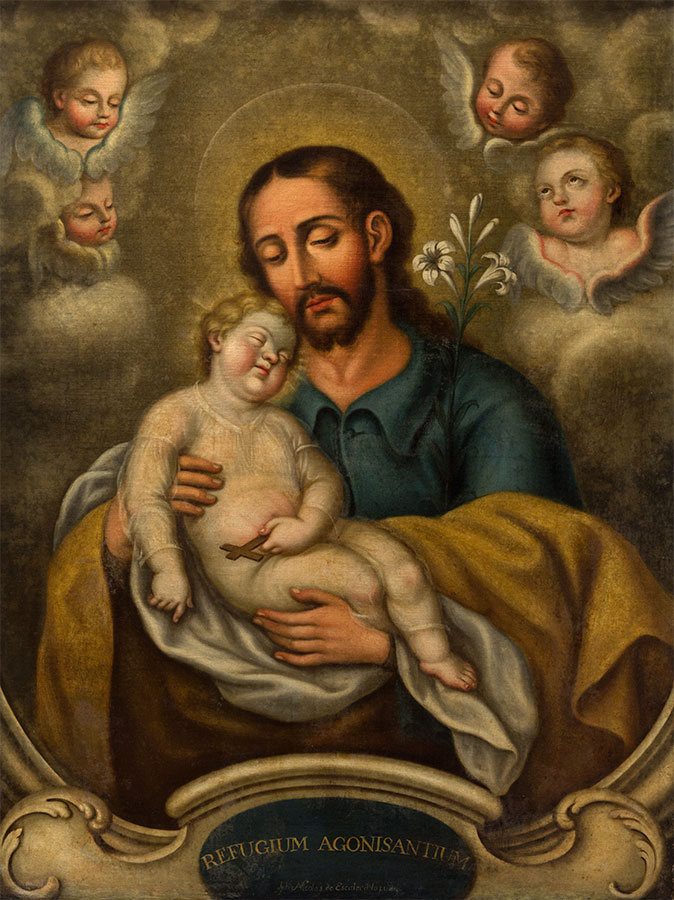
Saint Joseph and the Child (Date unknown)

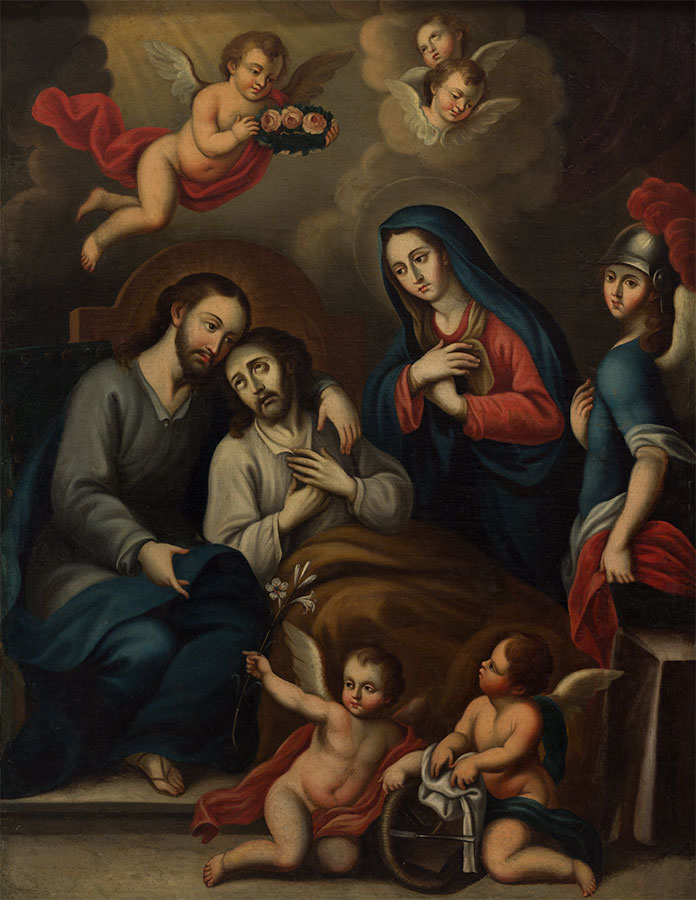
The death of Saint Joseph (Date unknown)
