= Spanish ship America =

Ship of the line of the Spanish Navy

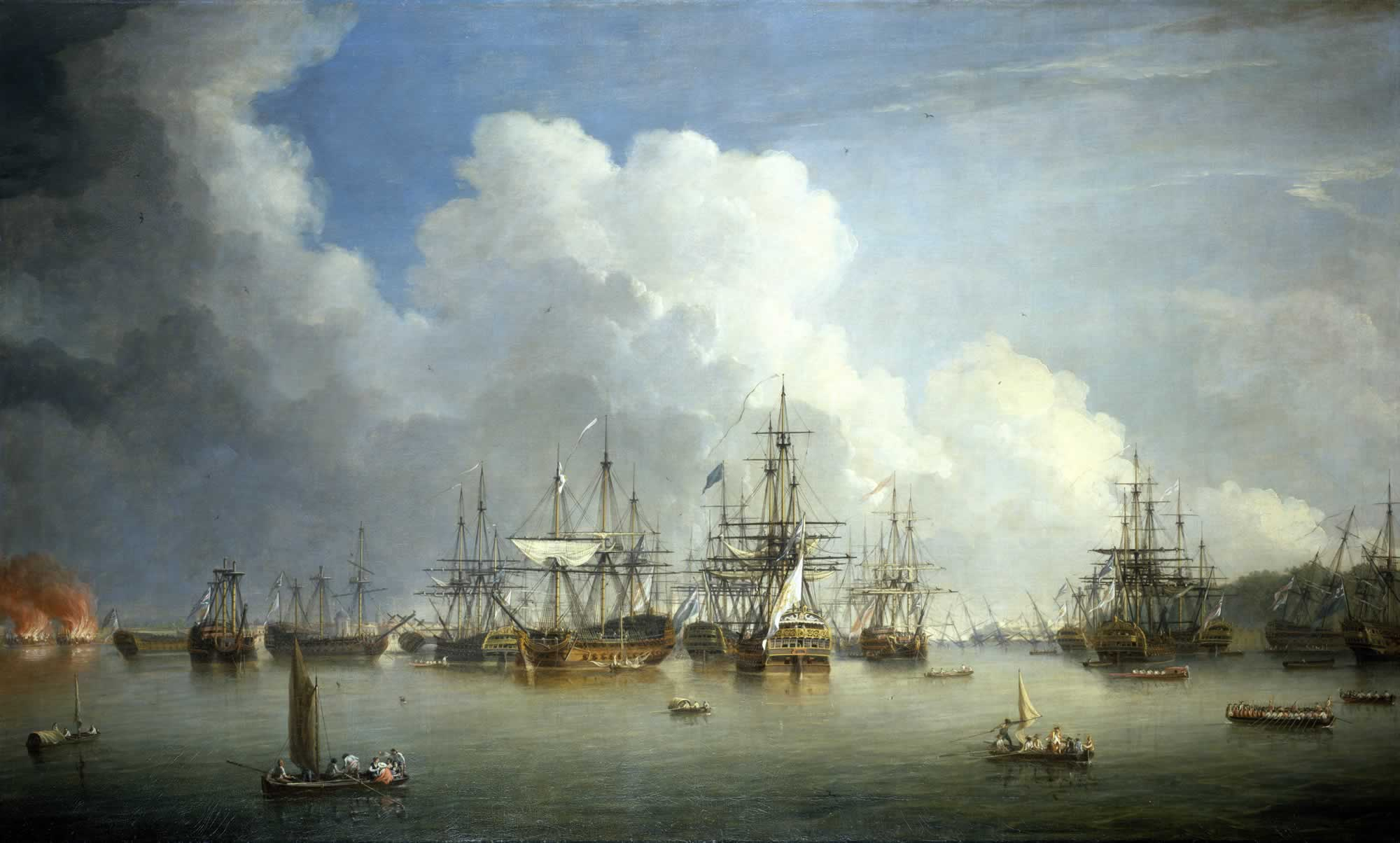
- Painting by Dominic Serres depicting captured Spanish warships at Havana; América is possibly among them

History

Spain
- Name: América
- Ordered: 7 May 1731
- Builder: Juan de Acosta, at Havana
- Launched: 21 January 1736
- Captured: 13 August 1762, by the Royal Navy
- Fate: Burnt

América was a 60-gun ship of the line of the Spanish Navy. Launched in 1736, she was captured by the British at the siege of Havana on 13 August 1762 and burnt.
