= Velasco (disambiguation) =

Velasco is a Spanish surname and given name.

Velasco may also refer to:

== Geography ==
- Velasco (La Rioja), Spain
- Velasco, Texas, United States
- Velasco Reef, Kayangel, Republic of Palau

=== Bolivia ===
- José Miguel de Velasco Province
  - San Ignacio de Velasco
  - San Miguel de Velasco
  - San Rafael de Velasco
  - Santa Ana de Velasco

== Astronomy ==
- 20719 Velasco, an asteroid

== History ==
- Battle of Velasco (1832), between the Republic of Mexico and a rebelling Mexican state
- Treaties of Velasco (1836), between the republics of Mexico and Texas

== Ships ==
- Spanish ship Velasco, various Spanish Navy ships
- Velasco-class cruiser, a class of Spanish Navy protected cruisers
