= Gutierre de Hevia =

Spanish Navy officer

The Most Excellent Gutierre de Hevia y Valdés, Marqués del Real Transporte
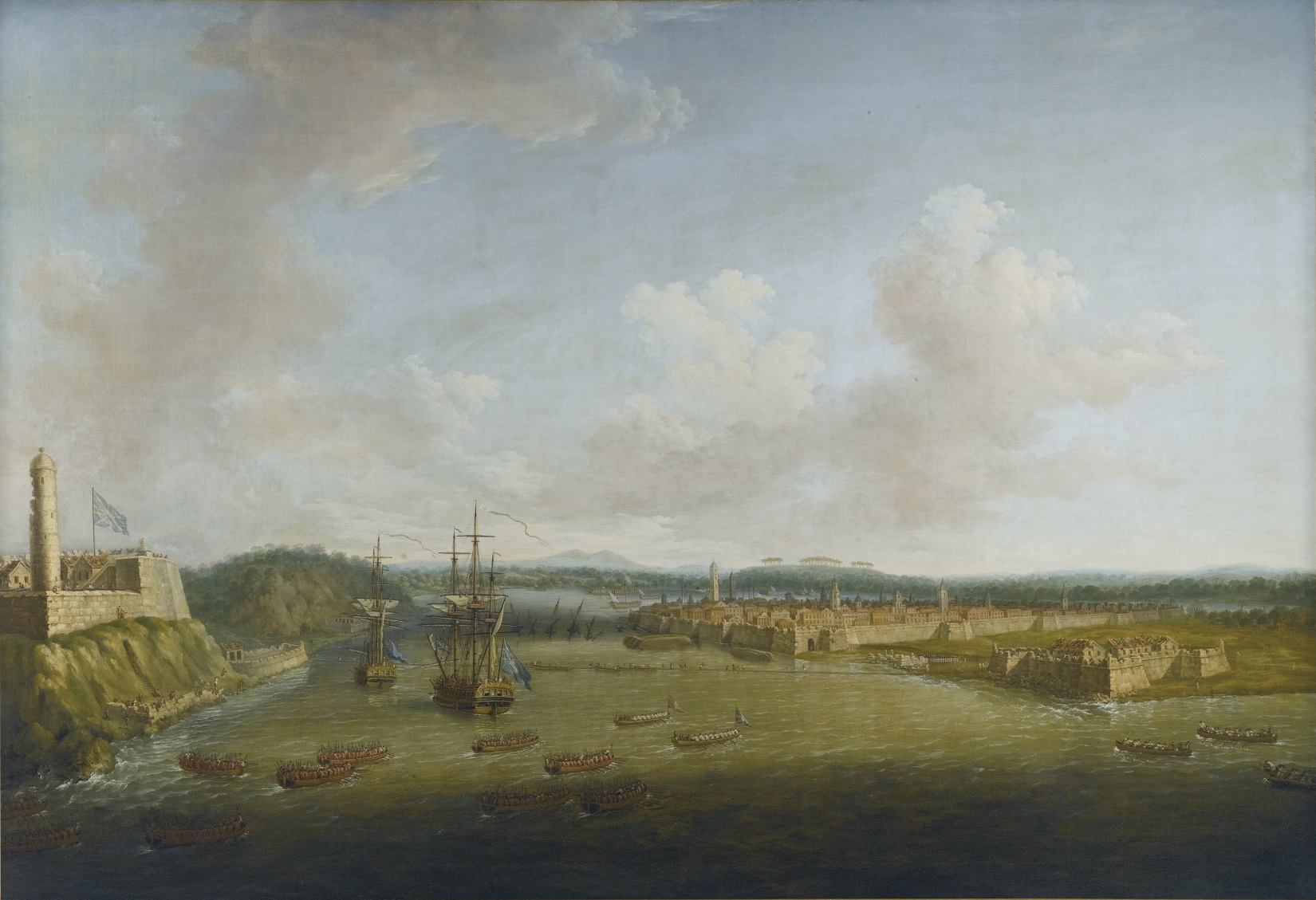
- Fall of Havana, 1762; de Hevia was court-martialled for his role in its capture

Commandant General of Spanish Marine Infantry
- In office 1759–1772

Personal details
- Born: 1704 Tortona, Piedmont
- Died: 2 December 1772 (aged 68) Cádiz, Spain
- Spouse(s): Rosalía Navarro y Gauset, II Marquesa de la Victoria
- Children: María Lutgarda de Hevia y Navarro (1758-1837)

Military service
- Rank: Admiral
- Battles/wars: Recapture of Oran; War of Jenkins' Ear; Cartagena de Indias; Seven Years' War; Siege of Havana

Admiral Gutierre de Hevia y Valdés (1704 – 2 December 1772) was a Spanish Navy officer who became commander of the Spanish Marine Infantry. He was court-martialled for his role in the 1762 British capture of Havana but reinstated three years later.

== Biography ==
Born at Tortona, Piedmont, he joined the Spanish Navy in 1720. In Cádiz, he was involved in a duel and killed his opponent. He was tried but acquitted, and left for the Americas. He entered service in the Spanish Navy, and was the third man to set foot on enemy territory during the recapture of Oran in 1732.

During the War of Jenkins' Ear in 1741, he served in the successful defence of Cartagena de Indias and in 1747 received his first command, the warship Nueva España. In 1759 he commanded the Fenix, part of the convoy that brought the new monarch, Charles III of Spain, from Naples to Spain. For this service, he received the titles of Marqués del Real Transporte and Vizconde del Buen Viaje, was promoted Capitán de navío, and confirmed as Commandant General of the Spanish Marine Infantry.

In 1761, Hevia and his fleet of 12 ships was dispatched to Havana, to defend the city against an expected assault by the British, as Spain had entered the Seven Years' War that year on the side of France. On 6 June 1762 a powerful British invasion force under the Earl of Albemarle began the Siege of Havana. Hevia's ships played no part in the battle, as all the guns and men were disembarked and used to defend the forts. When the city was taken on 13 August, the British confiscated Hevia's entire fleet, which he had neglected to burn.

Hevia and the surviving Spanish sailors and marines were transported to Spain. On his arrival, the Madrid government court-martial him. He was stripped of his titles and condemned to house arrest for 10 years but thanks to the influence of his father-in-law Juan José Navarro, who was Captain general of the Navy, Hevia was pardoned on 17 September 1765 on the occasion of the wedding of Charles, the Prince of Asturia and reinstated in his previous titles. He died on 2 December 1772 at Isla de León.

== Sources ==
- Biografía de don Gutierre de Hevia ó Evia y Valdés (Spanish)
