= Belasco (surname) =

Belasco is a surname. Notable people with the surname include:

- David Belasco (1853–1931), American theatrical producer and playwright
- David James (David Belasco, 1839–1893), English comic actor
- Jay Belasco (1888–1949), American film actor
- Leon Belasco (1902–1988), Russian-American musician and actor
- Lionel Belasco (1881–1967), composer and bandleader
- Nic Belasco (born 1973), professional basketball player
- Walter Belasco (1864–1939), Canadian silent film actor
