= Juan de Prado Mayera Portocarrero y Luna =

Spanish Army officer and colonial administraotr

Mariscal de campo Juan de Prado Malleza Portocarrero y Luna (1716 – c. 1770) was a Spanish Army officer and colonial administrator who served as the governor of Cuba from 1761 to 1762, when British forces captured the city during the Seven Years' War.

== Biography ==
Born at León, Spain, he was the second son of the 2nd Marquess of Prado and Acapulco and 5th Count of Óbedos, and had a career in the Spanish Army, where he became mariscal de campo.

In mid-1760, Juan de Prado was named governor of Cuba by Charles III of Spain but did not take possession of his office until 7 February 1761. He was ordered to strengthen the island's fortresses against an expected offensive by the British, as Spain had entered the Seven Years' War that year on the side of France.

On February 7, 1761, the first works to fortify the heights of La Cabaña, overlooking the bay, and the main fortress el Morro, were begun. That same year, the city was hit by an epidemic of yellow fever that caused numerous victims among the urban population. The work force was so decimated that work on the fortifications was practically paralyzed.

On June 6, 1762, a British expeditionary force under George Keppel began the siege of Havana. Juan de Prado took command of the defense, but the city was eventually captured on the 13th of August.

Juan de Prado and the surviving Spanish soldiers were transported back to Spain. Upon his arrival, the Spanish government tried him via a court-martial. He was convicted of incompetence and a lack of energy in the defence of Havana, and was sentenced to death, but the sentence was commuted to ten years' imprisonment. He died in prison at Vitigudino.

== Sources ==
- Real Academia de la Historia

Government offices
Preceded by Francisco Cajigal de la Vega	Governor of Cuba; 1761–1762	Succeeded by British Suzerainty
