= Spanish ship Reina =

Ship of the line of the Spanish Navy

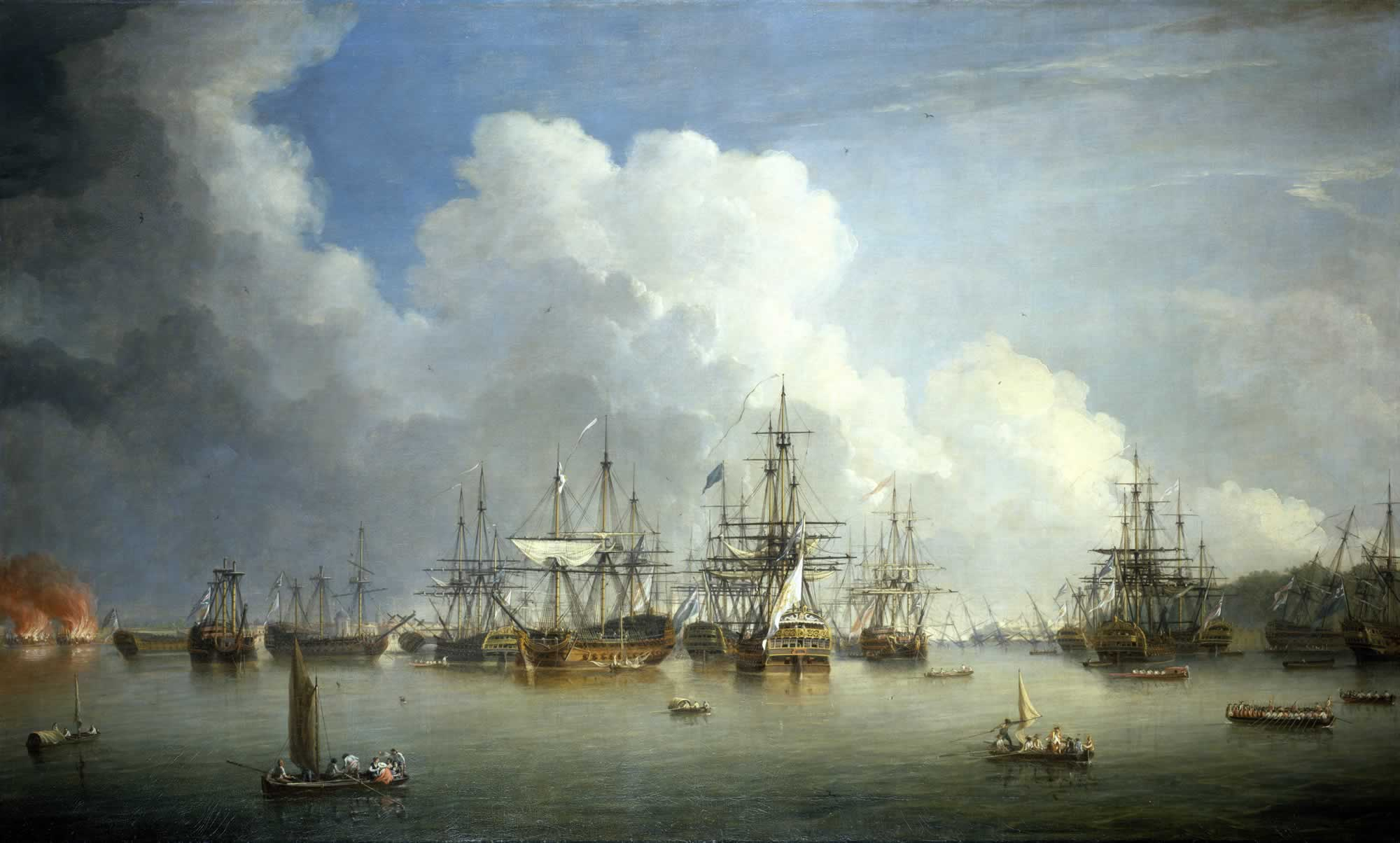
- Painting by Dominic Serres depicting captured Spanish warships at Havana; Reina is possibly among them

History

Spain
- Name: Reyna
- Launched: 1743
- Captured: 13 August 1762, by Royal Navy

Great Britain
- Name: HMS Reyna
- Acquired: 13 August 1762
- Fate: Sold, 1772

General characteristics
- Class & type: 70-gun ship of the line
- Tons burthen: 1849 tons
- Length: 175 ft (53.3 m) (gundeck)
- Beam: 48 ft 7 in (14.8 m)
- Depth of hold: 22 ft 1 in (6.7 m)
- Sail plan: Full-rigged ship
- Armament: 70 guns of various weights of shot

Reina was a 70-gun ship of the line of the Spanish Navy. Launched in 1743, she was captured by the British during the siege of Havana on 13 August 1762, and commissioned into the Royal Navy as the 74-gun third-rate HMS Reyna. She was sold out of the navy in 1772.

== See also ==
- List of ships captured in the 18th century
