= Belasco Theatre (disambiguation) =

The Belasco Theatre is a Broadway theatre is New York City.

Other theatres that use or have used the name include:

- Belasco Theater (Los Angeles), on Hill Street in Los Angeles
- Follies Theater, formerly Belasco Theater, on Main Street in Los Angeles
- Lafayette Square Opera House, formerly Belasco Theatre, in Washington, D.C.
- New Victory Theater, formerly Belasco Theatre, on 42nd Street in Manhattan
