= Siege of Havana =

1762 siege of the Seven Years' War

- Part of the Anglo-Spanish War and the Seven Years' War
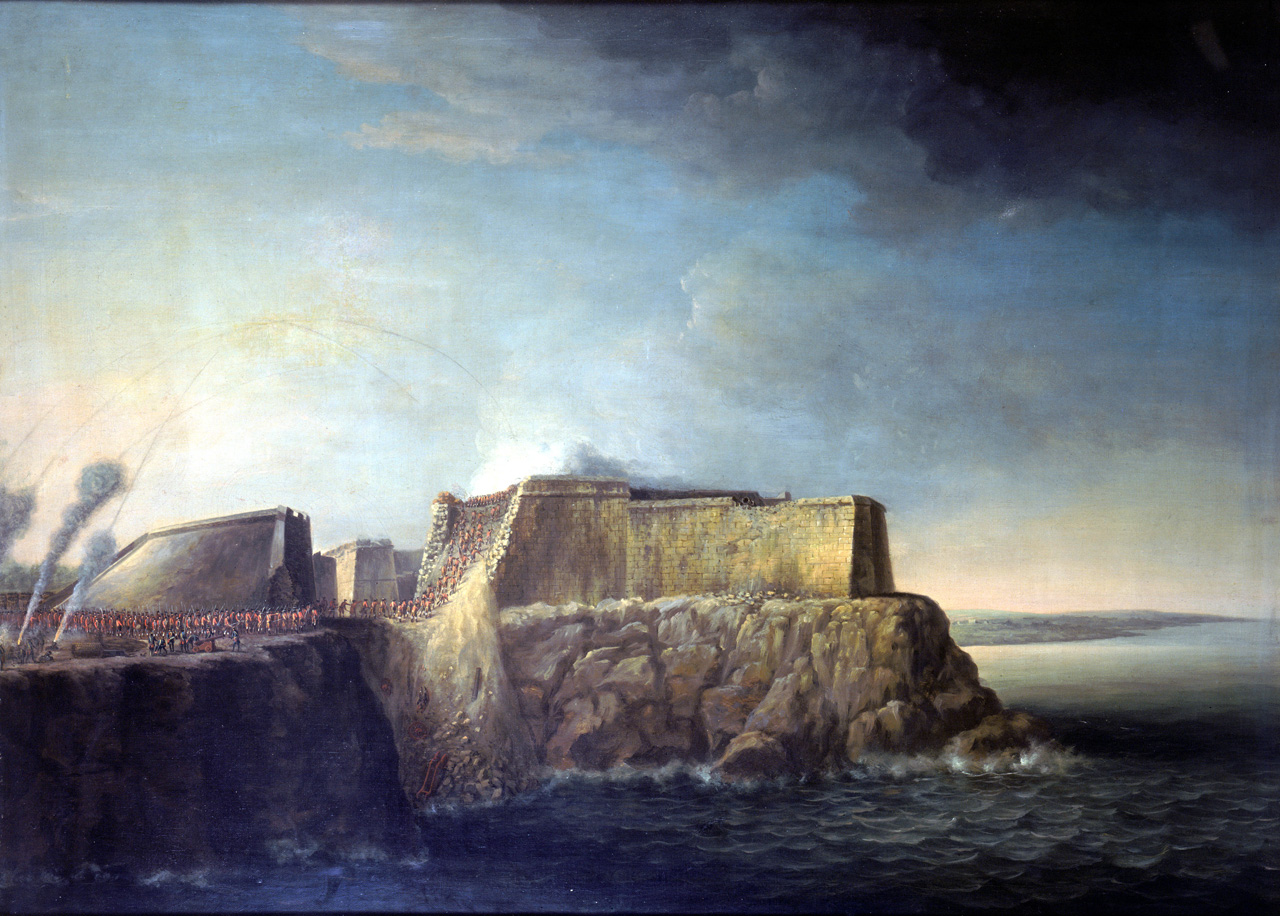
- British troops storming Morro Castle on 30 July
Date	6 June – 13 August 1762
Location	Havana, Captaincy General of Cuba 23.0964°N 82.3747°W
Result	British victory
Territorial changes	Havana occupied by the British until the Treaty of Paris

Belligerents
Great Britain; British America	Spain

Commanders and leaders
George Keppel; George Pocock; George Eliott; Ralph Burton	Juan de Prado (surrendered); Gutierre de Hevia (surrendered); Luis Vicente de Velasco †; José de Velasco (surrendered)

Strength
31,000; 23 ships of the line 11 frigates 4 sloops-of-war 3 bomb vessels 1 cutter 160 troopships	11,670; 10 ships of the line 2 corvettes 2 sloops 100 merchantmen

Casualties and losses
2,764 killed, wounded, captured, missing or died of disease	3,800 killed or died of disease 2,000 wounded or sick 5,000 captured 10 ships of the line captured 2 corvettes captured 2 sloops captured 100 merchantmen captured

The siege of Havana was the capture of the Spanish-held city of Havana, Cuba in 1762 as part of the war between Britain and Spain which formed part of the larger Seven Years' War. After the Spanish abandoned their former policy of neutrality by signing the family compact with France, Britain declared war on Spain in January 1762. The British government decided to mount an attack on the important Spanish naval base of Havana, with the intention of weakening the Spanish West Indies and improving the security of its own American colonies. A Royal Navy force consisting of squadrons from Britain and the West Indies, escorting 160 troopships, were able to approach Havana from a direction that neither Governor Juan de Prado nor Admiral Gutierre de Hevia expected and were able to trap de Hevia's fleet in the Havana harbour and land their troops with relatively little resistance.

The Spanish decided on a strategy of delaying the British attack until the strength of the city's defences and the onset of seasonal rains inflicting tropical diseases would significantly reduce the size of the attacking force via disease, along with the start of hurricane season would force the British fleet to seek a safe anchorage. However, the city's main fortress, the Morro Castle was overlooked by a hill that de Prado had neglected to fortify; the British installed batteries there and bombarded the fortress daily with heavy shelling. The fortress eventually fell after its commander Luis Vicente de Velasco was mortally wounded by a stray bullet. The capture of Morro Castle led to the eventual fall of the rest of the fortifications and the surrender of the city and its garrison before the hurricane season began.

The surrender of Havana led to substantial rewards for the British commanders and smaller amounts of prize money for other officers and men. De Prado, de Hevia and other senior Spanish officers were court-martialled upon their return to Spain and punished for their failures to conduct a better defence and allowing de Hevia's fleet to fall intact into the British hands. Havana remained under British occupation until February 1763, when it was returned to Spain under the 1763 Treaty of Paris that ended the Seven Years' War.

== Background ==
Havana in the late 18th century was a major port and naval base, and also the strongest fortress in Spanish America. Its royal shipyard with access to abundant supplies of resistant hardwoods was capable of building first-rate ships of the line and had been developed by the Bourbon monarchy as the most important of its three naval shipyards. There had been several previous plans to attack Havana, including one proposed to Vernon in 1739, which he rejected in favour of an attack on Porto Bello, but no successful attack since it was comprehensively fortified, and the strength of its fortifications and difficulty that large sailing warships would have in making an undetected approach from the north convinced the Spanish commanders it would be virtually impossible to capture, if its fortifications were in good order and it was properly garrisoned. Its wealth and ability to feed its population also suggested that it could resist being starved into surrender.

Britain had been formally at war with France since May 1756, but Spain under Ferdinand VI remained neutral. After Ferdinand's death in 1759, his half-brother Charles III, reversed Ferdinand's policy and, by the Treaty of Paris (1761), re-established the so-called Family Compact between France and Spain. This treaty involved an offensive alliance directed against Britain, and in December 1761, Spain placed an embargo on British trade, seized British goods in Spain and expelled British merchants. In response to this, Britain declared war on Spain in January 1762.

=== Spanish preparations ===
Before involving his country in the conflict raging in Europe and across the world, Charles III made provisions to defend the Spanish colonies against the Royal Navy. For the defence of Cuba, he appointed Juan de Prado as Captain General of Cuba, which was an administrative rather than a military position. De Prado arrived at Havana in February 1761 and began construction efforts to improve the fortifications of the city, although the work was incomplete at the time of the siege.

In June 1761, a flotilla of seven ships of the line under the command of Admiral Gutierre de Hevia arrived at Havana, transporting two infantry regiments of regulars (the España and Aragón regiments) totalling 996 men, bringing up the number of the Havana garrison to 2,400 regulars. There were also 6,300 sailors and marines aboard the ships. However, yellow fever had reduced the effective defending forces of the city by the time the siege began to 1,900 regulars, 750 marines, around 5,000 sailors and 2,000 to 3,000 militia, besides several thousand more without muskets or training to operate them. The main garrison consisted of:

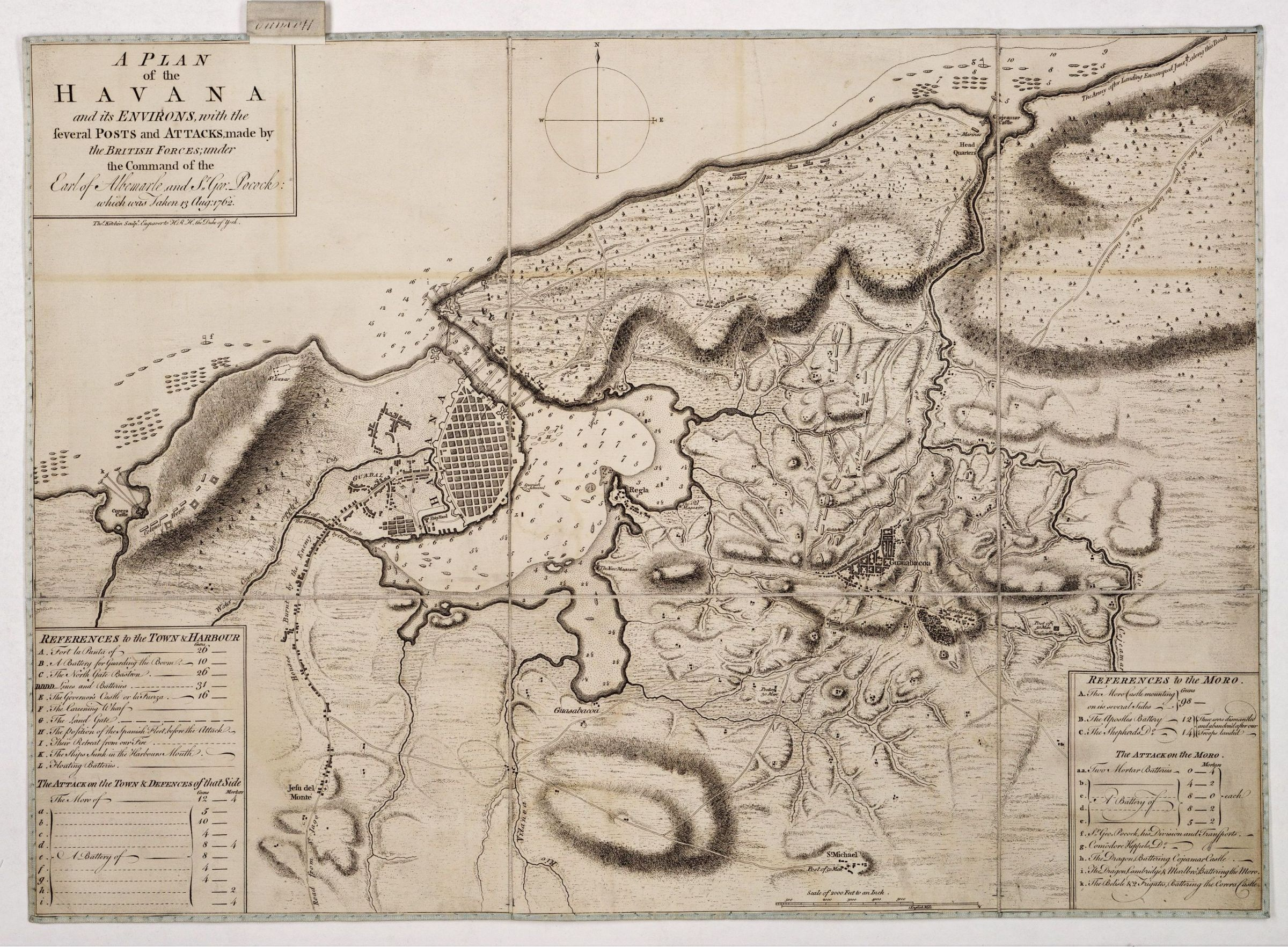
A plan of Havana and its environs in 1762, by Thomas Kitchen

- España Infantry Regiment (481 men)
- Aragón Infantry Regiment (265 men)
- Havana Infantry Regiment (856 men)
- Edinburgh's Dragoons (150 men)
- Army gunners (104 men)
- Navy gunners and marines (750 men )

Havana had one of the finest natural harbours in the West Indies with a 180 m wide and 800 m long entrance channel giving access to the harbour. Two strong fortresses defended the entrance channel. On the north side of the channel stood the very strong Castillo de los Tres Reyes del Morro (known in English as Morro Castle) on the rocky Cavannos Ridge. It had 64 artillery pieces and was garrisoned by 700 men. However, it had been noted that most of its guns faced Havana's port and bay, and that it was overlooked by the unfortified hill of La Cabaña. Although it had been proposed to fortify La Cabaña, the project had been delayed and no guns had been installed there by the start of the siege. The south side was defended by the older Castillo de San Salvador de la Punta. The channel could also be blocked by a boom chain extending from El Morro to La Punta. Havana itself lay on the south side along the channel and was surrounded by a wall 5 kilometres (3.1 mi) long.

=== British preparations ===
Two days after the declaration of war with Spain, on the advice of Lord Anson, the British cabinet chose Havana as a major objective in its attack on Spain because of its strategic importance, believing that its permanent loss would weaken Spanish influence in the Caribbean. Detailed plans were made for a combined naval and military attack on Havana, relying on the Royal Navy's superiority in numbers and effectiveness over the Spanish fleet. Admiral Sir George Pocock, with seven ships-of-the-line and a frigate and Commodore Keppel his second-in-command, was to transport a military force under the command of George Keppel, 3rd Earl of Albemarle to the West Indies, to join the West Indies naval squadron, then under the command of Rear-Admiral Rodney, who was undertaking operations against Martinique, taking on additional troops there. The fleet was then to proceed to the northwest of Saint-Domingue (present-day Haiti) to embark 4,000 men from the British colonies in North America, commanded by Jeffrey Amherst, and be further reinforced by a squadron from Port Royal, Jamaica, commanded by Sir James Douglas. It was to keep its final destination in doubt until it launched its amphibious attack on Havana.

These plans were modified to meet circumstances, as Rodney and Robert Monckton commanding the troops had captured Martinique before Pocock sailed, 3,000 British and American troops from New York did not arrive at Havana until late July, and the plan to take up to 2,000 slaves from Jamaica to act as pioneers only produced 600 slaves, as many owners were reluctant to part with them without a scheme for compensation. A plan by Amherst to assemble a force of 8,000 men for an attack on Louisiana was dismissed by Albemarle as impractical as it would have left too few troops in the North American colonies.

During the month of February, British troops embarked; they consisted of:

- 22nd Regiment of Foot
- 34th Regiment of Foot
- 56th Regiment of Foot
- 72nd Richmond's Regiment of Foot

On 5 March the British expedition sailed from Spithead, England, with 7 ships of the line and 4,365 men aboard 64 transports and shops carrying supplies and artillery. The fleet arrived in Barbados on 20 April. Five days later the expedition reached Fort Royal on the recently conquered island of Martinique where it picked up the remainder of Major-General Robert Monckton's expedition, still numbering 8,461 men. Rear Admiral Rodney's squadron, amounting to 8 ships of the line also joined the expedition bringing the total number of ships of the line to 15. There was some friction between Rodney and Pocock, as the latter had been preferred for the naval command of this important expedition. On 23 May the expedition, now off the northwest corner of Saint-Domingue, was further reinforced by Sir James Douglas' squadron from Port Royal, Jamaica. The combined force now amounted to 21 ships of the line, 24 lesser warships, and 168 other vessels, carrying some 14,000 seamen and marines plus another 3,000 hired sailors and 12,826 regulars.

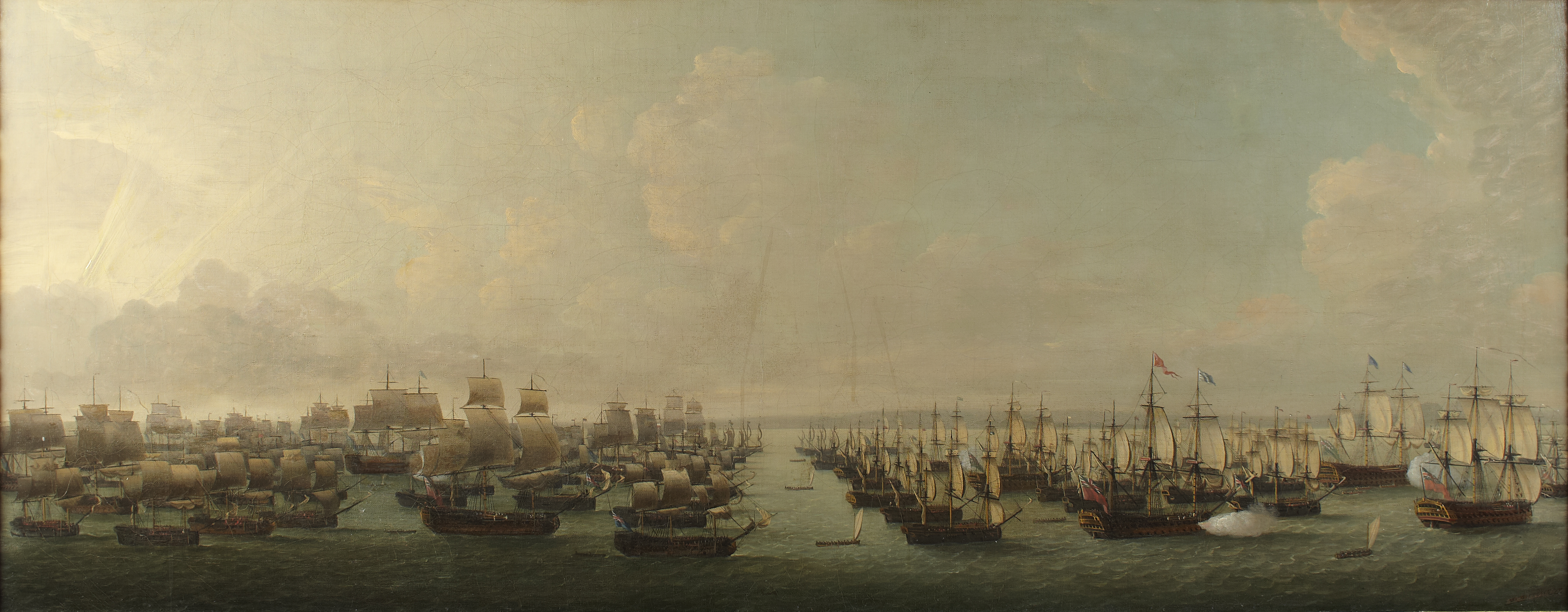
The British expeditionary fleet

== Siege ==
The normal approach to Havana, on the north coast of Cuba, was to sail west parallel to the south coast of the island on the prevailing south-easterly wind, then to round its western tip and sail east towards Havana, against the wind. This last section, more than 200 miles long, would take a large squadron at least one week, and probably several, to complete, giving ample warning for Havana to prepare. To the north of Havana, reaching as far as the Bahamas, is a wide expanse of shallow water, reefs and small islands or cays, accessible only to small boats except for one deep water channel, the Old Bahama Channel which is only some 10 miles wide at its narrowest. Although the Spanish navigators that charted it thought too dangerous for large warships, it was surveyed by a British frigate, whose captain left parties of his men in the cays to mark the extremities of the channel, allowing the whole fleet to pass through it, safely and undetected.

On 6 June the British force came into sight of Havana. Immediately, 12 British ships of the line were sent to the mouth of the entrance channel to block in the Spanish fleet. After surveying the city's defences, the British planned to begin the operations with the reduction of the Morro fortress, on the north side of the channel, through a formal Vauban-style siege. The commanding position of this fort over the city would then force the Spanish commander to surrender. However, the initial survey had underestimated the strength of the Morro fortress, which was located on a rocky promontory where it was impossible to dig approach trenches and that a large ditch cut into the rock protected the fort on the land side.

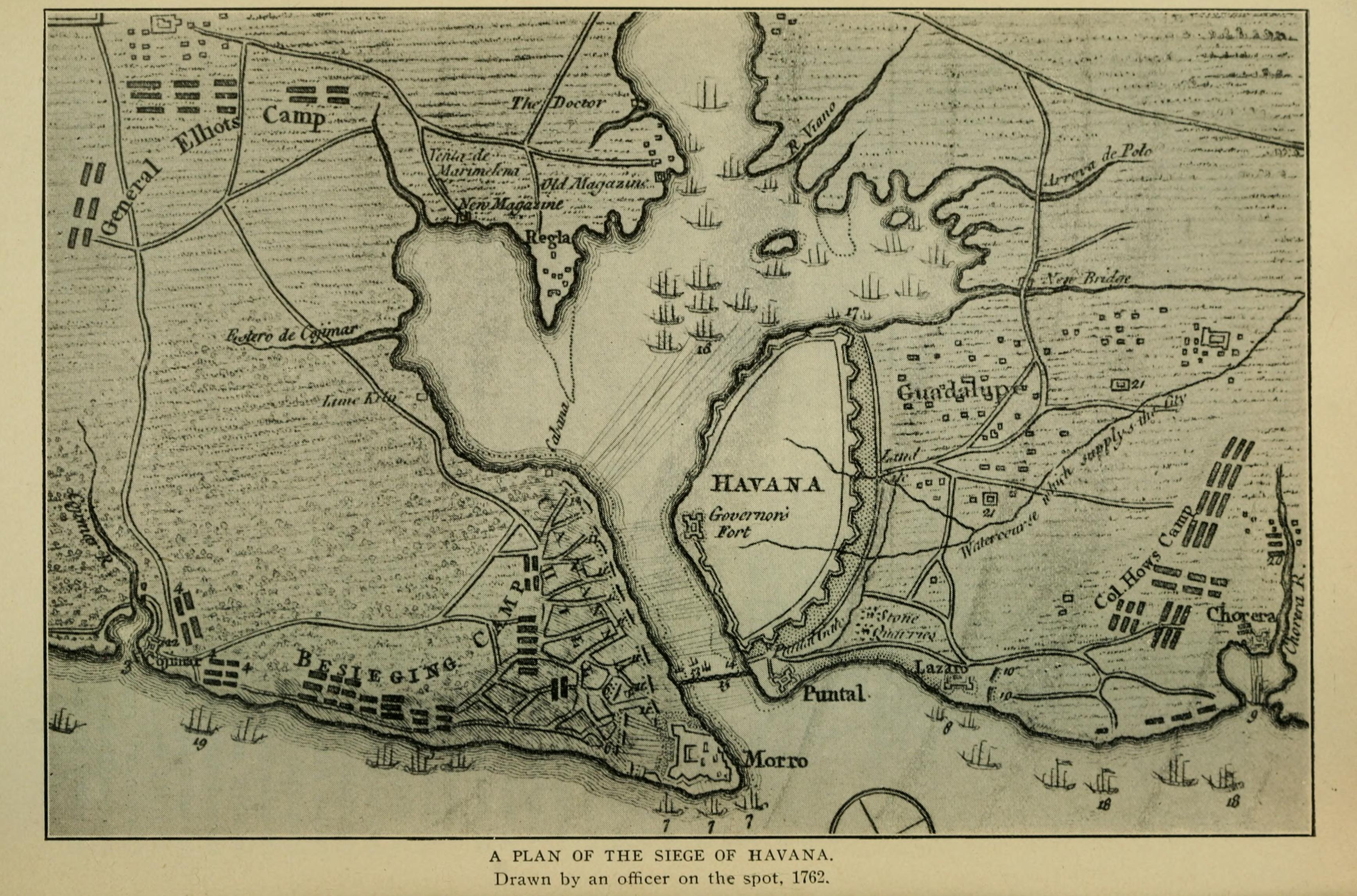
Map of the siege

Although Prado had received information of the presence of British ships two days before its arrival from a frigate that had escaped from the port of Matanzas, he did not believe that major warships could navigate the Old Bahama Channel. Prado and Admiral Hevia, surprised by the size of the attacking force, adopted a delaying defensive strategy. Prado wrote to the French in Saint-Domingue and to Spain for relief forces to be sent. He also requested reinforcements from Santiago de Cuba, which had the second strongest military force on the island, and although two relief forces set out from the Oriente Province in July, both were delayed by food shortages and high levels of sickness. One turned back and the other was still one day's march from Havana when the city surrendered. Besides hope of a relief force, Prado and the Havana garrison had several advantages. Firstly, the hurricane season would begin in late August, putting the British fleet in danger: the wet weather starting earlier in that month would probably also initiate an outbreak of yellow fever among the besiegers. Secondly, despite some losses from tropical diseases Prado had 1,500 Spanish regular soldiers and some 2,300 colonial militiamen, as well as sailors from the fleet.

There were initially 12 Spanish ships of the line in the harbour, besides two others newly constructed but not manned, and also several smaller warships and around 100 merchant ships. The presence of so many merchant ships dissuaded the council from ordering the Spanish fleet to disrupt the British landings, which was also in accordance with the instructions that Admiral Hevia had received when he left Spain to protect Cuba's commerce The fleet's gunners and marines were sent to garrison the fortresses of Morro and Punta which were placed under the command of naval officers. Most of the shot and powder of the fleet as well as its best guns were also transferred to these two fortresses. Meanwhile, regular troops were assigned to the defence of the city. Prado also ordered all women, children and the old and infirm to leave the city, leaving only men able to bear arms.

The channel entrance was immediately closed with the boom chain. Additionally, three ships of the line (Asia (64), Europa (64) and Neptuno (74)) were selected on account of their poor condition and sunk behind the boom chain. Although this made the remaining Spanish warships unable to leave the harbour, they were clearly outnumbered by the British fleet, and this move made the sailors available to defend the city. Realising the importance of the Morro, the Spanish commanders gave it top priority.

The following day British troops were landed northeast of Havana, and began advancing west the next day. They met a militia party that was easily pushed back. By the end of the day, British infantry had reached the vicinity of Havana. The defence of the Morro was assigned to Luis Vicente de Velasco e Isla, a naval officer, who immediately took measures to prepare and provision the fortress for a siege.

=== Siege of El Morro ===
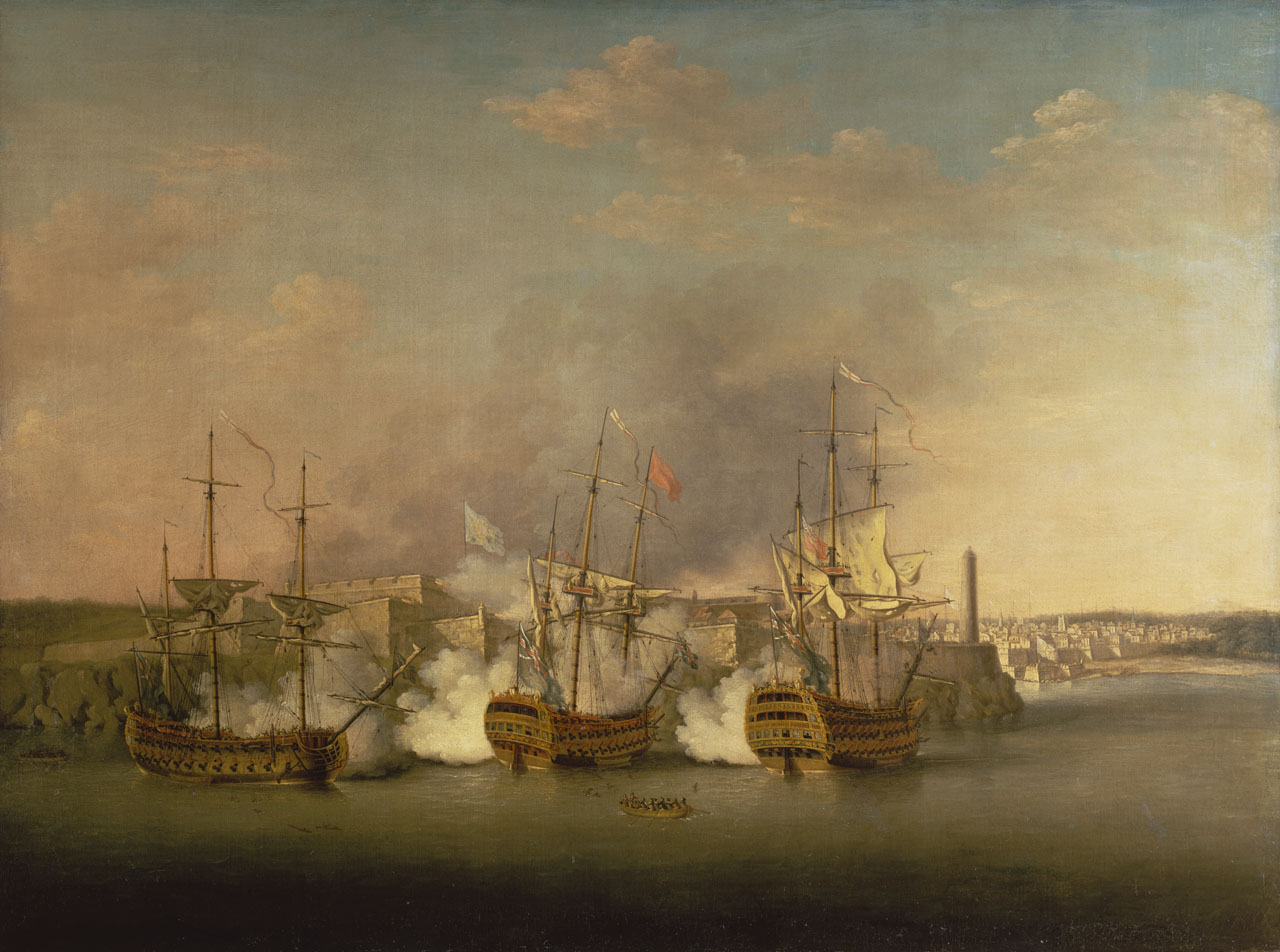
Bombardment of the Morro Castle, Havana, 1 July 1762 by Richard Paton

On 11 June a British party stormed a detached redoubt on the La Cabaña heights. Only then did the British command realise how strong the Morro was, surrounded by brushwood and protected by a large ditch. With the arrival of their siege train the next day, the British began erecting batteries among the trees on La Cabaña hill overlooking the Morro (some 7 metres (23 ft) higher) as well as the city and the bay. Surprisingly, this hill had been left undefended by the Spanish army despite its well-known strategic importance. Charles III of Spain had earlier instructed Prado to fortify this hill, a task that he considered the most urgent of those relating to the fortifications. The task had been started but no guns had been installed.

Two days later a British detachment landed at Torreón de la Chorrera, on the west side of the harbour. Meanwhile, Colonel Patrick Mackellar, an engineer, was overseeing the construction of the siege works against the Morro. Since digging trenches was impossible, he resolved to erect breastworks instead. He planned to mine towards a bastion of the Morro once his siege works would have reached the ditch and to create a runway across this ditch with the rubble produced by his mining activities.

By 22 June, four British batteries totalling twelve heavy guns and 38 mortars opened fire on the Morro from La Cabaña. Mackellar gradually advanced his breastworks towards the ditch under cover of these batteries so by the end of the month the British had increased their daily direct hits on the Morro to 500. Velasco was losing as many as 30 men each day, and the workload of repairing the fortress every night was so exhausting that men had to be rotated into the fort from the city every three days. Velasco finally managed to convince Prado that a raid was necessary against the British batteries. At dawn on 29 June 988 men (a mixed company of grenadiers, marines, engineers, and slaves) attacked the siege works. They reached the British batteries from the rear and started to spike guns, but British reaction was swift, and the attackers were repulsed before they caused any serious damage.

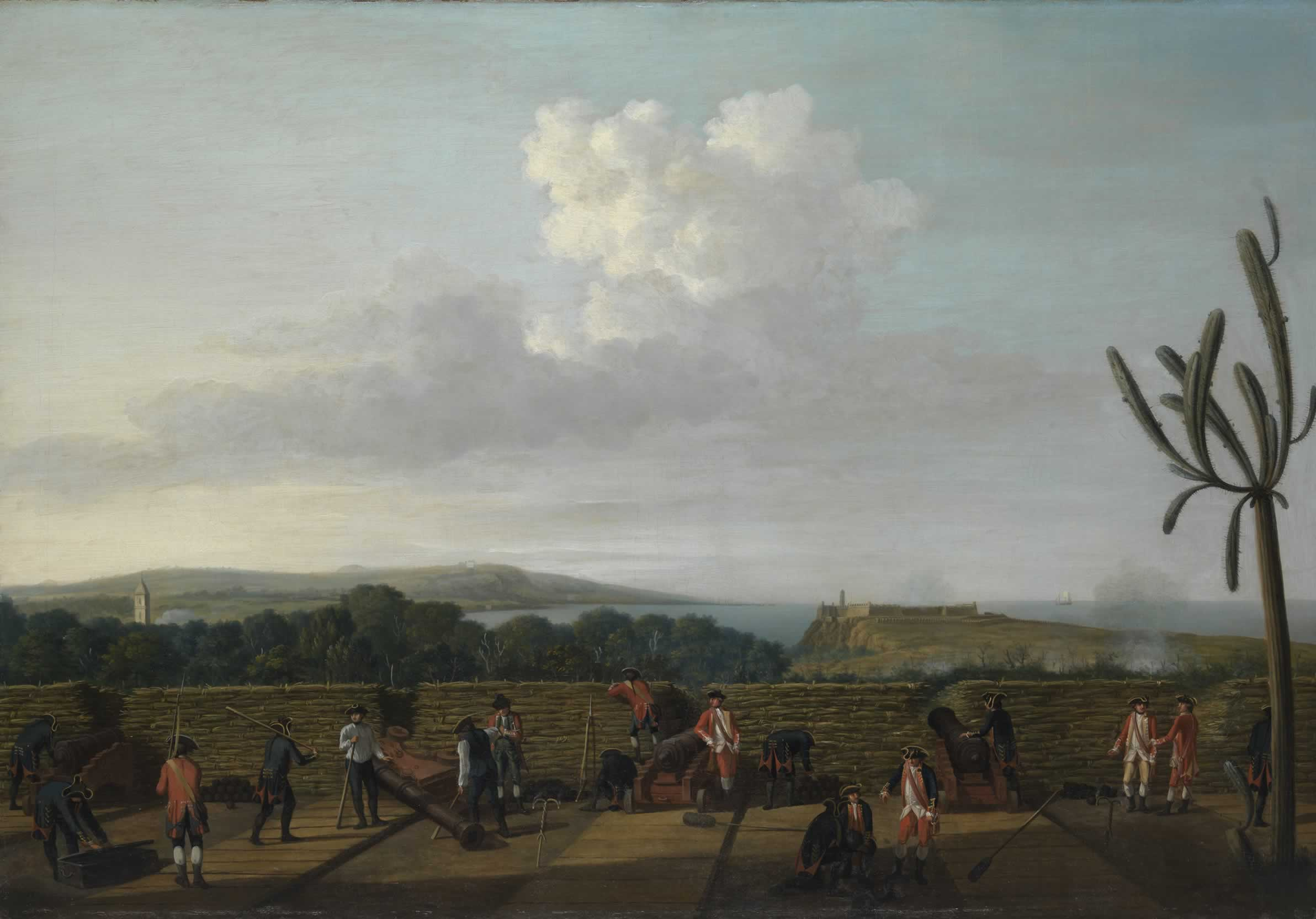
British siege guns before Morro Castle, by Dominic Serres

On 1 July, the British launched a combined land and naval attack on the Morro. The fleet detached four ships of the line for this purpose: HMS Stirling Castle, HMS Dragon, HMS Marlborough and HMS Cambridge. The naval and land artillery simultaneously opened fire on the Morro. However, naval guns were ineffective, the fort being located too high. Counter-fire from thirty guns of the Morro inflicted 192 casualties and seriously damaged the ships, one of which was later scuttled, forcing them to withdraw. Meanwhile, the bombardment by the land artillery was far more effective. By the end of the day, only three Spanish guns were still effective on the side of the Morro facing the British batteries. The next day however British breastworks around the Morro caught fire and the batteries were burned down, destroying the product of much of the work undertaken since mid June. Velasco immediately capitalised on this event, remounting many guns and repairing breaches in the fortifications of the Morro.

Since its arrival at Havana, the British army had heavily suffered from malaria and yellow fever and was now at half strength. Since the hurricane season was approaching, Albemarle was now engaged in a race against time. He ordered the batteries to be rebuilt with the help of men of the fleet. Many 32-pounder guns were taken from the lower deck of several ships to equip these new batteries.

By 17 July the new British batteries had progressively silenced most of Velasco's guns, leaving only two of them operational. With the absence of artillery cover, it now became impossible for the Spanish troops to repair the damage being inflicted on the Morro. Mackellar was also able to resume construction of siege works to approach the fortress. With the army in such a bad condition, work progressed rather slowly. All hope of the British army now resided in the expected arrival of reinforcements from North America.

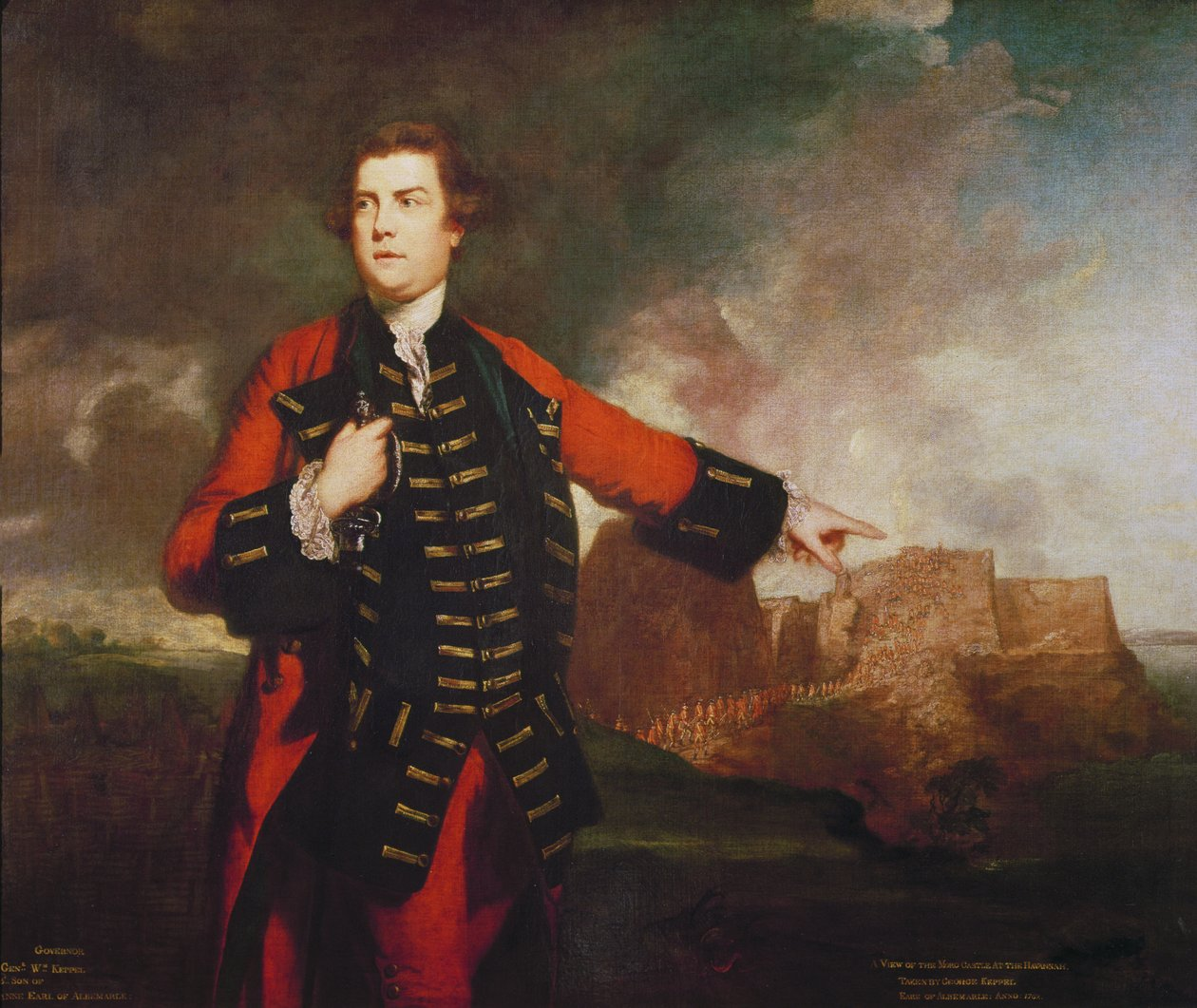
General William Keppel, Storming the Morro Castle, by Joshua Reynolds

The progress of siege works over the next few days allowed the British to begin the mining towards the right bastion of the Morro. Meanwhile, the now unopposed British artillery was daily hitting the Morro up to 600 times, causing some sixty casualties. Velasco had now no hope but to destroy British siege works and so on 22 July 1,300 regulars, seamen and militia sallied from Havana in three columns and attacked the siege works surrounding the Morro. The British repelled the Spanish sortie who thus withdrew to their lines and the siege works were left relatively intact.

On 24 July Albemarle offered Velasco the opportunity to surrender, allowing him to write his own terms of capitulation. Velasco answered that the issue would rather be settled by force of arms. Three days later the reinforcements from North America led by Colonel Burton finally arrived. These reinforcements, who had been attacked by the French during their journey, with the loss through capture of some 500 men, consisted of:

- 46th Thomas Murray's Regiment of Foot
- 58th Anstruther's Regiment of Foot
- American provincials (3,000 men)
- Gorham's and Danks' Rangers – which were combined into a 253-man ranger corps.

By 25 July 5, 000 soldiers and 3,000 sailors were sick.

On 29 July the mine near the right bastion of the Morro fort was completed and ready to explode. Albemarle vainly feigned an assault, hoping that Velasco would finally decide to surrender. On the contrary, Velasco decided to launch a desperate attack from the sea upon the British miners in the ditch. At 2:00 am the next day two Spanish schooners attacked the miners from the sea. Their attack was unsuccessful and they had to withdraw. At 1:00 pm the British finally detonated the mine. The debris of the explosion partly filled the ditch but Albemarle judged it passable, and launched an assault, sending 699 picked men against the right bastion. Before the Spanish could react, sixteen men gained a foothold on the bastion. Velasco rushed to the breach with his troops, and was mortally wounded during the ensuing hand-to-hand fighting. The Spanish troops fell back, leaving the British in control of the Morro fort. Velasco was transported back to Havana, but by 31 July had died of his wounds.

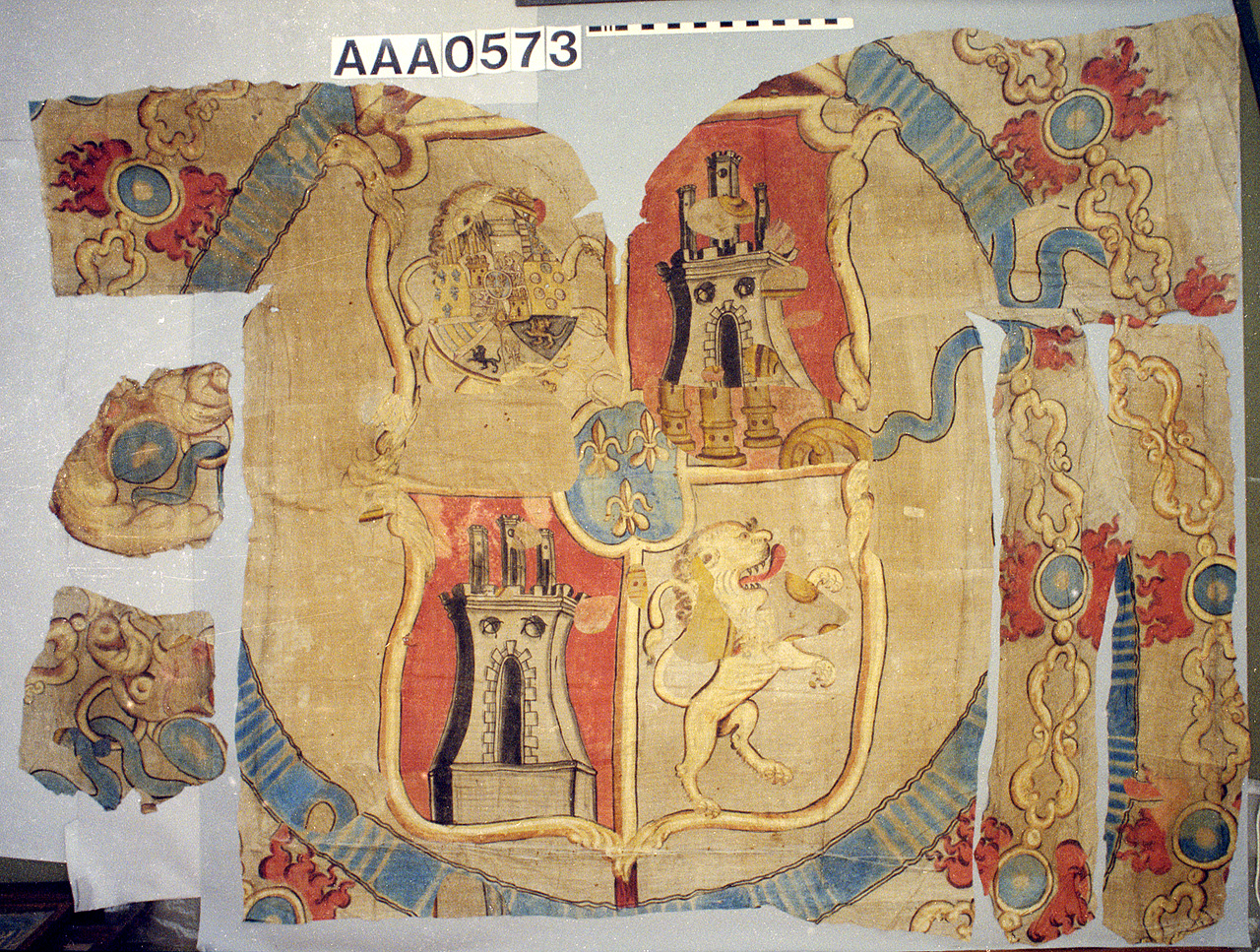
Parts of a patched Spanish flag captured during the assault on Moro Castle, showing arms of Castille and Leon with Bourbon arms in centre surrounded by Order of the Golden Fleece (from Royal Museums Greenwich)

The British then occupied a position commanding the city of Havana as well as the bay. Artillery batteries were brought up along the north side of the entrance channel from the Morro fort to La Cabaña hill, where they could be trained directly on the town.

=== Surrender ===
On 11 August, after Prado had rejected the demand for surrender sent to him by Albemarle, the British batteries opened fire on Havana. A total of 47 guns (15 × 32-pdrs, 32 × 24-pdrs), 10 mortars and 5 howitzers pounded the city from a distance of 500–800 m. By the end of the day Fort la Punta was silenced. Prado had no other choice left but to surrender.

The next day, Prado was informed that there was only sufficient ammunition for a few more days. He made belated plans to remove the bullion in Havana to another part of the island, but the city was surrounded. Negotiations of the articles of capitulation of the city and the fleet went on, and Prado and his army obtained the honours of war on 13 August. Hevia neglected to burn his fleet which fell intact in the hands of the British.

The great losses of men in the attack on Havana put to an end any possibility of an attack on Louisiana, and the French took advantage of the removal of so many troops from Canada to capture Newfoundland with a small force of fifteen hundred troops. Newfoundland was recaptured in the Battle of Signal Hill on 15 September 1762.

== Aftermath ==
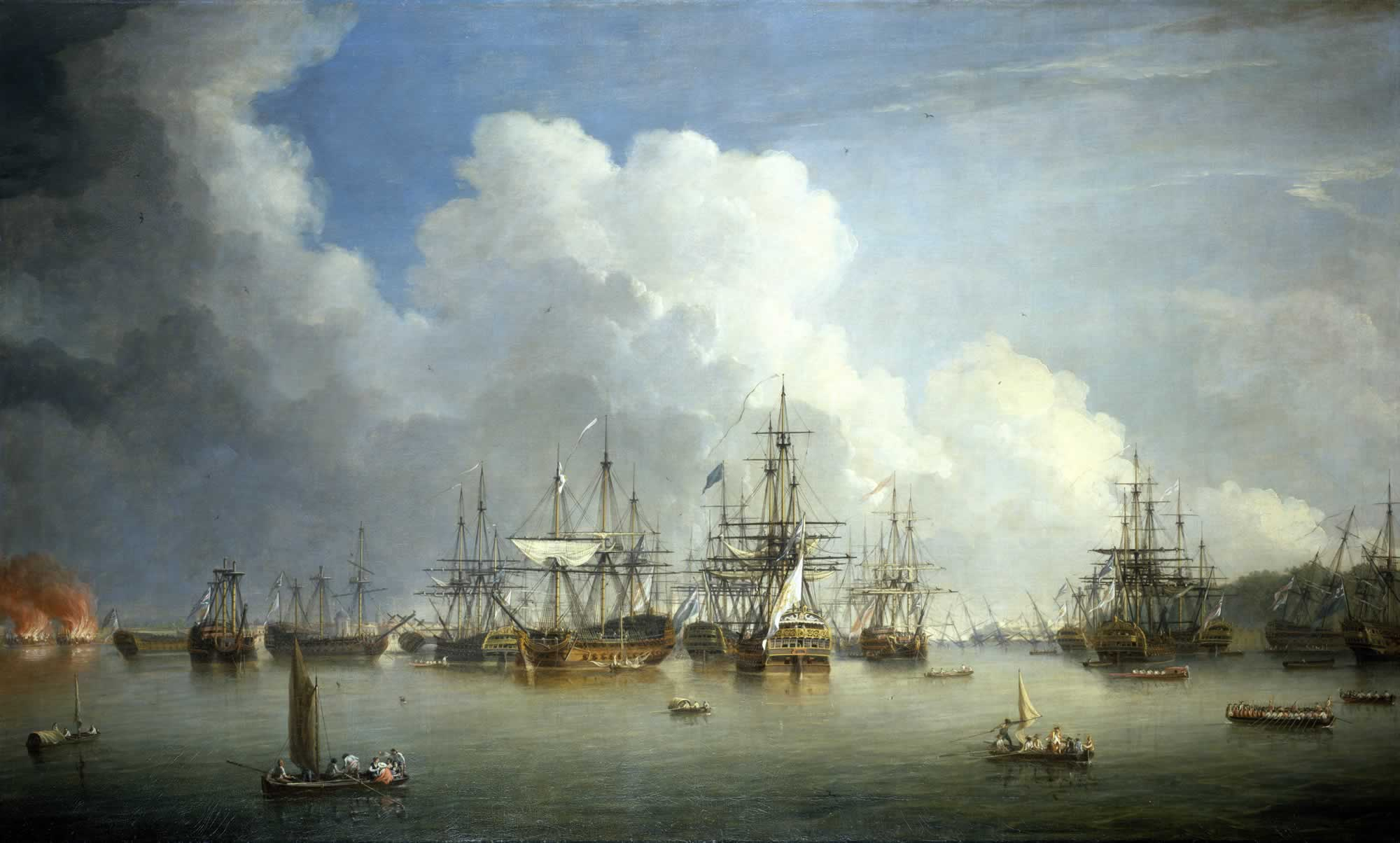
The Captured Spanish Fleet at Havana

British forces entered Havana on 14 August, having captured the Spanish West Indies' most valuable harbour along with military equipment worth 1,828,116 Spanish pesos and goods valued at 1,000,000 pesos. They also took possession of nine ships of the line which the defenders had failed to scuttle: Infante (70), Reina (70), Soberano (70), Tigre (70), Aquilón (68), San Antonio (64), América (60), Conquistador (60) and San Genaro (60), which comprised almost 20% of the Spanish navy's ships of the line. The British also captured several warships of the Royal Company of Havana and Guipuzcoan Company of Caracas, including a 78-gun ship of the line of the former, along with nearly 100 merchantmen. San Carlos and Santiago, two almost-completed 80-gun ships of the line in the Havana dockyard, were burnt, and two corvettes (one of which was the 18-gun Maite under Domingo de Bonechea), two 18-gun sloops and several smaller warships were captured either in Havana's harbour or along the Cuban coast.

After the capture of Havana, prize money payments of £122,697 each were made to Albemarle and Pocock, with Augustus Keppel, the second highest-ranking British naval officer at the siege and Albemarle's younger brother, being paid £24,539. All of the 42 Royal Navy captains present at the siege were paid £1,600. George Eliott, Albemarle's second-in-command, received the same amount as Keppel as the two shared 15% of the prize money against the 33% shared by their commanders. Elliot bought Bayley Park in East Sussex with his prize money, altering and enlarging it. British privates were paid just over £4 and ratings less than £4. British forces had suffered 2,764 casualties during the siege, but by 18 October had lost 4,708 men to disease. One of the most depleted British units was sent to North America, where it lost a further 360 men with a month of arriving. Three British ships of the line, HMS Stirling Castle, HMS Marlborough and HMS Temple, were ultimately lost after the siege due to damage sustained from Spanish gunfire. Shortly after the siege, Stirling Castle was declared unserviceable and stripped and scuttled. Marlborough and Temple both sank while returning to England for repairs due to damage received during the siege.

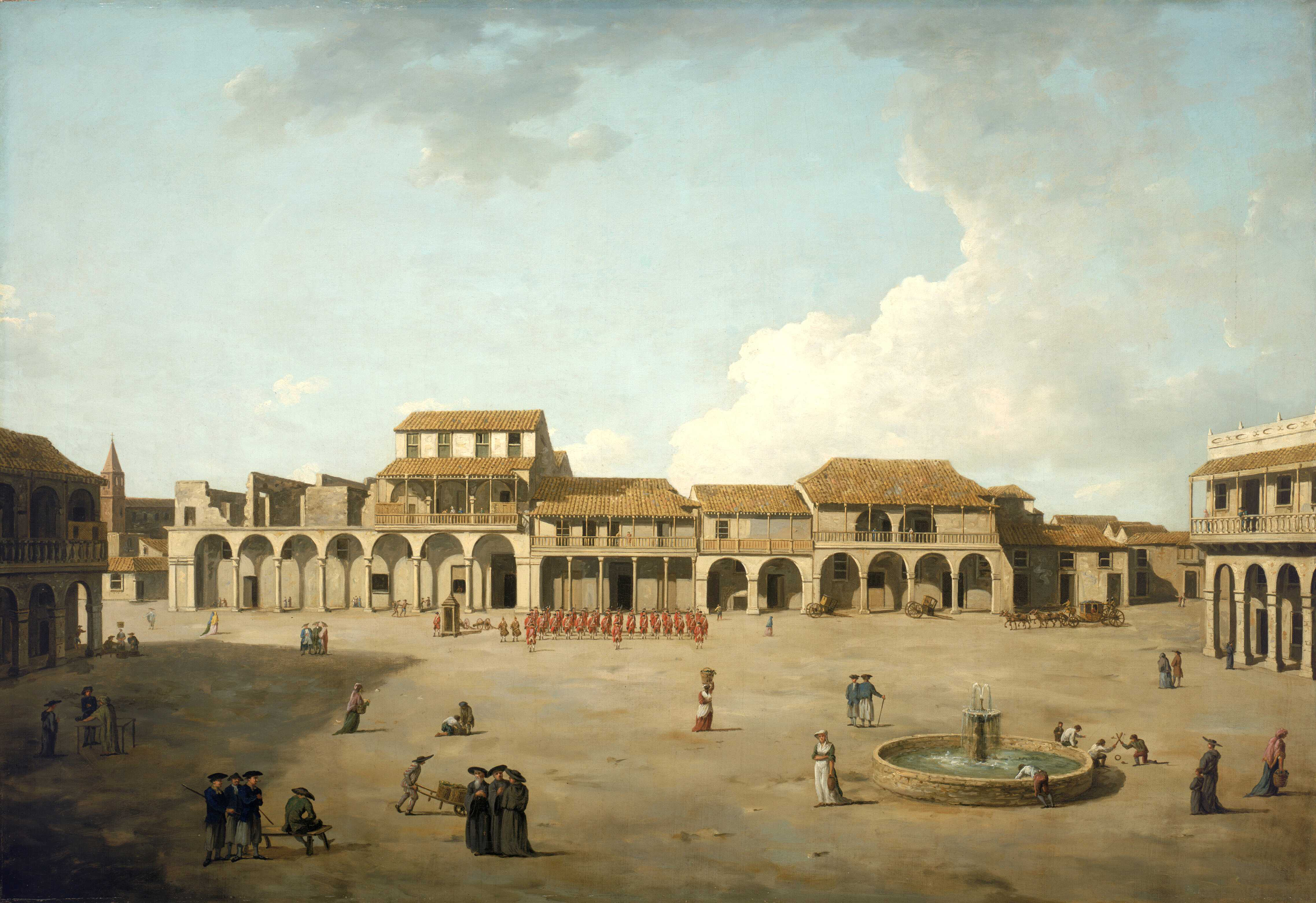
The Piazza at Havana, depicting British occupational troops at the Plaza Vieja

Charles III appointed a commission of generals to try de Prado and the garrison's other senior commanders after they returned to Spain. De Prado, de Hevia and nine other military and civil officials were tried by the commission, which placed most of the blame for the Spanish defeat on de Prado and de Hevia. The pair were criticised for failing to properly fortify the Cabaña hill and abandoning it too easily, crippling de Hevia's fleet by sinking blockships that prevented the remained from being used against the British, surrendering the fleet rather than scuttling it, not mounting any significant counterattacks and finally not sending the city treasure away from Havana before capitulating. After a lengthy trial, de Prado was found guilty of treason and sentenced to death, but was reprieved and died in prison. De Hevia was sentenced to house arrest for a decade and the loss of his office and titles, but was later pardoned and reinstated. Charles III also ennobled Velasco's family and decreed that there should always be a Spanish warship named Velasco.

The loss of Havana was a serious humiliation for the Spanish, which was compounded when British forces captured Manila in the Philippines on 6 October, resulting in Spain losing its colonial capitals in both the Americas and Asia. Just as the earlier War of Jenkins' Ear had forced Britain to undergo a thorough review of its military, the Seven Years' War led Spain to undertake a similar process. The losses of Havana and Manila were the catalyst for a series of far-reaching political and military reforms in the Spanish Empire. Spanish authorities in Cuba expanded the colonial militia to 7,500 men, who were divided into eight infantry battalions and two cavalry regiments, and improved the quality of their weapons, training and uniforms. Havana and Manila were returned to Spain under the terms of the 1763 Treaty of Paris, with the British handing over Havana to Alejandro O'Reilly in April 1763. Spain's acknowledgement of Florida and the Mosquito Coast as British territories heightened Cuba's value as the first line of defence from outside attacks. The Spanish also received Louisiana from France as compensation for ceding Florida.

Over the course of the ten-month period of occupation, the British greatly expanded the number of slaves in Havana, adding about 3200 enslaved Africans to a pre-existing slave population of about 4000. They further abolished a number of Spanish taxes. The increase in slavery coupled with free trade reforms boosted the sugar industry. This had lasting effects to such a degree that, in the words of Ada Ferrer, "the British occupation of Havana is often accorded enormous importance in Cuban history".

== Gallery ==
Numerous paintings and drawings of the battle were made, notably by Dominic Serres:

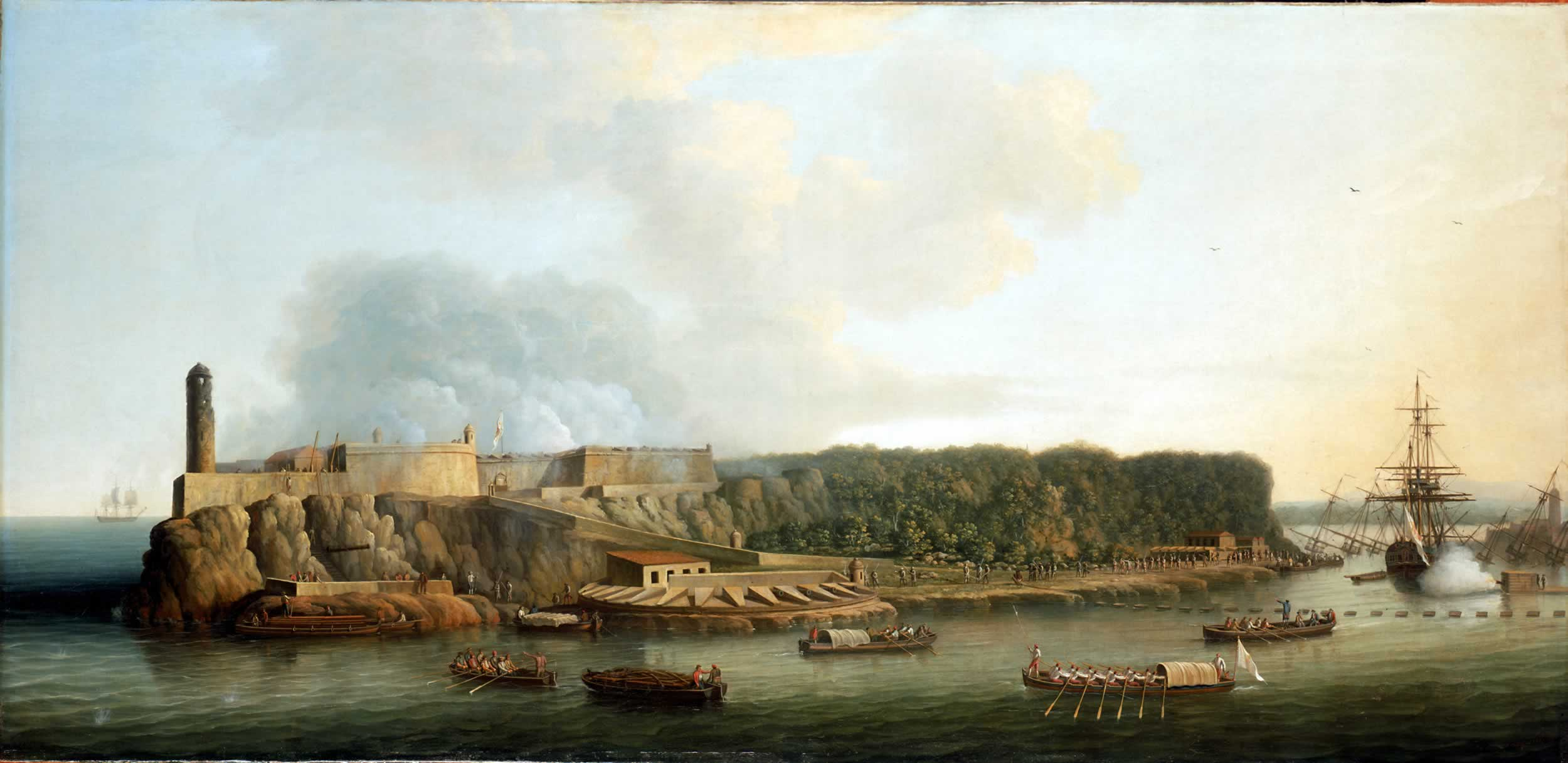
The Morro Castle and the Boom Defence Before the Attack

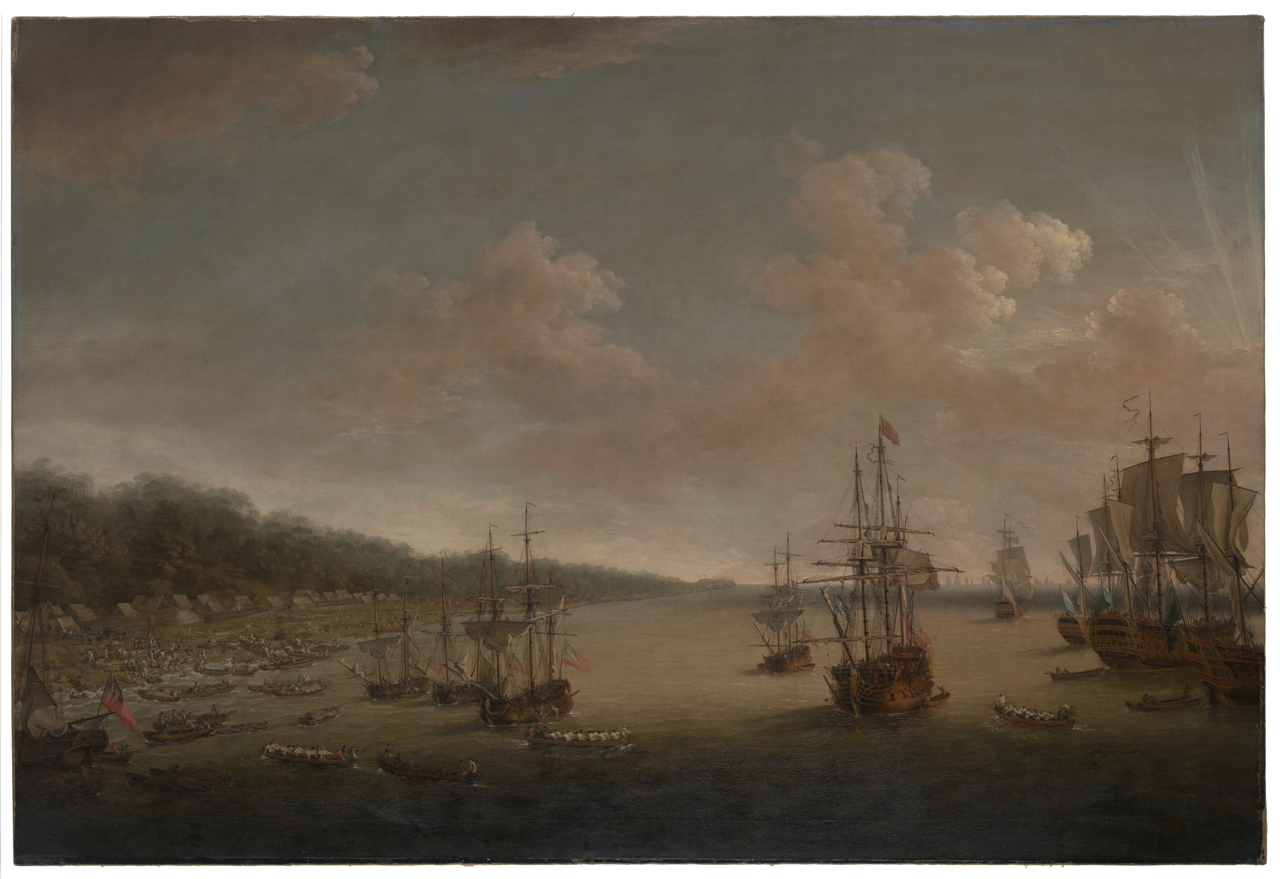
The Landing, 7 June

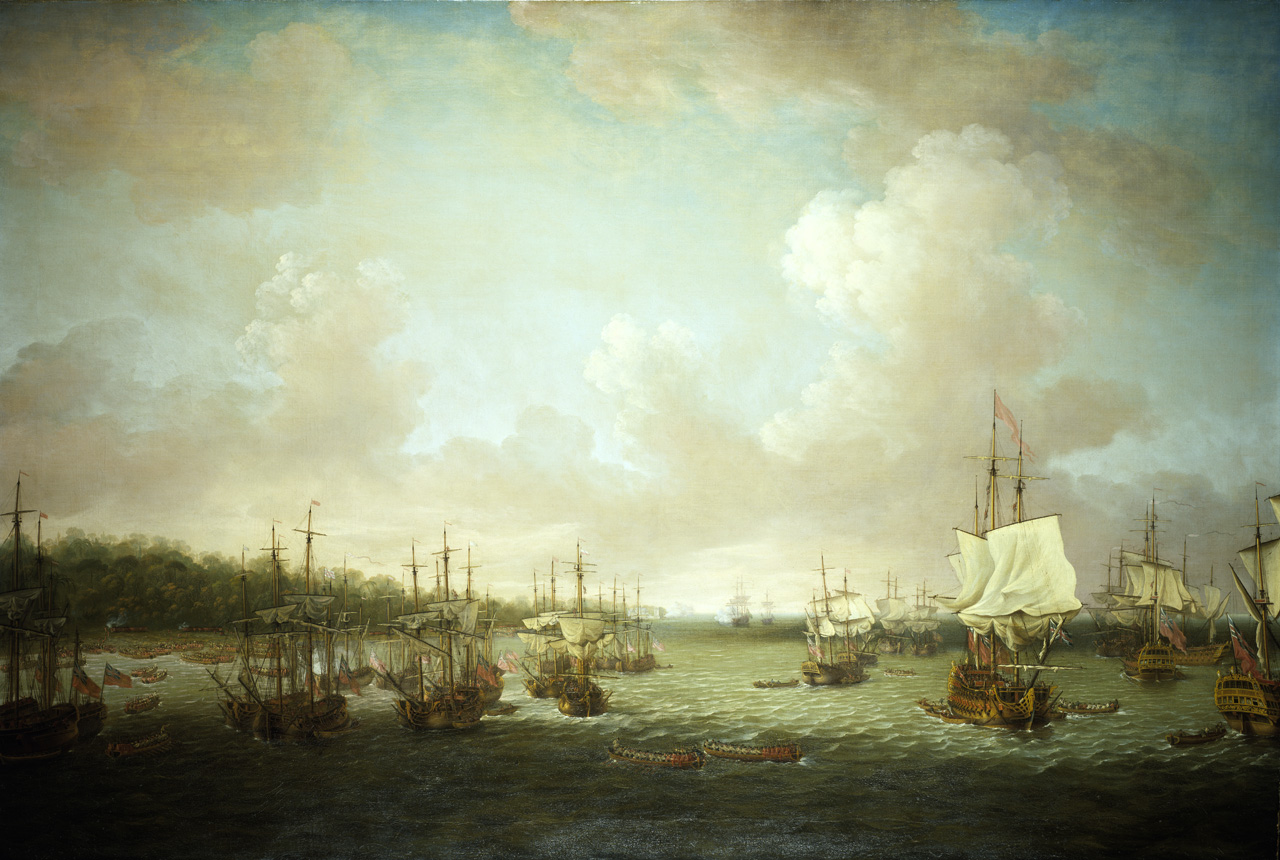
Landing Cannon and Stores, 30 June

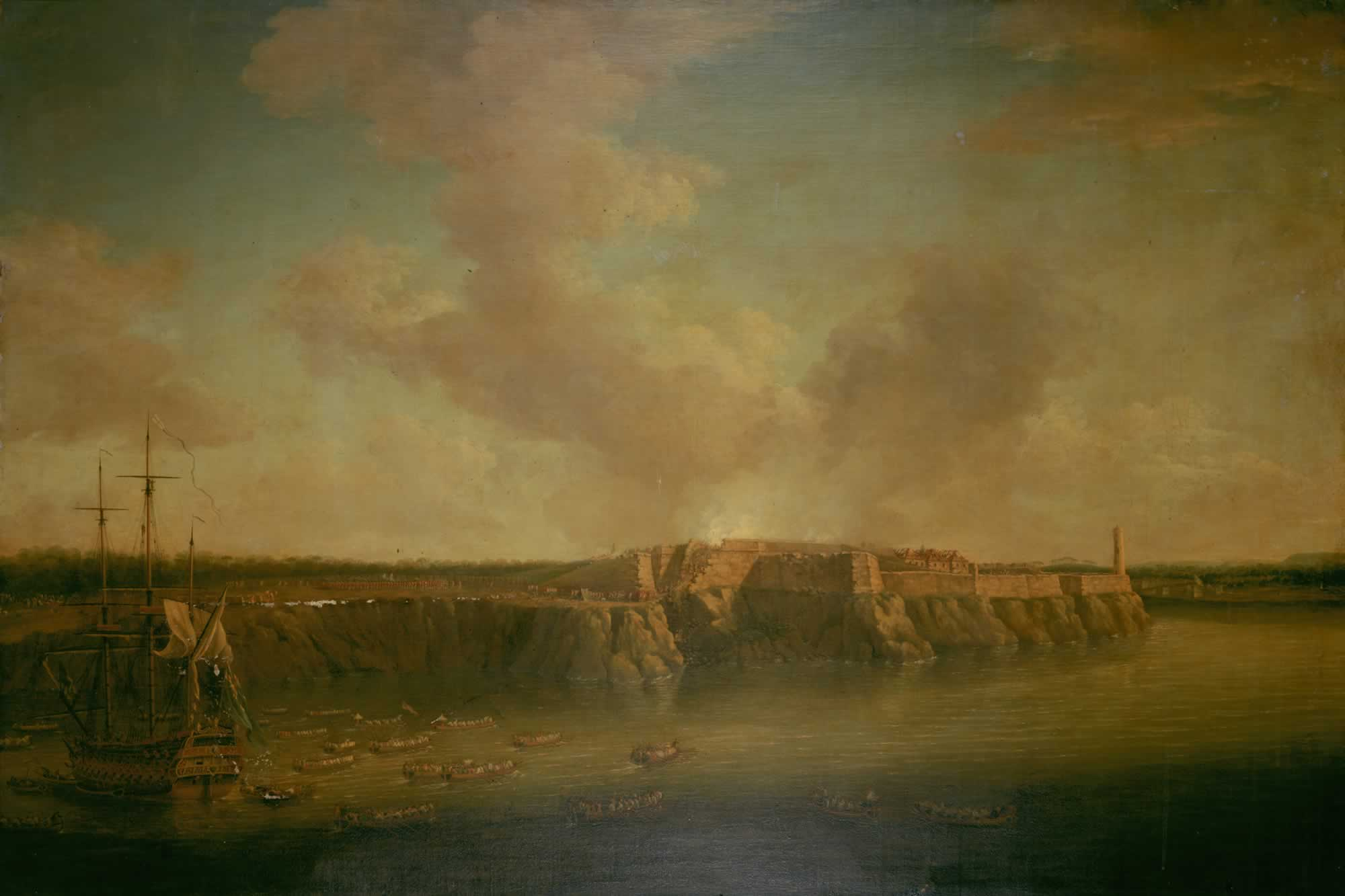
Approach of British forces before Morro Castle

Storming of Morro Castle, 30 July

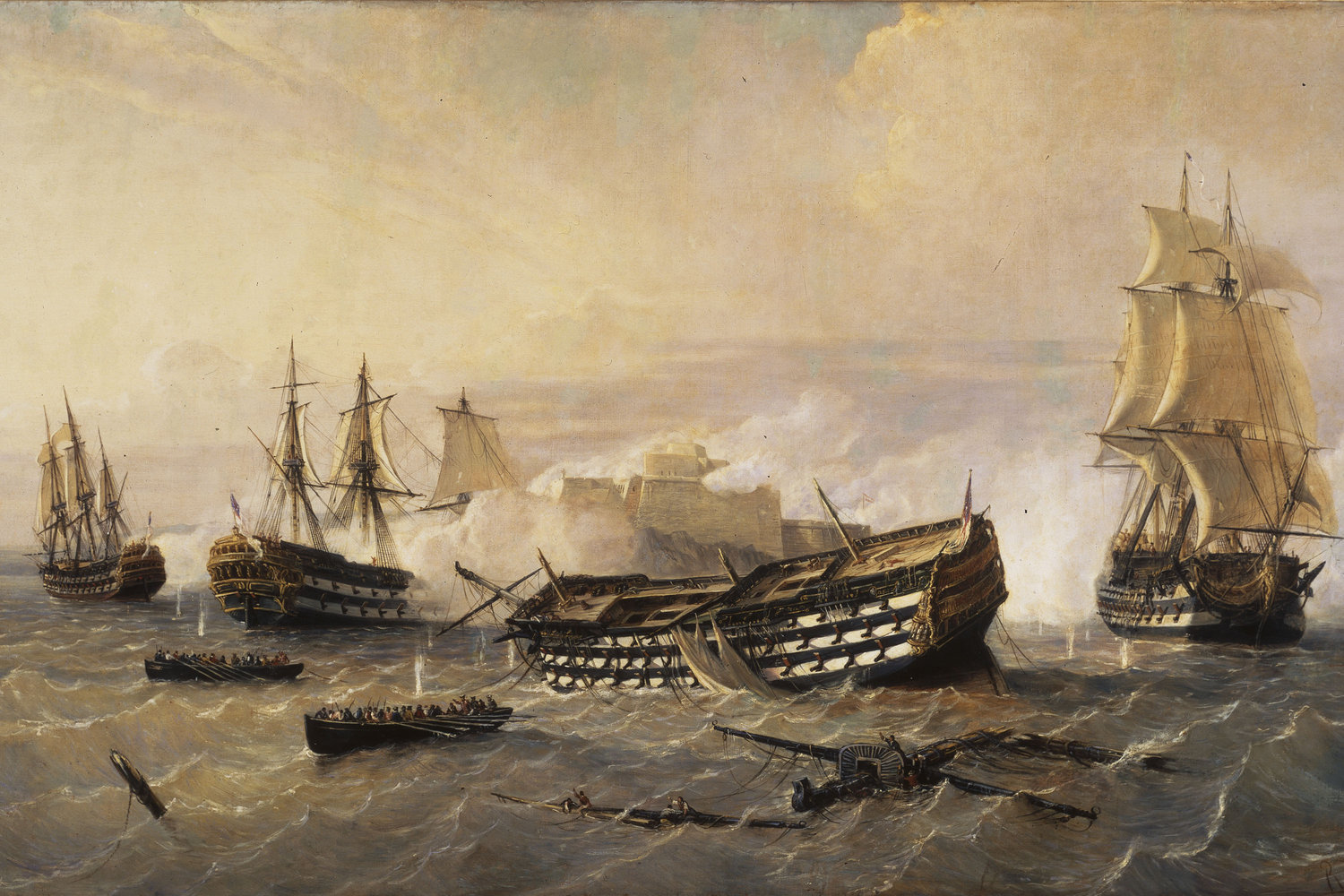
Bombardment of the Morro Castle (Rafael Monleón)

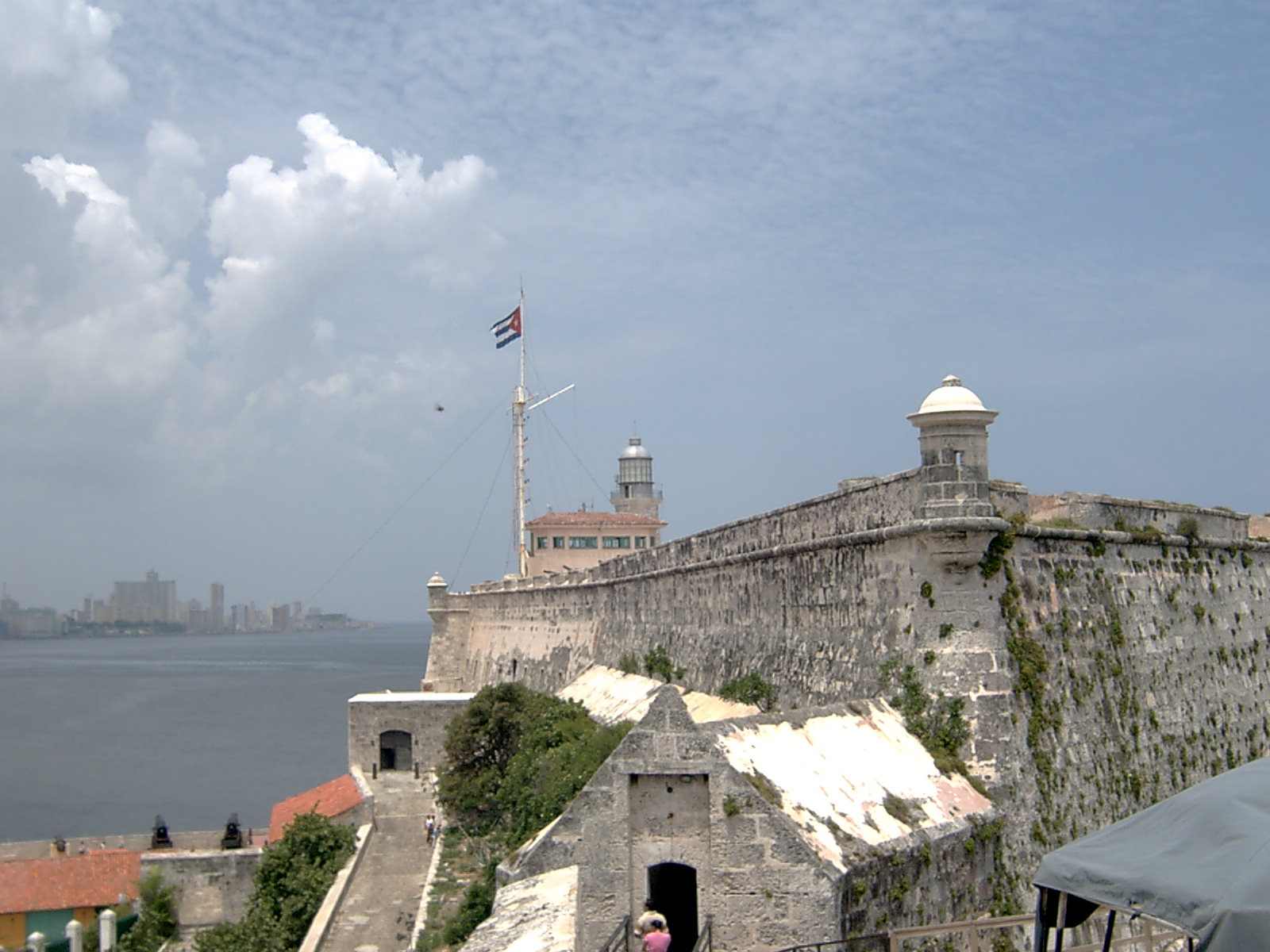
El Morro fortress in Havana, built in 1589

== See also ==
- Great Britain in the Seven Years War
- British occupation of Manila
