= Spanish ship Velasco =

Various Spanish Navy ships

Four ships of the Spanish Navy have borne the name Velasco, after the Spanish naval commander Luis Vicente de Velasco (1711–1762):

- Velasco, a sidewheel paddle steamer acquired in 1850 for use as a troopship and government mail steamer and decommissioned in 1868.
- Velasco, a Velasco-class unprotected cruiser commissioned in 1882 and sunk in the Battle of Manila Bay in 1898.
- Velasco, an Alsedo-class destroyer commissioned in 1924 and stricken in 1957.
- Velasco (L-11), formerly USS Terrebonne Parish (LST-1156), a Terrebonne Parish-class tank landing ship acquired in 1971 and scrapped in 1994.

== See also ==
- Italian cruiser Aquila, transferred to Spain as Melilla in 1937 but referred to officially as Velasco Melilla from 1937 to 1939.
- Italian cruiser Falco, transferred to Spain as Ceuta in 1937 but referred to officially as Velasco Ceuta from 1937 to 1939.
