= George Keppel, 3rd Earl of Albemarle =

British army officer and politician (1724–1772)

General The Right Honourable The Earl of Albemarle KG PC
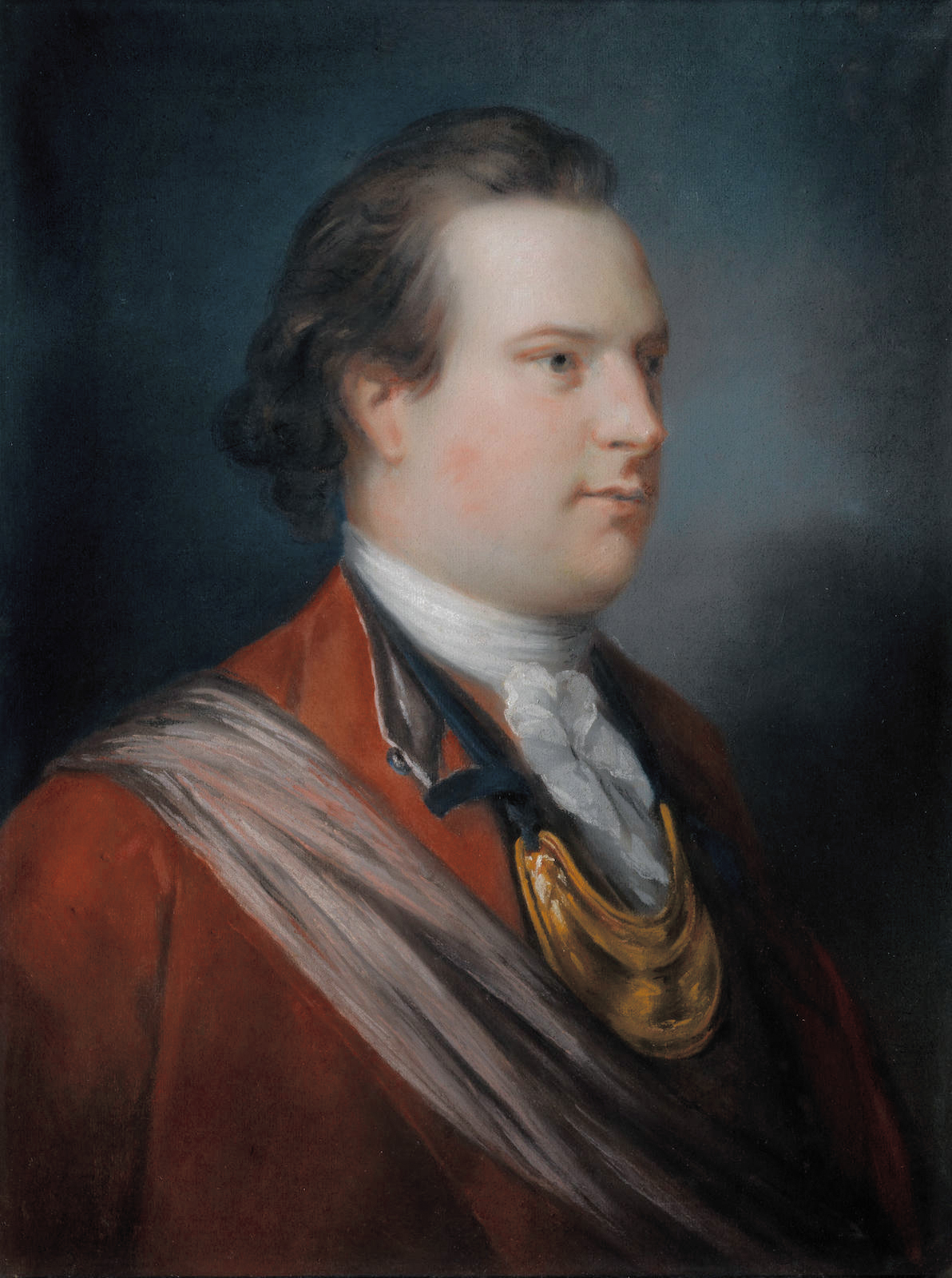
- Portrait by Francis Cotes, 1755
- Born: 8 April 1724; London, England
- Died: 13 October 1772 (aged 48) London, England
- Allegiance: Dutch Republic; Great Britain
- Branch: Dutch States Army; British Army
- Service years: 1738–1772
- Rank: General (Great Britain)
- Commands: 3rd (The King's Own) Regiment of Dragoons
- Conflicts: War of the Austrian Succession; Battle of Fontenoy; Jacobite rising of 1745; Battle of Culloden; Seven Years' War; Siege of Havana
- Spouse: Anne Miller

General George Keppel, 3rd Earl of Albemarle, KG, CB (8 April 1724 – 13 October 1772), styled Viscount Bury until 1754, was a British army officer and politician who served in the War of the Austrian Succession, Jacobite rising of 1745 and Seven Years' War. He is best known for his victory over the Spanish during the siege of Havana in 1762.

== Early life ==
He came from a wealthy and powerful Dutch family from Guelders who had close connections to the Princes of Orange that had moved to England in the seventeenth century, in the aftermath of the Glorious Revolution. His father was Willem van Keppel, 2nd Earl of Albemarle. Through his mother, Lady Anne Lennox, he was a great-grandson of King Charles II of England. He started his military career serving in the Dutch States Army fighting against the French, and in 1745, Keppel participated in the Battle of Fontenoy as an aide to Prince William, Duke of Cumberland.

== Military career and death ==
Keppel had been previously in his military life commissioned an ensign in the Coldstream Regiment of Foot Guards in 1738, becoming a captain-lieutenant of the 1st Regiment of Dragoons in 1741, aged 17, and a captain-lieutenant of the Coldstreams on 7 April 1743. Appointed aide-de-camp to Cumberland in February 1745, was promoted to captain and lieutenant colonel on 27 May 1745. The next year, he was promoted to colonel and made aide-de-camp to George II of Great Britain on 24 April 1746. He had fought at the Battle of Culloden with his father and carried the dispatch of Cumberland's success to London.

Bury, later 3rd Earl of Albemarle, was returned as Member of Parliament for Chichester in 1746. He was appointed a Lord of the Bedchamber to Cumberland in 1748, a post he held until the Duke's death in 1765. On 1 November 1749, he was given the colonelcy of the 20th Regiment of Foot. He succeeded to the earldom on the death of his father in 1754; his younger brother Augustus replaced him as MP for Chichester. On 8 April 1755, he became colonel of the 3rd (The King's Own) Regiment of Dragoons. He was promoted major-general on 1 February 1756 and lieutenant-general on 1 April 1759. He was appointed Governor of Jersey on 26 January 1761 and sworn a Privy Counsellor on 28 January.

The Seven Years' War began in 1756 (with significant fighting beginning in America in 1754). Unlike his younger siblings, Albermarle remained largely inactive until the later stages of the war, although its likely he participated with his regiment in the naval descents conducted against the French coast. Albemarle received criticism in his time (from the likes of Walpole) that his meteoric rise in rank had more to do with his connections to the court than to any martial ability. Before the death of King George II and Pitt's resulting fall from power, Albemarle had been passed over for several major commands in the army.

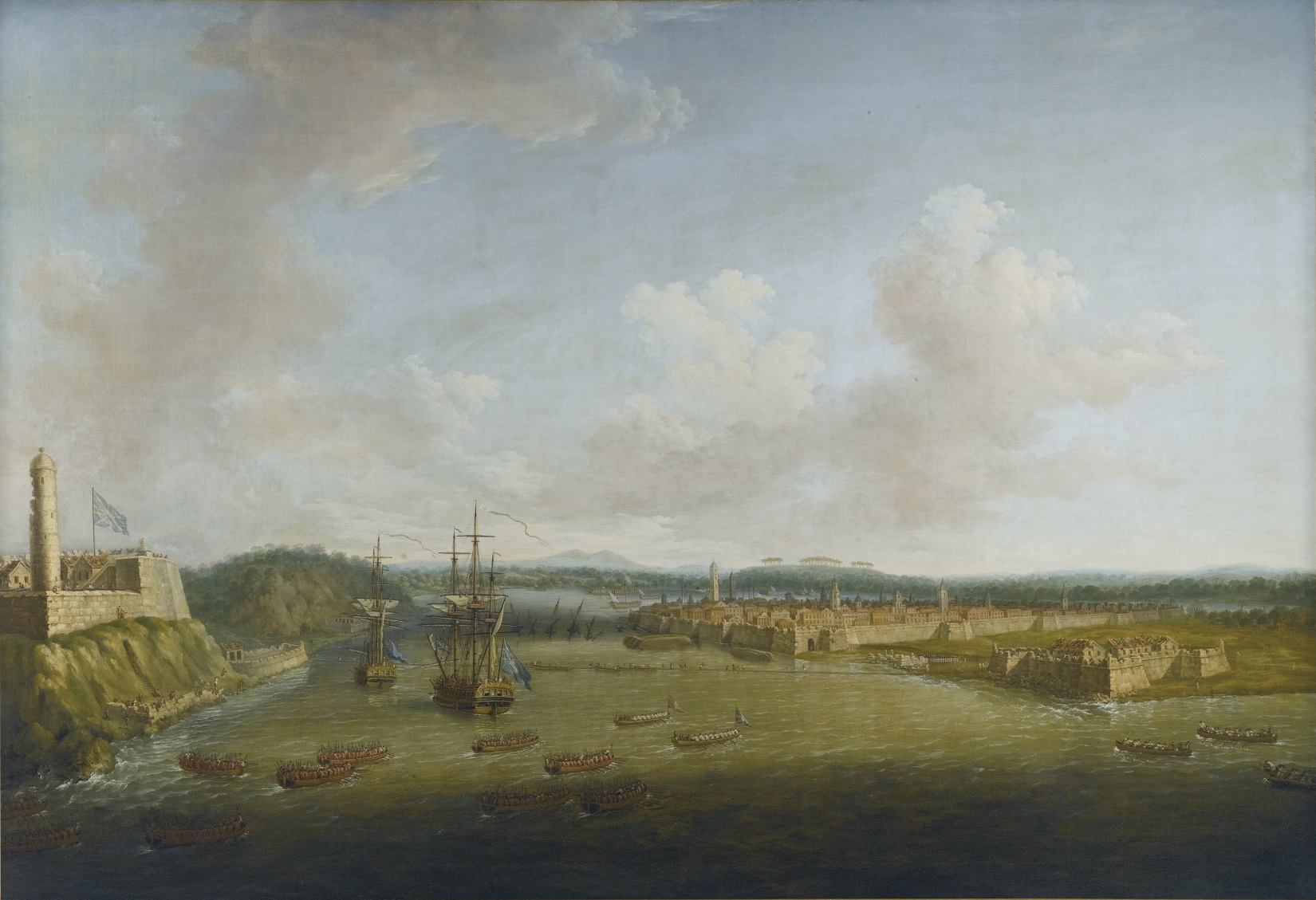
The siege of Havana, at which Albemarle won a decisive victory

In July 1762 with the outbreak of war with Spain and the change of government in Britain (the Earl Bute was now prime minister), Albermarle was finally given a command, the expedition to Cuba; the capital of the Spanish colonial empire. The operational control of the campaign was in reality conducted by Albermarle's more experienced subordinate in the army Colonel George Elliott and the naval commander George Pocock. During the campaign Albemarle made several requests for the Spanish garrison to surrender, offering generous terms of capitulation however the Spanish Governor Prado refused to entertain any thought of capitulation until the final Spanish fortress at la Punta had been silenced and he was left with no choice.

The campaign was extraordinarily successful for its time, given the military strength of the target and the fact that similar such enterprises conducted by Britain in previous decades had ended in disaster. The British force reduced the powerful Spanish fortresses protecting the city and inflicted 11,670 casualties on the Spanish in return for British casualties being under half of that number. However many British soldiers were lost to disease. In addition to the capture of the second capital of the Spanish Empire, 10 ships of the line, 2 frigates, 2 sloops and 100 merchant ships were captured. The humiliating Spanish defeat helped end the war in the favour of the British. For Albemale, the campaign was lucrative. He received more than 122,000 pounds in prize money, enabling him to buy Quidenham Hall in Norfolk, England, which became his family seat. Albermale however fell victim to the tropical ailments that commonly afflicted soldiers and sailors of the era and his health suffered badly from relapses until his death.

== Later life ==
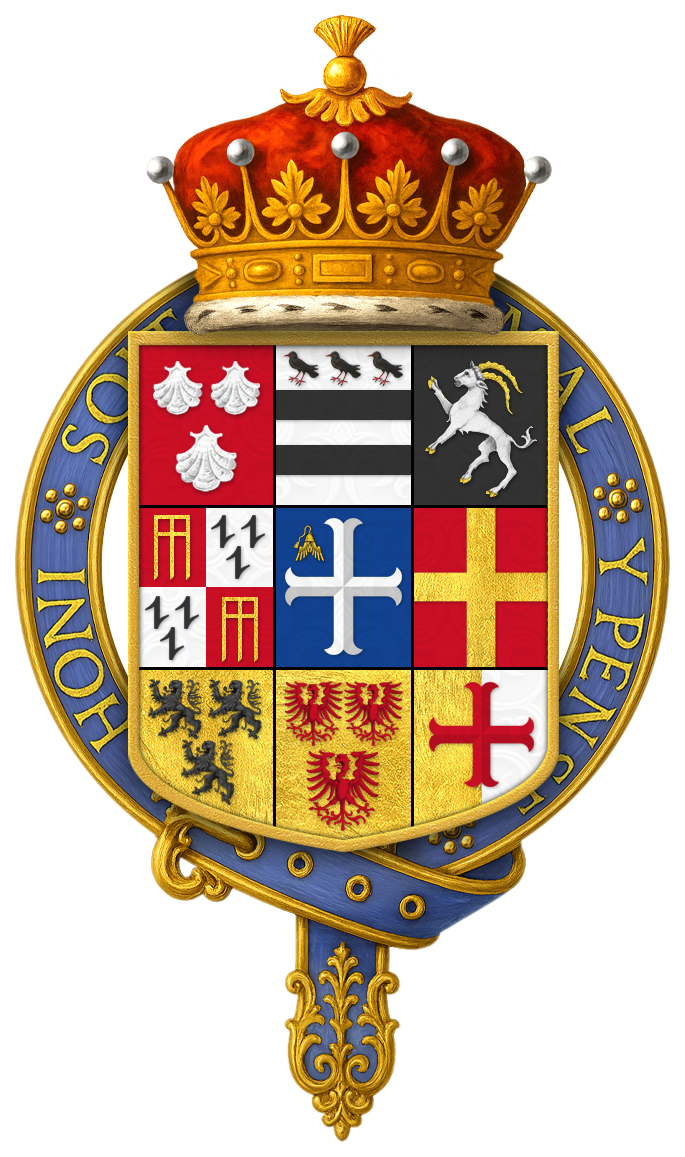
Quartered coat of arms of George Keppel, 3rd Earl of Albemarle, KG, PC

Keppel was made a Knight of the Garter in 1765 and was appointed Keeper of Bagshot Park in 1766. On 20 April 1770 at Bagshot Park, he married Anne Miller (died 3 July 1824), daughter of Sir John Miller, 4th Baronet, by whom he had a son, William Charles (1772–1849).

Politically, he was a prominent member of the Rockingham Whigs in the House of Lords. He was made a general on 26 May 1772, and died in October of that year.

== Legacy ==
Albemarle Street in Halifax, Nova Scotia is named after him.

== Arms ==
Coat of arms of George Keppel, 3rd Earl of Albemarle
Coronet Coronet of an Earl. Crest Out of a ducal coronet or, a swan's head and neck argent. Escutcheon Gules, three escallops argent. Supporters Two lions ducally crowned or. Motto Ne cede malis (Yield not to adversity) Orders The Most Noble Order of the Garter - Knight Companion (KG).

== See also ==
- Great Britain in the Seven Years' War

Parliament of Great Britain
Preceded by James Brudenell; John Page	Member of Parliament for Chichester with John Page; 1746–1754	Succeeded by John Page; Augustus Keppel
Military offices
Preceded by Lord George Sackville	Colonel of the 20th Regiment of Foot; 1749–1755	Succeeded by Philip Honywood
Preceded by The Lord Tyrawley	Colonel of the 3rd (The King's Own) Regiment of Dragoons; 1755–1772	Succeeded by Charles FitzRoy
Peerage of England
Preceded by Willem Keppel	Earl of Albemarle; 1754–1772	Succeeded by William Keppel
