= La Punta =

La Punta, Spanish for "the point" or the promontory and may refer to:

- La Punta, Iloilo, Philippines
- La Punta, San Luis, Argentina
- La Punta District, Peru
- San Giovanni la Punta, Italy
- San Salvador de la Punta Fortress, Cuba

== See also ==
- Punta (disambiguation)
