= Castillo de los Tres Reyes Del Morro =

Fortress in Havana, Cuba

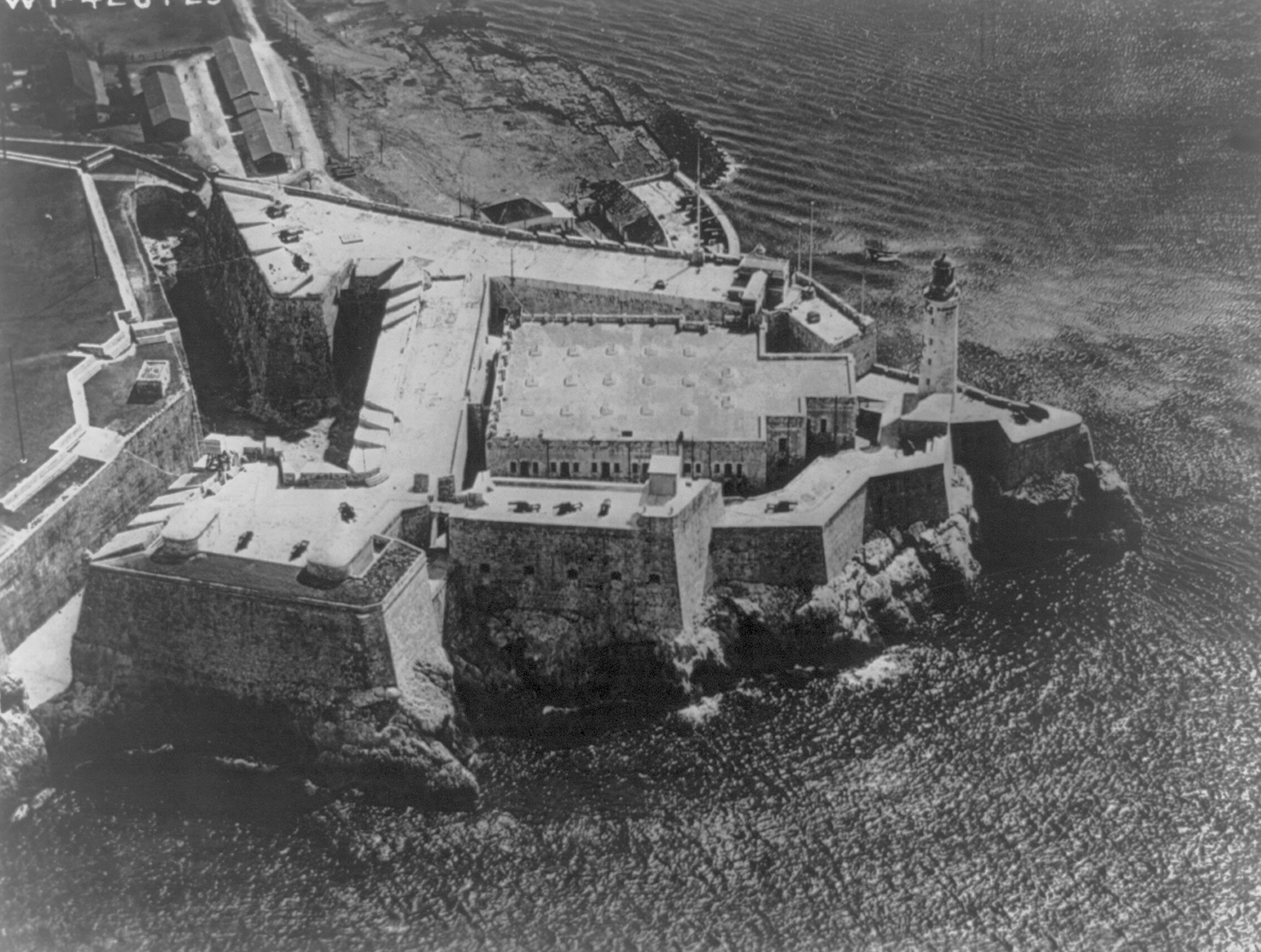
- Aerial view of Castillo de los Tres Reyes del Morro, 1909
- Interactive map of the Castillo de los Tres Reyes Del Morro area

General information
- Location: Havana, Cuba
- Coordinates: 23°09′01.67″N 82°21′23.99″W
- Completed: 1589

Technical details
- Structural system: Load bearing
- Material: Masonry

Design and construction
- Engineer: Battista Antonelli

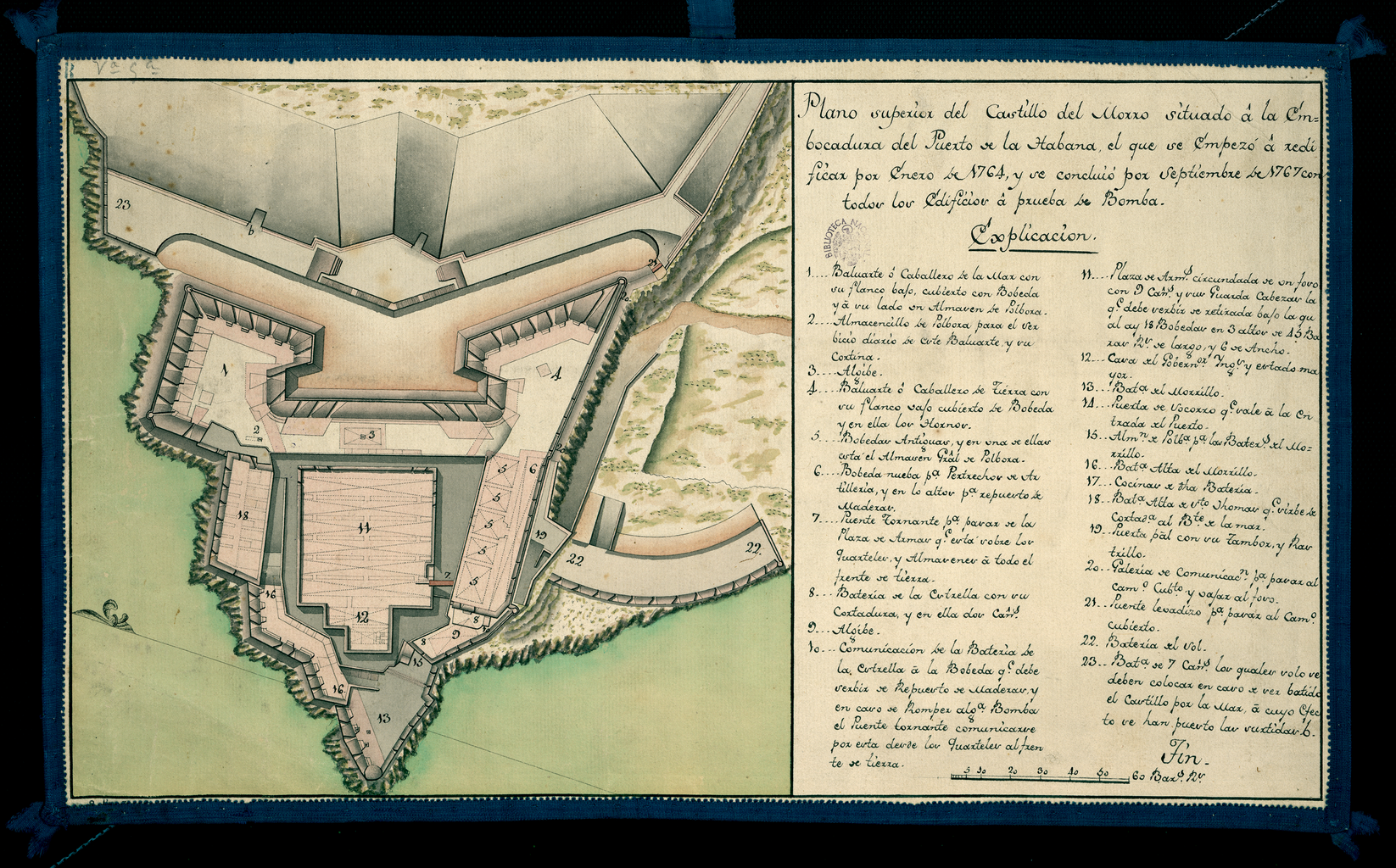
This 18th-century manuscript map shows the plan of Morro Castle, located at the entrance of Havana Bay, Cuba. The fortress was built by the Spaniards, starting in 1585.

The Castillo de los Tres Reyes del Morro (English: "Castle of the Three Kings of Morro"), also known as Castillo del Morro (Morro Castle), is a fortress guarding the entrance to the Havana harbor. The design is by the Italian engineer Battista Antonelli (1547–1616). Originally under the control of Spain, the fortress was captured by the British in 1762 and returned to Spain under the Treaty of Paris (1763) a year later. (Note: "Havana remained under British occupation until February 1763, when it was returned to Spain under the 1763 Treaty of Paris that formally ended the war.") The Morro Castle was the primary defence in the Havana harbor until La Cabaña was completed in 1774.

== History ==
Perched on the promontory on the opposite side of the harbor from Old Havana, it can be seen from miles as it dominates the entrance to the harbor. Built in 1589 in response to raids on the city, el Morro protected the entrance of the harbor with a chain strung out across the water, known as the boom defence to the fort at La Punta. The Morro fortress shares its name with Castillo de San Pedro de la Roca in Santiago de Cuba and the Castillo de San Felipe del Morro in San Juan, Puerto Rico. In this case, the Spanish "morro" means a rock visible from the sea and serves as a navigational landmark. The fortress is part of the Old Havana World Heritage Site, inscribed in 1982 for its historical importance in the European conquest of the New World and its unique mix of architecture.

== Cuba under attack (1500–1800) ==
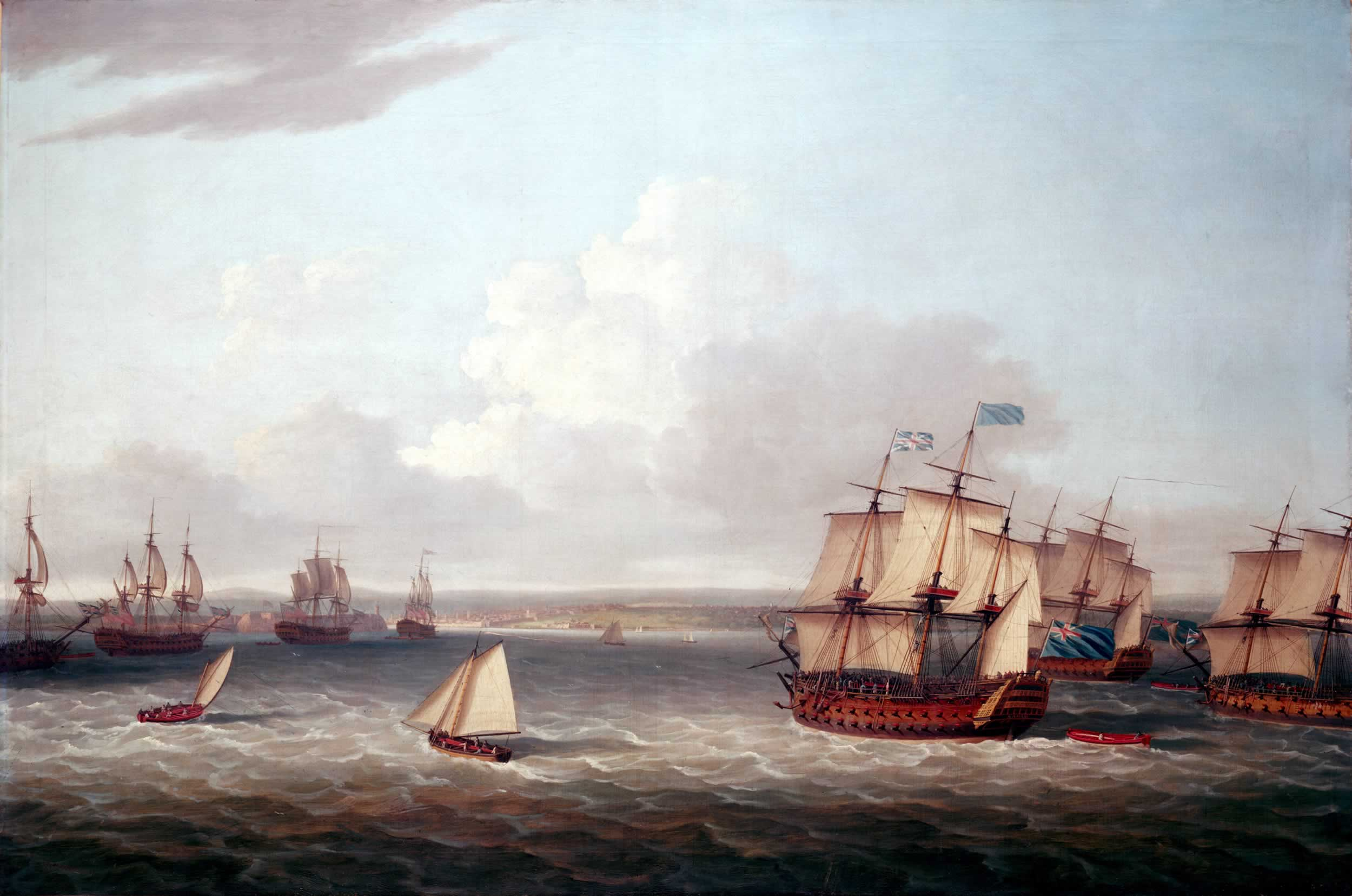
The British Fleet Entering Havana, 21 August 1762, a 1775 painting by Dominic Serres

Colonial Cuba was a frequent target of buccaneers, pirates and French corsairs seeking Spain's New World riches. In response to repeated raids, defences were bolstered throughout the island during the 16th century. In Havana, the fortress of Castillo de los Tres Reyes Magos del Morro was built to deter potential invaders, which included the English privateer Francis Drake, who sailed within sight of Havana harbor but did not disembark on the island. Havana's inability to resist invaders was dramatically exposed in 1628 when a Dutch fleet led by Piet Heyn plundered the Spanish ships in the city's harbor. In 1662, English privateer Christopher Myngs captured and briefly occupied Santiago de Cuba on the eastern part of the island to open up Cuba's protected trade with neighboring Jamaica.

Nearly a century later, the British Royal Navy launched another invasion, capturing Guantánamo Bay in 1741 during the War of Jenkins' Ear with Spain. Edward Vernon, the British admiral who devised the scheme, saw his 4,000 occupying troops capitulate to raids by Spanish troops and, more critically, an epidemic, forcing him to withdraw his fleet to British Jamaica. In the War of the Austrian Succession, the British carried out unsuccessful attacks against Santiago de Cuba in 1741 and again in 1748. Additionally, a skirmish between British and Spanish naval squadrons occurred near Havana in 1748.

The Seven Years' War erupted in 1754 across three continents and eventually arrived in the Spanish Caribbean. Spain's alliance with the French pitched them into direct conflict with the British, and in 1762 a British expedition of five warships and 4,000 troops set out from Portsmouth to capture Cuba. The British arrived on 6 June and, by August, had Havana under siege. When Havana surrendered, the admiral of the British fleet, George Keppel, the 3rd Earl of Albemarle, entered the city as a new colonial governor and took control of the whole western part of the island. The arrival of the British immediately opened up trade with their North American and Caribbean colonies, causing a rapid transformation of Cuban society.

Though Havana, which had become the third-largest city in the Americas, was to enter an era of sustained development and closening ties with North America during this period, the British occupation of the city proved short-lived. Pressure from London sugar merchants fearing a decline in sugar prices forced a series of negotiations with the Spanish over colonial territories. Less than a year after Havana was seized, the Peace of Paris was signed by the three warring powers, ending the Seven Years' War. The treaty gave Britain Florida in exchange for Cuba on France's recommendation to Spain. The French advised that declining the offer could result in Spain losing Mexico and much of the South American mainland to the British. In 1781, General Bernardo de Gálvez, the Spanish governor of Louisiana, reconquered Florida for Spain with Mexican, Puerto Rican, Dominican, and Cuban troops.

== Siege ==
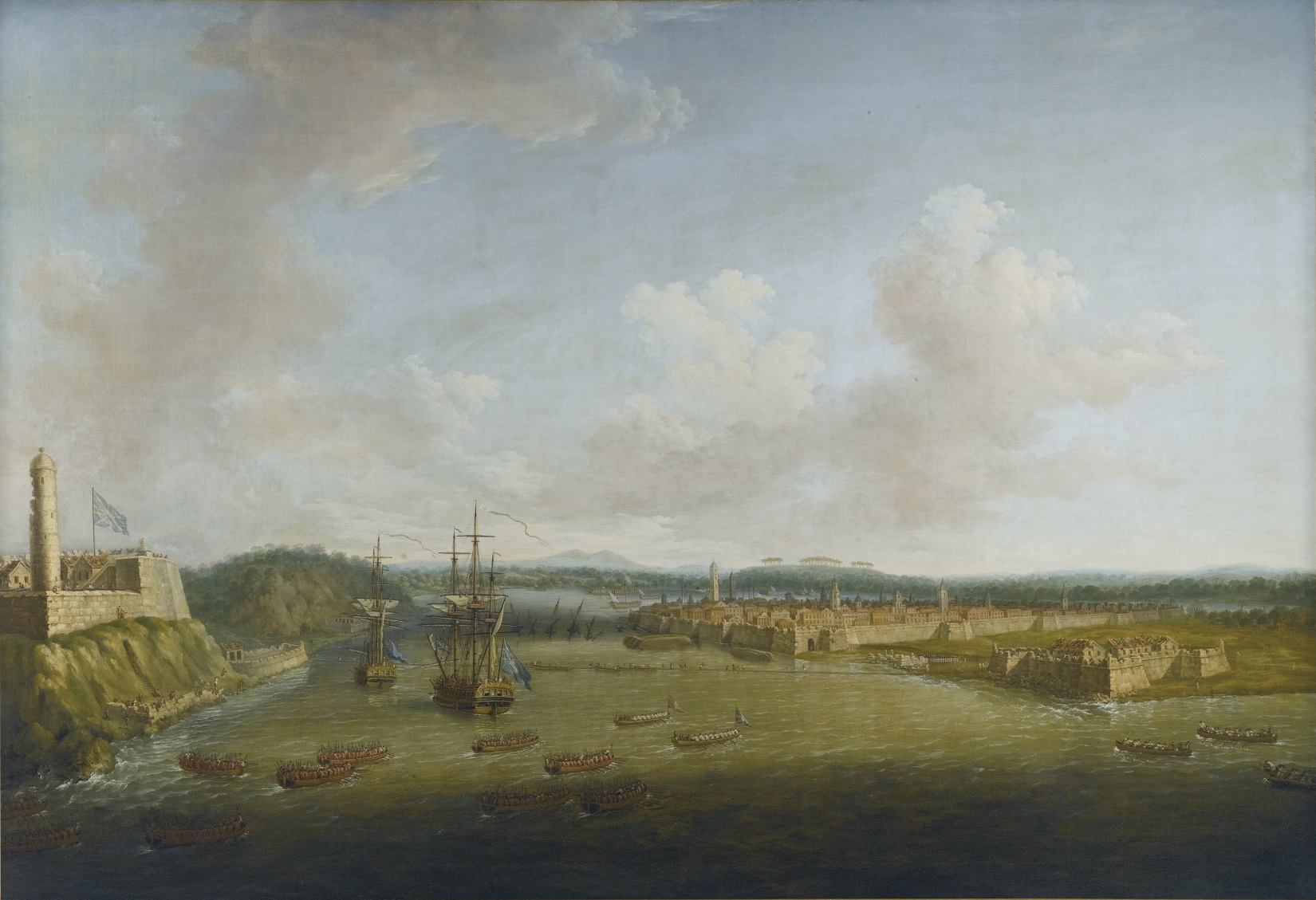
A depiction of an episode from the last major operation of the Seven Years War, 1756-63, by Dominic Serres

The Morro Castle first saw action in 1762 under the command of Luis Vicente de Velasco e Isla. The British expedition against Cuba under Lord Albemarle landed in Cojimar and attacked the fortress from its landward side. The fort fell when the British successfully mined one of its bastions. When the British handed the island back in 1763 to Spain, the fortress at La Cabaña was built to prevent land attacks in the future.

The Siege of Havana was a successful British siege against Spanish-ruled Havana that lasted from March to August 1762 as part of the Seven Years' War. After Spain abandoned its former policy of neutrality by signing the family compact with France, resulting in a British declaration of war on Spain in January 1762, the British government decided to mount an attack on the critical Spanish fortress and naval base of Havana, to weaken the Spanish presence in the Caribbean and improve the security of its own North American colonies. A strong British naval force consisting of squadrons from Britain and the West Indies and the military force of British and American troops it convoyed were able to approach Havana from a direction that neither the Spanish governor nor the Admiral expected and were able to trap the Spanish fleet in the Havana harbour and land its troops with relatively little resistance.

The Spanish authorities decided on a strategy of delaying the British attack until the strength of the city's defences and the onset of seasonal rains inflicting tropical diseases would significantly reduce the size of the British force via disease, along with the start of hurricane season would force the British fleet to seek a safe anchorage. However, the city's main fortress, the Morro Castle, was overlooked by a hill that the governor had neglected to fortify; the British installed batteries there and bombarded the fortress daily with heavy shelling. The fortress eventually fell after the officer in charge of Morro Castle, Luis Vicente de Velasco, was mortally wounded by a stray bullet. The capture of Morro Castle led to the eventual fall of the rest of the fortifications and the surrender of the city, the remaining garrison, and the naval forces present before the hurricane season began.

The surrender of Havana led to substantial rewards for the British naval and military leaders and smaller amounts of prize money for other officers and men. Upon their return to Spain, the Spanish governor, Admiral, and other military and civil officeholders were court-martialled and punished for their failures to conduct a better defence and for allowing the Spanish fleet present to fall intact into the hands of the British. Havana remained under British occupation until February 1763, when it was returned to Spain under the 1763 Treaty of Paris, formally ending the war.

=== Siege of El Morro ===
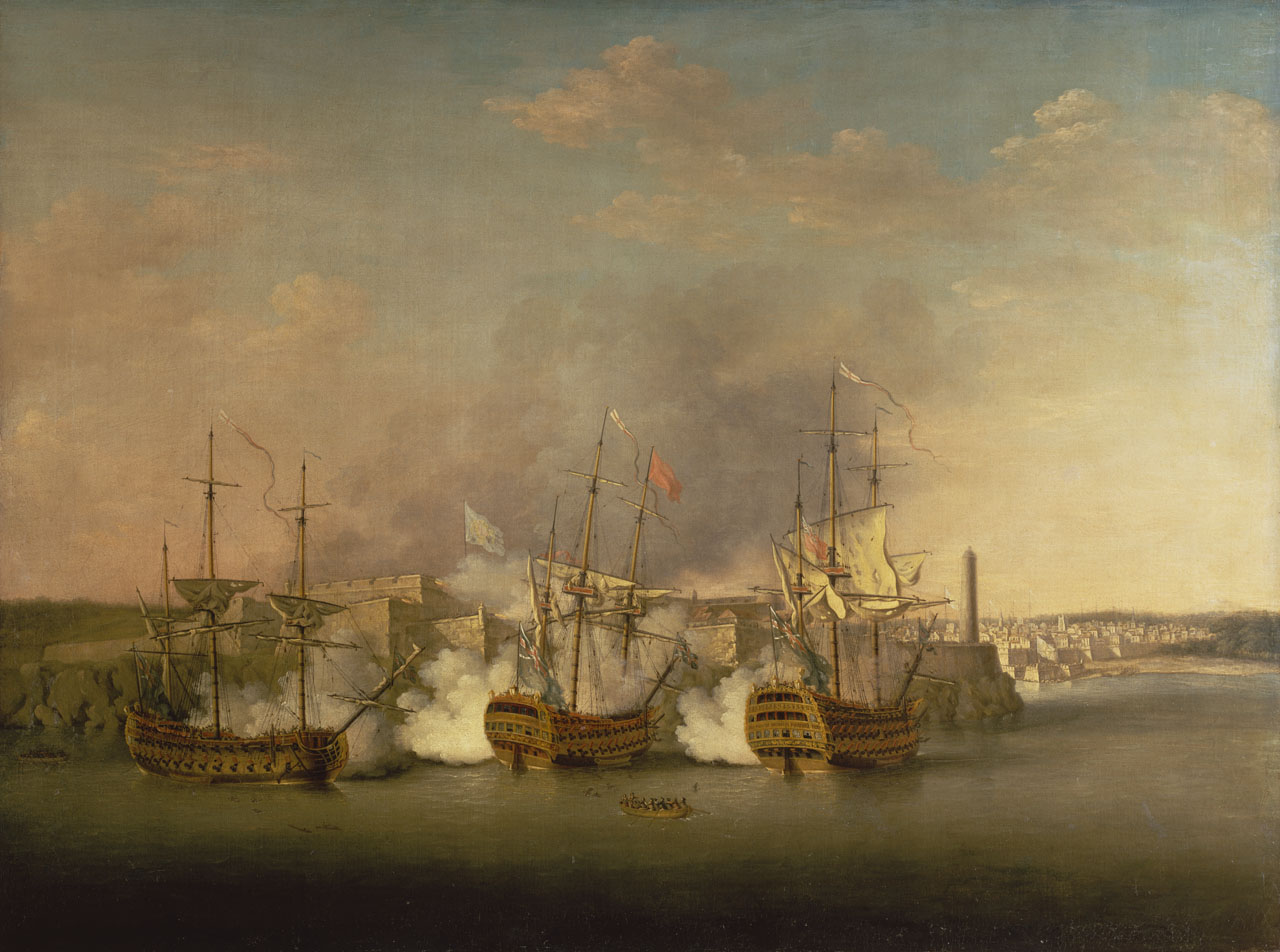
Bombardment of the Morro Castle, Havana, 1 July 1762 by Richard Paton

On 11 June a British party stormed a detached redoubt on the La Cabaña heights. Only then did the British command realize how strong the Morro was, surrounded by brushwood and protected by a large ditch. With the arrival of their siege train the next day, the British began erecting batteries among the trees on La Cabaña hill overlooking the Morro (some 7 metres (23 ft) higher) as well as the city and the bay. Surprisingly, this hill had been left undefended by the Spanish army despite its well-known strategic importance. Charles III of Spain had earlier instructed Prado to fortify this hill, a task that he considered the most urgent of those relating to the fortifications. The task had been started, but no guns had been installed.

Two days later a British detachment landed at Torreón de la Chorrera, on the west side of the harbour. Meanwhile, Colonel Patrick Mackellar, an engineer, oversaw the siegeworks' construction against the Morro. Since digging trenches was impossible, he resolved to erect breastworks instead. He planned to mine towards a bastion of the Morro once his siege works had reached the ditch and to create a runway across this ditch with the rubble produced by his mining activities.

By 22 June, four British batteries, totaling twelve heavy guns and 38 mortars, opened fire on the Morro from La Cabaña. Mackellar gradually advanced his breastworks towards the ditch under cover of these batteries, so by the end of the month, the British had increased their daily direct hits on the Morro to 500. Velasco was losing as many as 30 men each day, and repairing the fortress every night was so exhausting that men had to be rotated into the fort from the city every three days. Velasco finally convinced Prado that a raid was necessary against the British batteries. At dawn on 29 June, 988 men (a mixed company of grenadiers, marines, engineers, and enslaved people) attacked the siege works. They reached the British batteries from the rear and started to spike guns, but the British reaction was swift, and the attackers were repulsed before they caused any serious damage.

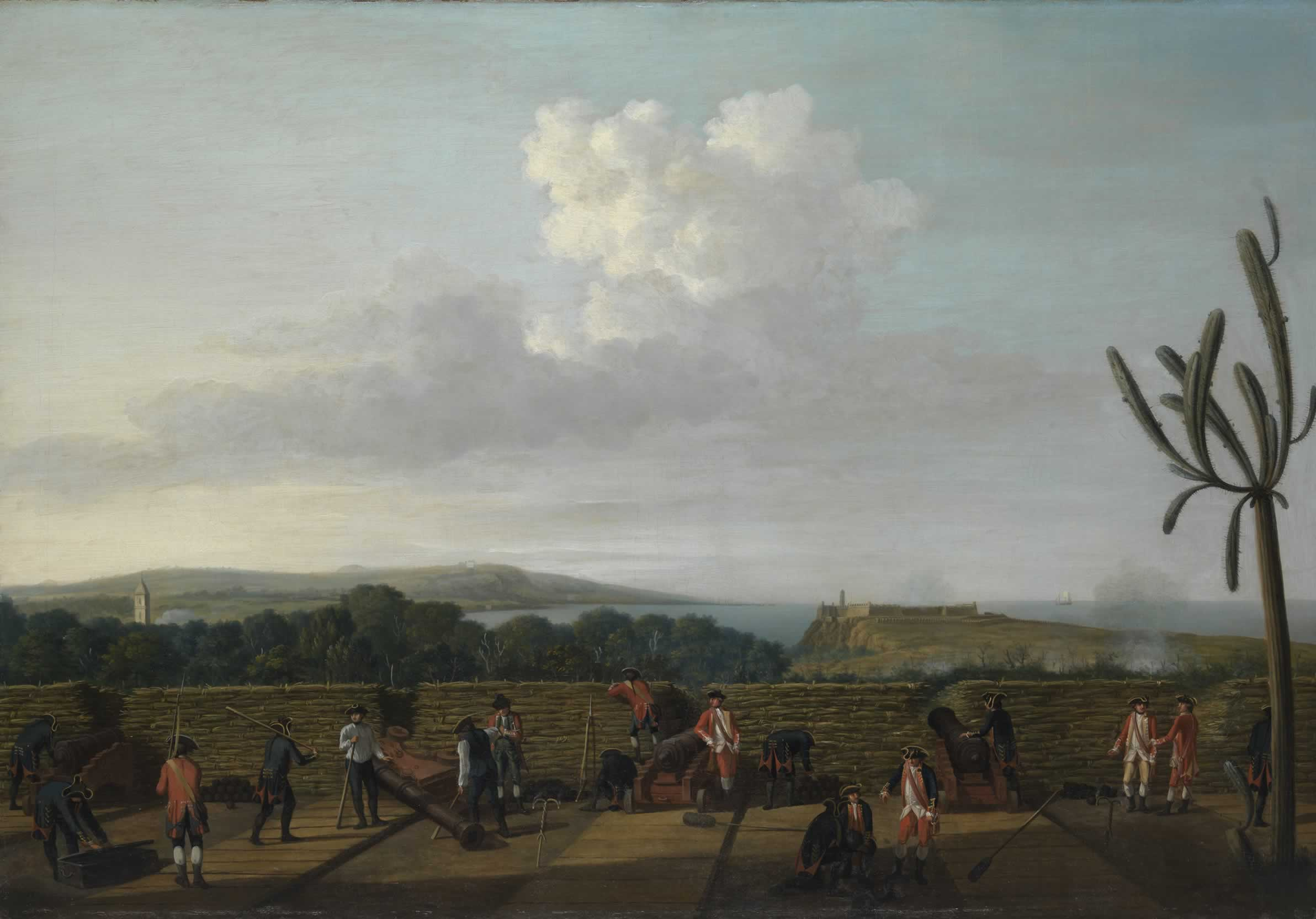
British siege guns before Morro Castle, by Dominic Serres

On 1 July, the British launched a combined land and naval attack on the Morro. The fleet detached four ships of the line for this purpose: HMS Stirling Castle, HMS Dragon, HMS Marlborough and HMS Cambridge. The naval and land artillery simultaneously opened fire on the Morro. However, naval guns were ineffective, and the fort was too high. Counter-fire from thirty guns of the Morro inflicted 192 casualties and seriously damaged the ships, one of which was later scuttled, forcing them to withdraw. Meanwhile, the bombardment by the land artillery was far more effective. By the end of the day, only three Spanish guns were still effective on the side of the Morro facing the British batteries. The next day, however, British breastworks around the Morro caught fire, and the batteries were burned down, destroying the product of much of the work undertaken since mid-June. Velasco immediately capitalised on this event, remounting many guns and repairing breaches in the fortifications of the Morro.

Since its arrival at Havana, the British army had heavily suffered from malaria and yellow fever and was now at half-strength. Since the hurricane season was approaching, Albemarle was now engaged in a race against time. He ordered the batteries to be rebuilt with the help of men of the fleet. Many 32-pounder guns were taken from the lower deck of several ships to equip these new batteries.

By 17 July, the new British batteries had progressively silenced most of Velasco's guns, leaving only two operational. With the absence of artillery cover, it became impossible for the Spanish troops to repair the damage inflicted on the Morro. Mackellar also resumed the construction of siege works to approach the fortress. With the army in such bad condition, work progressed rather slowly. The British army's only hope now resided in the expected arrival of reinforcements from North America.

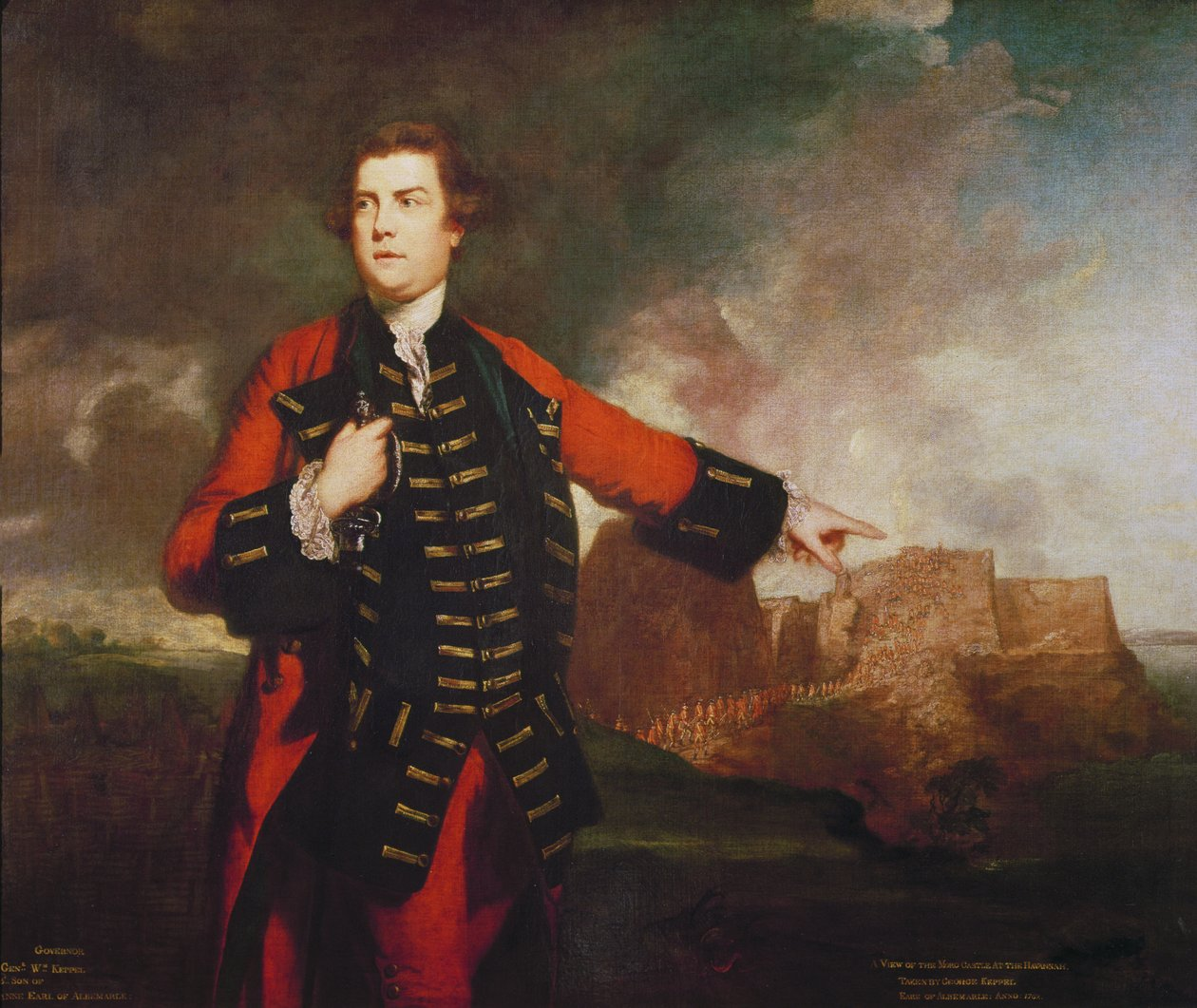
General William Keppel, Storming the Morro Castle, by Joshua Reynolds

The progress of siege works over the next few days allowed the British to begin the mining towards the right bastion of the Morro. Meanwhile, the now unopposed British artillery was daily hitting the Morro up to 600 times, causing some 60 casualties. Velasco now had no hope but to destroy British siege works. On 22 July, 1,300 regulars, seamen, and militia sallied from Havana in three columns and attacked the siege works surrounding the Morro. The British repelled the Spanish sortie, who thus withdrew to their lines, and the siege works were left relatively intact.

On 24 July, Albemarle offered Velasco the opportunity to surrender, allowing him to write his terms of capitulation. Velasco answered that the issue would instead be settled by force of arms. Three days later, the reinforcements from North America led by Colonel Burton finally arrived. These reinforcements, who had been attacked by the French during their journey, with the loss through the capture of some 500 men, consisted of

- 46th Thomas Murray's Regiment of Foot
- 58th Anstruther's Regiment of Foot
- American provincials (3,000 men)
- Gorham's and Danks' Rangers – which were combined into a 253-man ranger corps.

By 25 July 5,000 soldiers and 3,000 sailors were sick.

On 29 July, the mine near the right bastion of the Morro fort was completed and ready to explode. Albemarle vainly feigned an assault, hoping that Velasco would finally decide to surrender. On the contrary, Velasco launched a desperate attack from the sea upon the British miners in the ditch. At 2:00 am the next day, two Spanish schooners attacked the miners from the sea. Their attack was unsuccessful, and they had to withdraw. At 1:00 pm, the British finally detonated the mine. The debris of the explosion partly filled the ditch, but Albemarle judged it passable, and launched an assault, sending 699 picked men against the right bastion. Before the Spanish could react, sixteen men gained a foothold on the bastion. Velasco rushed to the breach with his troops and was mortally wounded during the ensuing hand-to-hand fighting. The Spanish forces fell back, leaving the British in control of the Morro fort. Velasco was transported back to Havana, but by 31 July, had died of his wounds.

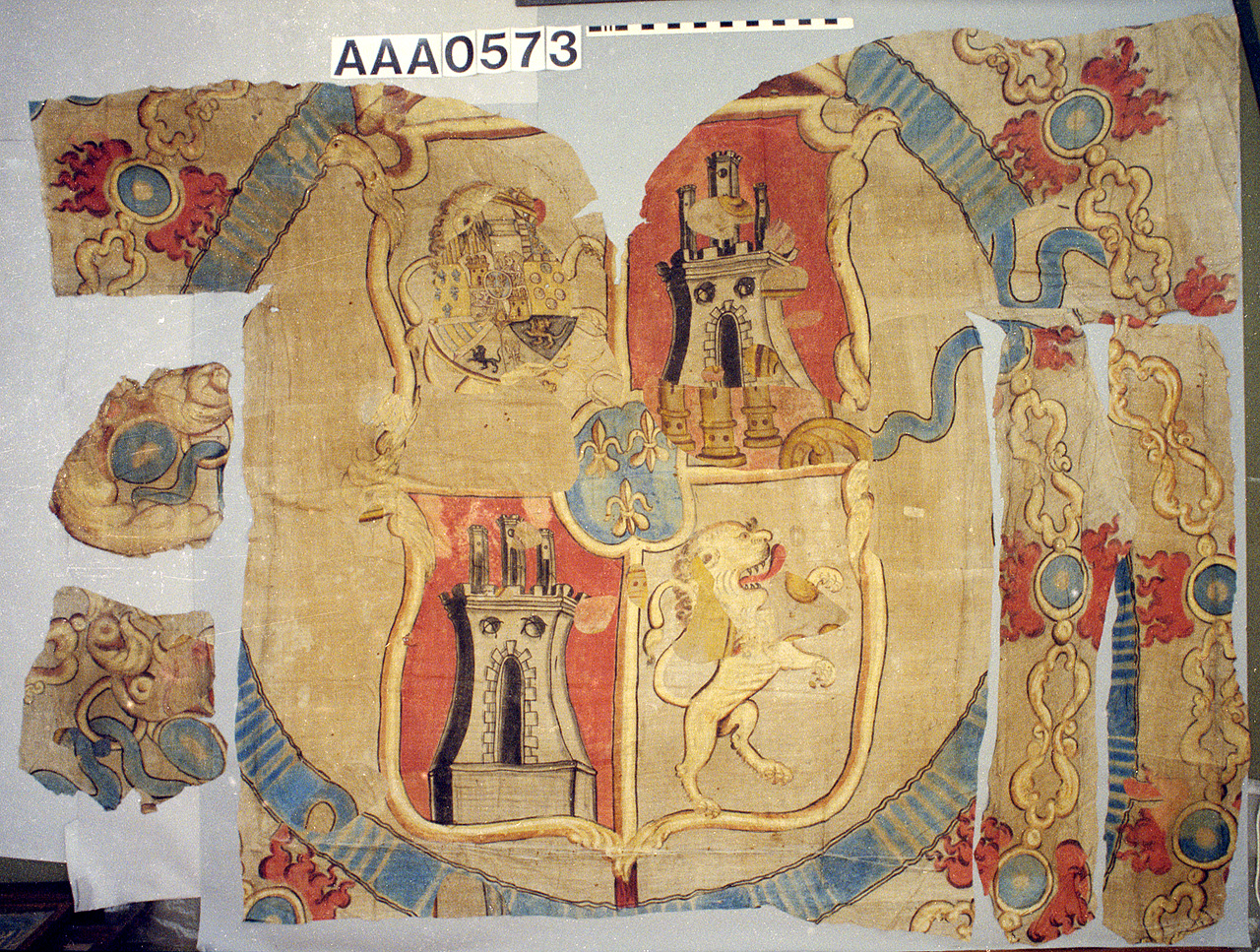
Parts of a patched Spanish flag captured during the assault on Morro Castle, showing arms of Castile and Leon with Bourbon arms in the centre surrounded by Order of the Golden Fleece (from Royal Museums Greenwich)

The British then occupied a position commanding the city of Havana and the bay. Artillery batteries were brought up along the north side of the entrance channel from the Morro fort to La Cabanña Hill, where they could be trained directly on the town.

=== Surrender ===
On 11 August, after Prado had rejected the demand for surrender sent to him by Albemarle, the British batteries opened fire on Havana. A total of 47 guns (15 × 32-pdrs, 32 × 24-pdrs), ten mortars, and five howitzers pounded the city from a distance of 500–800 m. By the end of the day, Fort la Punta was silenced. Prado had no other choice left but to surrender.

The next day, Prado was informed that there was only sufficient ammunition for a few more days. He made belated plans to remove the bullion in Havana and move to another part of the island, but the city was surrounded by it. Negotiations of the articles of capitulation of the city and the fleet went on, and Prado and his army obtained the honours of war on 13 August. Hevia neglected to burn his fleet, which fell intact in the hands of the British.

The significant losses of men in the attack on Havana ended any possibility of an attack on Louisiana, and the French took advantage of the removal of so many troops from Canada to capture Newfoundland with a small force of fifteen hundred soldiers. Newfoundland was recaptured in the Battle of Signal Hill on September 15, 1762.

== Aftermath ==
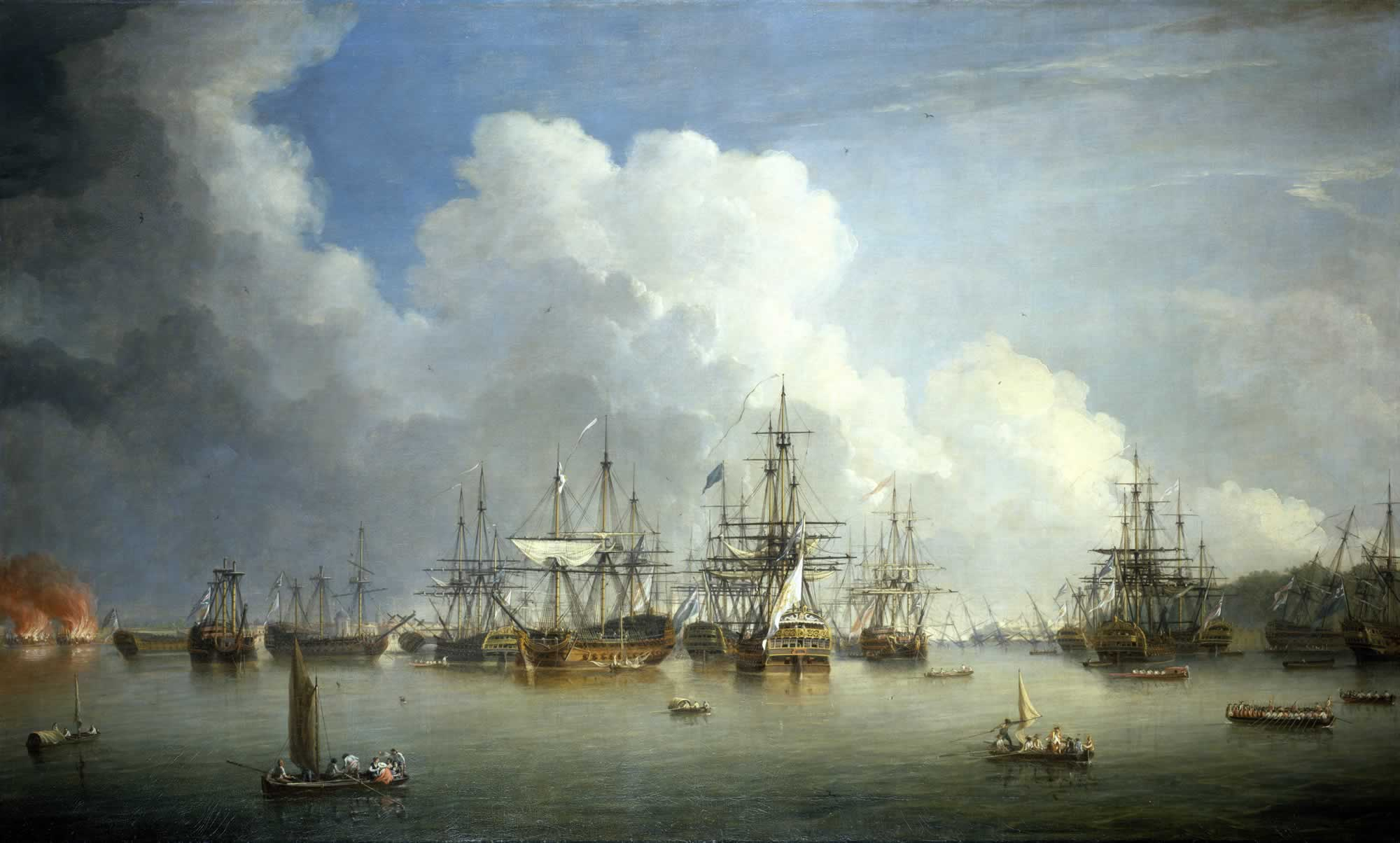
The Captured Spanish Fleet at Havana, August–September 1762, by Dominic Serres

On 14 August, the British entered the city. They possessed the most important harbour in the Spanish West Indies, military equipment, 1,828,116 Spanish pesos, and merchandise valued around 1,000,000. Furthermore, they had seized nine ships of the line in Havana harbour, representing one-fifth of the strength of the Spanish Navy, namely Aquilón (74), Conquistador (74), Reina (70), San Antonio (64), Tigre (70), San Jenaro (60), América (60), Infante (74) and Soberano (74), together with a ship of 78 guns belonging to the Compañía de La Habana, a number of smaller armed vessels belonging to it and the Compañía de Caracas and nearly 100 merchant ships. Two new almost-completed ships of the line in the dockyard, the San Carlos (80) and Santiago (80), were burnt. In addition, two small frigates or corvettes and two 18-gun sloops, including the Marte commanded by Domingo de Bonechea, and several smaller vessels were captured either along the Cuban coast or in Havana harbour.

After the capture, Prize money payments of £122,697 each were made to Pocock as naval commander and to Albemarle as military commander, with £24,539 paid to Commodore Keppel, the naval second-in-command who was Albemarle's younger brother. Each of the 42 naval captains present received £1,600 as prize money. The military second-in-command, Lieutenant-General Eliott, received the same amount as Commodore Keppel, as the two shared a fifteenth part of the prize pool, as against the third shared by their commanders. Elliot was able to buy Bayley Park in East Sussex, which he altered and enlarged. Privates in the army received just over £4, and ordinary seamen rather less than £4 each.

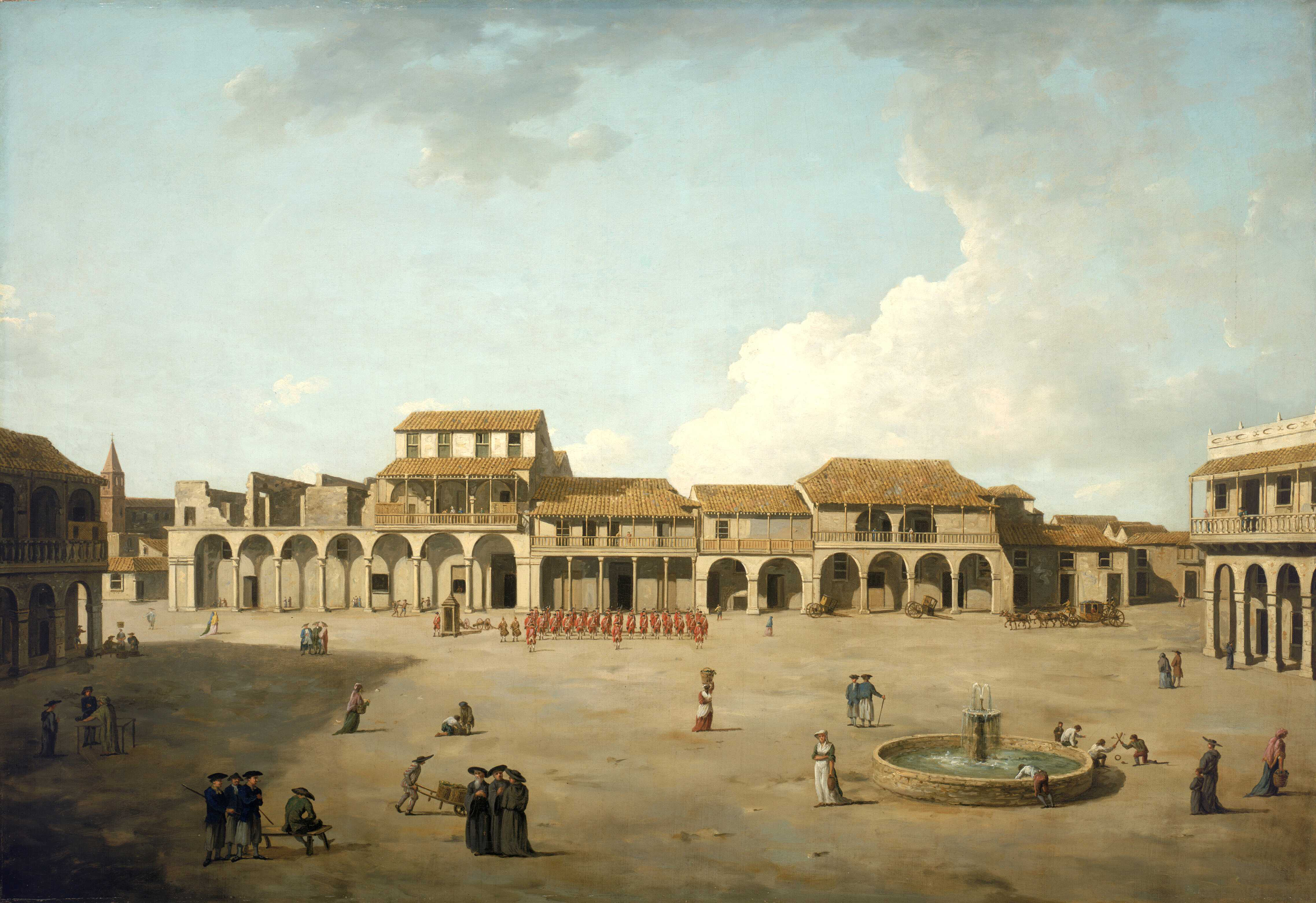
The Piazza at Havana by Dominic Serres. British troops at the Plaza Vieja during their occupation of Havana in 1762.

During the siege, the British had lost 2,764 killed, wounded, captured, or deserted, but by 18 October, they also had lost 4,708 dead from sickness. One of the most depleted brigades was transferred to North America, losing another 360 men within a month of arrival. Three ships of the line were lost either as a direct result of Spanish gunfire or severe damage received, which would cause their demise later. Shortly after the siege HMS Stirling Castle was declared unserviceable and was stripped and scuttled. HMS Marlborough sank in the Atlantic due to extensive damage received during the siege, and HMS Temple was lost while returning to Britain for repairs.

Charles III appointed a commission of generals to try Prado, and others considered culpable for the loss of Havana on their return to Spain. Prado, Hevia, and nine other military and civil officials were accused of treason, and their trial was, in effect, a court-martial. However, it examined their actions during Prado's governorship and tactical decisions taken during the siege, although Prado and several officials were not military officers. The commission placed most of the blame on Prado and Hevia, finding them to have failed to fortify the Cabaña hill properly and to have abandoned it too easily, to have crippled the Spanish fleet by sinking blockships that prevented the remainder taking action against the British and surrendered them intact rather than burning them; they had not mounted any significant counterattacks and, finally, had not removed the royal treasury before the surrender. After a lengthy trial, Prado was found guilty and sentenced to death but was reprieved and died in prison. Hevia was sentenced to 10 years' house arrest and the loss of his office and titles but was later pardoned and reinstated: a leading official, Julián de Arriaga, was dismissed from office. Velasco's family was ennobled, and his son was created Marqués de Velasco del Morro, and Charles III decreed that there should be a ship named Velasco in the Spanish fleet after that. The loss of Havana and Western Cuba was a severe blow to Spain. Not only were the financial losses considerable, the loss in prestige was even greater. This defeat, together with the conquest of Manila by the British one and a half months later, meant the loss of Spain's 'Key to the New World and Rampart of the West Indies' as well as its colonial capital of the Spanish East Indies. These events confirmed British naval supremacy and showed the fragility of the Spanish Empire. Just as the earlier War of Jenkins' Ear had forced the British government into thoroughly reviewing its military, this war forced the Spanish government into undertaking a similar process. The invasions of Havana and Manilla were the catalyst for profound political and military reforms in the Spanish overseas empire.

It was clear to the Spanish authorities that their regular army in Cuba could not match the strength that the British army was able to concentrate. It was, therefore, necessary to form a disciplined colonial militia, with adequate weapons and training, supervised by experienced officers and non-commissioned officers, with an organisation and uniforms similar to the regulars. The regular garrison of about 3,200 would be backed by a disciplined militia of eight infantry battalions and one regiment each of cavalry and dragoons, totaling 7,500 soldiers, with many of the officers from prominent Cuban families. Havana and Manila were returned to Spain as a result of the Treaty of Paris signed in February 1763. Still, the British occupation lasted until two months later, when a newly appointed Captain General of Cuba, Alejandro O'Reilly, arrived to re-establish Spanish rule. Spain agreed to cede Florida and Menorca to Great Britain. The loss of Florida and the Spanish acceptance of British occupation of the Miskito Coast heightened Cuba's value as the first line of defence for the Spanish South American colonies. Spain received French Louisiana as payment for intervening in the war on the side of the French and as compensation for having lost Florida.

== Exhibition ==
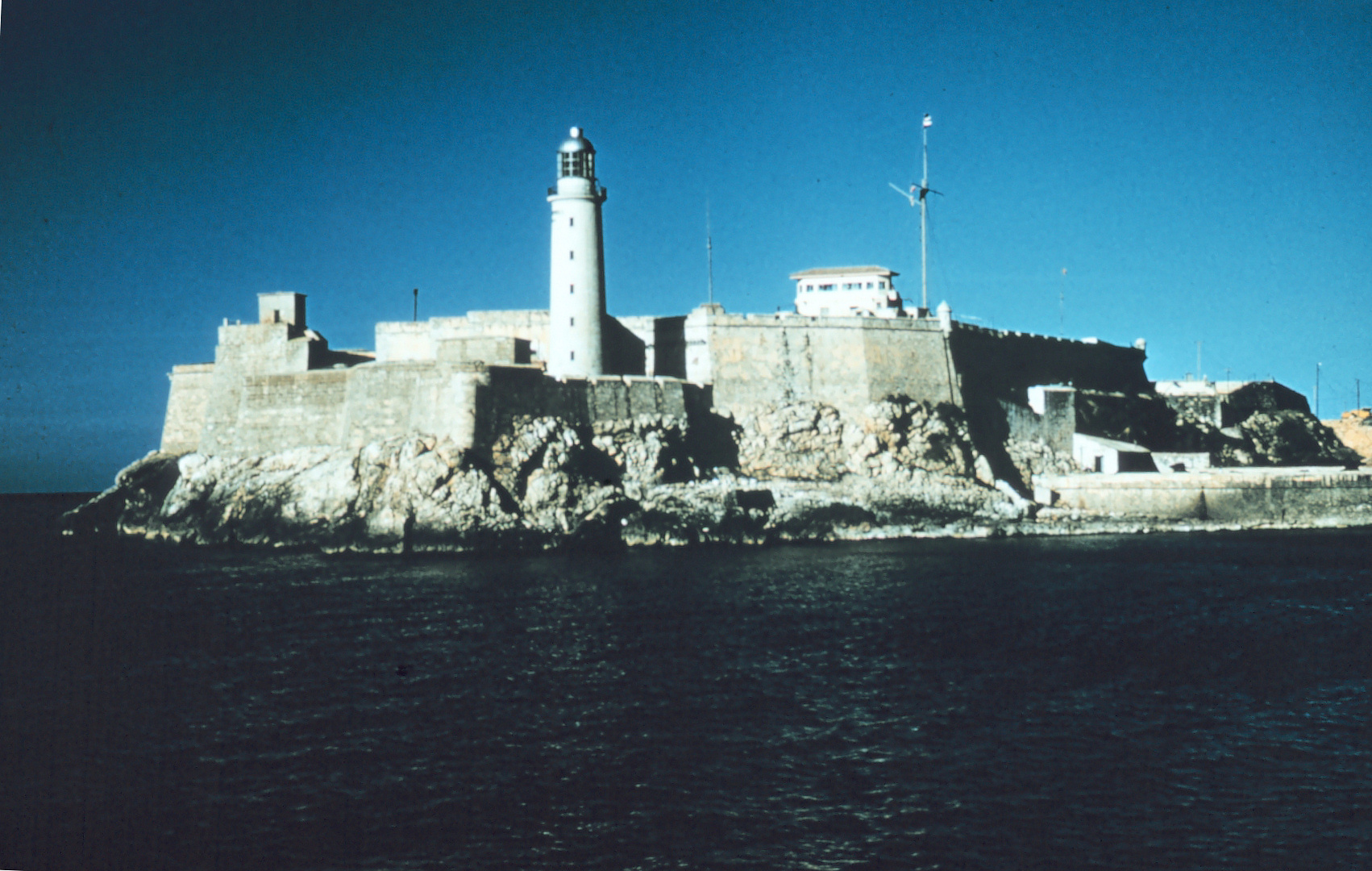
El Morro

El Morro once housed a school for lighthouse keepers. There was a watchtower here until the British blew it up during their successful siege in 1762. The Faro Castillo del Morro lighthouse was added in 1846.

The cannons around the fort are now severely rusted, but the walls are well-preserved. The fort has central barracks up to four stories high. A small underwater archeology exhibition is also located here. Noteworthy are the old latrines and their chute into the sea, as are the two sets of doors and the drawbridge mechanism. The current harbor master's office is still housed in the fortress. A plaque dedicated by the ambassador of the United Kingdom commemorates the 1762 siege, and a small memorial is located between two strong powder rooms in the northeast bastion.

A small turret at the end of the wall offers views of the sea crashing onto the rocks 20 meters below and of the substantial dry moat. The opposite side of the moat holds more modern guns and cannons, La Bateria de Velasco, and offers a sweeping view down to Cojimar.

== El cañonazo de las 9 ==
A cannon is fired at 9 pm nightly; the "El Cañonazo de las 9" is a leftover custom kept from colonial times signaling the closure of the city gates.

== Culture ==
=== Art ===
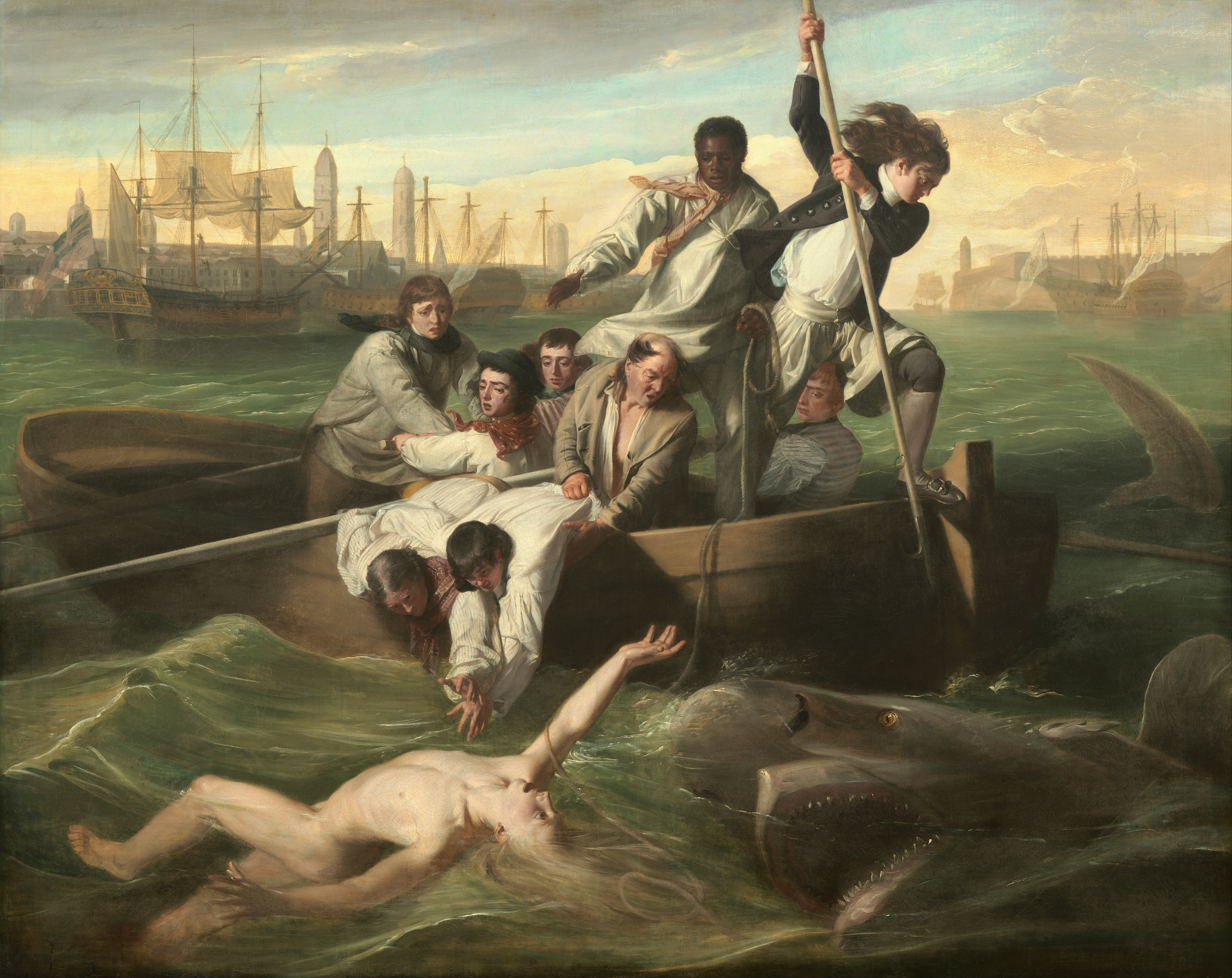
Watson and the Shark, 1778, by American painter John Singleton Copley, he included the Castle of the Three Magi Kings of Morro and Havana in the background at right. Watson is the boy in the water.

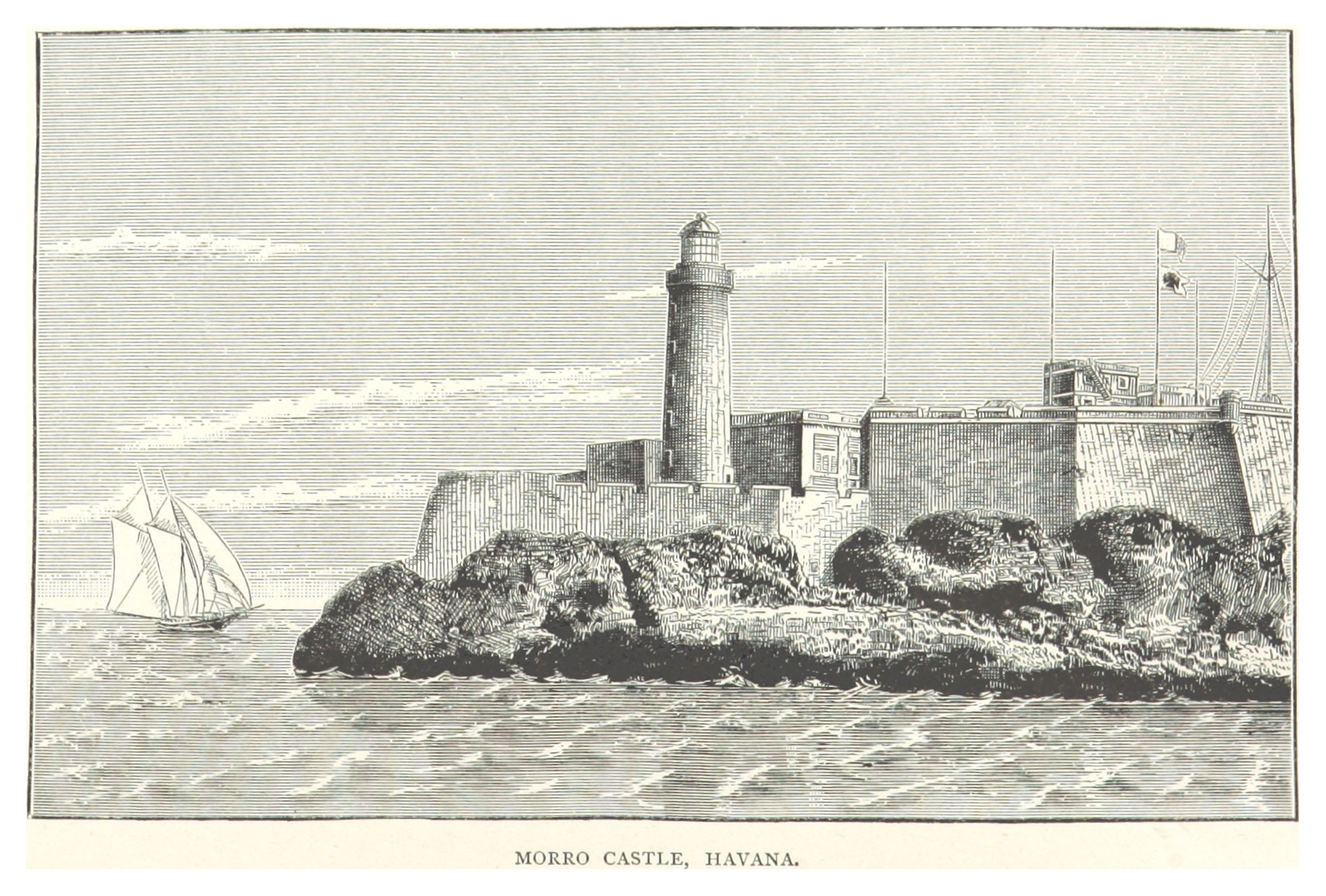
Morro Castle in 1885, image extracted from page 433 of The Cruise of the Montauk to Bermuda, the West Indies ..., by James Macquade.

Morro Castle can be seen in the background of John Singleton Copley's oil painting Watson and the Shark (1778).

=== Film ===
Morro Castle appears in the movie The Ghost Breakers (1940) in the background as Bob Hope and Paulette Goddard enter the harbor by ship.

The climactic scenes from The Big Boodle (1957) starring Errol Flynn were shot at Morro Castle in pre-Castro Cuba.

During his life, the Castro government imprisoned the Cuban poet and novelist Reinaldo Arenas (1943-1990) at El Morro Castle for criticism of the government. The film version of Arenas's autobiography, Before Night Falls (2000), starring Javier Bardem, features scenes set in El Morro Castle prison. (A fortress in Mexico City doubled for the prison since the filmmakers were not allowed to film in Cuba.)

=== Literature ===
The Cuban writer José Antonio Echeverría (1815-1885) published his only novel, Antonelli (1839), in the periodical La Cartera Cubana in three parts. A historical novel in the tradition of Walter Scott, Antonelli describes the love triangle between Antonelli, a Spanish soldier, and the planter's daughter they both love. Morro Castle is the setting for many of the book's events, including its tragic finale.

== Gallery ==
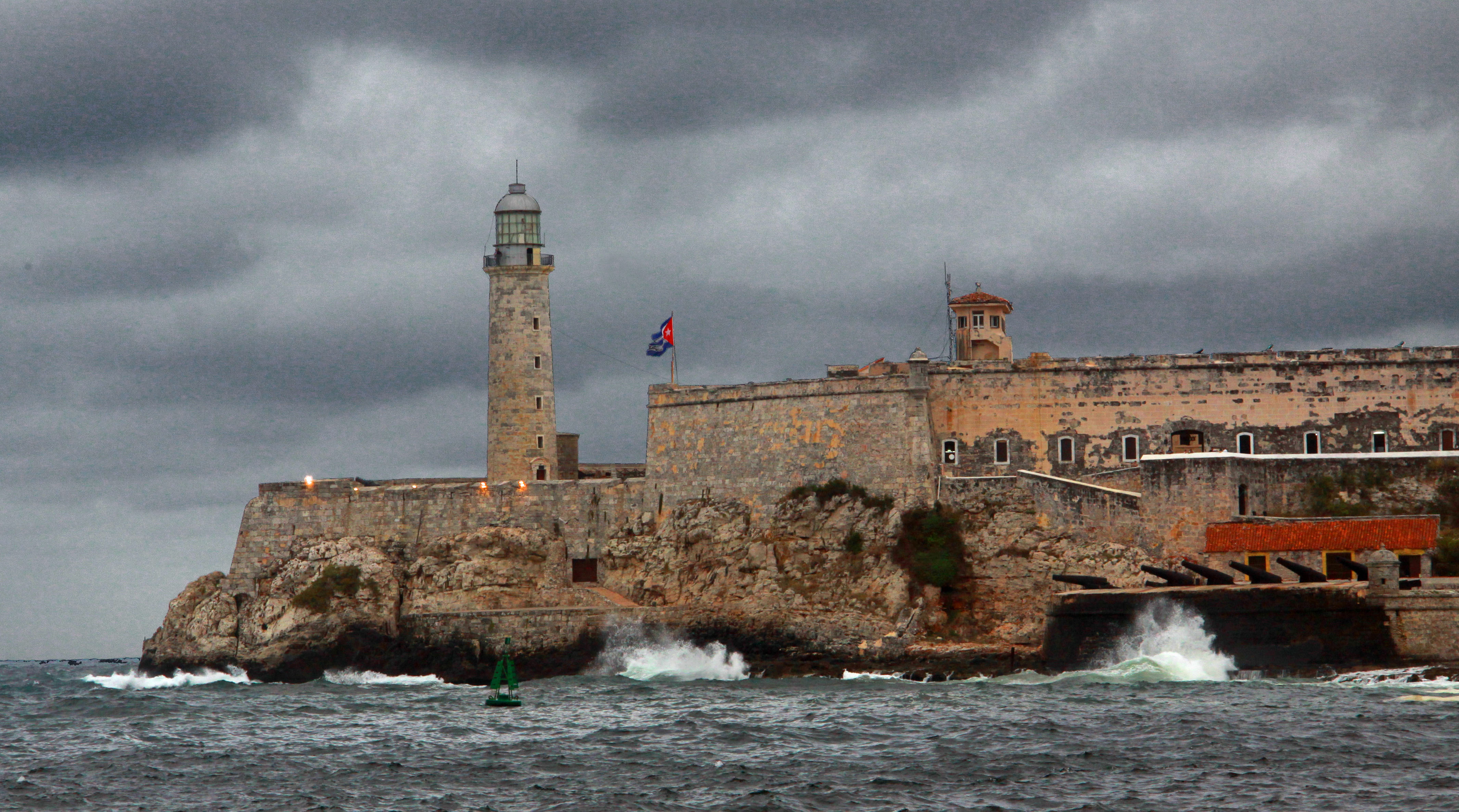
Morro Castle

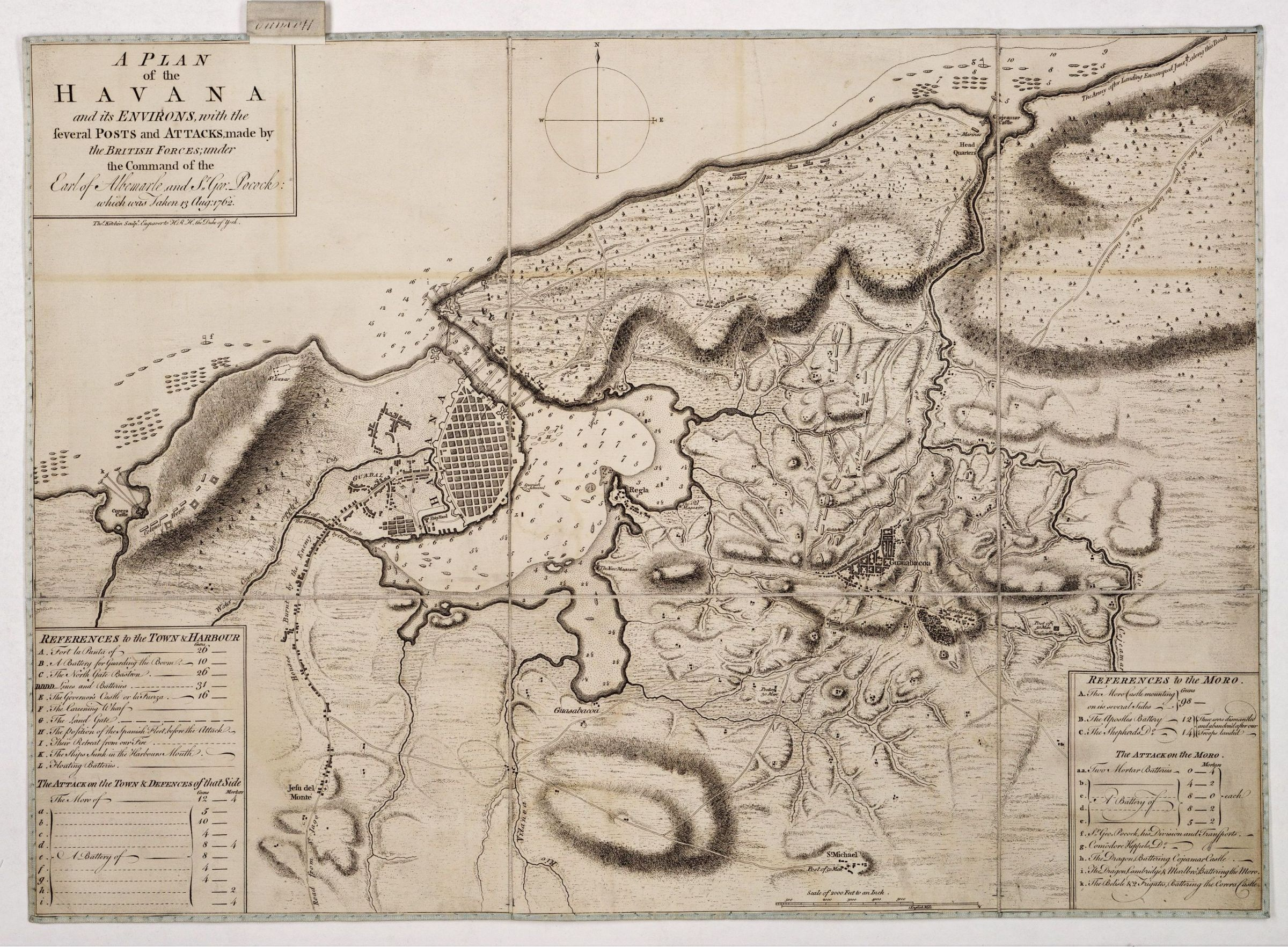
British forces under the command of the Earl of Albemarle, and Sr George Pocock, 13 Aug: 1762

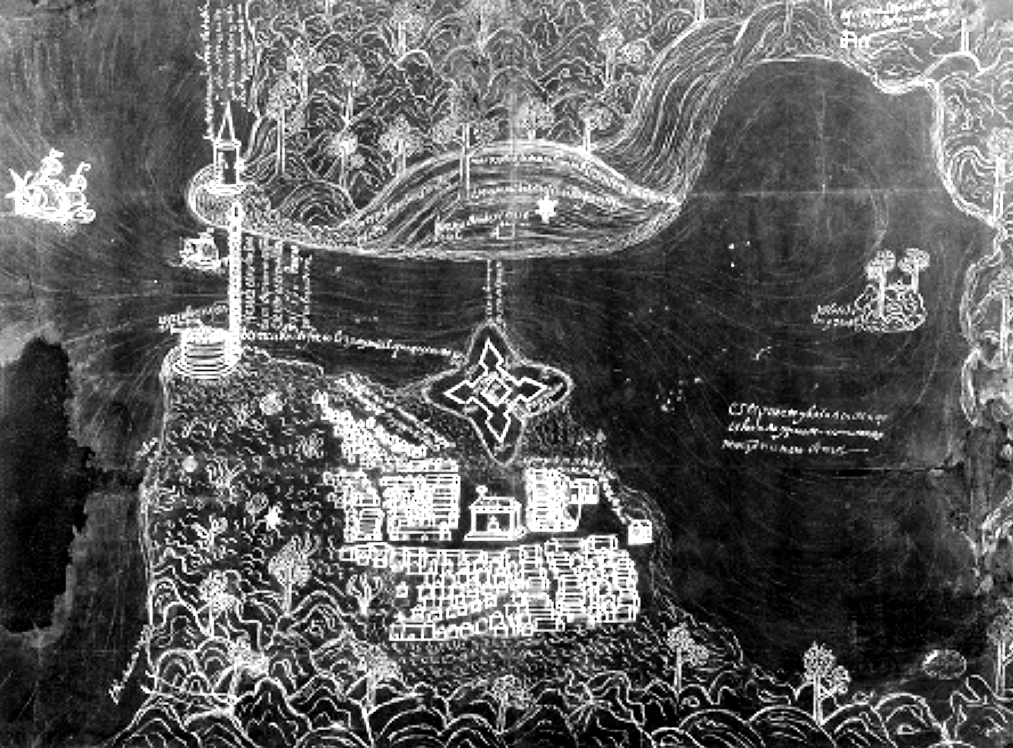
Morro castle and La Punta protected the entrance of the harbor with a chain strung out across the water, known as the boom defence. Drawing by Francisco Calvillo, 1576

Plan of Morro Castle, located at the entrance to the Port of Havana

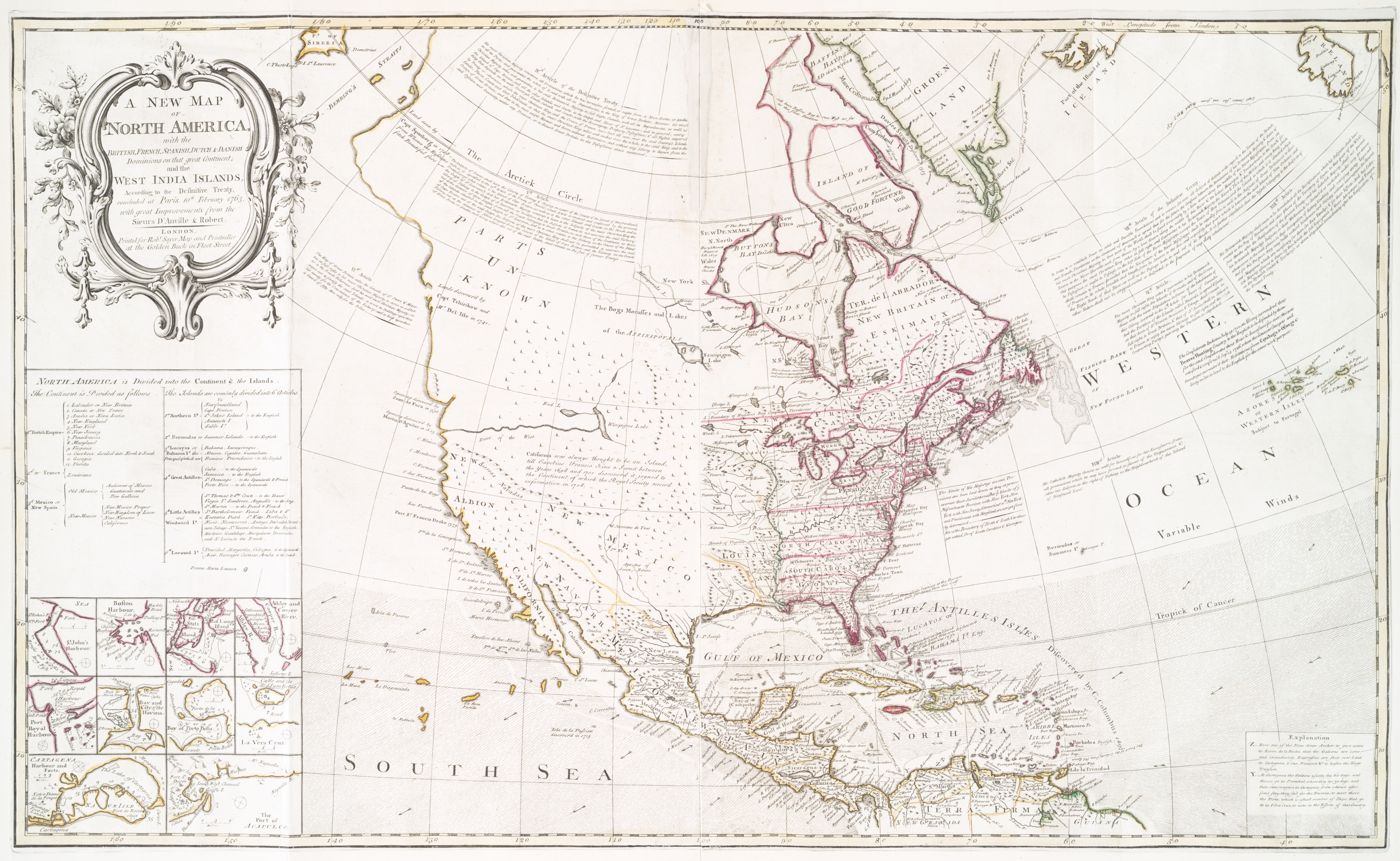
"A new map of North America" following the Treaty of Paris

Relief shown by shading, oriented with north toward the lower left. Insets: Castle of Morro—Fort of La Punta

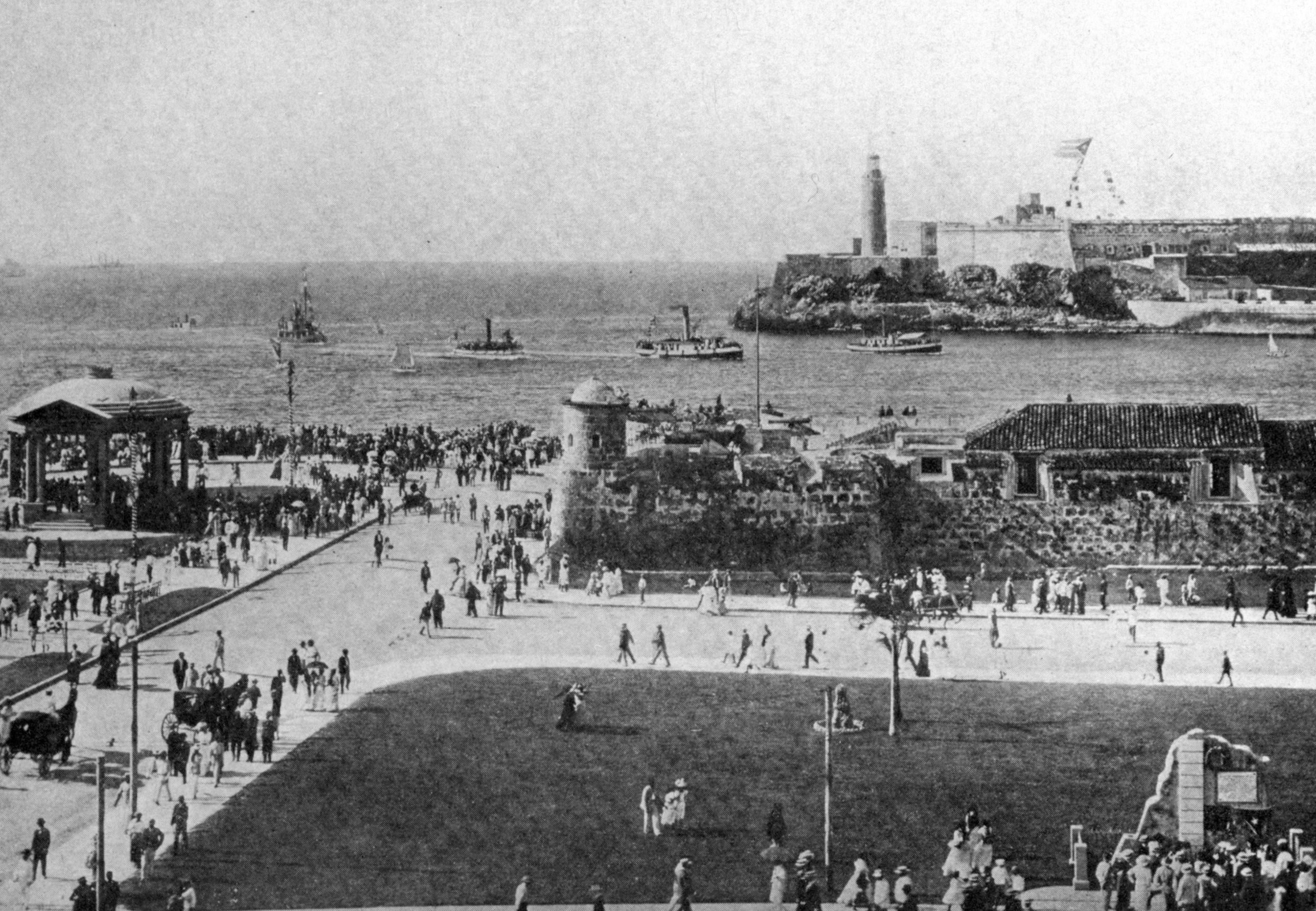
Morro Castle and Entrance to Havana Harbour, in 1916, by John Muir, A Thousand Mile Walk to the Gulf

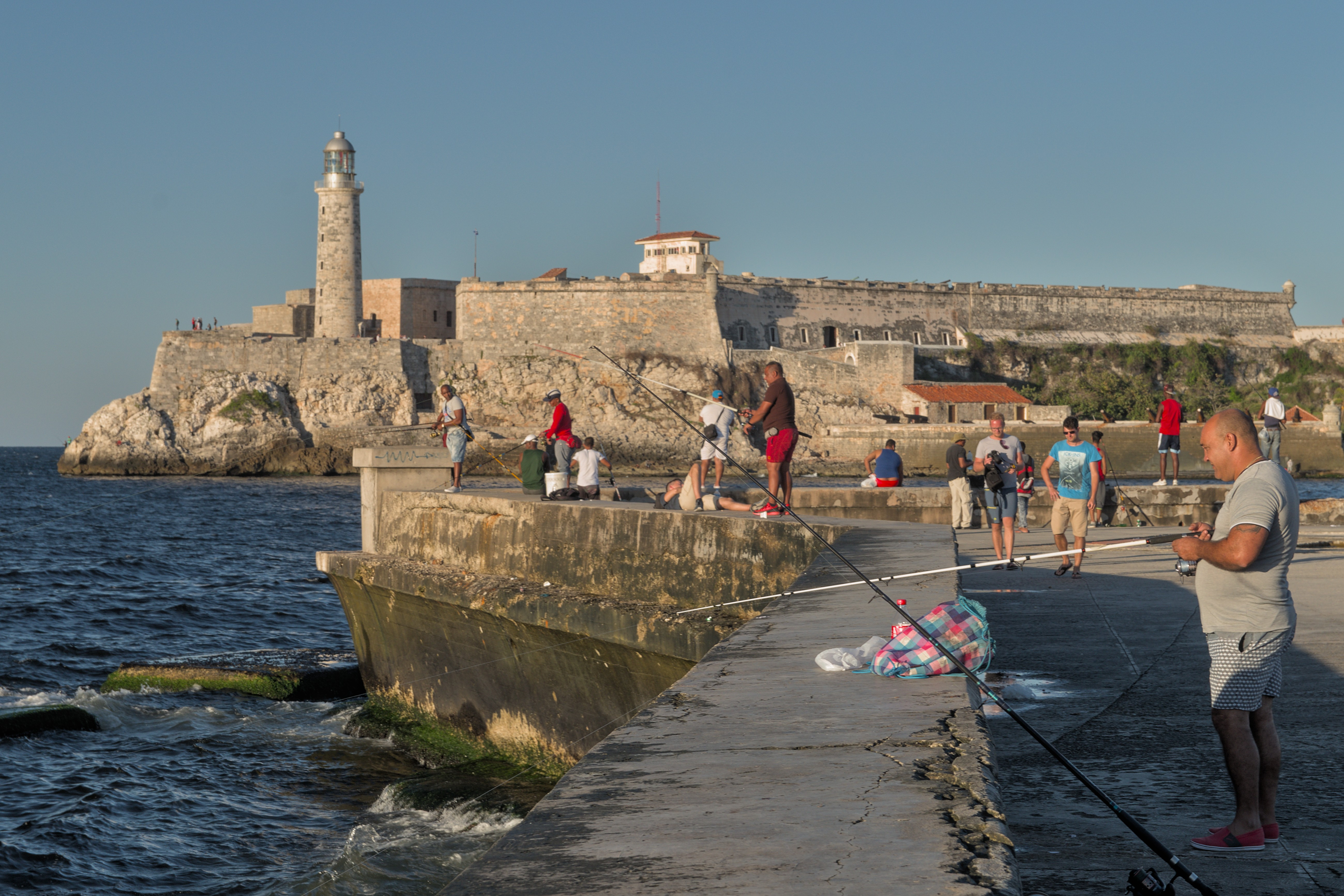
Cubans fishing next to the castle

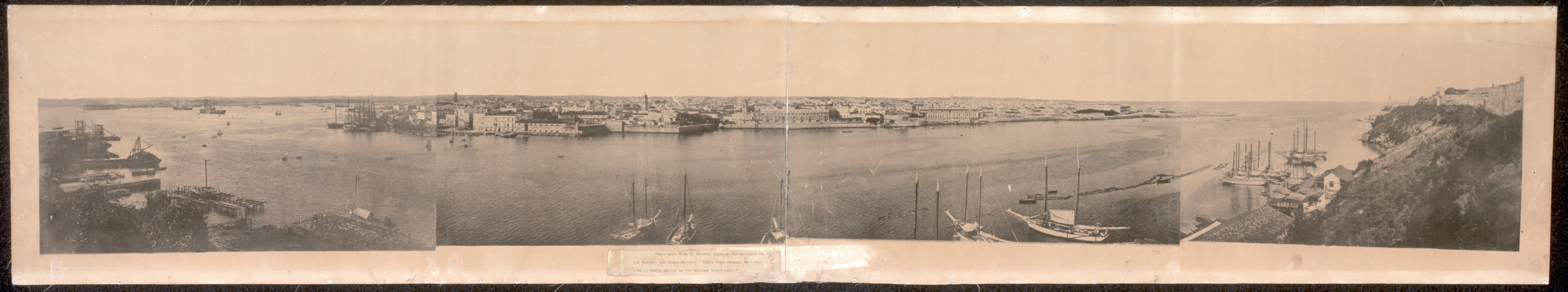
Panoramic view of Havana, showing the entrance to the harbour and inner harbour; taken from Cabañas Fortress showing Morro Castle on the extreme right-hand
Malecón

== See also ==
- Charles III of Spain* Treaty of Paris (1763)
- Batería de la de la Reina
- Castillo San Salvador de la Punta
- Santa Clara Battery
- Castillo del Príncipe (Havana)
- La Cabaña
- Timeline of Havana
