= Ponta Delgada (disambiguation) =

Ponta Delgada is the largest city and administrative capital of the Autonomous Region of the Azores in Portugal.

Ponta Delgada may also refer to:

- Ponta Delgada (district), a former district in the Azores, centered on the city
- Ponta Delgada, Santa Cruz das Flores, a civil parish in the municipality of Santa Cruz das Flores in the Azores
- Ponta Delgada, São Vicente, a civil parish in the municipality of São Vicente in Madeira, Portugal
- Ponta Delgada S.C., a former American soccer club based in Fall River, Massachusetts

== See also ==
- Punta Delgada (disambiguation)
- Ponta (disambiguation)
