= Castillo San Salvador de la Punta =

Fortress in Havana, Cuba

Coordinates: 23°08′46.51″N 82°21′27.79″W

- Castillo San Salvador de la Punta
- Interactive map of the Castillo San Salvador de la Punta area

Technical details
- Structural system: Load bearing
- Material: Masonry
- Floor area: 3,247.50 m^{2} (34,955.8 sq ft)
- Grounds: 23,102.58 m^{2} (248,674.1 sq ft)

Castillo San Salvador de la Punta is a fortress at the entrance to the bay in Havana, Cuba.

== History ==
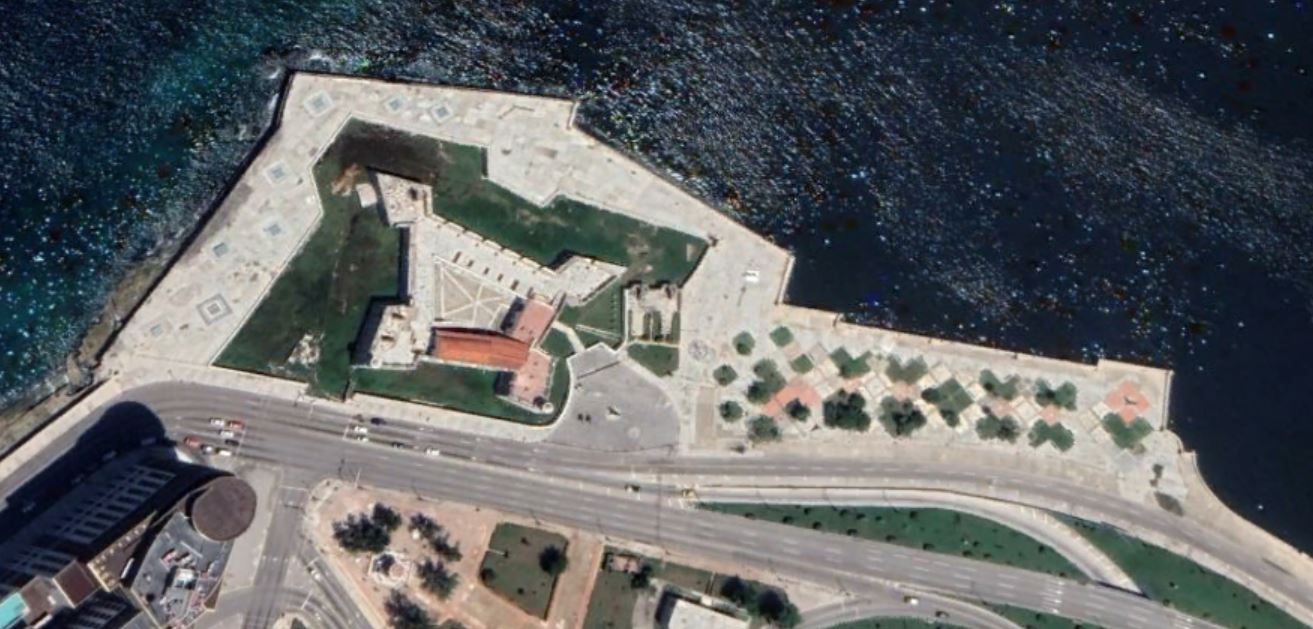
Castillo San Salvador de la Punta, Havana, Cuba

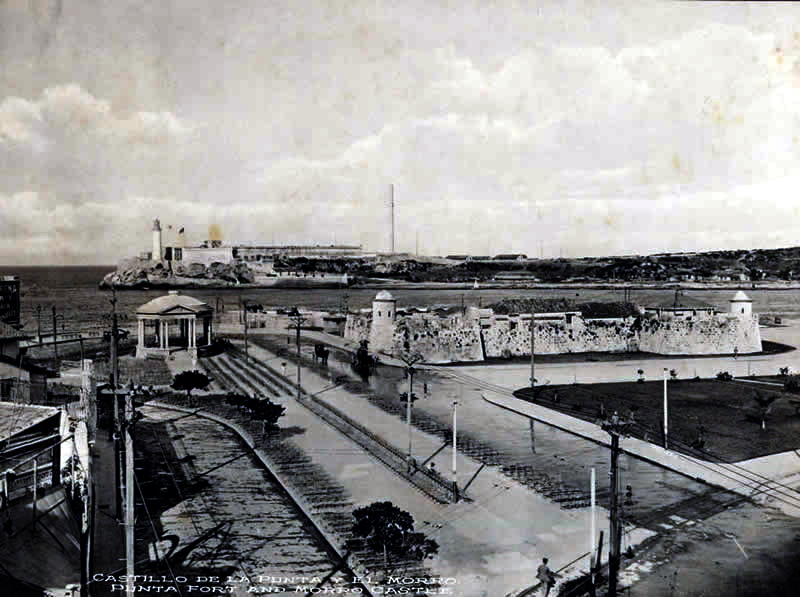
Castillo San Salvador de la Punta, Havana, Cuba

La Punta, like El Morro, was designed to protect access to Havana from frequent attack by corsairs. Initially, in 1559, lookouts were posted at La Punta.In 1582 King Philip II of Spain, convinced that it was necessary to reinforce fortresses and fleets, ordered the creation of a fortress system in several places of America, centered on Havana. Juan de Tejeda (1593 - 1602) was appointed governor of the island because of his expertise in fortification. He brought along the Italian engineer Giovanni Battista Antonelli, who has been considered the most renowned professional to practice in 16th century Cuba. The works began by 1590 and went on slowly. In 1595 a hurricane severely damaged the fortress, among other reasons, due to the thinness of its walls that were then more solidly rebuilt. By 1602 there was such a delay in the construction work that the engineer decided to make the fortress into a keep holding some 10 to 12 artillery pieces. Finally, as the years went by it was taken apart, leaving just 3 bastions.

In 1630, due to the short distance between La Punta and El Morro and to increase the protection of the bay, a heavy copper chain was laid between them. One can see this chain in some of the engravings of that time.

In 1762 the British expedition against Cuba took its toll on all the fortresses. The safety curtains and bastions of La Punta were destroyed during the invasion. At this time a chain branching out in several directions and held by heavy wood beams was laid. Its ends were tied to guns set-in at La Punta and El Morro. Some fragments of this piece still remain.

Later on, with the Spanish back in power, a new governor arrived, fixing and enlarging the fortification system. In the 19th century some changes, such as the 4 esplanades built to accommodate a corresponding number of artillery pieces, were added at La Punta.

In 1851 the Spanish executed most of the prisoners they held at La Punta, including Venezuelan adventurer Narciso López, after a failed attempt to liberate Cuba that caused outrage in the United States.

== Cuba under attack (1500 - 1800) ==
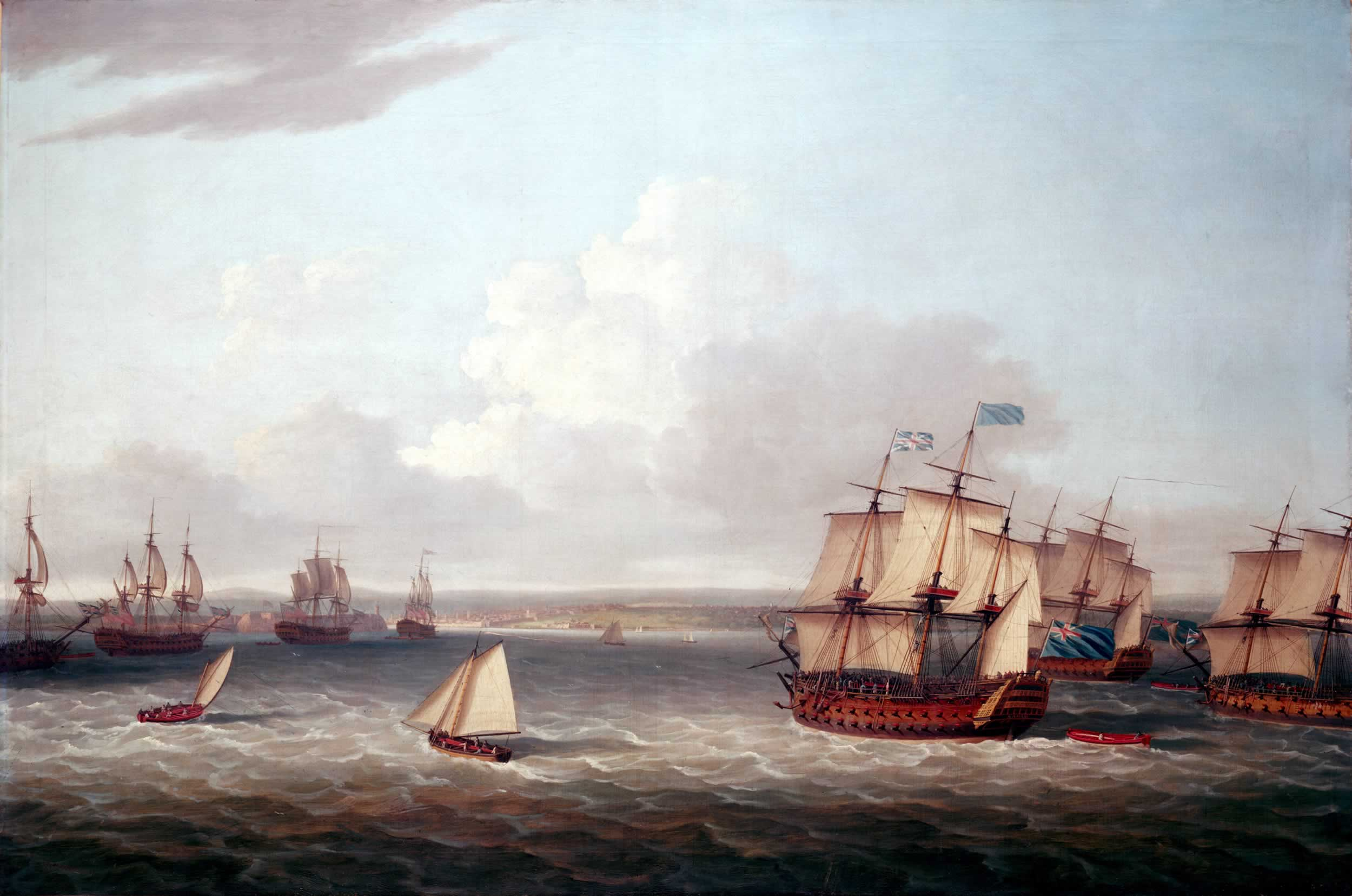
The British Fleet Entering Havana, 21 August 1762, a 1775 painting by Dominic Serres

Colonial Cuba was a frequent target of buccaneers, pirates and French corsairs seeking Spain's New World riches. In response to repeated raids, defenses were bolstered throughout the island during the 16th century. In Havana, the fortress of Castillo de los Tres Reyes Magos del Morro was built to deter potential invaders, which included the English privateer Francis Drake, who sailed within sight of Havana harbor but did not disembark on the island. Havana's inability to resist invaders was dramatically exposed in 1628, when a Dutch fleet led by Piet Heyn plundered the Spanish ships in the city's harbor. In 1662, Christopher Myngs with a small fleet from Jamaica captured and briefly occupied Santiago de Cuba on the eastern part of the island, in an effort to open up Cuba's protected trade with Jamaica.

Nearly a century later, the British Royal Navy launched another invasion, capturing Guantánamo Bay in 1741 during the War of Jenkins' Ear with Spain. Edward Vernon, the British admiral who devised the scheme, saw his 4,000 occupying troops capitulate to raids by Spanish troops, and more critically, an epidemic, forcing him to withdraw his fleet to British Jamaica. In the War of the Austrian Succession, the British carried out unsuccessful attacks against Santiago de Cuba in 1741 and again in 1748. Additionally, a skirmish between British and Spanish naval squadrons occurred near Havana in 1748.

The Seven Years' War, which erupted in 1754 across three continents, eventually arrived in the Spanish Caribbean. Spain's alliance with the French pitched them into direct conflict with the British, and in 1762 a British expedition of five warships and 4,000 troops set out from Portsmouth to capture Cuba. The British arrived on 6 June, and by August had Havana under siege. When Havana surrendered, the admiral of the British fleet, George Keppel, the 3rd Earl of Albemarle, entered the city as a new colonial governor and took control of the whole western part of the island. The arrival of the British immediately opened up trade with their North American and Caribbean colonies, causing a rapid transformation of Cuban society.

Though Havana, which had become the third-largest city in the Americas, was to enter an era of sustained development and closening ties with North America during this period, the British occupation of the city proved short-lived. Pressure from London sugar merchants fearing a decline in sugar prices forced a series of negotiations with the Spanish over colonial territories. Less than a year after Havana was seized, the Peace of Paris was signed by the three warring powers, ending the Seven Years' War. The treaty gave Britain Florida in exchange for Cuba on France's recommendation to Spain, The French advised that declining the offer could result in Spain losing Mexico and much of the South American mainland to the British. In 1781, General Bernardo de Gálvez, the Spanish governor of Louisiana, reconquered Florida for Spain with Mexican, Puerto Rican, Dominican, and Cuban troops.

== Intervention ==
At the end of the 90s, the Office of the city Historian was in charge of an intervention that restored original elements to recover original spaces. With the archaeological work carried out, valuable pieces were rescued that were exposed when it opened its doors as a museum. However, the proximity to the sea, adverse weather conditions, and corrosion agents affected the facility in a few years, which was forced to close the doors due to the danger to its collections.

== Gallery ==
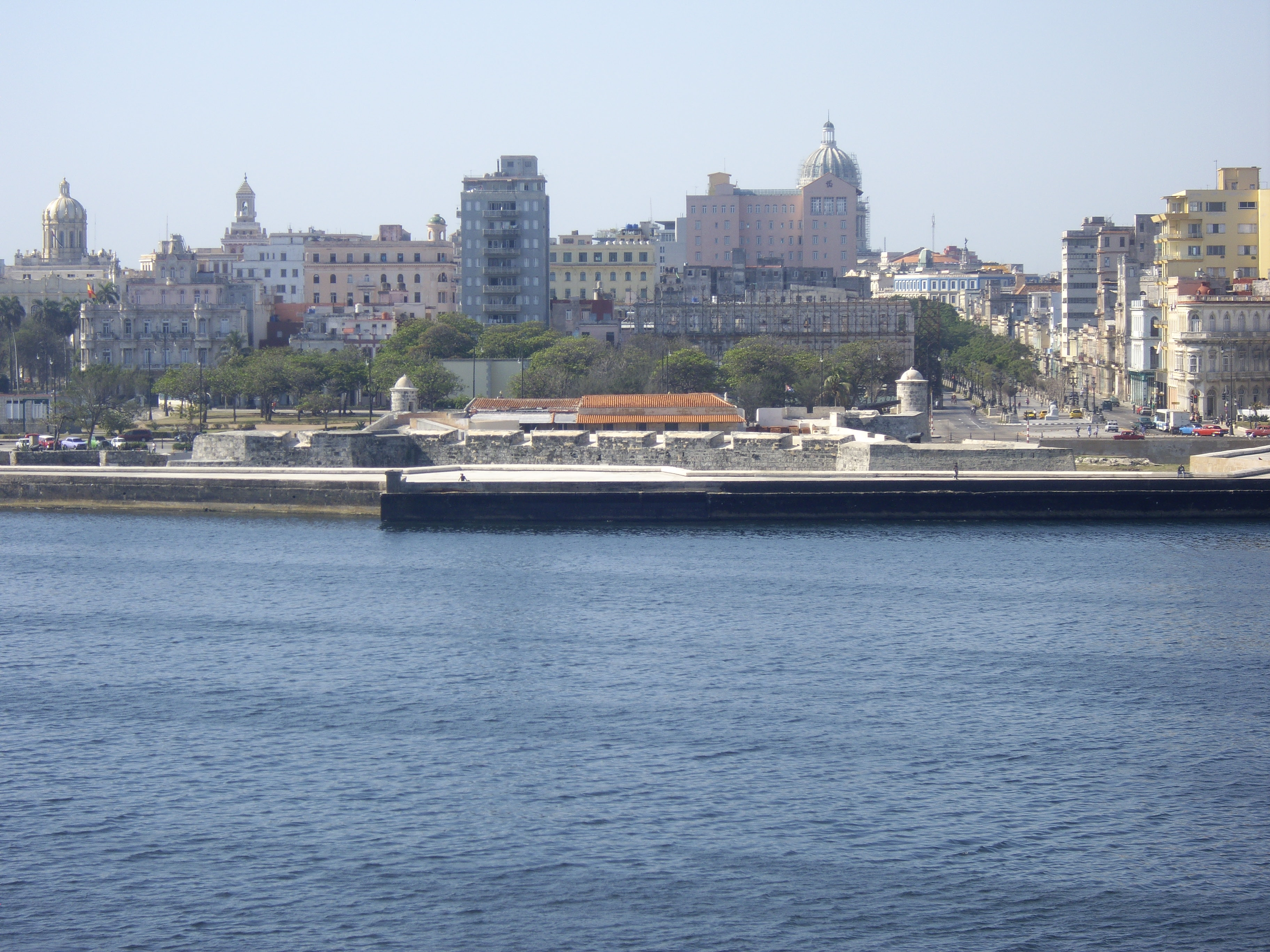

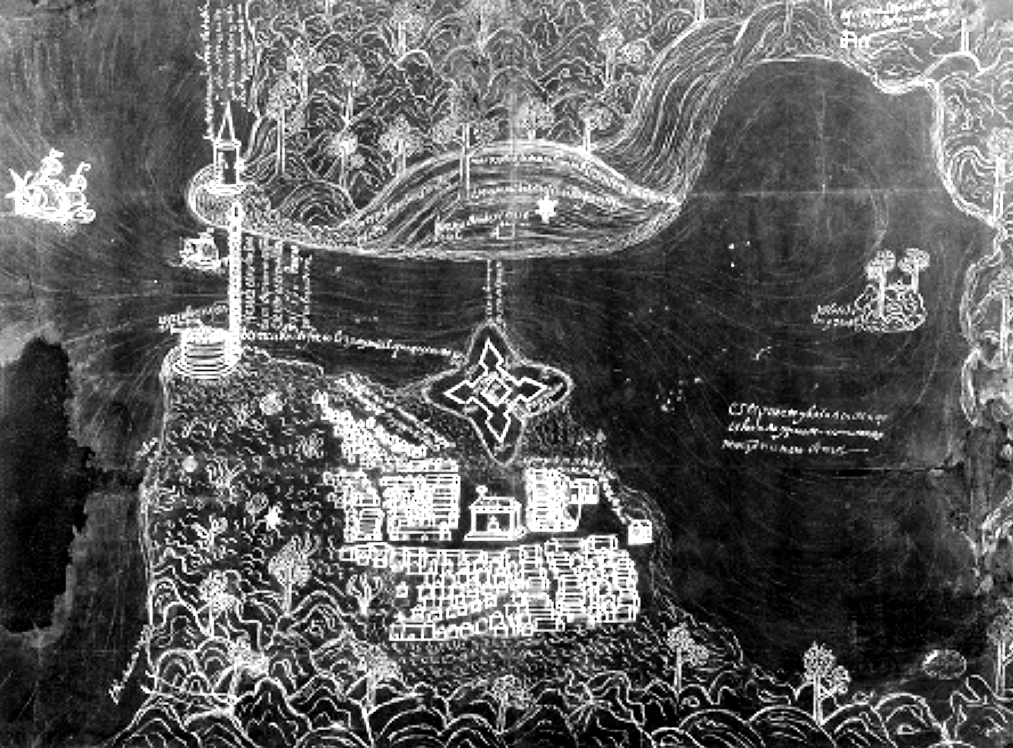
Morro castle and La Punta protected the entrance of the harbor with a chain strung out across the water, known as the boom defense. Drawing by Francisco Calvillo, 1576

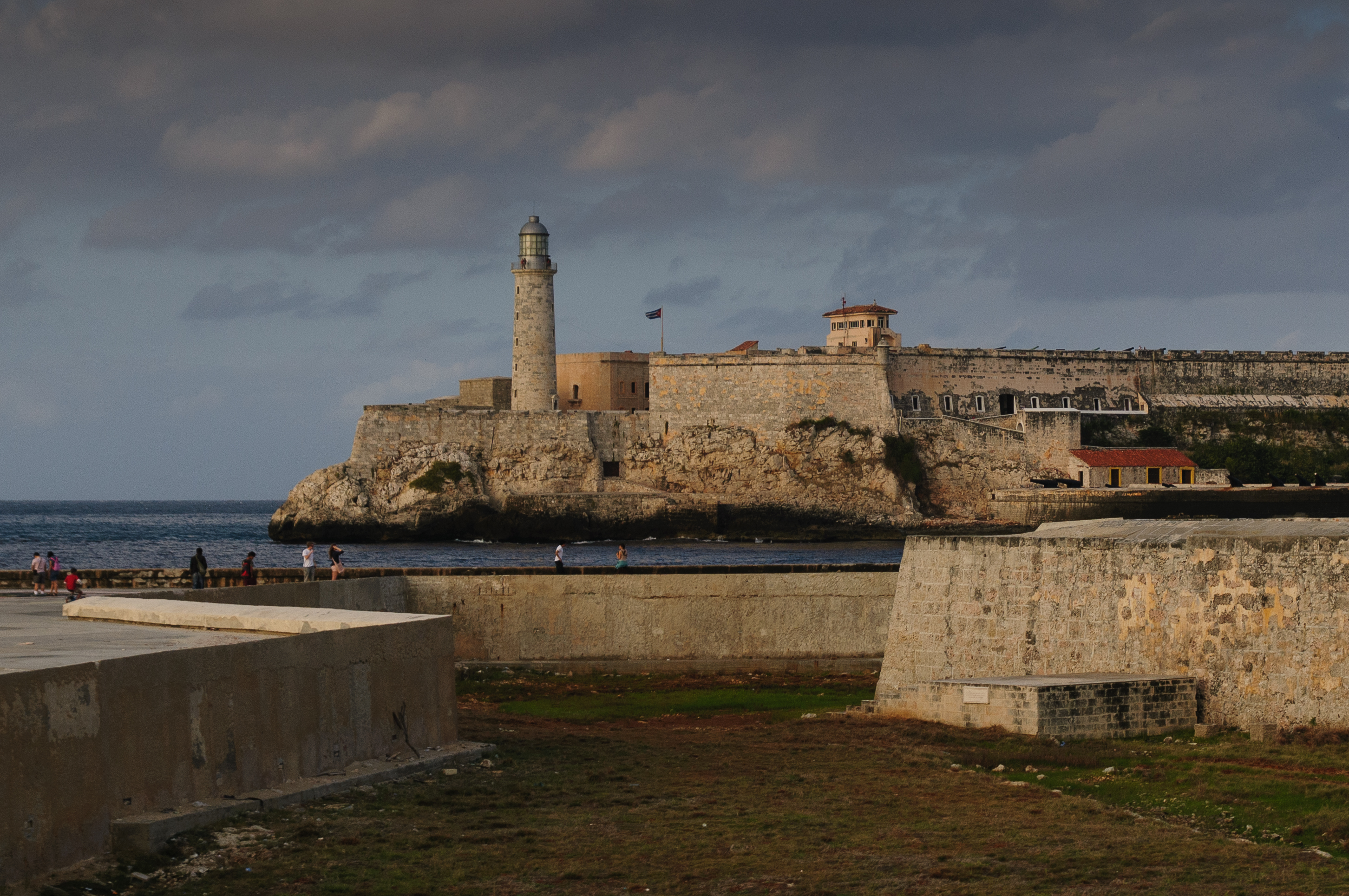

== See also ==
- List of buildings in Havana
- La Cabaña
- Batería de la de la Reina
- Torreón de San Lázaro
- Santa Clara Battery
- Malecón, Havana
