= Punta (disambiguation) =

Punta is a form of Garinagu music.

Punta may also refer to:

- Punta, Spanish for "point" or promontory, is a part of many Spanish toponyms
- Punta (butterfly), a genus of grass skipper butterfly
- Punta rock, a rock version of Ppunta music
- Punta, Calamba, a barangay in Calamba, Philippines
- The modern name of Actium, an ancient town in western Greece
- Punta, a town in the municipality Umag in Croatia

== See also ==
- La Punta (disambiguation)
- Ponta (disambiguation)
- - includes many geographical locations
- Punt (disambiguation)
