= Battista Antonelli =

Italian engineer (1547–1616)

Battista Antonelli (or Bautista) (1547–1616) was an Italy military engineer from a prestigious family of military engineers in the service of the Habsburg monarchs of Austria and Spain. He is credited with designing fortresses in Spanish colonial cities in the Caribbean, including Cartagena de Indias in Colombia, Havana in Cuba, and San Juan Bautista in Puerto Rico.

== Life ==
Antonelli was born in Gatteo in Romagna, and entered the service of Philip II of Spain in 1570, working with his older brother on projects in Oran, Algeria and Spain. In 1581 Antonelli was commissioned by the king to build a fortress along the Straits of Magellan, to protect this vital sea lane from attacks by English privateers. The project, under the command of Pedro Sarmiento de Gamboa and Diego Flores Valdez, was a complete failure, founding a short-lived settlement named Rey Don Felipe (later called Port Famine), without any fortifications. Antonelli returned to Spain, ill and disillusioned. He was convinced, however, to take a second commission in 1586 to build fortifications for the city of Cartagena in Colombia. Using the latest military technology of the time, he designed the city's renowned defenses, the San Felipe de Barajas Castle, the San Sebastián de Pastelillo Fort and the San Fernando Fort.

Antonelli then sailed for Panama where he recommended the abandonment of Nombre de Dios in favor of Portobelo. At Panama la Vieja at the Pacific coast he developed a plan for a fortification of the town, which was never realized. He then set sail for Havana. In Havana he designed the fortifications which culminate at the fortress of Castillo de los Tres Reyes del Morro. From there he returned to Spain. On his second voyage in 1558, he landed in Puerto Rico, designing Castillo San Felipe del Morro in Old San Juan.

After several more journeys to the Caribbean, Antonelli settled in Spain, working on fortresses in Gibraltar and in other places. He died in Spain in 1616 after having one of the most illustrious careers in military architecture in the New World. His brother Giovanni Battista Antonelli was also a military engineer, born in Italy at Gatteo in Romagna, and died in Toledo, Spain, in 1588. His most important works were a series of watchtowers along the coast of the Mediterranean Sea in Spain.

== Forts designed by Antonelli ==
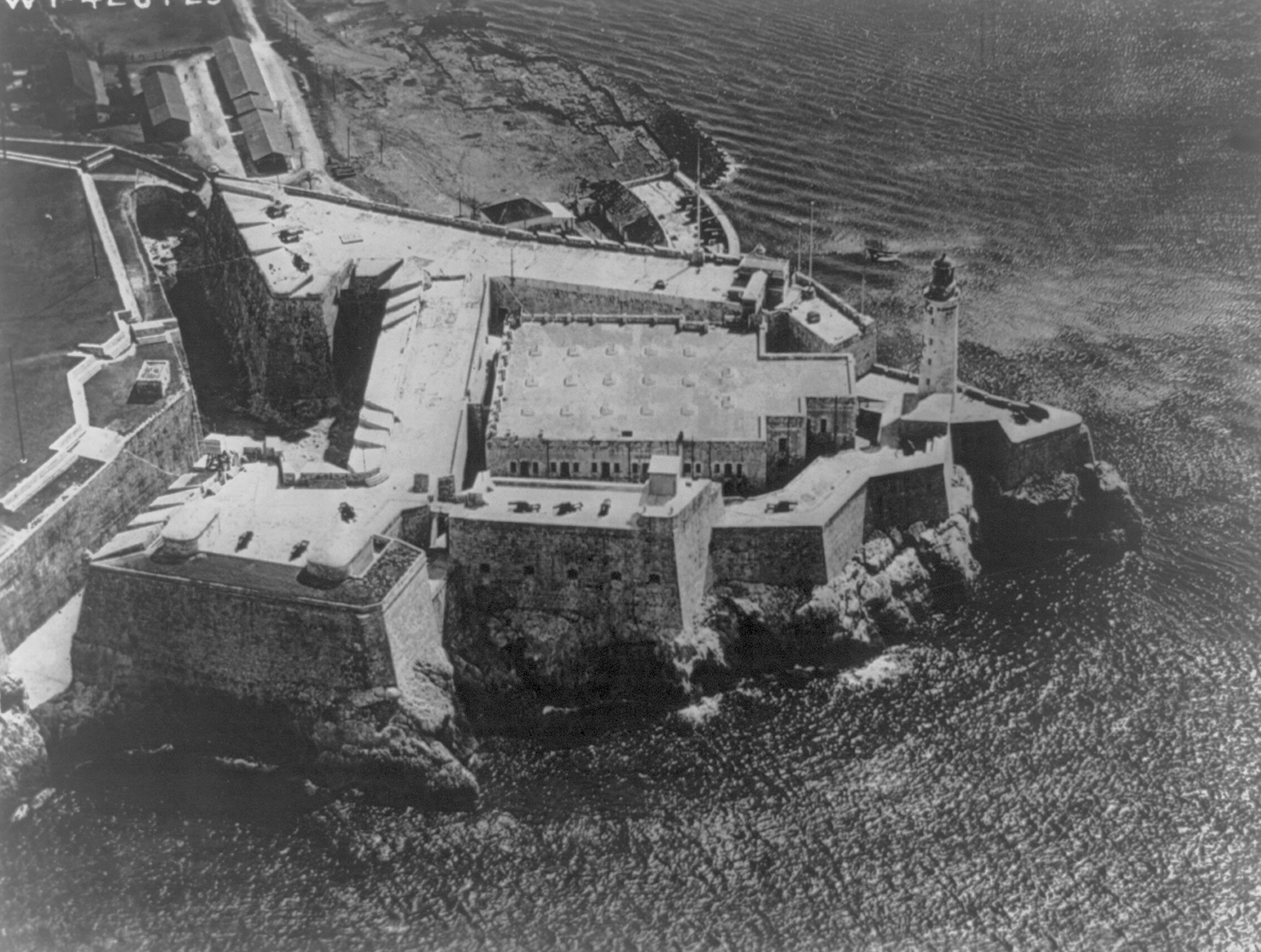
Castillo de los Tres Reyes Del Morro in Havana, Cuba

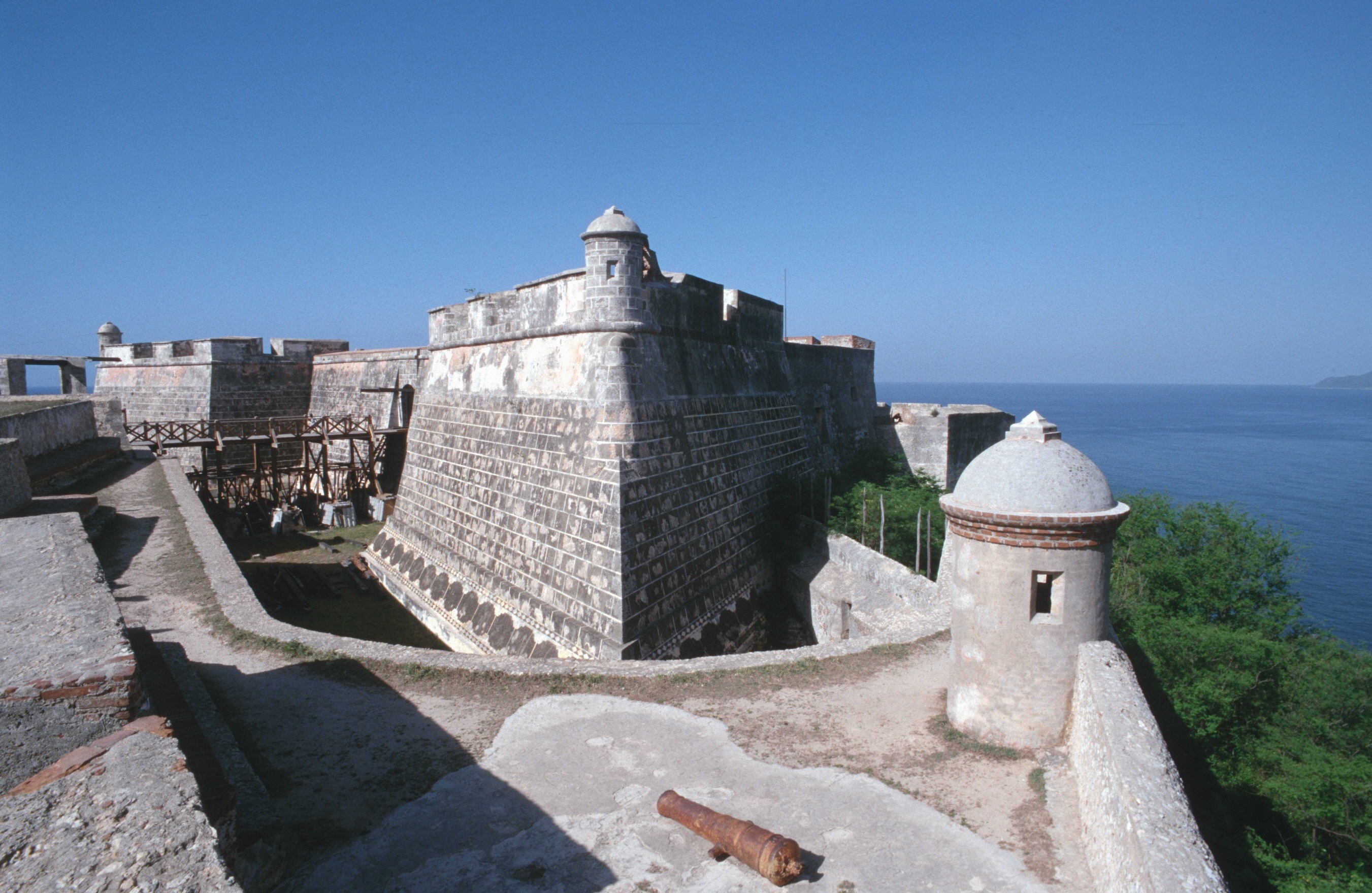
Castillo de San Pedro de la Roca in Santiago de Cuba, Cuba

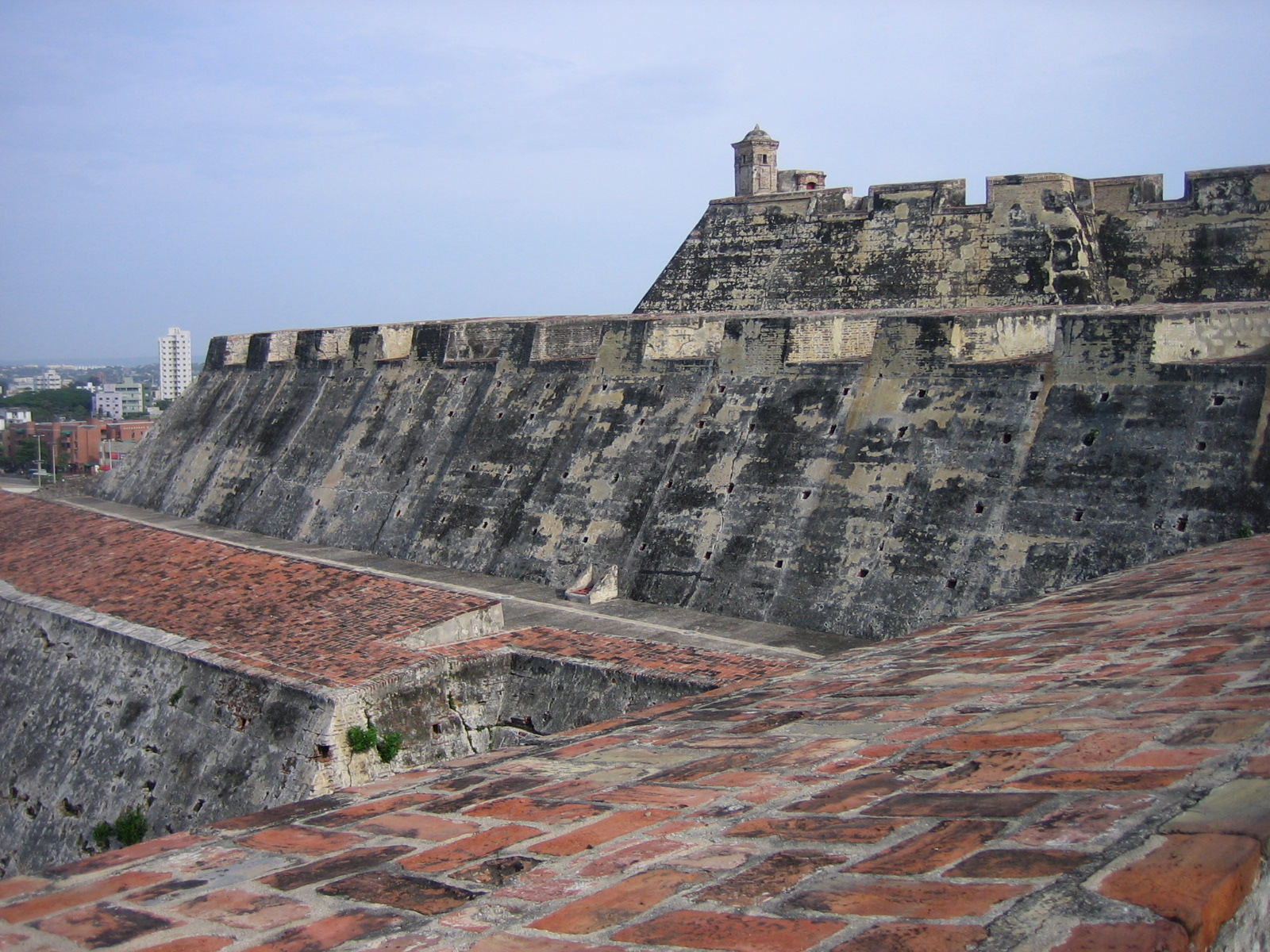
San Felipe de Barajas Fortress in Cartagena, Colombia

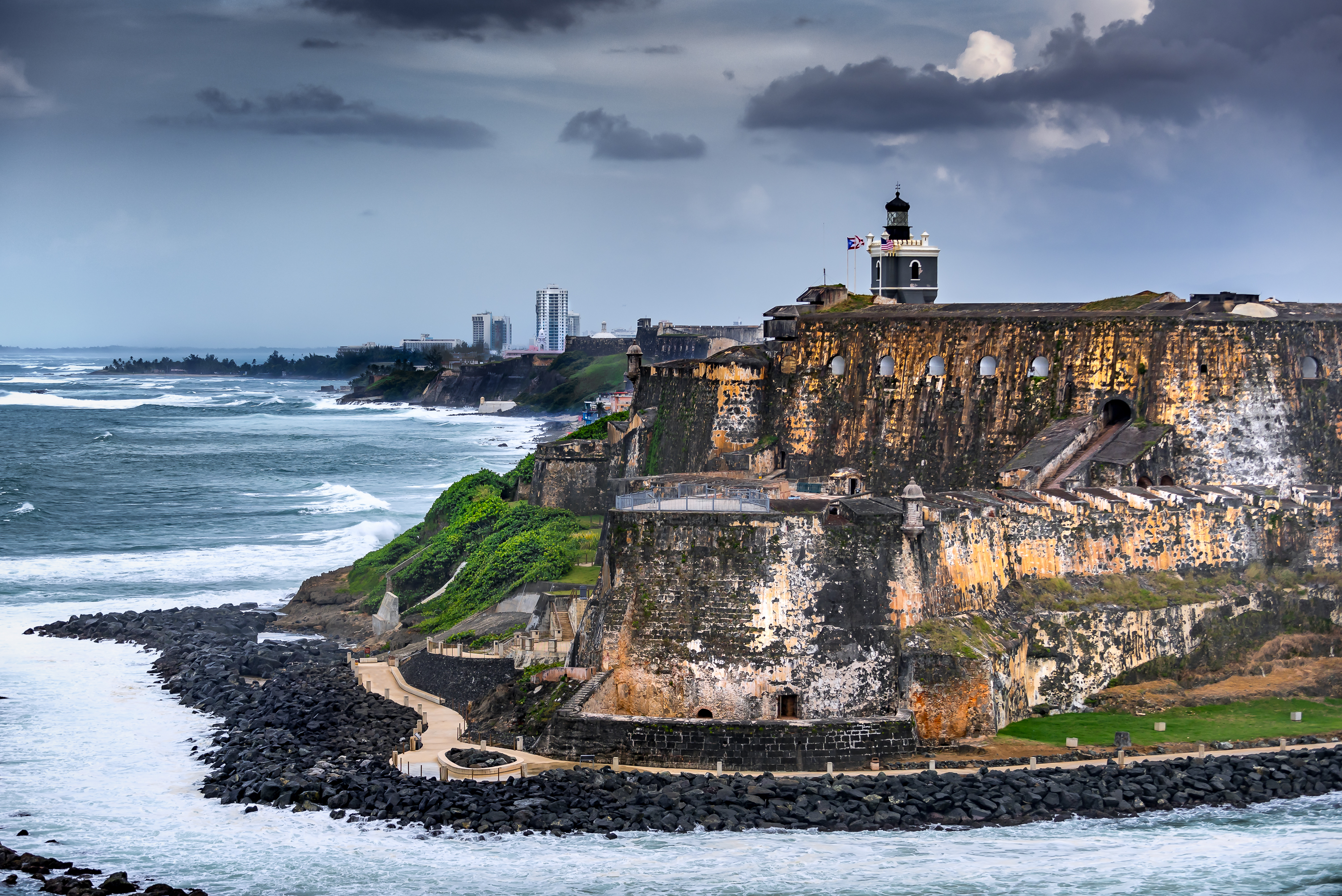
Castillo San Felipe del Morro in San Juan, Puerto Rico
