= Ponta =

Ponta may refer to: Ponta, Portuguese for "point" or promontory, is a part of many Portuguese and Brazilian toponyms:

- Ponta, Texas
- Ponta Grossa, a city in Brazil
- Ponta Pelada Airport, an airport in Brazil
- Ponta Porã International Airport, the airport serving Ponta Porã, Brazil
- Ponta Porã, a municipality in Brazil
- Victor Ponta (born 1972), Romanian politician
- Shuichi Murakami (1951–2021), Japanese drummer nicknamed "Ponta"

== See also ==
- Ponta Cabinet (disambiguation)
- Ponta Delgada (disambiguation)
- Punta (disambiguation)
- - includes many geographical locations
