= Punta Delgada =

Punta Delgada may refer to:

- Punta Delgada, Argentina, a small settlement on the Valdes Peninsula
- Punta Delgada, Chile, a small town in Magallanes Province
- Punta Delgada, Spain, a headland on the island of Alegranza, Canary Islands

== See also ==
- Ponta Delgada (Azores), sometimes misspelled Punta Delgada
- Ponta Delgada (disambiguation)
