= Giovanni Battista Antonelli =

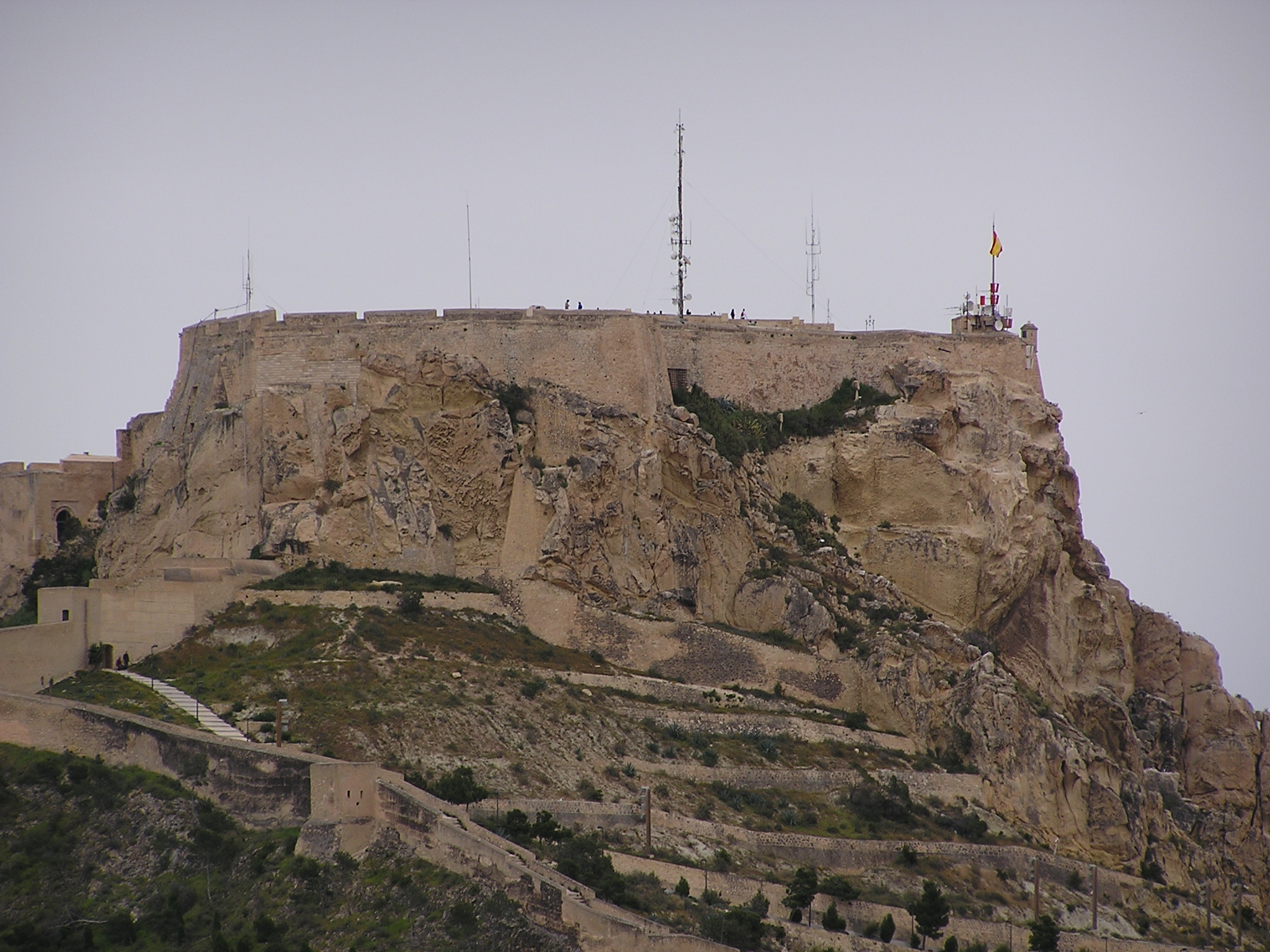
Santa Barbara Fortress. Alicante (Spain)

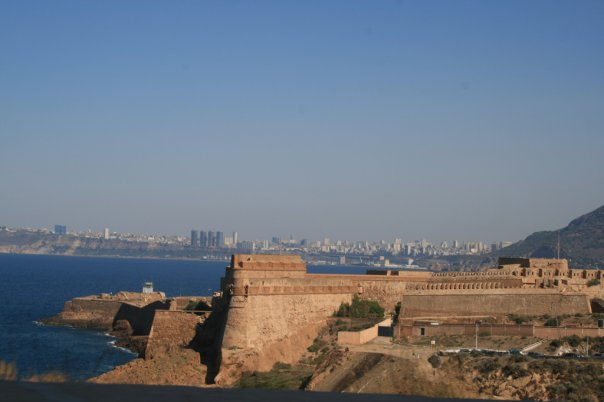
Fortress of Mazalquivir (Algeria)

Giovanni Battista Antonelli (Gatteo of Romagna, 1527 - Toledo, 1588) was a military engineer born in Italy and died in Toledo Spain in 1588. His most important works was a series of watchtowers along the coast of Mediterranean Sea in Spain. His brother Battista Antonelli was also a military engineer.

== Biography ==
He designed and built some military fortifications on the Mediterranean coast of the Iberian Peninsula for Spain during the second half of the sixteenth century.

In 1568, King Philip II of Spain had given to the noble Vespasian Gonzaga, mandated to carry out a plan of defense of the Mediterranean coast of Spain.

For that, similarly, had already done in the Kingdom of Sicily in 1547 and 1552 with Ferramolino and Pietro del Grado, the nobleman was accompanied by an expert, the Antonelli, derived from inspection and the planned construction of the fortifications of port city of Cartagena, the coast of the Kingdom of Valencia and the African ports of Oran and Mazalquivir.

Within this project of fortification of the coast of Spain and Africa, was built a series of towers along the coast, the coast of the Kingdom of Murcia and Valencia, and was undertaken the reconstruction of the Castle of Santa Barbara overlooking Alicante (Spain) in 1562, the construction of the Benidorm Palace and the Tower of Santa Faz in Alicante in 1575 and the reservoir of Tibi (1580). In addition, the walls were built to protect Peñíscola.

From 1580 he devoted himself to the study of the navigability of the river Tagus from Lisbon to Toledo, a project that never became a reality (there is a satirical novel of Ricardo Sanchez Candelas, who took over the project entitled: "Navigated only his dreams".

In the early 1580s he participated in the designs of fortifications planned to be built in the Strait of Magellan to prevent the entry of non-Spanish ships to the Pacific from the Atlantic. The Spanish settlement attempt of the strait had however by 1587 turned into failure with only a few colonist surviving starvation and disease.
