= Anne Lennox =

Anne (or Ann) Lennox may refer to:

- Anne Lennox, Duchess of Richmond (1671–1722)
- Anne van Keppel, Countess of Albemarle (1703–1789), born Anne Lennox
- Lady Anne Lennox (1726–1727), infant daughter of Charles Lennox, 2nd Duke of Richmond, and his wife Sarah
- Annie Lennox (born 1954), Scottish singer
