= Frederick Keppel (bishop) =

Bishop in the Church of England (1728–1777)

The Right Reverend Frederick Keppel
- Bishop of Exeter
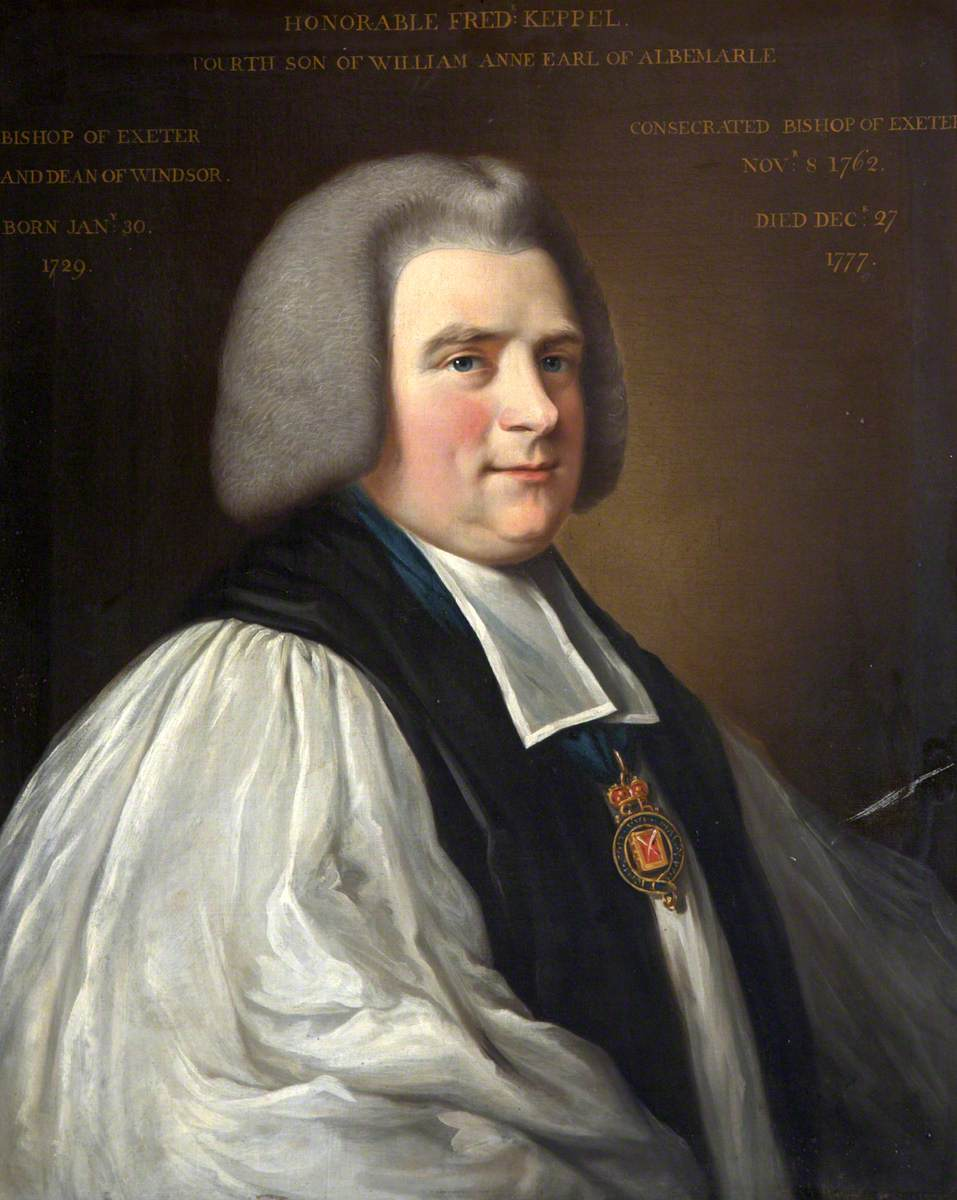
- Diocese: Diocese of Exeter
- In office: 1762–1777
- Predecessor: George Lavington
- Successor: John Ross
- Other post: Dean of Windsor (1765–1777)

Personal details
- Born: 19 January 1728
- Died: 27 December 1777 (aged 49)
- Denomination: Anglican
- Parents: Willem van Keppel, 2nd Earl of Albemarle; Lady Anne Lennox
- Spouse: Laura Walpole (married 1758)
- Education: Westminster School
- Alma mater: Christ Church, Oxford

Frederick Keppel (19 January 1728 – 27 December 1777) was a Church of England clergyman, Bishop of Exeter.

== Background ==
Keppel was the fifth and fourth surviving son of Willem van Keppel, 2nd Earl of Albemarle and his wife Lady Anne Lennox, daughter of Charles Lennox, 1st Duke of Richmond, illegitimate son of King Charles II. His older brothers were George Keppel, 3rd Earl of Albemarle, who had succeeded their father as earl, Augustus Keppel, 1st Viscount Keppel, an admiral, raised to the peerage in his own right and the politician and military commander Hon. William Keppel.

He entered Westminster School in 1743, and matriculated at Christ Church, Oxford, on 26 June 1747, graduating B.A. in 1752, M.A. in 1754, and D.D., by diploma, on 19 October 1762.

== Career ==
After his graduation, Keppel was appointed Canon of the Eleventh Stall at St George's Chapel, Windsor in 1754, acting as chaplain first to King George II of Great Britain and then to the latter's son King George III the United Kingdom. He was consecrated as Bishop of Exeter in 1762 and became Dean of Windsor as well as consequently Register of the Order of the Garter three years later, holding all three posts until his death in 1777.

== Family ==
On 13 September 1758, he married Laura Walpole, sister of Maria, Duchess of Gloucester and Edinburgh and eldest daughter of the Hon Edward Walpole, a son of Robert Walpole, 1st Earl of Orford. They had four children, three daughters and one son:

- Anna Maria (d. 1836), who married Lt.-Gen. William Stapleton. They had one son, Lt.-Col. John Horace Stapleton.
- Frederick (12 Nov 1762 – 12 April 1830), who married Louisa Clive, daughter George Clive MP. They had three sons.
- Laura (14 Mar 1765 – 29 June 1798), who married George FitzRoy, 2nd Baron Southampton. They had two daughters, of which one, Georgiana, married her cousin Lt.-Col. John Stapleton.
- Charlotte Augusta (1771–1852), who married Robert Foote, Gentleman of the King's Privy Chamber and High Sheriff of Kent. They had no known issue.

Keppel died in 1777 and his wife survived him until 1813. His daughter Laura was wife of George FitzRoy, 2nd Baron Southampton.

== Arms ==
Coat of arms of Frederick Keppel
Escutcheon Gules, three escallops argent, in chief centre point a martlet of the second.

Church of England titles
Preceded by George Lavington	Bishop of Exeter; 1762–1777	Succeeded by John Ross
Preceded by Peniston Booth	Dean of Windsor; 1765–1777	Succeeded by John Harley
