= Augustus Keppel, 1st Viscount Keppel =

Royal Navy officer and politician (1725–1786)

Admiral The Right Honourable The Viscount Keppel PC
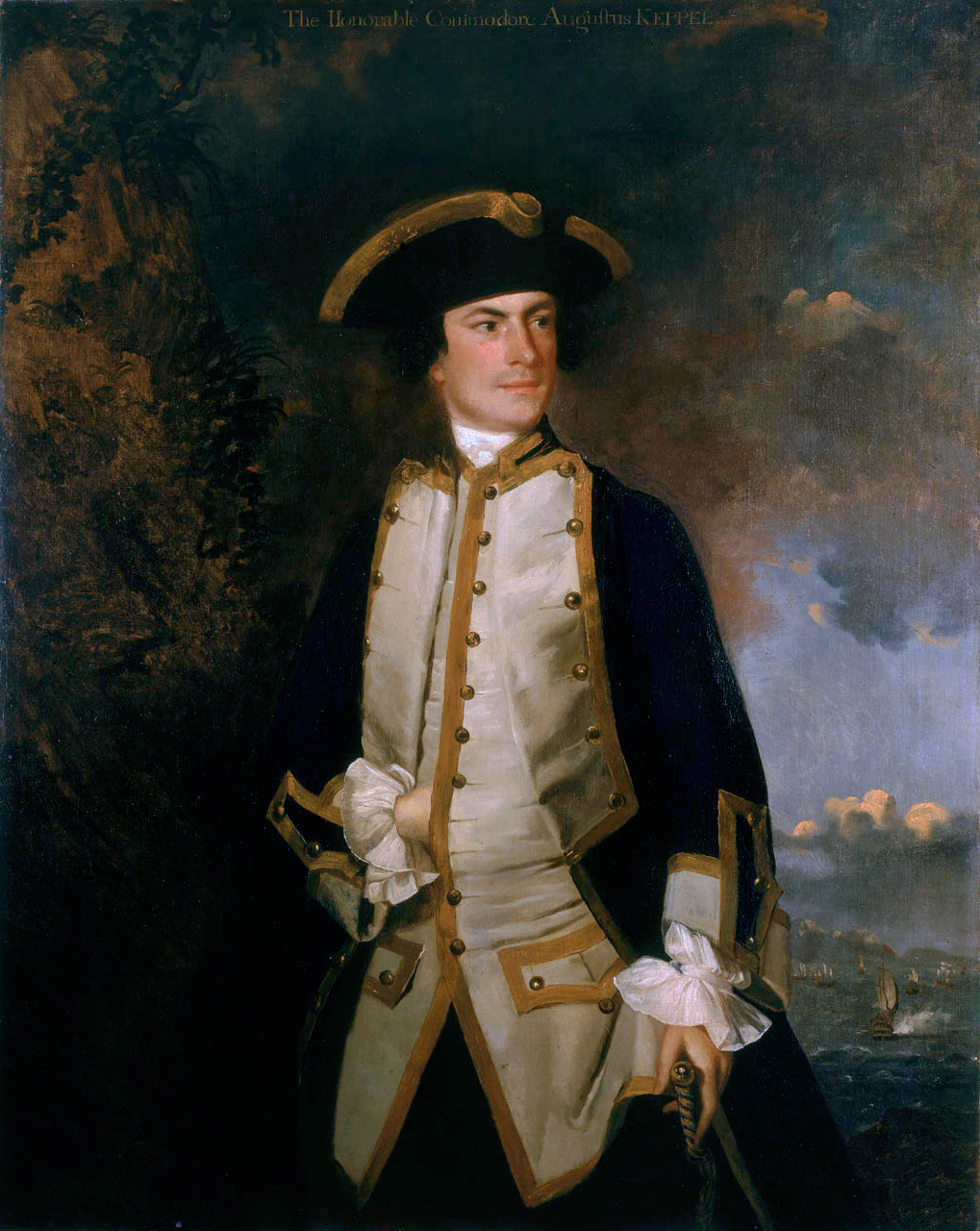
- Portrait of Augustus Keppel by Sir Joshua Reynolds, 1749
- Born: 25 April 1725
- Died: 2 October 1786 (aged 61); Elveden Hall, Elveden, Suffolk, England
- Military career
- Allegiance: Great Britain
- Branch: Royal Navy
- Service years: 1735–1786
- Rank: Admiral of the White
- Commands: HMS Wolf; HMS Greyhound; HMS Sapphire; HMS Maidstone; HMS Anson; HMS Centurion; Mediterranean Fleet; North American Station; HMS Swiftsure; HMS Torbay; HMS Valiant; Jamaica Station; Lord Commissioner of the Admiralty; Channel Fleet; First Lord of the Admiralty
- Conflicts: War of Jenkins' Ear/Austrian Succession; George Anson's voyage around the world; Seven Years' War; Raid on Rochefort; Raid on St Malo; Capture of Gorée; Battle of Quiberon Bay; Capture of Belle Île; Siege of Havana; American War of Independence; Battle of Ushant (1778)

Admiral of the White Augustus Keppel, 1st Viscount Keppel, PC (25 April 1725 – 2 October 1786) was a Royal Navy officer and politician who sat in the House of Commons from 1755 to 1782. He saw action in command of various ships, including the fourth-rate Maidstone, during the War of the Austrian Succession. He went on to serve as Commodore on the North American Station and then Commander-in-Chief, Jamaica Station during the Seven Years' War. After that he served as Senior Naval Lord and then Commander-in-Chief of the Channel Fleet.

During the American War of Independence Keppel came into a notorious dispute with Sir Hugh Palliser over Palliser's conduct as his second-in-command at the inconclusive Battle of Ushant in July 1778; the dispute led to Keppel and Palliser facing courts martial, which acquitted both of them. During the final years of the American War of Independence Keppel served as First Lord of the Admiralty.

== Early life ==
A member of a leading Whig aristocratic family (which had come to England with William of Orange in 1688), Augustus Keppel was the second son of Willem van Keppel, 2nd Earl of Albemarle and, Anne van Keppel, a daughter of the 1st Duke of Richmond (himself an illegitimate son of King Charles II). Educated briefly at Westminster School, Keppel went to sea at the age of ten, and had already five years of service to his credit when he was appointed to Centurion and sent with Lord Anson round the world in 1740. He had a very narrow escape from being killed at the capture of Paita (13 November 1741) and was promoted to acting lieutenant in March 1742. Also on this voyage, he made friends with John Campbell, and lost many of his teeth to the scurvy prevalent on the voyage. After their return from the circumnavigation, in November 1744, he was promoted to be commander and post-captain of the 14-gun sloop Wolf. He transferred to the sixth-rate Greyhound in December 1744, to the fifth-rate Saphire in February 1745 and the fourth-rate Maidstone in November 1745. In June 1747 he ran his ship, the Maidstone, ashore near Belleisle while chasing a French vessel, but was honourably acquitted by a court martial, and reappointed to another command, the fourth-rate Anson. He was actively employed throughout the rest of the War of the Austrian Succession, until peace was signed in 1748.

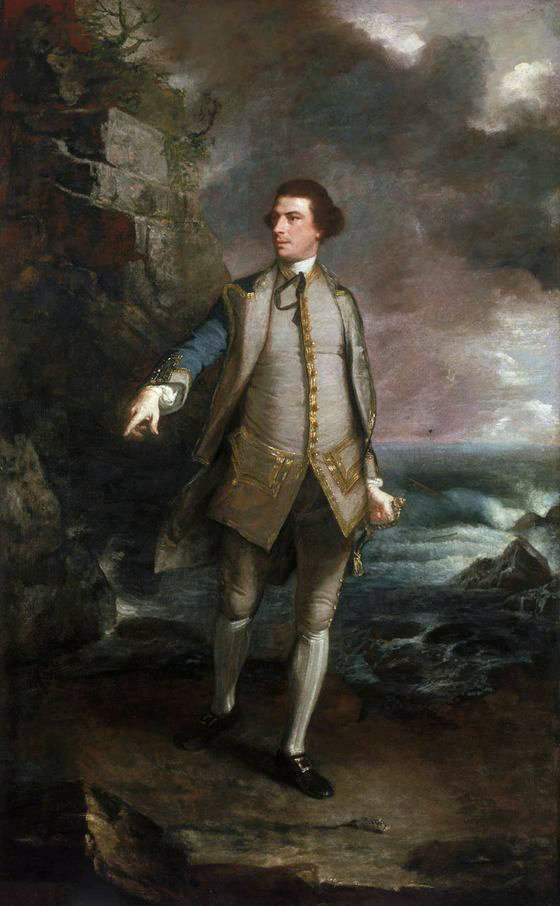
c. 1752 portrait of Keppel by Joshua Reynolds, in a pose similar to the Apollo Belvedere.

Early in 1749, he was introduced by Lord Edgecombe to Sir Joshua Reynolds. When, on 11 May 1749, Keppel sailed from Plymouth to the Mediterranean, as Commodore commanding the Mediterranean Fleet, (with his pennant in his old ship HMS Centurion intending to persuade the Dey of Algiers to restrain the piratical operations of his subjects) Reynolds travelled with him as far as Menorca and there painted the first of his 6 portraits of Keppel, (Note: One of the 6, belonging originally to Edmund Burke, is now in the National Gallery where there is also one by him of Keppel's mother) along with others of officers of the British garrison there. (Note: Reynolds then stayed on the island for the rest of 1749 before leaving for Rome, where he stayed 2 years) Keppel concluded an agreement with the Dey of Algiers which protected British commerce. After negotiating treaties at Tripoli and Tunis, Keppel returned to England in July 1751.

== Seven Years' War ==
During the Seven Years' War he saw constant service. He served as commodore on the North American Station with his broad pennant in the fourth-rate Norwich from 1751 to 1755. He was on the coast of France in 1756 and was detached on an expedition to conquer Gorée, a French island off the west coast of Africa in 1758. His ship, Torbay (74), was the first to get into action in the Battle of Quiberon Bay in November 1759.

In 1757 he had formed part of the court martial which had condemned Admiral of the Blue John Byng, but was active among those who endeavoured to secure a pardon for him; but neither he nor those who had acted with him could produce any serious reason why the sentence should not be carried out. In March 1761, Keppel transferred to the third-rate HMS Valiant and was put in command of a squadron to reduce Belle Isle, which was successfully completed in June 1761.

=== Havana expedition ===
When Spain joined France in 1762 he was sent as second in command with Sir George Pocock in the British expedition against Cuba which took Havana. His health suffered from the fever which carried off an immense proportion of the soldiers and sailors. The £25,000 of prize money which he received freed him from the unpleasant position of "younger son of a family ruined by the extravagance of his father".

=== Achievement of flag rank ===
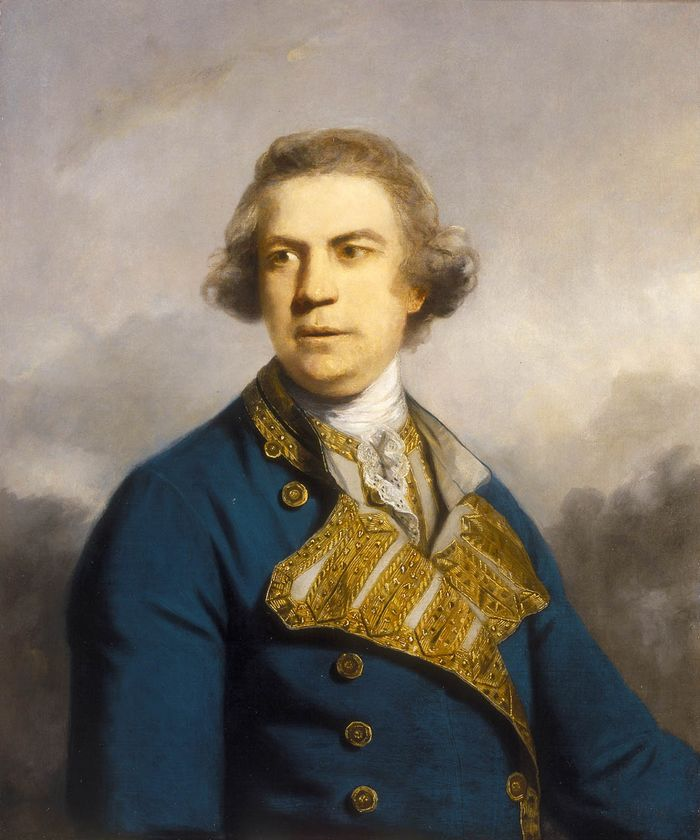
1765 portrait of Keppel wearing a flag officer's undress uniform by Reynolds

Promoted to Rear-Admiral of the Blue on 21 October 1762, Keppel became commander-in-chief of the Jamaica Station late in the year. He was a member of the Board of Admiralty in the First Rockingham ministry from July 1765 and was Senior Naval Lord in the Chatham ministry from September 1766 until leaving the Admiralty Board in December 1766. In 1768 he acquired Elveden Hall in Suffolk. He was promoted to Rear-Admiral of the Red on 18 October 1770, and Vice-Admiral of the Blue on 24 October. When the Falklands Crisis of 1770 occurred in November 1770 he was to have commanded the fleet to be sent against Spain, but a settlement was reached, and he had no occasion to hoist his flag.

== American War of Independence ==
The most prominent period of his life belongs to the opening years of the American War of Independence. Keppel, who was promoted to Vice-Admiral of the White on 31 March 1775, was a strong supporter of the Whig connection, led by the Marquess of Rockingham and the Duke of Richmond. The Whigs were then excluded from power by George III. As a member of Parliament, in which he had a seat for Chichester from 1755 until 1761, Windsor from 1761 until 1780, and then for Surrey from 1780 to 1782, Keppel was a Whig partisan, hostile to the King's Friends. The Whigs believed that the king's ministers, and in particular Lord Sandwich, then First Lord of the Admiralty, were capable of any villainy. When Keppel was promoted to Admiral of the Blue on 29 January 1778 (having been earlier promoted to Vice-Admiral of the Red on 3 February 1776) and appointed to command the Western Squadron, the main fleet prepared against France, he thought the First Lord would be glad for him to be defeated.

Prior to 1778 Keppel failed to persuade Sandwich to ignore technical difficulties and "copper sheath only a few ships"; he was later possibly unfairly to make political capital out of this in The London Magazine, March 1781. He had remarked that coppering "gave additional strength to the navy" and he reproached Lord Sandwich with having "refused to sheath only a few ships with copper" at his request, when he had since ordered the whole navy to be sheathed. The lack of coppering the Navy was one of the key reasons leading to Britain losing the Thirteen Colonies.

One of Keppel's subordinate admirals was Sir Hugh Palliser, a member of the Admiralty Board, a member of parliament, and in Keppel's opinion responsible with his colleagues for the bad state of the Royal Navy. The battle which Keppel fought with the French on 27 July 1778 (the First Battle of Ushant) ended badly. Reasons included Keppel's own management, but also the failure of Palliser to obey orders. Keppel became convinced that he had been deliberately betrayed.

== Keppel–Palliser affair ==
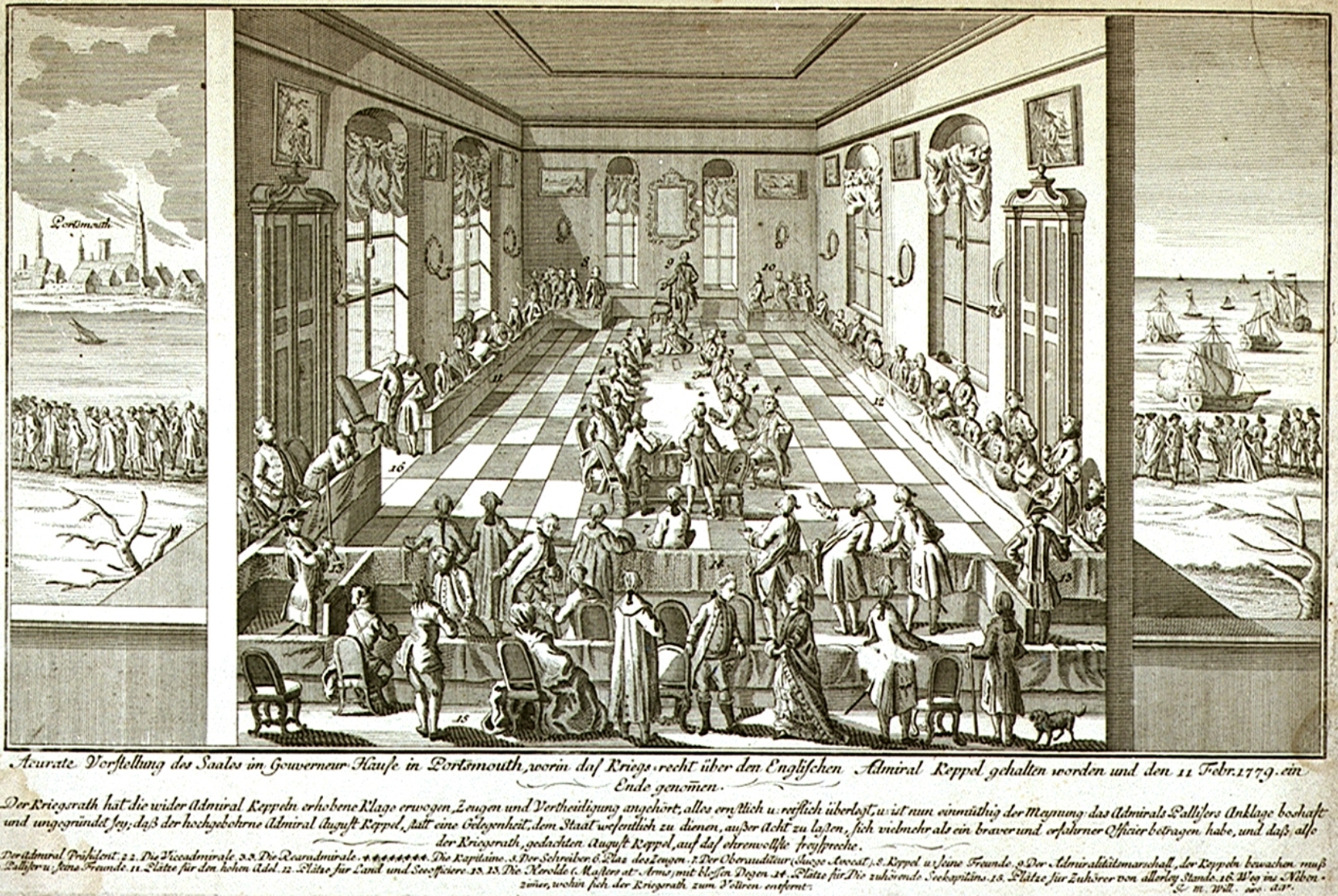
Keppel's court-martial at the Governor's House, Portsmouth

Though Keppel praised Palliser in his public despatch, he attacked him in private. The Whig press, with Keppel's friends, began a campaign of calumny. The ministerial papers answered in the same style, and each side accused the other of deliberate treason. The result was a scandalous series of scenes in Parliament and of courts martial. Keppel was first tried and acquitted, and then Palliser was also tried and acquitted. Keppel left his post in March 1779. A column was built in the late 18th century to commemorate his acquittal, commissioned by Charles Watson-Wentworth, 2nd Marquess of Rockingham and designed by John Carr.

== Political career ==
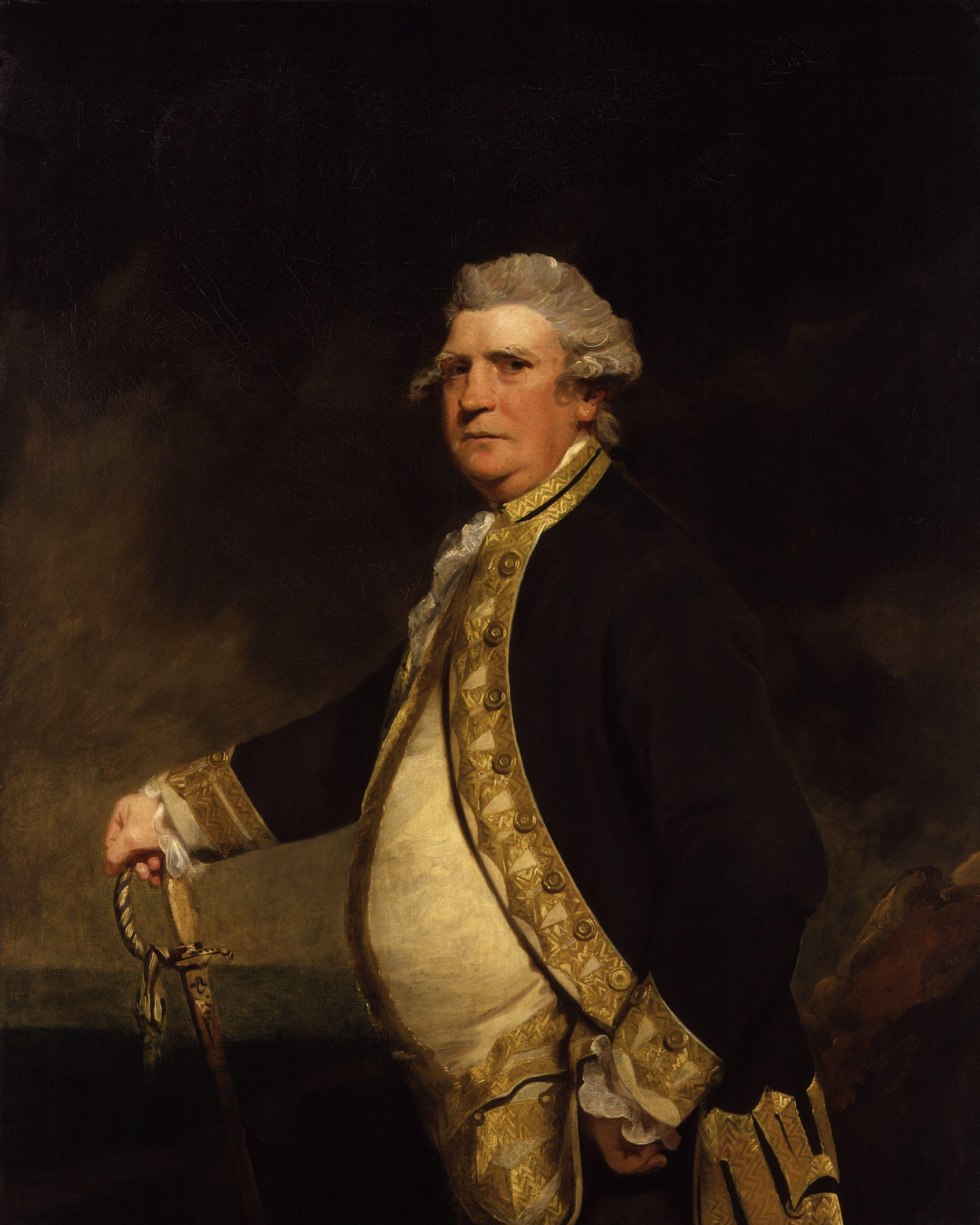
1779 portrait of Keppel by Reynolds

Following the fall of the North ministry on 27 March 1782 Keppel became First Lord of the Admiralty, was raised to the peerage as Viscount Keppel, of Elveden in the County of Suffolk, and sworn of the Privy Council. He was promoted to his final rank of Admiral of the White in April 1782. Keppel's career in office was not distinguished, and he broke with his old political associates by resigning as a protest against the Peace of Paris. He finally discredited himself by joining the Coalition ministry formed by Lord North and Charles James Fox, and with its fall disappeared from public life in December 1783. Keppel died unmarried on 2 October 1786. Edmund Burke, who regarded him with great affection, said that "he had something high in his nature, and that it was a wild stock of pride on which the tenderest of all hearts had grafted the milder virtues". The peerage died with him.

== In popular culture ==
Keppel appears in Patrick O'Brian's 1956 novel The Golden Ocean as a midshipman aboard the Centurion. He is often the comic relief, winding up bald and toothless due to the various privations of the voyage.

== Legacy ==
Great Keppel Island and Keppel Bay in Australia, and Keppel Island in the Falkland Islands are named after Keppel. Keppel's Column in Rotherham was constructed to mark his acquittal.

== Sources ==
- Barry, Quintin (2022). From Ushant to Gibraltar: The Channel Fleet 1778-1783. From Reason to Revolution. Warwick: Helion & Company. ISBN 978-1-915070-39-5.
- Chisholm, Hugh, ed. (1911). "Keppel, Augustus Keppel, Viscount" . Encyclopædia Britannica. Vol. 15 (11th ed.). Cambridge University Press. pp. 751–752.
- Cundall, Frank (1915). Historic Jamaica. West India Committee.
- Laughton, John Knox (1892). "Keppel, Augustus" . In Lee, Sidney (ed.). Dictionary of National Biography. Vol. 31. London: Smith, Elder & Co.
- Rodger, N.A.M. (1979). The Admiralty. Offices of State. Lavenham: T. Dalton Ltd. ISBN 0-900963-94-8.
- Winfield, Rif (2007). British Warships of the Age of Sail 1714–1792: Design, Construction, Careers and Fates. Seaforth. ISBN 978-1-84415-700-6.

Parliament of Great Britain
Preceded by John Page; Viscount Bury	Member of Parliament for Chichester; 1755–1761; With: John Page	Succeeded by John Page; Lord George Henry Lennox
Preceded by Henry Fox; John Fitzwilliam	Member of Parliament for Windsor; 1761–1780; With: John Fitzwilliam 1761–1768; Lord George Beauclerk 1768; Richard Tonson 1768–1772; John Hussey-Montagu 1772–1780	Succeeded by John Hussey-Montagu; Peniston Portlock Powney
Preceded by Sir Joseph Mawbey; James Scawen	Member of Parliament for Surrey; 1780–1782; With: Sir Joseph Mawbey	Succeeded by Sir Joseph Mawbey; Viscount Althorp
Military offices
Preceded by Sir James Douglas	Commander-in-Chief, Jamaica Station; 1762–1764	Succeeded by William Burnaby
Preceded by Sir Charles Saunders	Senior Naval Lord; September 1766–December 1766	Succeeded by Sir Peircy Brett
Political offices
Preceded by The Earl of Sandwich	First Lord of the Admiralty; 1782–1783	Succeeded by The Viscount Howe
Preceded by The Viscount Howe	First Lord of the Admiralty; 1783	Succeeded by The Viscount Howe
Peerage of Great Britain
New creation	Viscount Keppel; 1782–1786	Extinct
