= Lady Louisa Lennox =

Louisa Lennox is the birthname of:

- Louisa Berkeley, Countess of Berkeley (1694–1716), English noblewoman
- Lady Louisa Conolly (1743–1821), one of the famous Lennox sisters
