= John Ross (bishop of Exeter) =

English bishop (1719–1792)

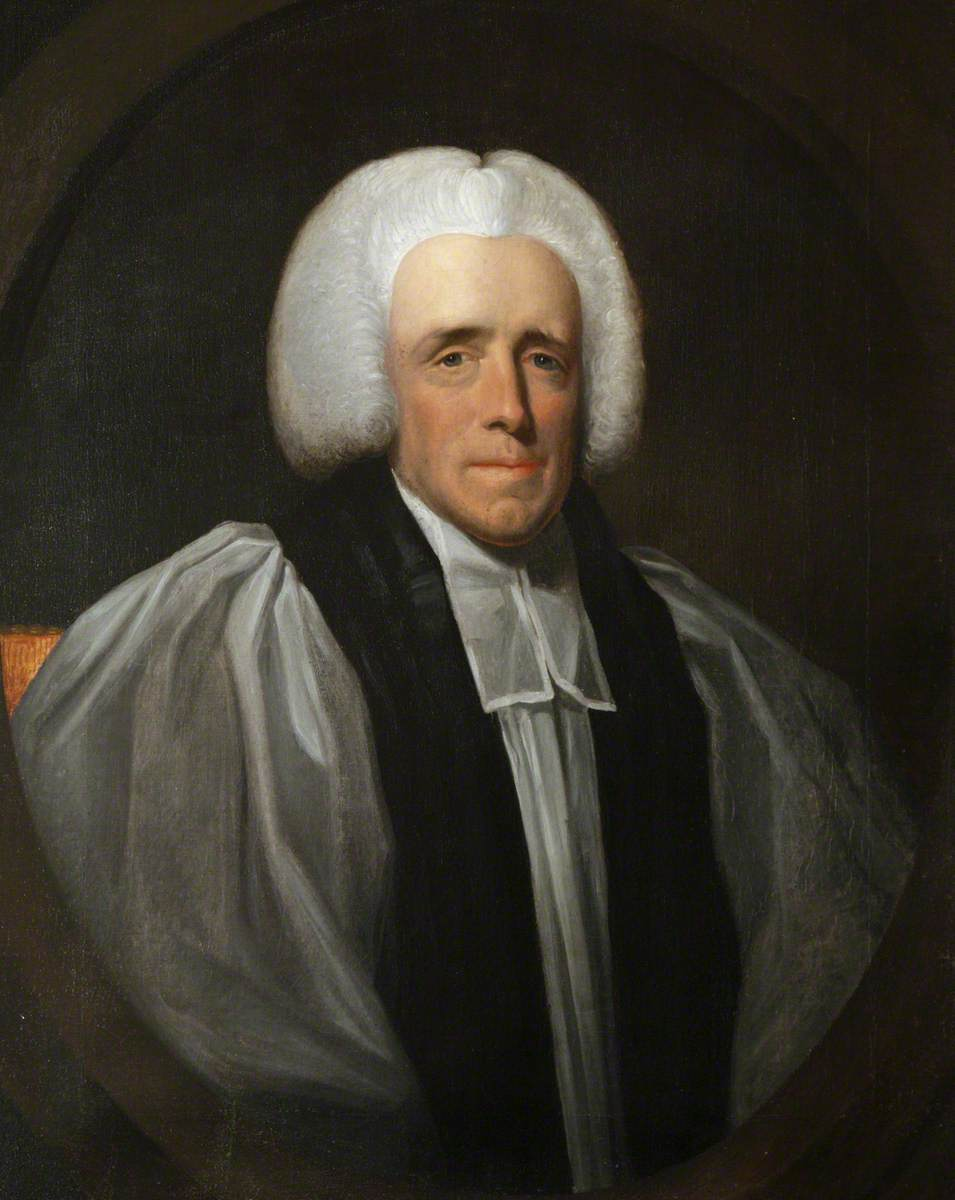
- John Ross by Lemuel Francis Abbott

Bishop of Exeter
- In office 1778-1792
- Preceded by: Frederick Keppel
- Succeeded by: William Buller

Personal details
- Born: 24 or 25 June 1719 Ross, Herefordshire, England
- Died: 14 August 1792 (aged 73) Exeter, Devon, England
- Education: St John's College, Cambridge

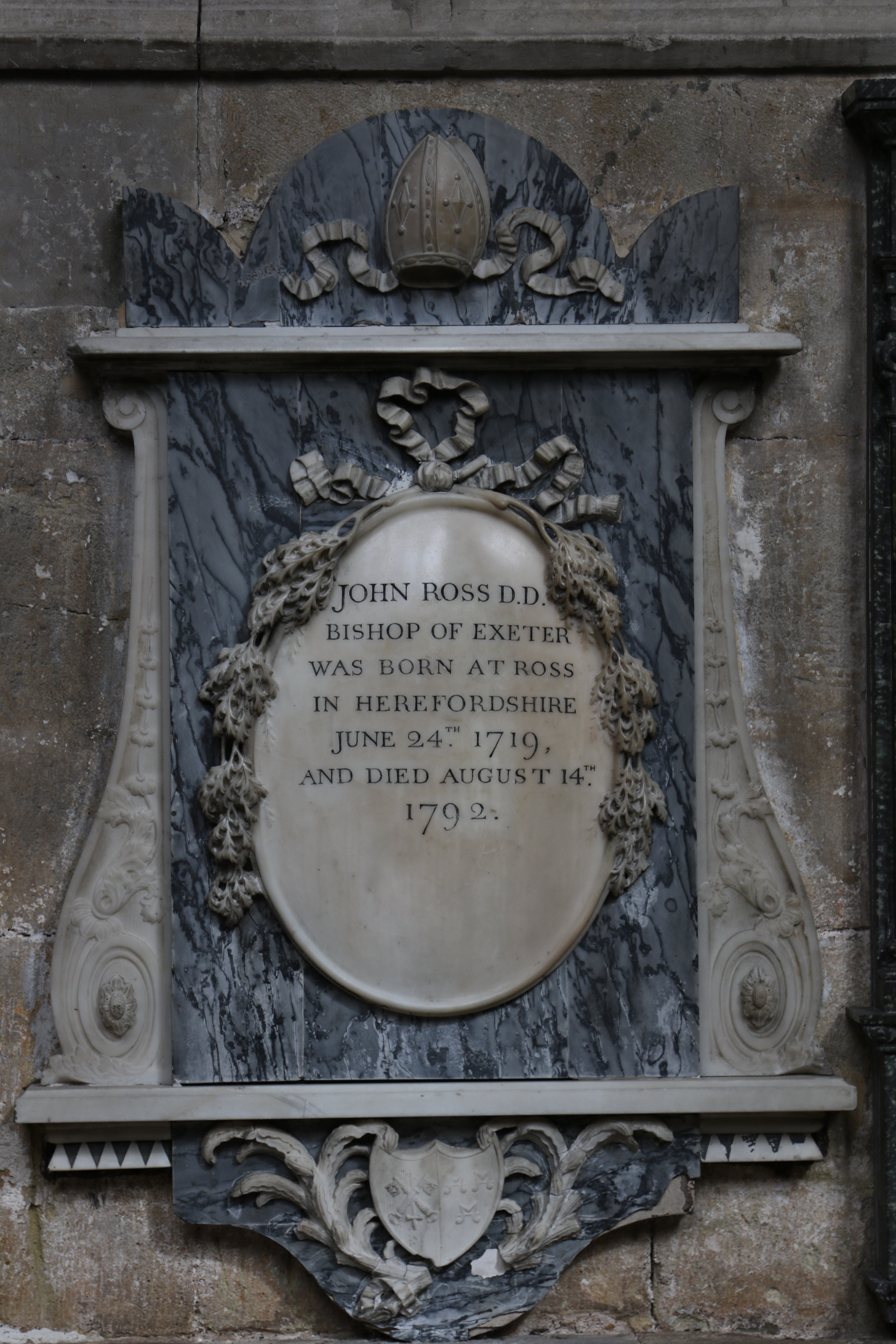
Memorial in Exeter Cathedral

John Ross or Rosse (1719–1792) was an English Bishop of Exeter.

== Life ==
He was born at Ross in Herefordshire, on 24 or 25 June 1719, the only son of John Rosse, attorney in that town. He was educated at the grammar school in Hereford, was admitted a pensioner at St John's College, Cambridge (April 1737), and on the following 22 June became a Somerset scholar of the third foundation at his college. He graduated B.A. 1741, M.A. 1744, B.D. 1751, D.D. 1756, and on 10 July 1744 was incorporated at Oxford. From March 1744 to 1770 he held a fellowship at St. John's, and down to 1768 he discharged college duties.

In 1757 Ross was appointed to the preachership at the Rolls Chapel, although Richard Hurd was a competitor and received the support of William Warburton and Charles Yorke, and in the same year became a king's chaplain. He was elected Fellow of the Royal Society on 23 February 1758. Lord Weymouth, who had been one of his private pupils, gave him in 1760 the benefice of Frome, Somerset, and he retained it until his death; he further received in March 1769 the twelfth canonry in Durham Cathedral. He was consecrated on 25 January 1778 as bishop of Exeter, and held with the bishopric, as was the case with many successive occupants of the see, the archdeaconry of Exeter, a prebendal stall in the cathedral, and the rectory of Shobrooke in Devon. He retained the vicarage of Frome, but resigned the canonry at Durham.

He disapproved of the introduction of Sunday schools, but in a sermon before the House of Lords on 30 January 1779 he advocated an extension of toleration to dissenters. John Wesley attended a service in Exeter Cathedral on Sunday, 18 August 1772, and was much pleased with it; Ross asked him to dinner, which Wesley also enjoyed. For some time before his death his faculties were greatly impaired. He died at the palace, Exeter, on 14 August 1792, and was buried on 18 August in the south aisle of the choir, the place being marked by a flat tombstone and the inscription 'J. R., D.D., 1792.' The bishop left most of his fortune to Miss Eliza Maria Garway, a distant relative; she was stepdaughter of Samuel Collett of Worcester, and afterwards married Sir Nigel Bowyer Gresley of Drakelow, Derbyshire, son of Sir Nigel Gresley, 6th Baronet.

== Works ==
Ross edited in 1749 letters of Cicero. When Jeremiah Markland brought out a volume of 'Remarks on the Epistles of Cicero to Brutus,' and added 'a Dissertation upon Four Orations ascribed to Cicero', Ross published an ironical 'Dissertation in which the Defence of P. Sulla ascribed to Cicero is clearly proved to be spurious after the manner of Mr. Markland.' He was the author of sermons, and revised Richard Polwhele's English Orator; and was a patron to George Ashby.

== Notes ==
Church of England titles
| Preceded by Frederick Keppel | Bishop of Exeter; 1778–1792 | Succeeded by William Buller |
