= Capture of Gorée =

1758 battle

- Part of Seven Years' War
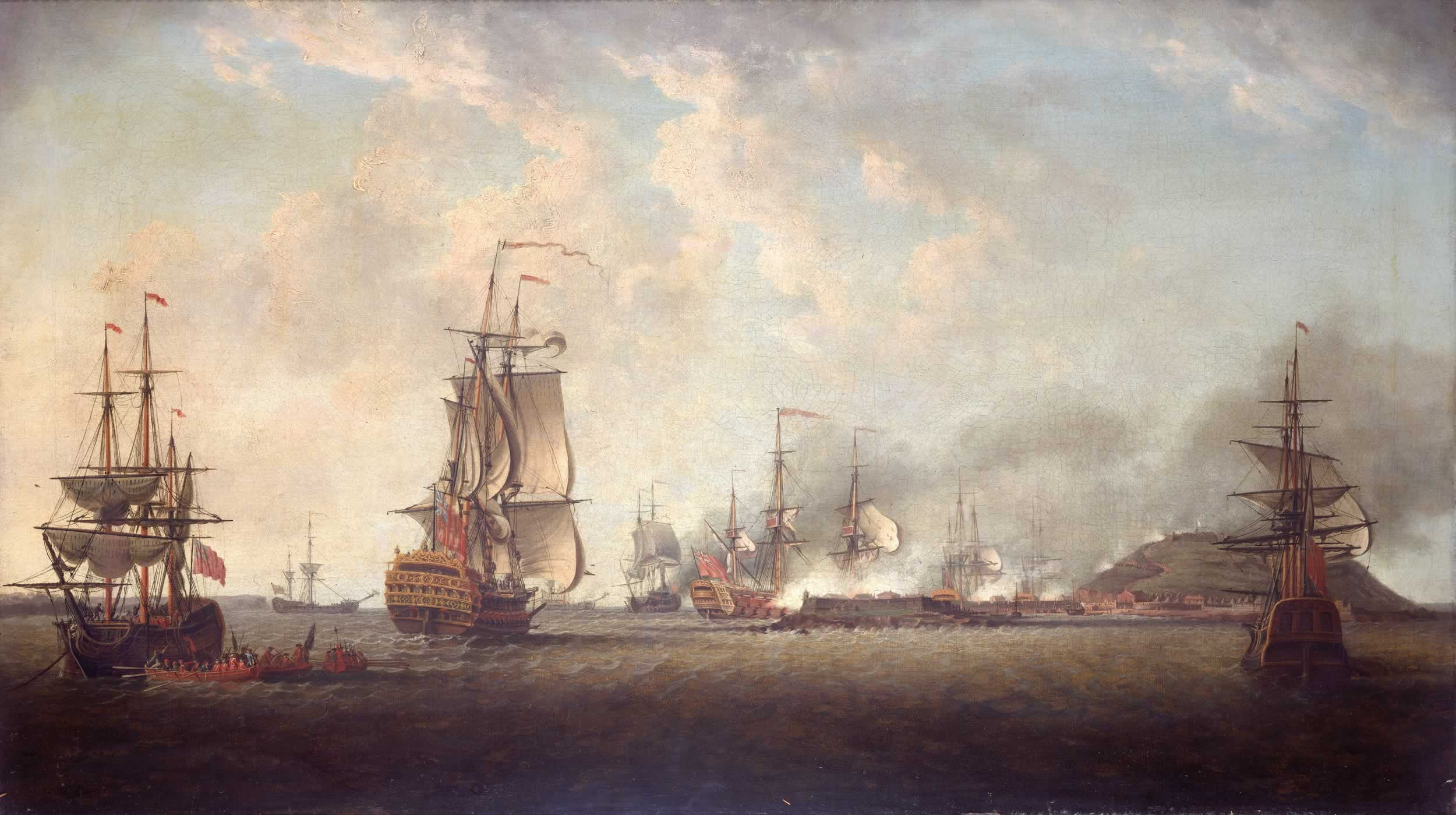
- Attack on Goree, 29 December 1758; Dominic Serres
| Date | December 1758 |
| Location | Gorée, French Empire 14.6669°N 17.3983°W |
| Result | British victory |

Belligerents
| Great Britain | France |

Commanders and leaders
| Augustus Keppel | Blaise de Saint-Jean |

Strength
| 11 warships | 300 |

Casualties and losses
| None | 300 captured |

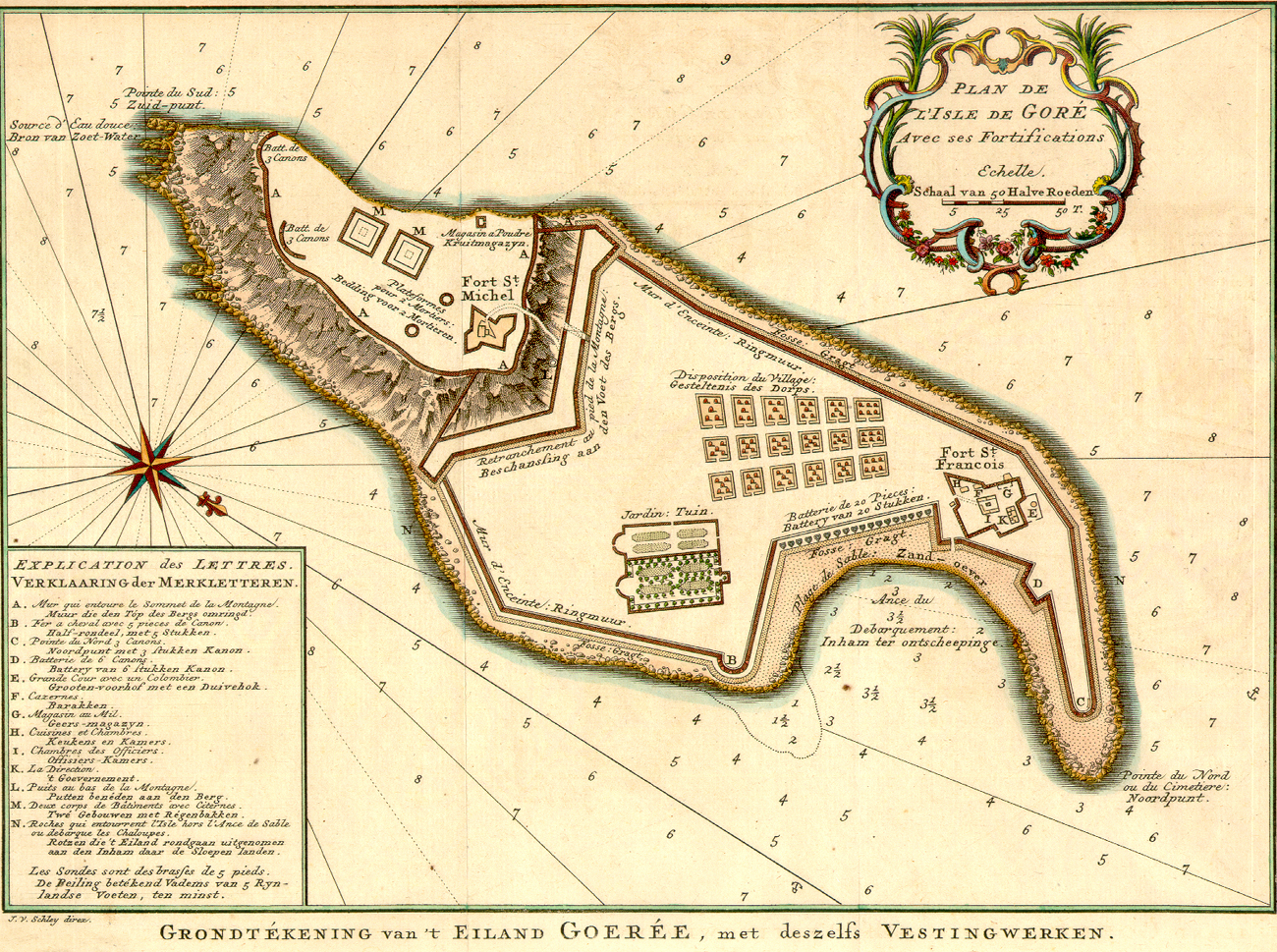
Gorée and its fortifications

The capture of Gorée occurred in December 1758 when a British naval expedition led by Augustus Keppel against the French island of Gorée off the coast of Senegal during the Seven Years' War. Keppel bombarded the fortress and then landed his marines to take possession. The French commander, Blaise Estoupan de Saint-Jean surrendered the fortress and the island. The 300-man garrison became prisoners of war, and 110 guns and mortars were captured.

The island was occupied by the British until 1763 when it was returned following the Treaty of Paris.

== Bibliography ==
- Anderson, Fred (2000). Crucible of War: The Seven Years' War and the fate of Empire in British North America, 1754–1766. Faber and Faber.
- Brown, Peter Douglas (1978). William Pitt, Earl of Chatham: The Great Commoner. George Allen & Unwin.
- Dull, Jonathan R. (2005). The French Navy and the Seven Years' War. University of Nebraska.
- McLynn, Frank (2005). 1759: The Year Britain Became Master of the World. Pimlico.
- Simms, Brendan (2008). Three Victories and a Defeat: The Rise and Fall of the First British Empire. Penguin Books.
