= William Buller (bishop) =

English clergyman

The Right Reverend William Buller
- Bishop of Exeter
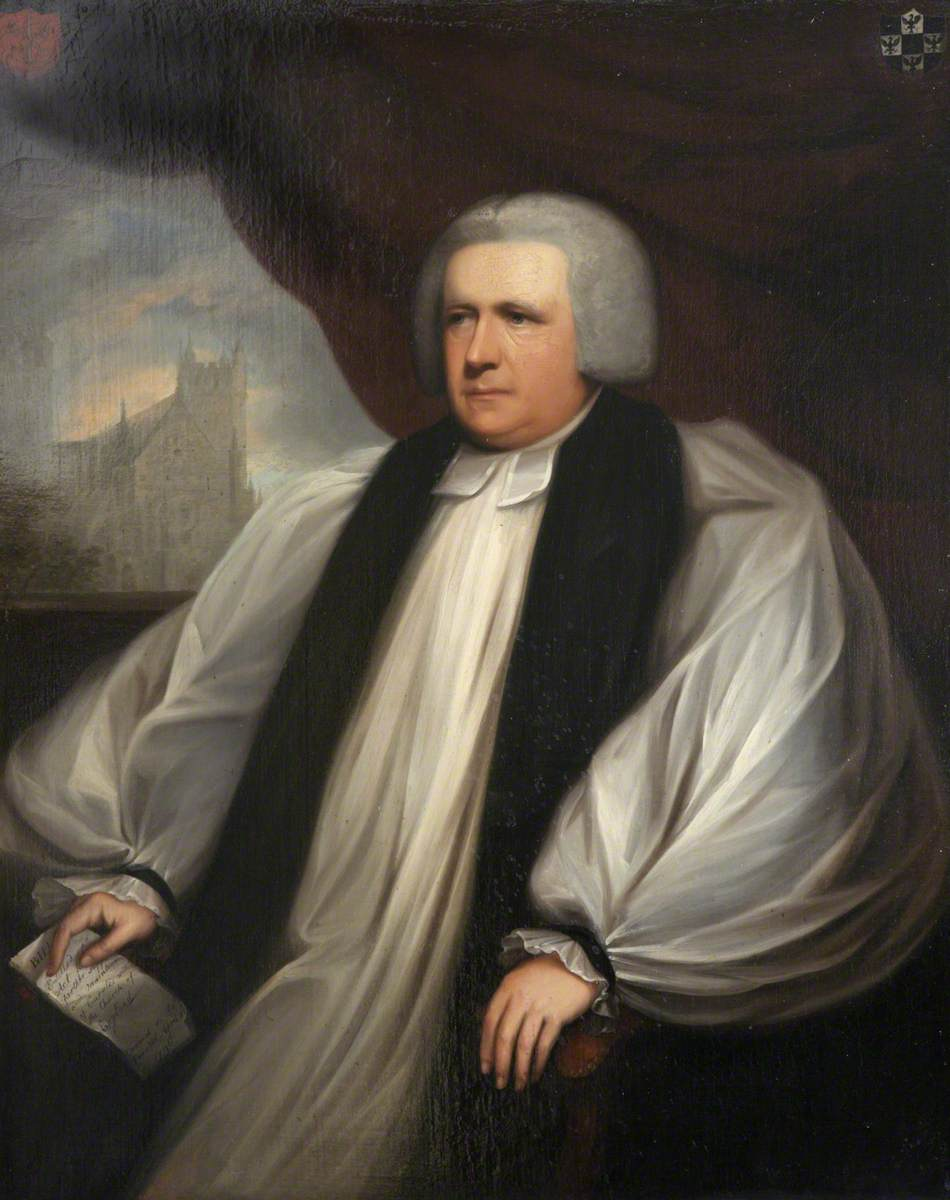
- Diocese: Diocese of Exeter
- In office: 1792–1796
- Predecessor: John Ross
- Successor: Reginald Courtenay
- Other post: Bishop of Bristol (1794–1797)

Personal details
- Born: baptized 9 August 1735
- Died: 12 December 1796 (aged 61)
- Denomination: Anglican
- Spouse: Anne Thomas (m.1762)
- Education: Christ Church, Oxford

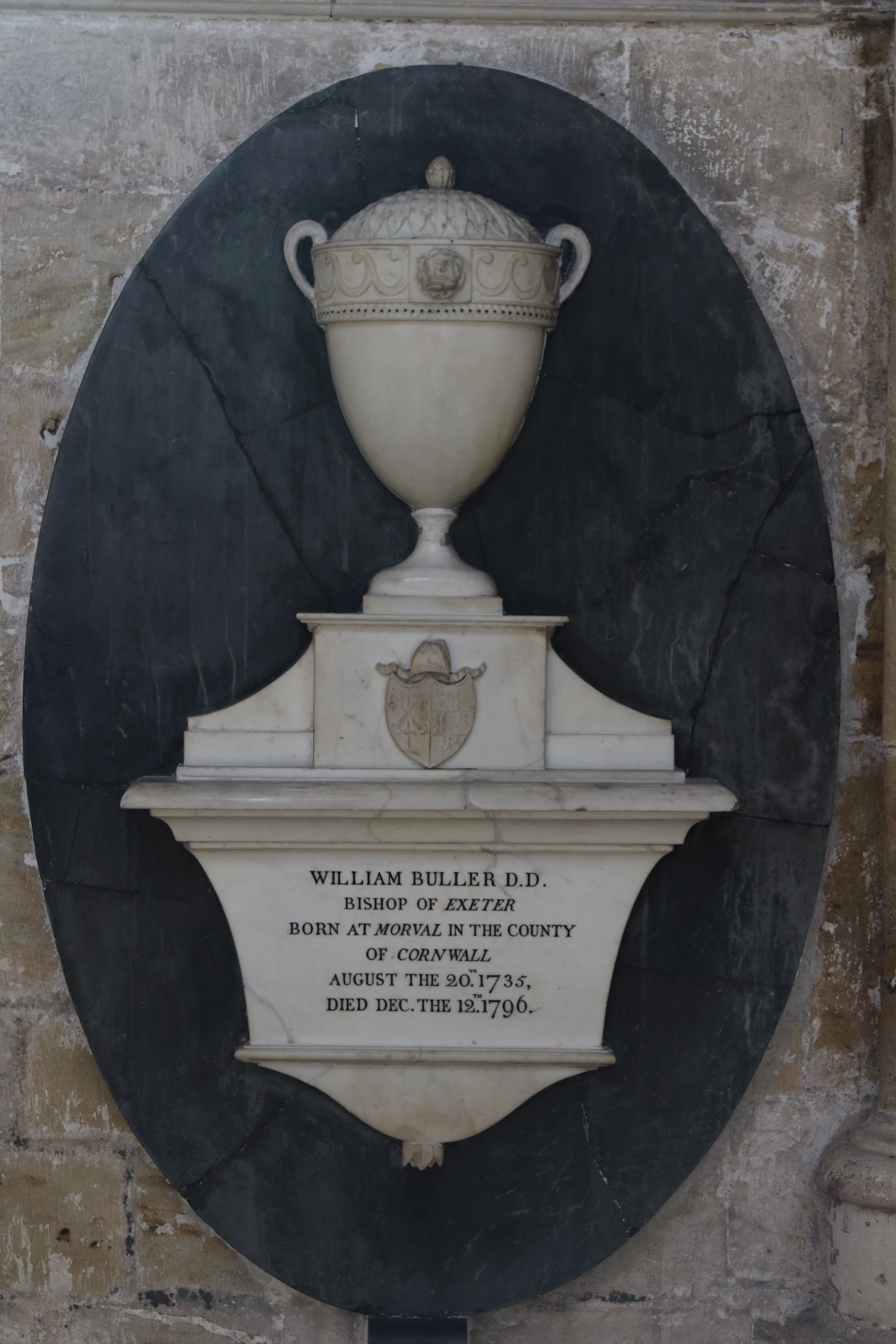
Memorial in Exeter Cathedral

William Buller (1735–1796) was an English clergyman who served as Bishop of Exeter from 1792 to 1796.

Buller was born probably at Morval, Cornwall, to John Francis Buller and Rebecca Trelawney. He was educated at Christ Church, Oxford, graduating BA in 1757, MA in 1759; BD and DD in 1781.

Buller's first ecclesiastical appointments were as rector of Brightwell and canon of Winchester Cathedral. He was also rector of North Waltham, In 1773, Buller became a canon residentiary of Windsor in 1773 and was selected dean of Exeter in 1784. In 1790 Buller was translated as Dean of Canterbury. Buller returned to Exeter as bishop in late 1792.

On 19 April 1762, Buller married Anne Thomas, the daughter of John Thomas, Bishop of Winchester.

Buller was a friend of George Austen, the father of Jane Austen, who educated his son Richard Buller.

William Buller died on 12 December 1796.

== Notes ==
Church of England titles
Preceded by Jeremiah Milles	Dean of Exeter; 1784–1790	Succeeded by Charles Harward
Preceded by George Horne	Dean of Canterbury; 1790–1792	Succeeded by Folliott Cornewall
Preceded by John Ross	Bishop of Exeter; 1792–1796	Succeeded by Reginald Courtenay
