= Reginald Courtenay (bishop of Exeter) =

English bishop (1741-1803)

The Right Reverend Reginald Courtenay
- Bishop of Exeter
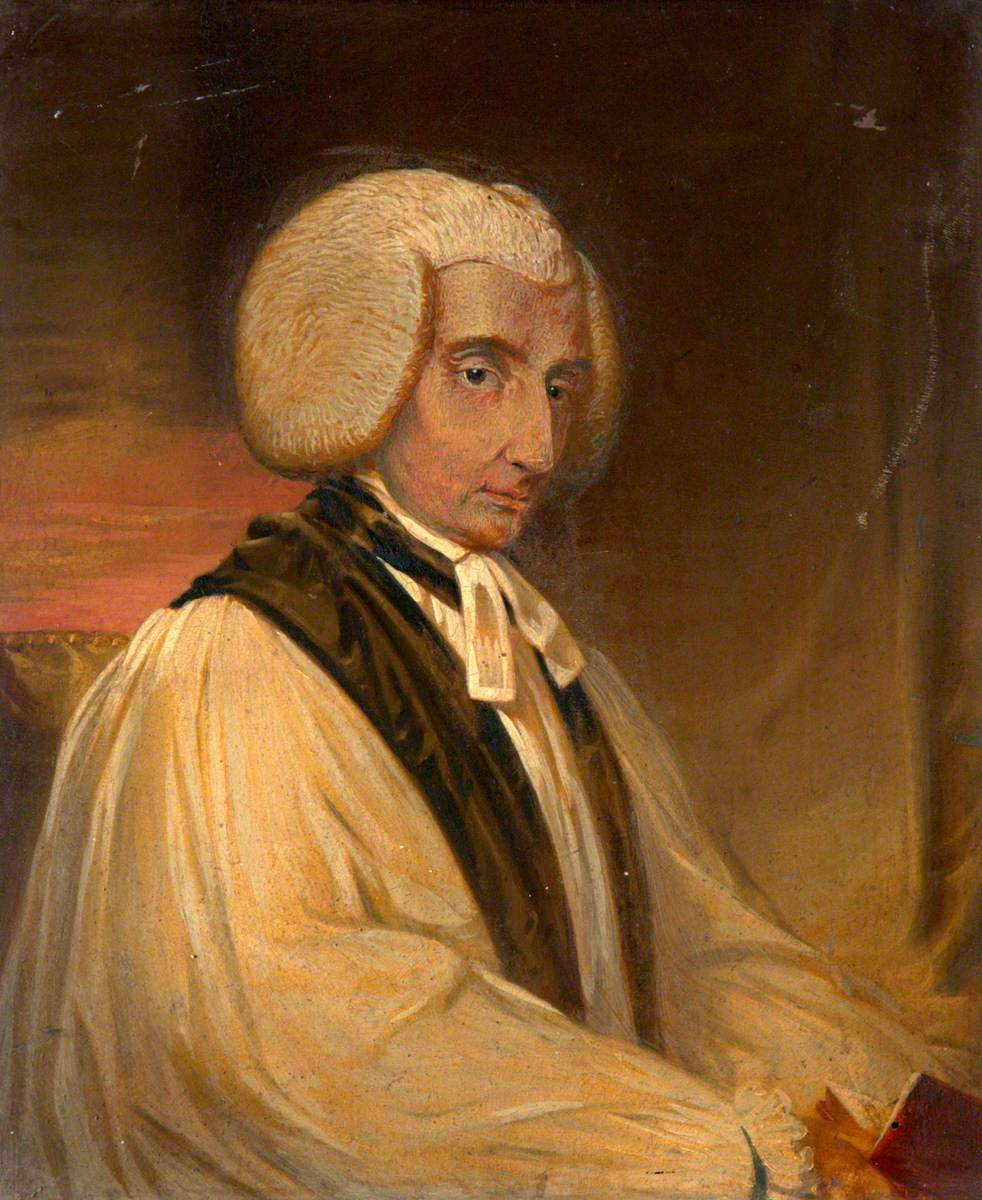
- Diocese: Diocese of Exeter
- In office: 1797–1803
- Predecessor: William Buller
- Successor: John Fisher
- Other post: Bishop of Bristol (1794–1797)

Personal details
- Born: 27 December 1741 Westminster St James, London
- Died: 9 June 1803 (aged 61) Lower Grosvenor Street, London
- Buried: Grosvenor Chapel
- Denomination: Anglican
- Spouse: Elizabeth Howard (m.1774)
- Education: Westminster School; Christ Church, Oxford

Henry Reginald Courtenay (27 December 1741 – 9 June 1803) was an Anglican clergyman who was Bishop of Bristol (1794–1797) and Bishop of Exeter (1797–1803).

== Life ==
He was the eldest surviving son of Henry Reginald Courtenay, M.P., who married Catherine, daughter of Allen Bathurst, 1st Earl Bathurst. He was born in the parish of St. James, Piccadilly, 27 December 1741, and admitted at Westminster School in 1755. He went on in 1759 to Christ Church, Oxford, where he took the degrees of B.A. 1763, M.A. 1766, and D.C.L. 1774.

Having taken orders in the English church, he had rapid preferment. The rectory of Lee in Kent and the second prebendal stall in Rochester Cathedral were conferred upon him in 1773. In the following year he was appointed to the rectory of St. George, Hanover Square, and he vacated his stall at Rochester; but he was one of the prebendaries of Exeter from 1772 to 1794, and he retained the fourth prebend at Rochester from 1783 to 1797. Early in 1794 he was nominated to the bishopric of Bristol, his consecration taking place on 11 May; and after three years was translated to the see of Exeter (March 1797), holding the archdeaconry of Exeter in commendam from that year until his death, and retaining as long as he lived his London rectory. He died in Lower Grosvenor Street, London, 9 June 1803, and was buried in the cemetery of Grosvenor Chapel.

== Family ==
His wife, Elizabeth, eldest daughter of Thomas Howard, 2nd Earl of Effingham, whom he married in January 1774, lived till 31 October 1815. They had two sons and four daughters. The elder son, William, who worked as clerk-assistant of the parliament, became in 1835 the 10th Earl of Devon; the younger son was Thomas Peregrine Courtenay.

== Memorial chimneypiece at Powderham ==
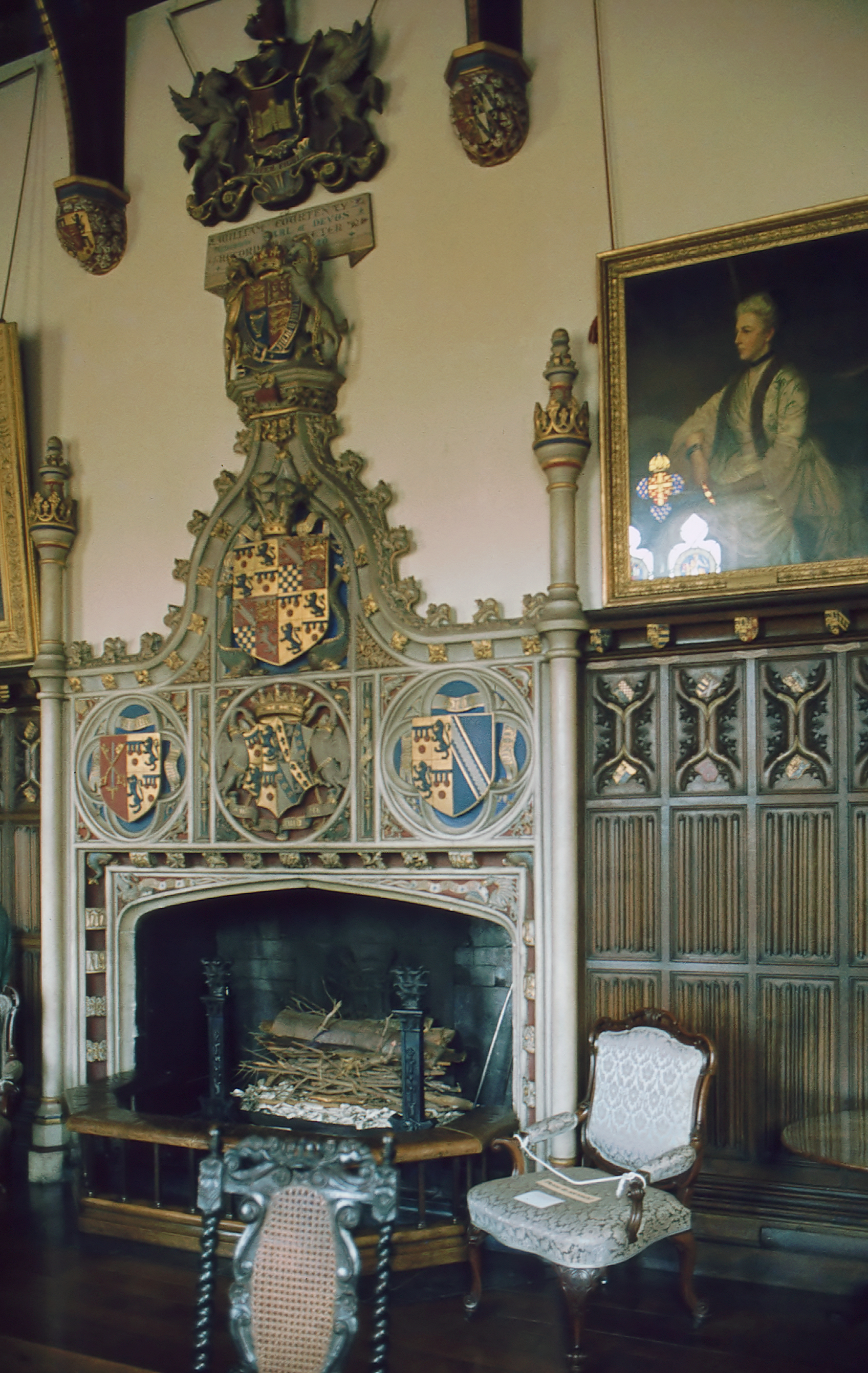
The heraldic chimneypiece at Powderham Castle

A monument to Bishop Reginald Courtenay exists in Powderham Castle, seat of the Earl of Devon, in the Victorian Dining Hall, built between 1847 and 1860, in the form of a heraldic chimneypiece. It is copied from the mediaeval chimneypiece in the Bishop's Palace, Exeter, installed c.1485 by Peter Courtenay (d.1492) Bishop of Exeter, a younger son of Sir Philip Courtenay (1404–1463) of Powderham. It was erected by William Courtenay, 11th Earl of Devon (d.1888) as a memorial to his grandfather Reginald Courtenay, Bishop of Exeter. The armorials on the lowest row are from left to right:

- Arms of Bishop Reginald Courtenay: See of Exeter impaling Courtenay (Grandfather of 11th Earl of Devon)
- Arms of William Courtenay, 10th Earl of Devon (d.1859), impaling the arms of his wife Hariet Leslie: Quarterly 1st & 4th: Pepys, Baronets of Juniper Hill; 2nd & 3rd: Leslie, Earls of Rothes. (Parents of 11th Earl of Devon)
- Arms of 11th Earl of Devon impaling arms of his wife Elizabeth Fortescue

Church of England titles
Preceded by Spencer Madan	Bishop of Bristol; 1794–1797	Succeeded by Folliott Cornewall
Preceded by William Buller	Bishop of Exeter; 1797–1803	Succeeded by John Fisher
