= Anne Lennox, Duchess of Richmond =

British noble (1671–1722)

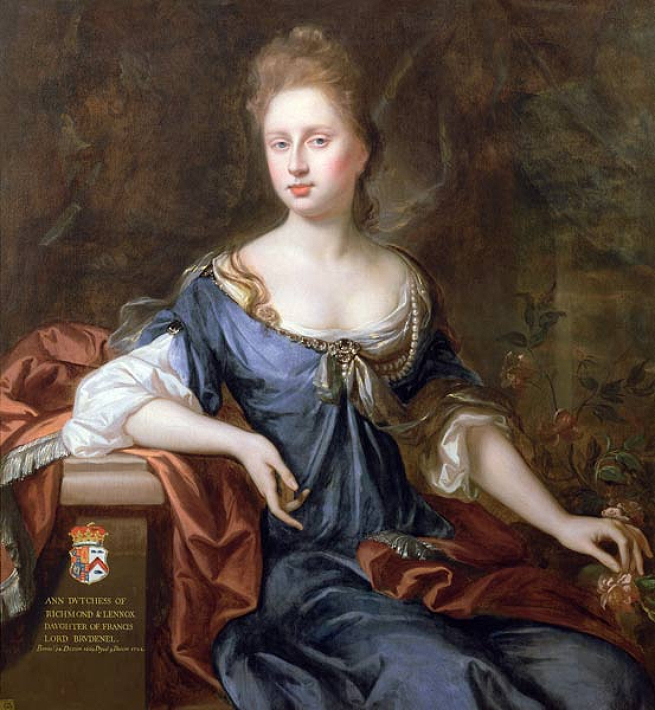
Portrait of Anne Lennox

Anne Lennox, Duchess of Richmond (née Brudenell; 1671 – 9 December 1722) was the wife of two English noblemen: first, Henry Belasyse, 2nd Baron Belasyse of Worlaby, and second, Charles Lennox, 1st Duke of Richmond. She was the mother of Charles Lennox, 2nd Duke of Richmond.

She was the daughter of Francis Brudenell, Baron Brudenell, and his wife, the former Lady Frances Savile. Her paternal grandfather was Robert Brudenell, 2nd Earl of Cardigan; her father would have inherited the earldom had he not predeceased his father.

Her first husband was Henry Belasyse, whom she married in about 1689; Belasyse died in August 1691. The couple had no children.

On 8 January 1692 Anne married the duke, who was an illegitimate son of King Charles II of England.

Their children were:

- Lady Louisa Lennox (1694–1716), who married James Berkeley, 3rd Earl of Berkeley
- Charles Lennox, Earl of March, later 2nd Duke of Richmond and 2nd Duke of Lennox, who married Lady Sarah Cadogan and had children
- Lady Anne Lennox, who married Willem van Keppel, 2nd Earl of Albemarle, and had children.

The duchess died in 1722, aged about 51. She was buried on 16 December 1722 in the Brudenell family vault at St Peter's Church, Deene, Northamptonshire, where her marble memorial, designed by Giovanni Battista Guelfi and erected in 1734, can still be seen. Her husband died the following year.
