= George Lavington =

British bishop (1684–1762)

- Bishop of Exeter
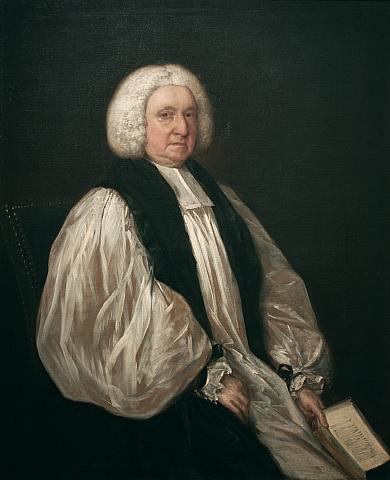
- Church: Church of England
- See: Exeter
- In office: 1746–1762
- Predecessor: Nicholas Claget
- Successor: Frederick Keppel

Personal details
- Born: 18 January 1684 Mildenhall, Wiltshire, England
- Died: 13 September 1762 (aged 78) Exeter, Devon, England
- Spouse: Frances Marie Lavie (m. 1722–1762)

George Lavington (18 January 1684 – 13 September 1762) was Bishop of Exeter from 1746 to 1762.

Born in Mildenhall, Wiltshire to Rev Joseph Lavington and his wife Elizabeth née Constable, he was educated at New College, Oxford (becoming a fellow in 1708) and later appointed Chaplain to King George I. He served as a prebendary at Worcester Cathedral. Later, he served as Weldland prebendary at St Paul's Cathedral, London. On 8 February 1746, he was consecrated Bishop of Exeter at Lambeth Palace, which post he held until death.

He was an ardent opponent of Methodism. On being appointed bishop of Exeter, which included Cornwall, one of his first acts was to close the pulpits of North Cornwall to Methodists. He also produced a stream of letters and pamphlets attacking Methodism and John Wesley. One of these pamphlets contained an accusation against Wesley concerning his conduct with women, and in particular that he had made indecent advances to the maid of a Mrs Morgan at Mitchell in Cornwall. When Wesley investigated he found that Mrs Morgan was merely a gossip, and that Lavington had never troubled to verify the truth of the statements. Lavington also attacked George Whitfield, although their relations were better and Lavington once came with his clergy to hear Whitfield preach.

A reconciliation took place between the Bishop and John Wesley when they had dinner together on 29 August 1762 after receiving the Sacrament together in Exeter Cathedral. The prelate died a fortnight later.

A portrait painting of Lavington from the early 1760s by Thomas Gainsborough survives.

An epitaph by Subdean Barton is on a tablet behind the sedilia in the south aisle of Exeter Cathedral, describing him as a pattern for Christian bishops.

== Family ==
He married Frances Mary Lavie (bur. 29 Nov 1763 Exeter Cathedral) of Corfe Mullen, Dorset, on 20 June 1722 at St Benet's Church, London and had at least 3 children by her:

1. George Lavington (bapt 14 April 1723 and bur. 20 April 1723, Worcester Cathedral)
2. Margaret Frances Lavington (bapt 30 April 1724 and bur. 30 April 1726, Worcester Cathedral)
3. Anne Lavington (bapt 11 April 1730, Worcester Cathedral – died 16 January 1811, Exeter), who married Nutcombe Quicke (1727–1810), the Chancellor of Exeter Cathedral

== Inheritance ==
Lavington, who had met Richard, Earl of Ranelagh prior to 1714 when he was serving at St. Paul's, was appointed one of the beneficiaries of his will. This was probably because Richard had three daughters and no sons. Among the lands included in the will were extensive estates in Ireland in Counties Roscommon and Meath.

== Arms ==
Coat of arms of George Lavington
Escutcheon Argent, a saltire gules, on a chief of the second three boars' heads couped or.

== Sources ==
- Bibliographic directory from Project Canterbury
- Courtney, William Prideaux (1892). "Lavington, George" . In Lee, Sidney (ed.). Dictionary of National Biography. Vol. 32. London: Smith, Elder & Co.
- Haydon, Colin (May 2009). "Lavington, George (1684–1762)". Oxford Dictionary of National Biography (online ed.). Oxford University Press. doi:10.1093/ref:odnb/16136. (Subscription, Wikipedia Library access or UK public library membership required.)

Church of England titles
Preceded by Nicholas Claget	Bishop of Exeter; 1746–1762	Succeeded by Frederick Keppel
