= Folliott Cornewall =

English bishop

The Right Reverend Folliott Cornewall
- Bishop of Worcester
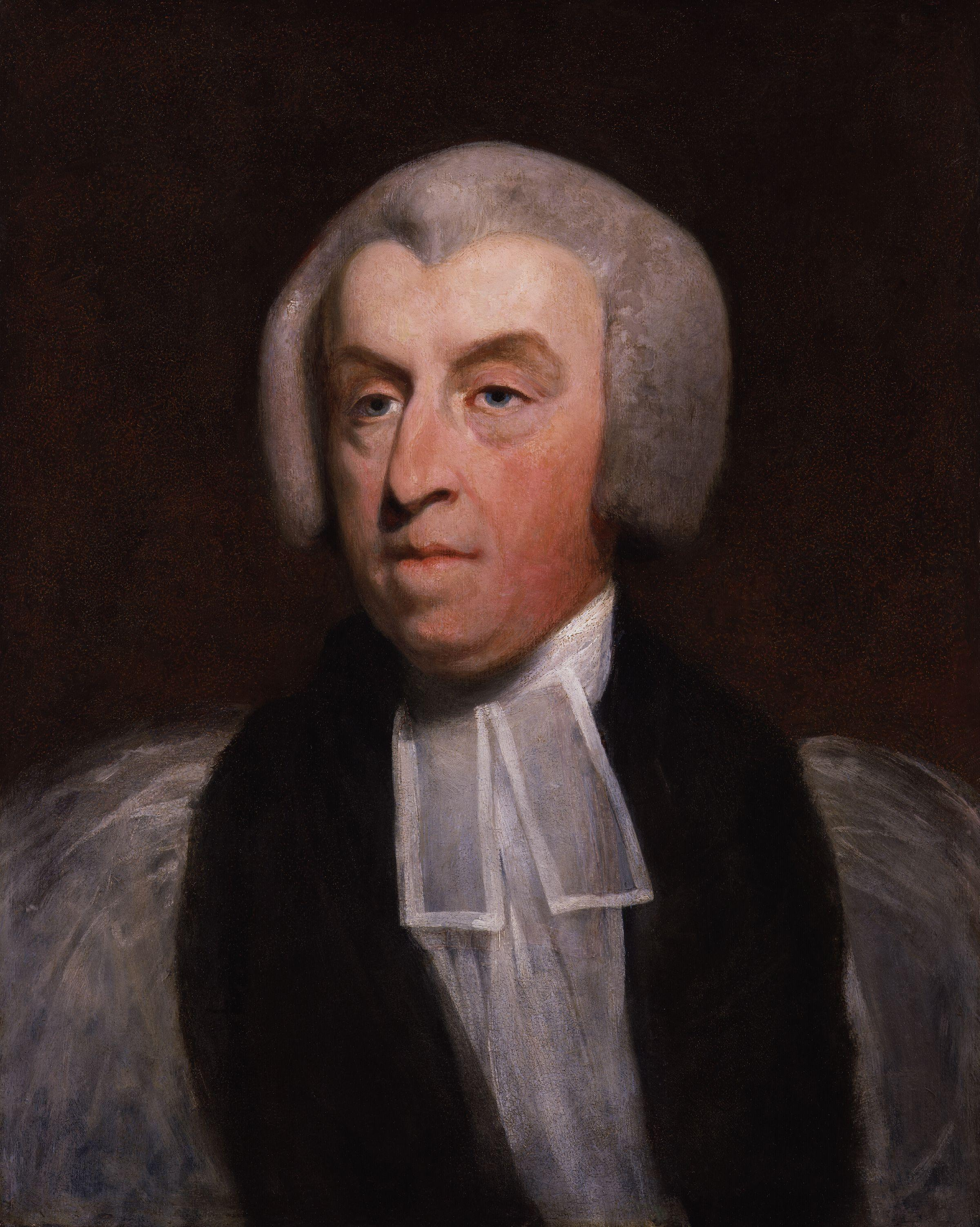
- Cornewall by William Owen
- Church: Church of England
- Province: Canterbury
- Diocese: Worcester
- Appointed: 1808
- Predecessor: Richard Hurd
- Successor: Robert James Carr
- Previous posts: Bishop of Bristol; Bishop of Hereford

Orders
- Ordination: 14 December 1777 by John Hinchliffe

Personal details
- Born: Folliott Herbert Cornewall Ludlow, Shropshire
- Baptised: 9 May 1754
- Died: 5 September 1831 (aged 77) Hartlebury, Worcestershire
- Denomination: Church of England
- Parents: Frederick Cornewall and Mary Herbert
- Education: St. John's College, Cambridge

Folliott Herbert Walker Cornewall (bapt. 9 May 1754 – 5 September 1831) was an English bishop of three sees.

== Life ==
Folliott (or Folliot) Herbert Cornewall was baptised in Ludlow on 9 May 1754, the second surviving son of Captain Frederick Cornewall and Mary, daughter of Francis Herbert of Ludlow, first cousin of Henry Herbert, 1st Earl of Powis. He was educated at Eton College before going to St. John's College, Cambridge, where he matriculated in 1776, was awarded a B.A. and an M.A. in 1780. He was a Fellow from 1777 to 1784.

Cornewall was ordained as a deacon on 14 December 1777, and as a priest on 20 December 1778, by John Hinchliffe, Bishop of Peterborough. In 1780, through the interest of his second cousin, Charles Wolfran Cornwall, Speaker of the House of Commons, he obtained the post of Chaplain to the Speaker of the House of Commons. He became rector of Frilsham in 1781, and vicar of East Rudham in 1786. He was also preferred to a canonry at Windsor in 1784.

Cornewall inherited the estates of his older brother, Frederick, on his death in 1783, and also those of a relative: Francis Walker of Ferney Hall. To obtain the latter inheritance, Cornewall added the name "Walker" to his own. He was appointed master of Wigston's Hospital, Leicester, in 1790, dean of Canterbury in 1792, bishop of Bristol in 1797. He exchanged this see to become bishop of Hereford in 1803, and in 1808 he was translated to be bishop of Worcester.

In 1817 he served as treasurer of the Salop Infirmary in Shrewsbury.

He published A Sermon preached before the House of Commons on 30 Jan. 1782, and also A Fast Sermon preached before the House of Lords in 1798.

== Marriage and family ==
Cornewall married Anne Hamilton (d. 15 December 1795) on 19 June 1787, at Taplow, Buckinghamshire. She was the eldest daughter of Hon. George Hamilton, canon of Windsor, youngest son of James Hamilton, 7th Earl of Abercorn. The couple had three children:

- Frederick Hamilton Cornewall (15 October 1791 – 30 December 1845), MP for Bishop's Castle
- Marianne Cornewall (1793–1865), died unmarried
- Herbert Cornewall (21 July 1794 – 1863), married Charlotte, daughter of Lord Charles Somerset

Folliot Cornewall died at Hartlebury on 5 September 1831 aged 77, and was buried in the family vault at Diddlebury, Shropshire.

According to the Gentleman's Magazine, he "was possessed of fair scholarship, strong good sense, polished manners, and an amiable temper: and had passed a virtuous and exemplary life."

Church of England titles
Preceded by William Welfitt	Chaplain to the Speaker of the House of Commons; 1780–1784	Succeeded by Philip Williams
Preceded by William Buller	Dean of Canterbury; 1792–1797	Succeeded by Thomas Powys
Preceded by Henry Reginald Courtenay	Bishop of Bristol; 1797–1802	Succeeded by George Pelham
Preceded by John Butler	Bishop of Hereford; 1802–1808	Succeeded by John Luxmoore
Preceded by Richard Hurd	Bishop of Worcester; 1808–1831	Succeeded by Robert James Carr
