= Richard Hurd (bishop) =

18th-century English bishop, divine, and writer

The Right Reverend Richard Hurd
- Bishop of Lichfield and Coventry and Worcester
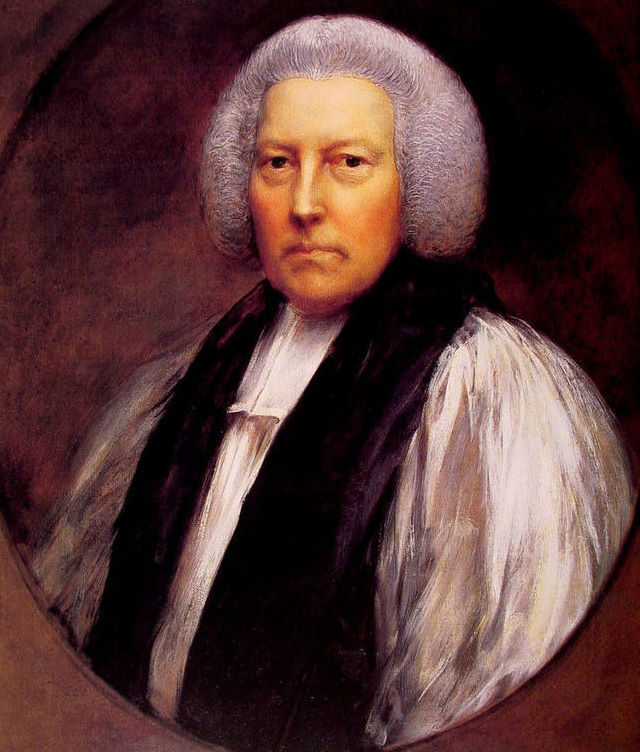
- Bishop Hurd, as painted by Thomas Gainsborough.

Personal details
- Born: 1720 Congreve, Penkridge, Staffordshire
- Died: 28 May 1808 (aged 88) Hartlebury Castle, Worcestershire
- Buried: Hartlebury churchyard
- Denomination: Church of England
- Parents: John Hurd (1685–1755) and Hannah Hurd (c. 1685–1773).
- Education: Emmanuel

Richard Hurd (13 January 1720 – 28 May 1808) was an English divine and writer, and bishop of Worcester.

== Life ==
He was born at Congreve, in the parish of Penkridge, Staffordshire, where his father was a farmer. He was educated at Brewood Grammar School and at Emmanuel College, Cambridge. He took his B.A. degree in 1739, and in 1742 he took his M.A. and became a fellow of his college. In the same year he was ordained deacon, and given charge of the parish of Reymerston, Norfolk, but he returned to Cambridge early in 1743. He was ordained priest in 1744. In 1748 he published some Remarks on an Enquiry into the Rejection of Christian Miracles by the Heathens (1746), by William Weston, a fellow of St John's College, Cambridge.

He prepared editions, which won the praise of Edward Gibbon, of the Ars poetica and Epistola ad Pisones (1749), and the Epistola ad Augustum (1751) of Horace. A compliment in the preface to the edition of 1749 was the starting-point of a lasting friendship with William Warburton, through whose influence he was appointed one of the preachers at Whitehall in 1750.

In 1765 he was appointed preacher at Lincoln's Inn, and in 1767 he became Archdeacon of Gloucester.

In 1768, he obtained a Doctorate in Divinity at Cambridge, and delivered at Lincoln's Inn the first Warburton lectures, which were published later (1772) as An Introduction to the Study of the Prophecies concerning the Christian Church. He became bishop of Lichfield and Coventry in 1774, and two years later was selected to be tutor to the prince of Wales and the duke of York. In 1781 he was translated to the see of Worcester and made Clerk of the Closet, holding both positions until his death. He lived chiefly at Hartlebury Castle, where he built a fine library, to which he transferred Alexander Pope's and Warburton's books, purchased on the latter's death.

He was extremely popular at court, and in 1783, on the death of Archbishop Cornwallis, the king pressed him to accept the primacy, but Hurd, who was known, says Madame d'Arblay, as "The Beauty of Holiness", declined it as a charge not suited to his temper and talents, and much too heavy for him to sustain. He died, unmarried, on 28 May 1808. His memorial in Worcester Cathedral was sculpted by William Humphries Stephens.

He bequeathed his library to his successors as bishop, and it remains at Hartlebury Castle, but its fate remains uncertain, now that the castle has ceased to be used as the bishop's residence.

== Works ==
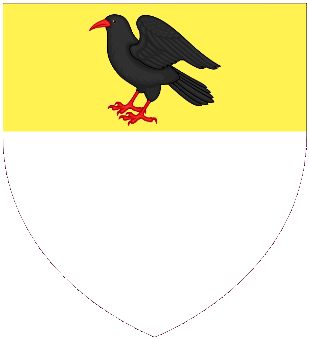
Hurd's arms are displayed at Lincoln's Inn, impaled with those of his diocese.

The philosopher David Hume refers in his autobiography to a pamphlet written by Dr Hurd published during the 1750s in opposition to Hume's Natural History of Religion.

Hurd's Letters on Chivalry and Romance (1762) retain a certain interest for their importance in the history of the romantic movement, which they did something to stimulate. They were written in continuation of a dialogue on the age of Queen Elizabeth I included in his Moral and Political Dialogues (1759) Two later dialogues On the Uses of Foreign Travel were printed in 1763. Hurd wrote two acrimonious defences of Warburton On the Delicacy of Friendship (1755), in answer to John Jortin and a Letter (1764) to Dr Thomas Leland, who had criticised Warburton's Doctrine of Grace. He edited the Works of William Warburton, the Select Works (1772) of Abraham Cowley, and left materials for an edition (6 vols., 1811) of Addison. His own works appeared in a collected edition in 8 vols. 1811.

Church of England titles
Preceded by Brownlow North	Bishop of Lichfield and Coventry; 1775–1781	Succeeded by Hon. James Cornwallis
Preceded by Brownlow North	Bishop of Worcester; 1781–1808	Succeeded by Folliott Herbert Walker Cornewall
