= Louisa Berkeley, Countess of Berkeley =

British noble (1694–1716)

The Right Honourable The Countess of Berkeley
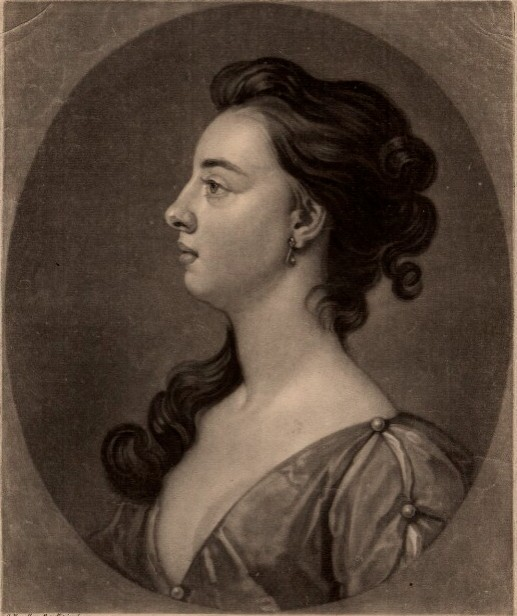
- Louisa Berkeley, Countess of Berkeley, after Kneller
- Born: 24 December 1694
- Died: 15 January 1716 (aged 21)
- Spouse: James Berkeley, 3rd Earl of Berkeley
- Issue: Lt. Col. Augustus Berkeley, 4th Earl of Berkeley; Lady Elizabeth Berkeley
- Father: Charles Lennox, 1st Duke of Richmond
- Mother: Anne Brudenell

Louisa Berkeley, Countess of Berkeley (née Lennox; 24 December 1694 – 15 January 1716) was the first wife of James Berkeley, 3rd Earl of Berkeley. Her father Charles was an illegitimate child of King Charles II, thus making her the king's granddaughter.

== Life ==
She was the older daughter of Charles Lennox, 1st Duke of Richmond, and his wife, the former Anne Brudenell.

Louisa married the Earl of Berkeley on 13 February 1711. At the time of her wedding, Jonathan Swift said of her: "the chit is but 17 and is ill-natured, covetous, vicious and proud in extremes."

They had two children:

- Lt. Col. Augustus Berkeley, 4th Earl of Berkeley (18 February 1715 – 9 January 1755)
- Lady Elizabeth Berkeley (15 January 1716 - died 1745), who married Anthony Henley

The countess died of smallpox, aged 21, and was buried at St Mary's Church, Berkeley.

From 1714 until her death, she was a Lady of the Bedchamber to Caroline of Ansbach, Princess of Wales.
