= HMS Maidstone (1744) =

Ship of the line of the Royal Navy

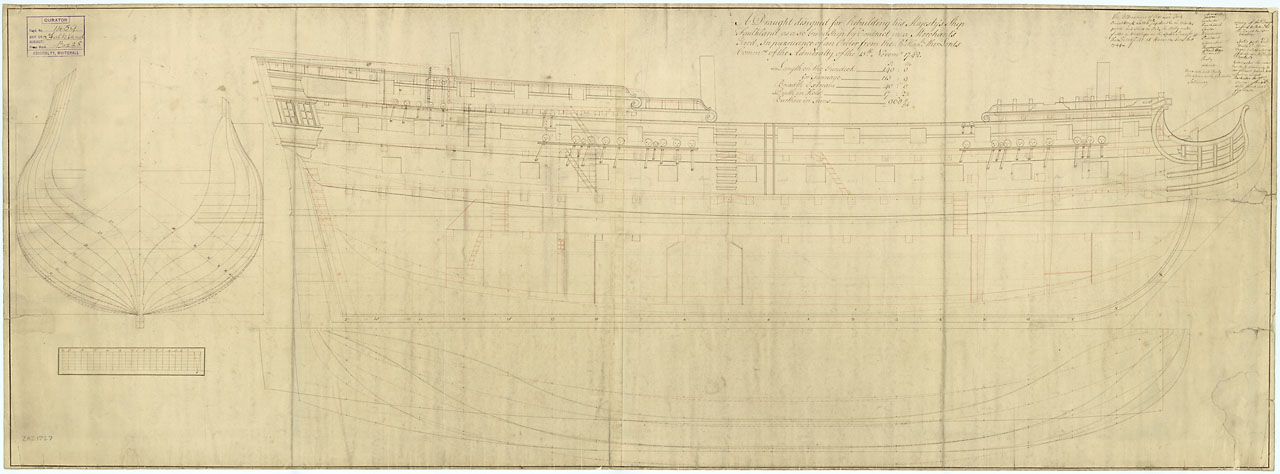
- Maidstone

History

Great Britain
- Name: HMS Maidstone
- Ordered: 16 May 1743
- Builder: Wells, Rotherhithe
- Launched: 12 October 1744
- Fate: Wrecked, 1747

General characteristics
- Class & type: 1741 proposals 50-gun fourth rate ship of the line
- Tons burthen: 979
- Length: 140 ft (42.7 m) (gundeck)
- Beam: 40 ft (12.2 m)
- Depth of hold: 17 ft 2 1/2 in (5.2 m)
- Propulsion: Sails
- Sail plan: Full-rigged ship
- Armament: 50 guns: Gundeck: 22 × 24 pdrs; Upper gundeck: 22 × 12 pdrs; Quarterdeck: 4 × 6 pdrs; Forecastle: 2 × 6 pdrs

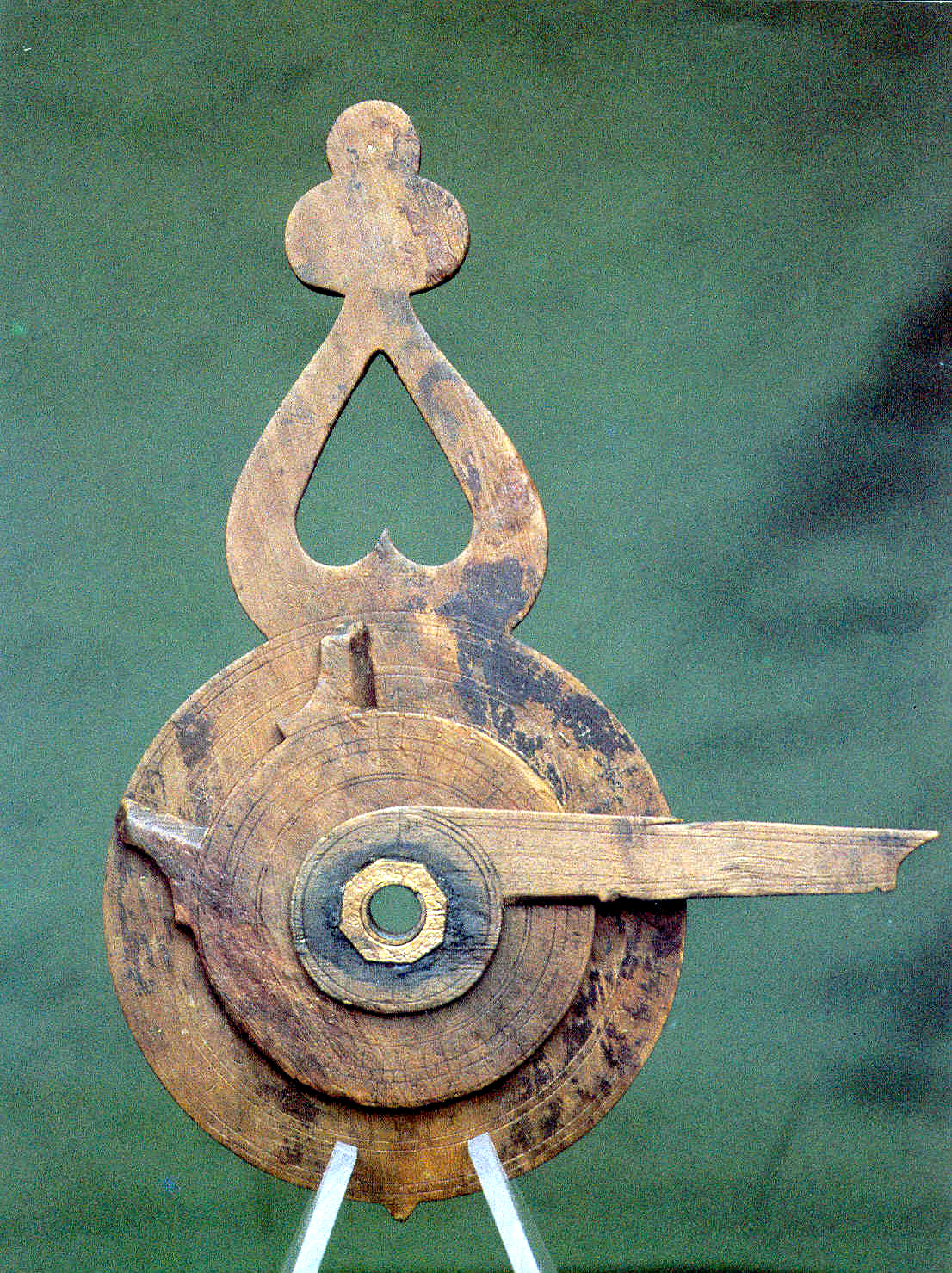
A nocturlabe from HMS Maidstone

HMS Maidstone was a 50-gun fourth rate ship of the line of the Royal Navy, built at Rotherhithe to the dimensions laid down in the 1741 proposals of the 1719 Establishment, and launched on 12 October 1744.

Maidstone had a short life, being wrecked in 1747.
