= Willem van Keppel, 2nd Earl of Albemarle =

British Army officer, diplomat, courtier and colonial administrator (1702–1754)

Lieutenant-General The Right Honourable The Earl of Albemarle KG KB PC
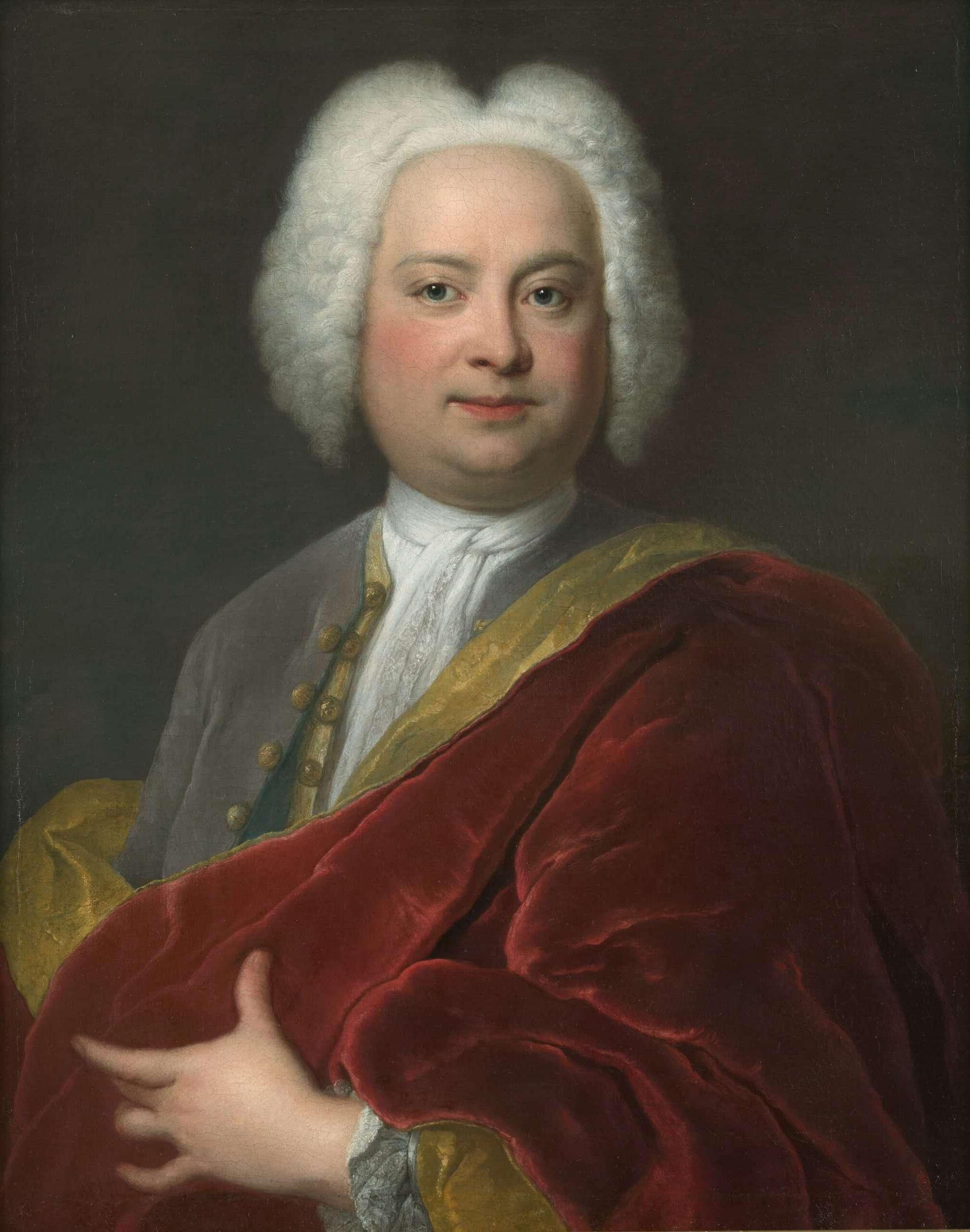
- Portrait attributed to Charles Philips, c. 1745
- Born: 5 June 1702; Whitehall Palace, England
- Died: 22 December 1754 (aged 52); Paris, France
- Burial place: Grosvenor Chapel, Audley Street, London
- Relatives: Admiral Augustus Keppel, 1725–1786 (son)
- Military career
- Allegiance: Great Britain
- Branch: British Army
- Service years: 1717–1748
- Rank: Lieutenant-General
- Units: Colonel, 29th Foot (Note: Until 1751, most regiments were named after their current Colonel but the post-1751 numbers are used for convenience) 1731–1733; Coldstream Guards 1744–1754
- Commands: Governor of Virginia 1737–1754; Commander, Scotland 1746–1747
- Conflicts: War of the Austrian Succession; Dettingen; Fontenoy; Lauffeld; Jacobite rising of 1745; Culloden
- Awards: Lord of the Bedchamber 1722–1751; Knight of the Bath 1725; Knight of the Garter 1750; Groom of the Stole 1751–1754

Lieutenant-General Willem Anne van Keppel, 2nd Earl of Albemarle (5 June 1702 – 22 December 1754) was a British Army officer, diplomat, courtier and colonial administrator. He held various roles in the household of George II of Great Britain, who was a personal friend, participated in negotiations to end the 1718 to 1720 War of the Quadruple Alliance and was British ambassador to France from 1748 to 1754.

During the 1740 to 1748 War of the Austrian Succession, he commanded troops in Flanders and was transferred to Scotland following the outbreak of the Jacobite rising of 1745. After the Battle of Culloden, he was appointed Commander-in-Chief, Scotland before returning to Flanders in 1747. Despite his many offices and inheriting a large fortune, he was known as the "Spendthrift Earl" and died in 1754 leaving his family nothing but debts.

== Life ==
William (or Willem) Anne van Keppel was born 5 June 1702 at Whitehall Palace in London, only son of Arnold, 1st Earl of Albemarle (1670-1718) and Geertruid van der Duyn (died 1741). His father was popular with both William III and Queen Anne, who was his godmother.

In 1722, he married Lady Anne Lennox (1703 – 1789), daughter of the Duke of Richmond, an illegitimate son of Charles II. She was Lady of the Bedchamber to Caroline of Ansbach (1683-1737); she was reputedly a great favourite of George II, who paid her a pension of £1,500 per annum when Albemarle died in 1754.

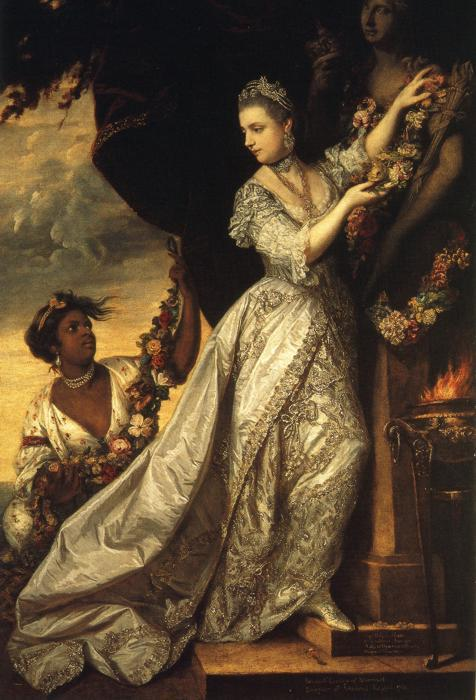
his daughter Lady Elizabeth Keppel (1761), Sir Joshua Reynolds

They had over fifteen children, of whom six survived to adulthood; George, 3rd Earl of Albemarle (1724-1772), Augustus (1725-1786), William (1727–1782), Frederick (1728–1777), Caroline (1733–69) mother of Sir Robert Adair and Lady Elizabeth Keppel (1739–1768), who was featured in the famous painting by Joshua Reynolds.

== Career ==
Albemarle was educated in the Dutch province of Gelderland, where the family originated. After returning to England in 1717, he was commissioned in the Coldstream Foot Guards and succeeded his father as Earl of Albemarle in 1718. Over the next few years, he and a colleague John Huske accompanied the Earl of Cadogan in meetings with the Dutch over the War of the Quadruple Alliance; financially exhausted by the War of the Spanish Succession, they were anxious to avoid another. The Treaty of The Hague was agreed in 1720, although negotiations continued with Austria.

Like his father, Albemarle appears to have had a talent for making powerful friends; his marriage in 1722 was held at Cadogan's house near Caversham, outside Reading. He was also made Lord of the Bedchamber to the future George II, then Prince of Wales, a position he retained until 1751. The role provided proximity to the monarch; its holder was a trusted confidant and often extremely powerful.

In 1737, he was appointed Governor of Virginia, which he retained until his death, despite never setting foot in it. As was common, the administrative work was done by his deputy Sir William Gooch, although the two frequently clashed over appointments. Albemarle County, Virginia was named after him; it is better known as the location of Monticello, the estate built by Thomas Jefferson.

Between 1713 and 1739, Britain was mostly at peace; Albemarle was Colonel of the 29th Regiment of Foot from 1731 to 1733 before transferring to the Royal Horse Guards. As personal escorts to the king, they rarely left London but Albemarle commanded them at Dettingen in 1743, when George II became the last British monarch to command troops in battle. He became Colonel of the Coldstream Guards in 1744 and fought under the Duke of Cumberland at Fontenoy in April 1745.

With the outbreak of the 1745 Jacobite Rising, Albemarle was sent to Newcastle as deputy to the elderly George Wade. He commanded the government front line at Culloden in April 1746 and subsequently appointed Commander-in-Chief, Scotland, despite referring to it as "this cursed country". He told the Duke of Newcastle, then Secretary of State for the Southern Department that "my predecessors have split against a sharp rock". The appointment of a senior and trusted subordinate reflected a widespread perception among both government officials and Jacobite rebels that another landing was imminent.

The immediate focus was capturing the fugitive Charles Stuart but despite a reward of £30,000, he evaded Albemarle's patrols and escaped to France in September. In 2018, previously unknown records from 1746 and 1747 were discovered in Ipswich; these include intelligence reports on the search and details showing that after Culloden, Albemarle received a thousand guineas and the Prince's silver-gilt travelling canteen. (Note: This was sold in 1963, and is now on display in the National Museum of Scotland in Edinburgh)

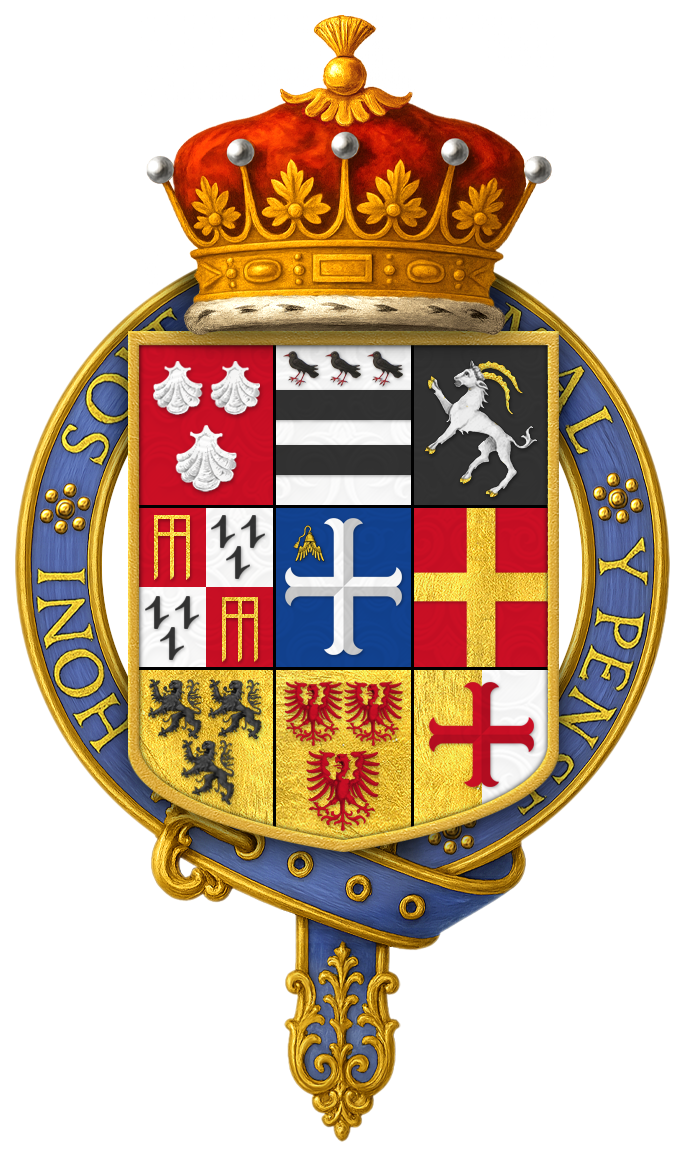
Quartered coat of arms of Willem Anne van Keppel, 2nd Earl of Albemarle, KG

With his headquarters in Edinburgh, Albemarle divided Scotland into four military districts and carried out measures intended to bring the Highlands under control. They included extending the military road network begun in 1715 and placing permanent garrisons at key points, whose role was to enforce the 1746 Disarming and Dress Acts. In February 1747, he was relieved as commander in Scotland and rejoined the army in Flanders, commanding the British infantry at Lauffeld in July. Although this was a decisive French victory that effectively ended the War of the Austrian Succession, his troops' disciplined fire helped the Pragmatic Army make an orderly retreat.

After the war ended with the 1748 Treaty of Aix-la-Chapelle, he was sent to Paris as Ambassador, where he was a great success, entertaining on a lavish scale and sharing a mistress with Giacomo Casanova. He was made a Knight of the Garter in 1750, then a Privy Counsellor the following year.

Albemarle died aged 52 in Paris on 22 December 1754, returning home from a pre-Christmas supper; he was buried on 21 February 1755 in Grosvenor Chapel on South Audley Street in London. When his long-term colleague and friend John Huske died in 1761, he instructed his coffin be placed next to that of Albemarle.

Notoriously extravagant, he died leaving nothing but debts, although his sons had successful careers; in 1740, Augustus Keppel participated in Anson's capture of the Manila galleon, which made the officers wealthy men in their own right.

In her biography of Madame de Pompadour, the writer Nancy Mitford remarks that given his love of all things French, it was a blessing Albemarle died before the Seven Years' War broke out. She records that the French admired his love of life and wit; when a rapacious mistress admired the beauty of the stars, he replied that unfortunately, he was unable to buy them for her.

== Arms ==
Coat of arms of Willem van Keppel, 2nd Earl of Albemarle
Coronet Coronet of an Earl. Crest Out of a ducal coronet or, a swan's head and neck argent. Escutcheon Gules, three escallops argent. Supporters Two lions ducally crowned or. Motto Ne cede malis (Yield not to adversity) Orders The Most Noble Order of the Garter - Knight Companion (KG).

== Sources ==
- Allardyce, James (1895). Historical papers relating to the Jacobite period, 1699-1750. Vol. 2. Aberdeen: Printed for the New Spalding Club.
- Anderson, BJ, ed. (1902). The Albemarle papers; being the correspondence of William Anne, second earl of Albemarle, commander-in-chief in Scotland, 1746-1747. Aberdeen University.
- Casanova, Giacomo (1960). History of My Life, Volume 3. Translated by Trask, Willard. The Johns Hopkins University Press. ISBN 978-1857152906.
- Heathcote, Tony (2002). The British Admirals of the Fleet 1734–1995. Pen & Sword. ISBN 0-85052-835-6.
- Mitford, Nancy; Madame de Pompadour Hamish Hamilton, 1954
- Riding, Jacqueline (2016). Jacobites: A New History of the 45 Rebellion. Bloomsbury. ISBN 978-1408819128.
- Royle, Trevor (2016). Culloden; Scotland's Last Battle and the Forging of the British Empire. Little, Brown. ISBN 978-1408704011.
- Spain, Jonathan (2004). Keppel, William Anne, second earl of Albemarle. Oxford DNB.
- Tucker, Spencer C, ed. (2012). Almanac of American Military History; Volume I. ABC-CLIO. ISBN 978-1598845303.

Government offices
Preceded by The Earl of Orkney	Crown Governor of Virginia; 1737–1754	Succeeded by The Earl of Loudoun
Diplomatic posts
Vacant None due to War of the Austrian Succession Title last held by Anthony Thompson	British Ambassador to France; 1748–1754	Vacant None due to Seven Years' War Title next held by Duke of Bedford
Military offices
Preceded by Henry Hawley	Commander-in-Chief, Scotland; July 1746 to February 1747	Succeeded by Humphrey Bland
Preceded by Henry Disney	Colonel, 29th Foot; 1731–1733	Succeeded by George Reade
Preceded by Earl of Cholmondeley	Captain and Colonel, 3rd Troop of Horse Guards; 1733–1744	Succeeded by Lord Tyrawley
Preceded by The Duke of Marlborough	Colonel of the Coldstream Regiment; 1744–1754	Succeeded by Lord Tyrawley
Court offices
Preceded by Earl of Pembroke	Groom of the Stole; 1751–1754	Succeeded by Earl of Rochford
Peerage of England
Preceded by Arnold Joost van Keppel	Earl of Albemarle; 1718–1754	Succeeded by George Keppel
