= Anne van Keppel, Countess of Albemarle =

British court official and noble

The Right Honourable The Countess of Albemarle
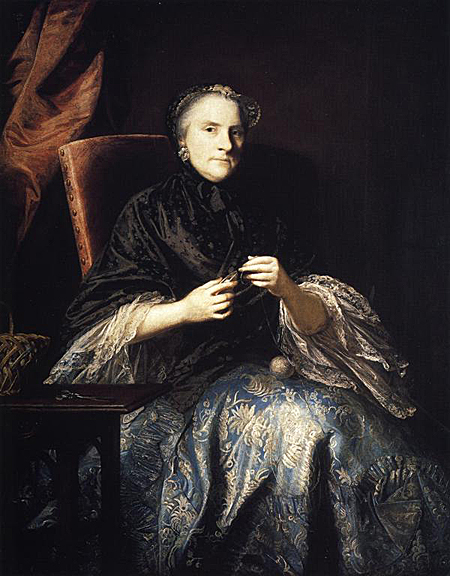
- Portrait by Sir Joshua Reynolds
- Born: Lady Anne Lennox; 24 June 1703
- Died: 20 October 1789 (aged 86)
- Spouse: William Anne Keppel, 2nd Earl of Albemarle (m. 1722; died 1754)
- Children: George Keppel, 3rd Earl of Albemarle; Augustus Keppel, 1st Viscount Keppel; Hon. William Keppel; Hon. Frederick Keppel; Lady Caroline Adair; Elizabeth Russell, Marchioness of Tavistock
- Parent(s): Charles Lennox, 1st Duke of Richmond; Anne Brudenell
- Relatives: Charles II of England (paternal grandfather)

Anne van Keppel (née Lennox; 24 June 1703 – 20 October 1789) was a British court official and noble, the daughter of the 1st Duke of Richmond and Anne Brudenell. Her father Charles was an illegitimate child of King Charles II, thus making her the king's granddaughter.

== Marriage and children ==
On 21 February 1722, she married the 2nd Earl of Albemarle at Caversham, Oxfordshire (now Berkshire), whereupon she became Countess of Albemarle. She was mother to six children:

- George Keppel, 3rd Earl of Albemarle (1724–1772)
- Augustus Keppel, 1st Viscount Keppel (1725–1786)
- Lt.-Gen. Hon. William Keppel (1727–1782)
- Rt. Rev. Hon. Frederick Keppel (1728–1777)
- Lady Caroline Keppel (1734–1769), who married Robert Adair
- Lady Elizabeth Keppel (1739–1768), who married Francis Russell, Marquess of Tavistock.

From 1725 to 1737, she was a Lady of the Bedchamber to Queen Caroline. Anne died in 1789 at Admiralty House aged 86.

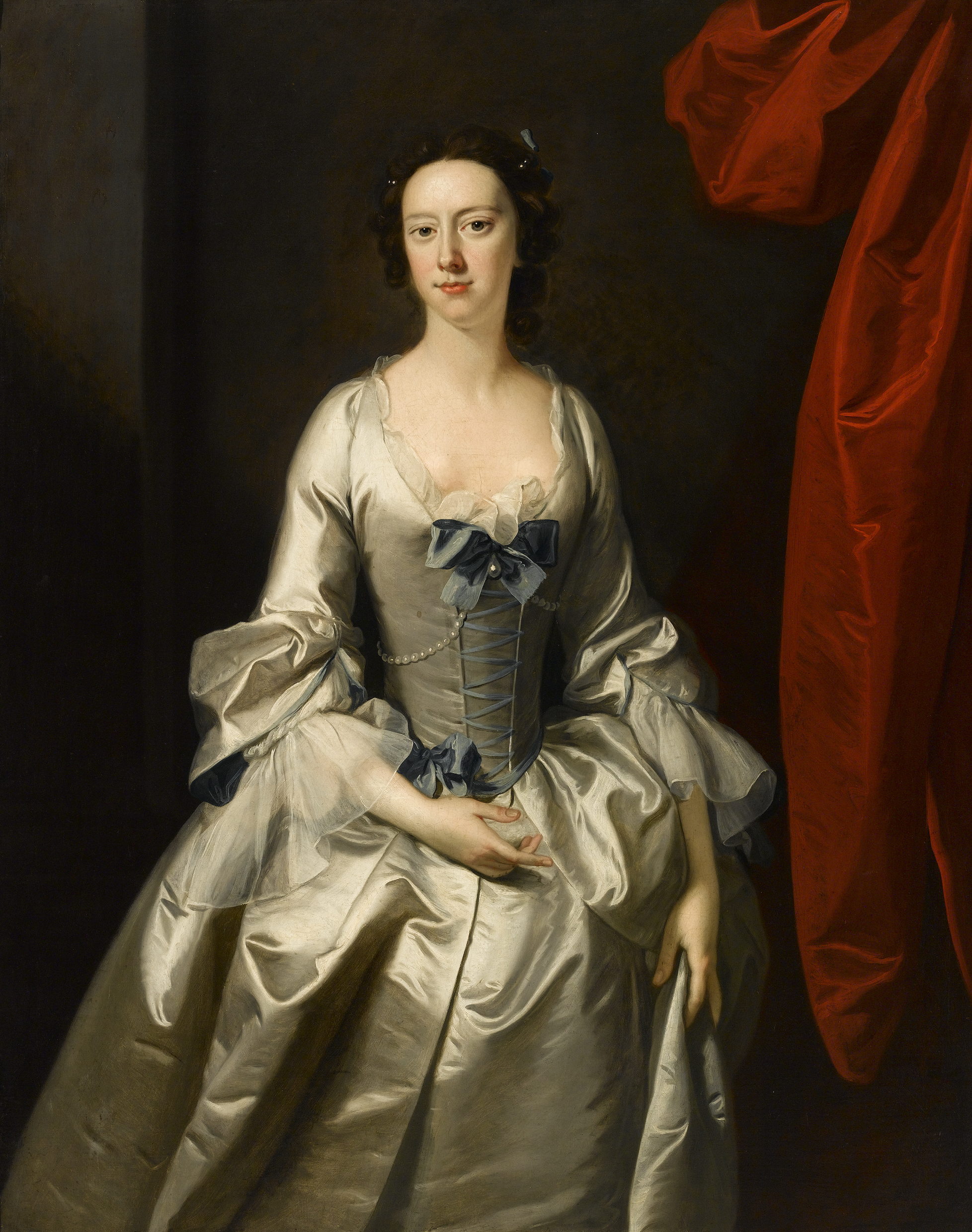
This portrait of Anne by Thomas Hudson is a pendant to that of her husband, William Anne Keppel, 2nd Earl of Albemarle.

== Philanthropy ==
The Countess was 'one of 21 ladies of quality and distinction' who signed a petition in 1735 calling for the establishment of the Foundling Hospital in London, UK. The petition was presented to King George II by philanthropist Thomas Coram and although it was initially rejected, it was instrumental in gaining further support for the children's home which was granted a royal charter in 1739.

== Ancestry ==
Ancestors of Anne van Keppel, Countess of Albemarle

8. Charles I of England
4. Charles II of England
9. Henrietta Maria of France
2. Charles Lennox, 1st Duke of Richmond
10. Guillaume de Penancoët de Keroual
5. Louise de Kérouaille, Duchess of Portsmouth
11. Marie de Plœuc
1. Anne van Keppel, Countess of Albemarle
12. Robert Brudenell, 2nd Earl of Cardigan
6. Francis Brudenell, Lord Brudenell
13. Anne Savage
3. Anne Brudenell
14. Thomas Savile, 1st Earl of Sussex
7. Frances Savile
15. Anne Villiers
