= Charles Lennox, 1st Duke of Richmond =

Illegitimate son of Charles II of England (1672–1723)

His Grace The Duke of Richmond and Lennox KG
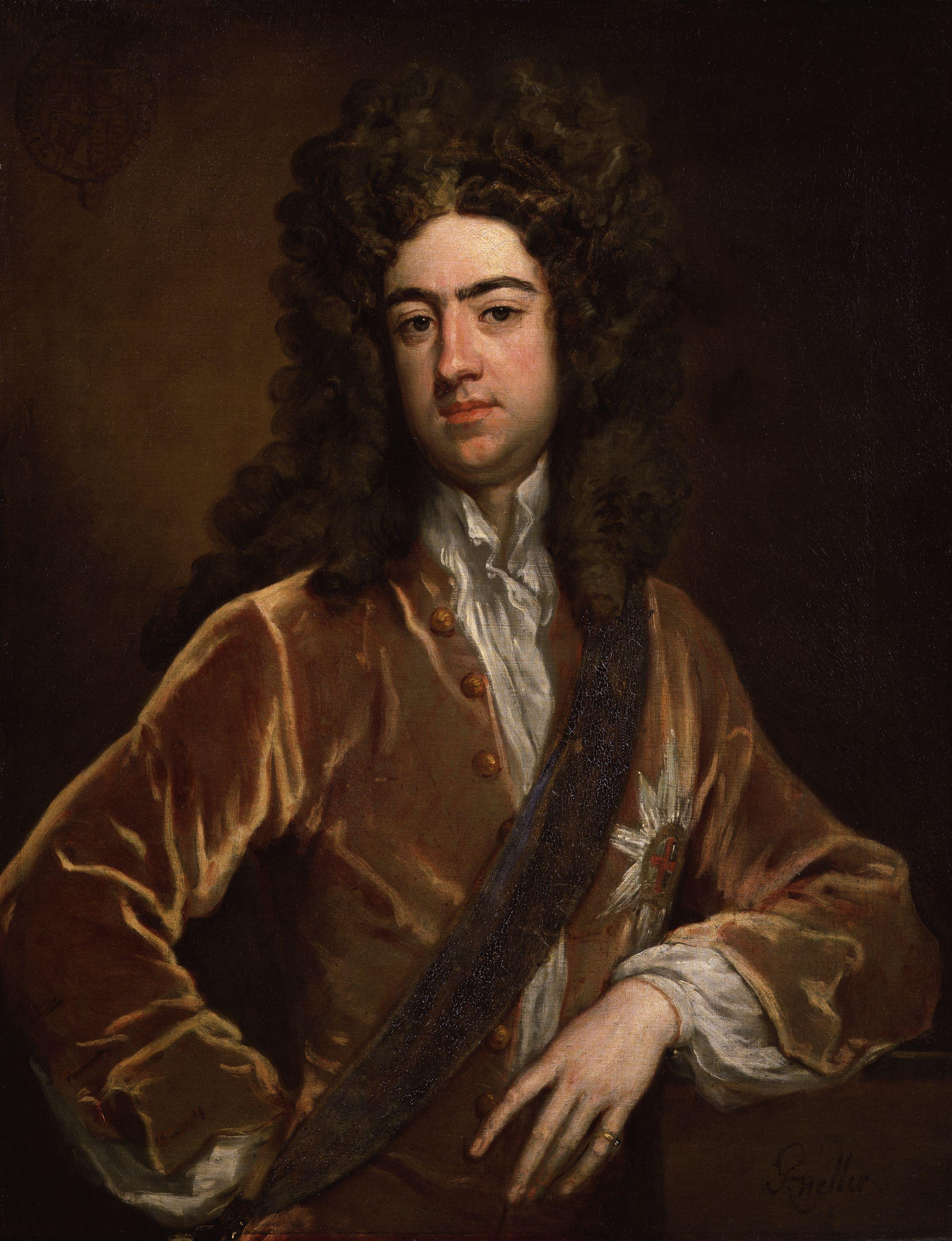
- Portrait by Sir Godfrey Kneller
- Tenure: 9 August 1675 – 27 May 1723
- Successor: Charles Lennox, 2nd Duke of Richmond
- Other titles: 1st Duke of Lennox (Scotland); 1st Earl of March (England); 1st Earl of Darnley (Scotland); 1st Baron Settrington (England); 1st Lord Torbolton (Scotland); 1st Duke of Aubigny (France)
- Born: 29 July 1672; London, England
- Died: 27 May 1723 (aged 50); Sussex, England
- Spouse: Anne Brudenell
- Issue: Charles Lennox, 2nd Duke of Richmond; Louisa Lennox, Countess of Berkeley; Anne Lennox, Countess of Albemarle
- Parents: King Charles II of England; Louise de Kérouaille, Duchess of Portsmouth (mistress)

Arms of Charles Lennox, 1st Duke of Richmond, 1st Duke of Lennox: Royal Arms of Charles II the whole within a bordure compony argent and gules charged with eight roses of the second barbed and seeded.

Charles Lennox, 1st Duke of Richmond, 1st Duke of Lennox KG (29 July 1672 – 27 May 1723), of Goodwood House near Chichester in Sussex, was the youngest of the seven illegitimate sons of King Charles II, and was that king's only son by his French-born mistress Louise de Kérouaille, Duchess of Portsmouth. He was appointed Hereditary Constable of Inverness Castle.

On his mother's side, he was descended from the Seigneurs of the Château de Kéroual, a castle built in the 16th century in Kerouat-Bihan, Guilers, Finistère, Brittany, France, as well as the House of Plœuc and Kergorlay noble family of Brittany.

== Titles ==
Various titles became eligible for re-grant following the death in 1672 of King Charles II's childless 4th cousin (both being descended in the male line from John Stewart, 3rd Earl of Lennox, the paternal grandfather of Henry Stewart, Lord Darnley, father of King James I of England) Charles Stewart, 3rd Duke of Richmond, 6th Duke of Lennox (1639–1672), KG, 12th Seigneur d'Aubigny in France, of Cobham Hall in Kent and of Richmond House in Whitehall, London.

This Anglicised branch of the Scottish family of "Stewart of Darnley" had been beloved by King James I & VI, whose favourite had been the Franco-Scottish Esmé Stewart, 1st Duke of Lennox, 1st Earl of Lennox (1542–1583), 7th Seigneur d'Aubigny, his father's first cousin (and great-grandfather of the last in the male line Charles Stewart, 3rd Duke of Richmond, 6th Duke of Lennox).

Thus, the Lennox and Richmond titles and the French Seigneurie d'Aubigny (effectively the lordship of the manor of the Château d'Aubigny in Aubigny-sur-Nère) held special significance for the Stuart monarchs. Moreover, the title Earl of Richmond had merged into the crown on the accession to the throne in 1485 of King Henry VII, formerly Earl of Richmond, and the Scottish title Earl of Lennox had merged into the crown of Great Britain, as King James I of England and VI of Scotland was effectively the 5th Earl of Lennox, being the heir of his paternal grandfather Matthew Stewart, 4th Earl of Lennox.

On 9 August 1675, King Charles II's illegitimate son (by Louise de Kérouaille) who had been given the surname "Lennox", was created Duke of Richmond, Earl of March, and Baron Settrington in the Peerage of England; and on 9 September 1675, he was created Duke of Lennox, Earl of Darnley, and Baron Methuen of Torbolten in the Peerage of Scotland. He was invested as a Knight of the Garter on 18 April 1681. In 1684, at the request of King Charles II, the French King Louis XIV created Louise de Kérouaille "Duchesse d'Aubigny" in the Peerage of France, with remainder to her descendants.

As the 1st Duke predeceased his mother, he never held the French dukedom, which was however inherited by his son, the duchess's grandson. He was appointed Lord High Admiral of Scotland, under reservation of the commission granted to James, Duke of Albany and York (later James VII), as Lord High Admiral for life. The appointment was therefore only effective between 1701 and 1705, when Lennox resigned all of his Scottish lands and offices.

He was Master of a Lodge in Chichester in 1696, and so was one of the few known seventeenth-century freemasons. His son followed him into the Freemasons.

== Marriage and issue ==
On 8 January 1692 he married Anne Brudenell (d. 9 December 1722), a daughter of Francis Brudenell, Lord Brudenell (d. 1698), eldest son and heir apparent of Robert Brudenell, 2nd Earl of Cardigan. By his wife he had one son and two daughters:

- Charles Lennox, 2nd Duke of Richmond, 2nd Duke of Lennox, 2nd Duc d'Aubigny (1701–1750), son and heir, known during his father's lifetime by the courtesy title of Earl of March;
- Lady Louisa Lennox (Countess of Berkeley), who married James Berkeley, 3rd Earl of Berkeley;
- Lady Anne Lennox (Countess of Albemarle), who married Willem van Keppel, 2nd Earl of Albemarle.

== Patron of cricket ==
He was a patron of the game of cricket, then becoming a leading professional sport, and did much to develop it in Sussex. It is almost certain that he was involved with the earliest known "great match", which took place in the 1697 season and was the first to be reported by the press. The report was in the Foreign Post dated Wednesday, 7 July 1697:

"The middle of last week a great match at cricket was played in Sussex; there were eleven of a side, and they played for fifty guineas apiece".

The stakes on offer confirm the importance of the fixture and the fact that it was eleven-a-side suggests that two strong and well-balanced teams were assembled. No other details were given but the report provides evidence that cricket, in the form of "great matches" played for high stakes, was in vogue at the time. It was possibly an inter-county match: i.e., Sussex versus Kent or Surrey. Richmond sponsored a team, now known as the 1st Duke of Richmond's XI, in the 1702 season against Arundel. His son Charles Lennox, 2nd Duke of Richmond inherited his interest in cricket, and became a patron of both the Sussex and Slindon teams.

== Death and burial ==
He died on 27 May 1723 and was buried on 7 June 1723 in the Richmond Chapel (Henry VII Chapel) of Westminster Abbey, which chapel had been built by King Henry VII, formerly Earl of Richmond. His body was reinterred on 16 August 1750 in the Lady Chapel of Chichester Cathedral in Sussex.

== Legacy ==
Richmond County, New York (coextensive with Staten Island), and Richmond County, Virginia, were named after Charles Lennox, whilst other US counties called "Richmond" were named after later Dukes.

Through his daughter, Anne, he is an ancestor of Queen Camilla of the United Kingdom and through both Anne and his elder son of the late Diana, Princess of Wales.

== Arms ==
Coat of arms of Charles Lennox, 1st Duke of Richmond
Coronet A Coronet of a Duke Crest On a chapeau Gules turned up Ermine a lion statant guardant Or crowned with a Ducal Coronet Gules and gorged with a Collar compony of four pieces Argent and Gules charged with two roses of the last; (Richmond crest with Lennox collar and coronet). Escutcheon The Royal Arms of King Charles II of England (viz. quarterly: 1st and 4th, France and England quarterly; 2nd, Scotland; 3rd, Ireland); the whole within a Bordure compony Argent charged with Roses Gules barbed and seeded proper and the last. Supporters Dexter: A unicorn Argent armed, crined and unguled Or, gorged with a Collar company as the crest. Sinister: An antelope Argent, also armed, crined and unguled Or, gorged with a Collar company as the crest. Motto En la rose je fleuris (French: "Like the rose, I flourish")

== Bibliography ==
- McCann, Tim (2004). Sussex Cricket in the Eighteenth Century. Sussex Record Society.

Political offices
In commission Title last held by The Duke of Monmouth	Master of the Horse; 1681–1685	Succeeded by The Lord Dartmouth
Preceded by King James VII	Lord High Admiral of Scotland; 1701–1705	Succeeded by The Marquess of Montrose
Peerage of England
New creation	Duke of Richmond; 3rd creation 1675–1723	Succeeded by Charles Lennox
Peerage of Scotland
New creation	Duke of Lennox; 2nd creation 1675–1723	Succeeded by Charles Lennox
French nobility
New creation	Duke of Aubigny; 1684–1723	Succeeded by Charles Lennox
