= Seton =

Seton may refer to:

== People ==
- Seton (surname), people with the surname Seton
- Seton Airlie (1920–2008), Scottish professional footballer
- Seton Beresford (1868–1928), English first-class cricketer
- Seton Daunt, guitar player and songwriter
- Seton Gordon (1886–1977), Scottish naturalist, photographer, and folklorist
- Seton I. Miller (1902–1974), Hollywood screenwriter and producer
- Seton Pringle (1879–1955), Irish surgeon

== Places ==
=== Scotland ===
- Port Seton, a town in East Lothian, Scotland
- Seton Collegiate Church, an ancient monument south east of Cockenzie and Port Seton
- Seton Sands, an area of coastline east of Edinburgh
- Seton Palace, East Lothian, Scotland, rebuilt by Robert Seton, 2nd Earl of Winton

=== Canada ===
- Seton, Calgary, a neighbourhood in Calgary, Alberta, Canada
- Seton Lake, British Columbia
- Seton Portage, British Columbia, often referred to simply as "Seton" (which in that form can include nearby Shalalth, British Columbia)
- Seton River, British Columbia, connecting Seton Lake to Cayoosh Creek and the Fraser River at the town of Lillooet
  - Seton Dam, a dam on the Seton River
  - Seton Canal, a diversion of the flow of the Seton River from Seton Dam
- Seton Portage Historic Provincial Park, Seton Portage, British Columbia
- Seton Powerhouse, a hydroelectric generating station on the Fraser River

=== United States ===
- Seton Family of Hospitals, a Roman Catholic-affiliated hospital system in the Central Texas area
- Seton Hall University, a university in South Orange, New Jersey
- Seton High School (disambiguation), any number of high schools with this or a similar name
- Seton Medical Center, a hospital in Daly City, California
- Seton Village, New Mexico

== Other ==
- Seton stitch, used for healing fistulae
- Seton Lake Indian Band, a First Nations band government at Seton Lake, British Columbia
- Patrick "Seton" O'Connor, producer of The Dan Patrick Show
- Seton Company, an automotive leather company
- a trade name for the drug Ondansetron
- Seton Identification Products, a supplier of safety, labeling and signage products

== See also ==
- Seaton (disambiguation)
