= Seaton =

Seaton can refer to:

== Places ==
=== Australia ===
- Seaton, South Australia
- Seaton, Victoria

=== Canada ===
- Seaton, Ontario

=== England ===
- Seaton, Cornwall
- Seaton, County Durham
- Seaton, Cumbria
- Seaton, Devon
- Seaton, East Riding of Yorkshire
- Seaton, Rutland

=== United States ===
- Seaton, Illinois

== People ==
- Alexander Seaton (1626–1649), Scottish soldier
- Andy Seaton (born 1977), Scottish footballer
- Brad Seaton (born 1993), American football player
- Fred A. Seaton (1909–1974), United States Secretary of the Interior, 1956–1961
- George Seaton (1911–1979), American playwright and film director
- Gordon Seaton (born 1945), Scottish footballer
- Jordan Seaton (born 2004), American football player
- M. J. Seaton (1923–2007), British physicist
- Philippa Seaton, New Zealand professor of nursing
- Thomas Seaton (1684–1781), British clergyman and benefactor
- Thomas Seaton Scott (1826–1895), British-born Canadian architect
- Seaton Schroeder (1849–1922), American admiral

== Railway stations ==
- Seaton railway station (Cornwall), England
- Seaton (Cumbria) railway station, England
- Seaton (Devon) railway station, England
- Seaton railway station (Rutland), England

== Other ==
- Seaton (South Boston, Virginia), U.S., a historic house
- Baron Seaton, a British title
- Seaton's, a boarding house of Upper Canada College, Toronto

== See also ==
- Seton (disambiguation)
