= Tranent to Cockenzie Waggonway =

Former railway line in Scotland

Coordinates: 55.96°N 2.96°W

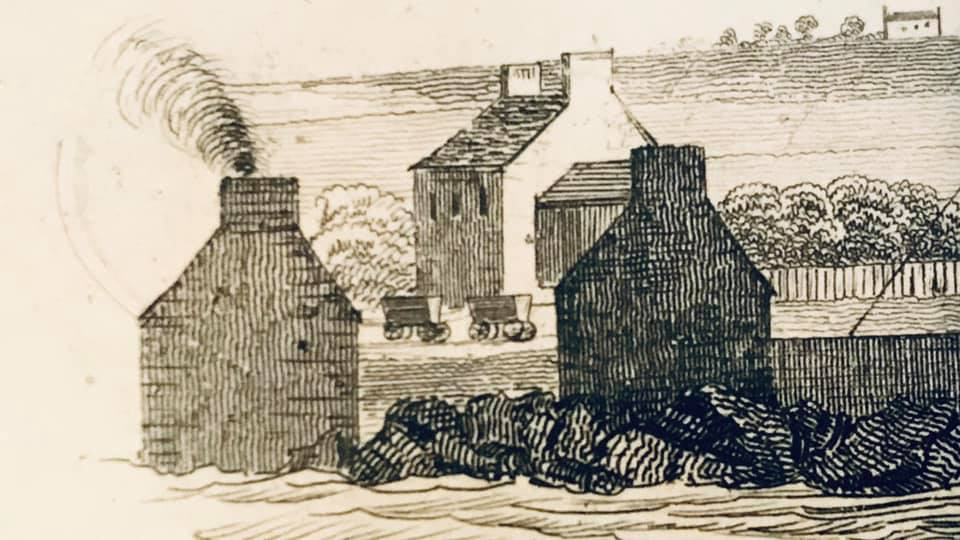
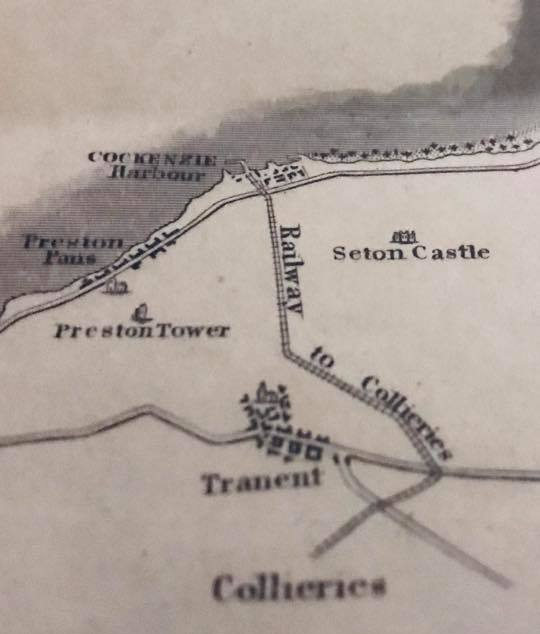
Tranent to Cockenzie Waggonway on an engraving by J. Gellatly (ca.1840)

The Tranent to Cockenzie Waggonway was an early waggonway, possibly the first in Scotland, opened in 1722. It was 2 1/2 miles (4 km) long and connected coal pits at Tranent with the salt pans at Cockenzie and harbour at Port Seton in East Lothian. The track was wooden, and wagons were drawn by horses. The Battle of Prestonpans in 1745 was fought across the line.

It was converted to use iron rails in 1815, and was connected to the new main line North British Railway from 1846, later becoming superseded by a branch line of that railway. A section of the original line of route was still in railway use until 1968. Some of the route can be traced at the present day.

== History ==
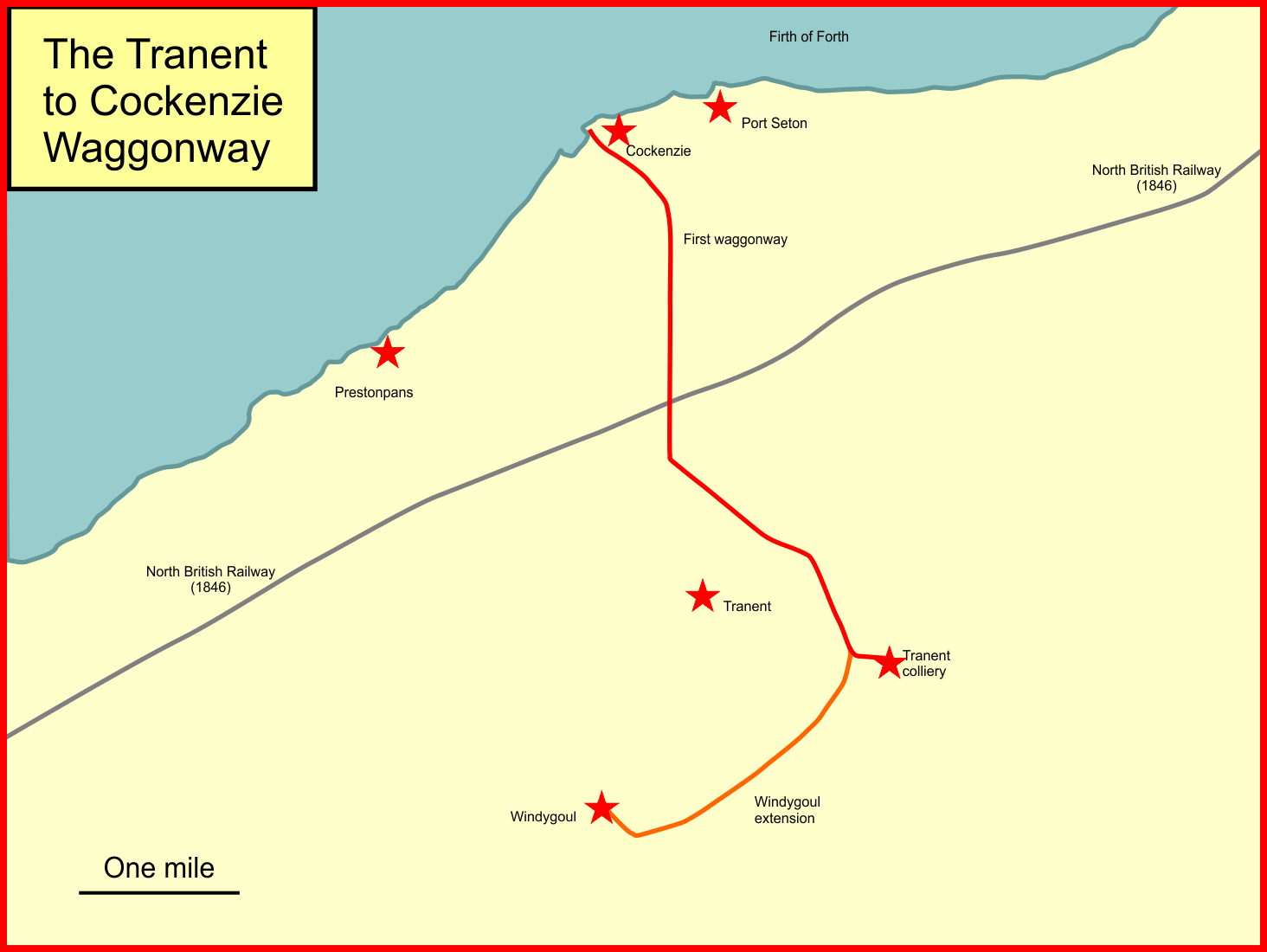
Map of the Tranent waggonway

Before the 18th century, salt production on the shore of the Firth of Forth was a considerable activity; salt water was evaporated in salt pans. This required considerable quantities of coal, and this formed the largest demand for coal in this period. It was initially possible to extract coal close to the salt pans, but these deposits were soon worked out and coal had to be transported from a more remote location.

The landowner, the Earl of Winton, supported the Old Pretender in the Jacobite Rebellion of 1715 and as a result his estates were forfeit to the Crown. They were later acquired by the York Buildings Company of London, in 1719. Following a series of financial speculations, the company became the largest in Scotland, but (because of the difficulty of communication) it found it difficult to manage its business. It resolved the problem by leasing local businesses to tenants, providing incentives for them to improve their holdings.

This resulted in improvements taking place at Port Seton harbour. (Note: Port Seton (or Port Seaton) harbour was a small exposed place 1 mile (1.6 km) east of Cockenzie harbour.) The waggonway connected the harbour to salt pans at Cockenzie (Note: The source which states that the Waggonway was connected to the salt works at Preston was written a century and a half after the waggonway was built - it is clear that the line only connected with the salt works at Cockenzie, on its way from the Tranent Pits to Port Seton Harbour.) and the coal pits at Tranent. The cost of all the works was £3,500, completed in 1722. This original wooden railway followed a route along what is now School Lane in Cockenzie, before heading eastwards along the High Street to Port Seton Harbour. (Note: Title deeds from New Street in Cockenzie detail the precise route that the early waggonway took through the town to Port Seton Harbour. The later iron railway followed a different route at Cockenzie and headed to the western harbour at Cockenzie. Volunteer archaeologists uncovered there in 2017 a salt house, a wooden sleeper and some support blocks made from stone and presented their finds to more than 1000 visitors. On 1–8 September 2018 they found an intact turntable ring, salt pan flue system, remnants of a tipper mechanism, a 2.4m deep loading bay and datable pottery from the 1600s.) Photographs of the waggons used (circa 1854) have been discovered at Cockenzie House, showing a waggonway similar to Shropshire design being used. (Note: The photos of the Waggonway at Cockenzie Harbour in 1854 by Gen. Sir Robert Cadell, are some of the earliest photographs of a railway or waggonway in existence. They can be viewed at Cockenzie House.)

The railway used small wagons in short trains, and the smaller track gauge indicates the influence of Shropshire waggonway designs. (Note: Lewis says, page 255, "The traditional date of 1722 is probably correct: it was certainly before 1736.")

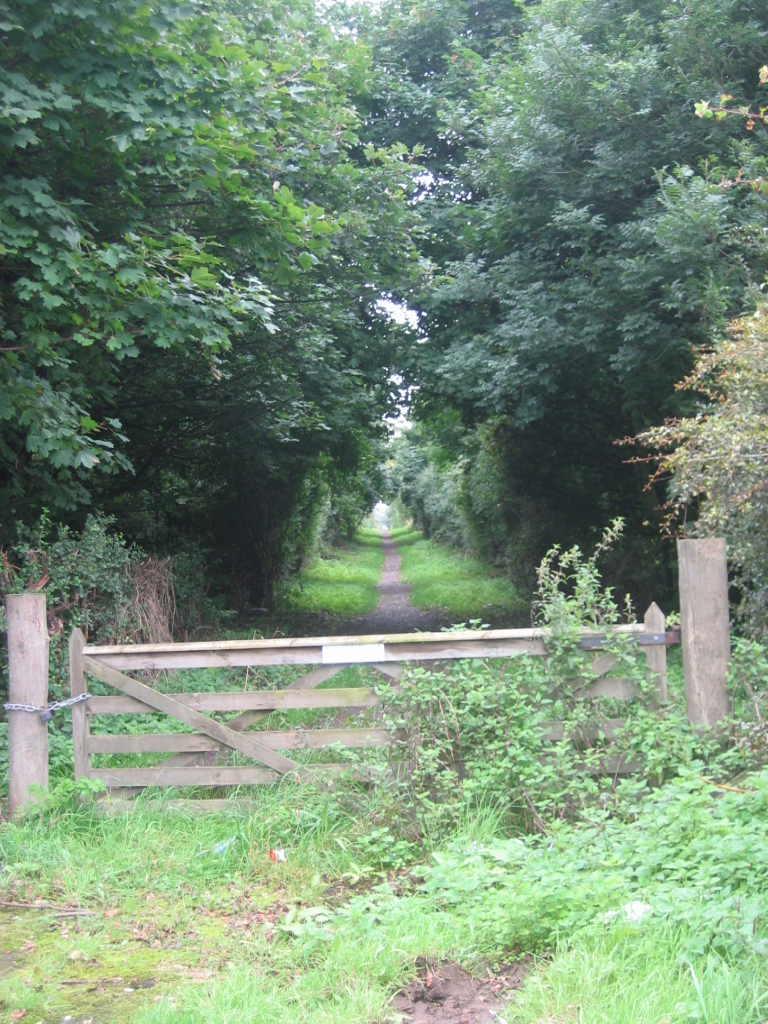
Route of the Waggonway, near Tranent Church

The track gauge was 3 ft 3 in (991 mm); the wagons could carry one Scots chalder — 30 long cwt (3,400 lb or 1,500 kg) — and the wagon ends were removable for unloading.

The installation was let to William Adam for £1,000 per annum. The rent was halved in 1733, reflecting Adam's lack of success in making a profit. He was unable to continue even at this lower rent, and he gave up the lease. Other tenants tried their hand, also without success.

In 1745 the railway was the scene of part of the Battle of Prestonpans, during the Jacobite rising of 1745. The forces of Charles Edward Stuart, Bonnie Prince Charlie were advancing southwards, and the opposing forces of Sir John Cope brought them to battle. On 20 September 1745 Cope's troops and artillery ranged along the waggonway. Dendy Marshall says that they used an embankment formed for the railway as cover. Bonnie Prince Charlie cut through Cope's forces, and put them to flight.

The York Buildings Company was sequestered in 1777, and in 1779 the former Winton estate was sold to the Cadell family.

The offer for sale declared that: "There is still an extensive field of coal, whereof no part has hitherto been wrought by fire engine or other proper machinery. The whole of the coal lies at a small distance from the sea. The port and harbour of Seaton make part of the estate to be sold; and there is a waggon-way from the coal-pits to the salt-pans and the shore."

It was stipulated that: "The waggon-way is to be communicated to the purchasers in Lots 2d [2nd] and 3d [3rd] of Tranent, and a liberty reserved, on paying damages, to carry the waggon-way through the links of Seaton to the harbour of Port-Seaton, in the direction it formerly went, when the coal was wrought for the Company's account."

Worling concludes: "Obviously, the lower part of the waggonway, as originally built, had been allowed to fall into disuse by the tenant... Clearly, in these early times, horses were used to haul the waggons. It may be that gravity was used in the downward direction, as happened later, but it is impossible to ascertain how free running the crude vehicles were. Even allowing for intervening changes in the landscape, an inspection of the route today reveals that the gradient on some parts of the route is slight, and in one place is even uphill against the general lie of the land (around Meadowhill)."

Robertson's earlier view is not entirely the same: "The line was built to give a steady downhill gradient to the sea, even though this required the construction of a substantial embankment, so that loaded trains of waggons could be sent down by gravity under the control of a brakesman, and horses would only be required for returning the empties."

The line was single, with two passing places.

== Conversion to edge rails ==
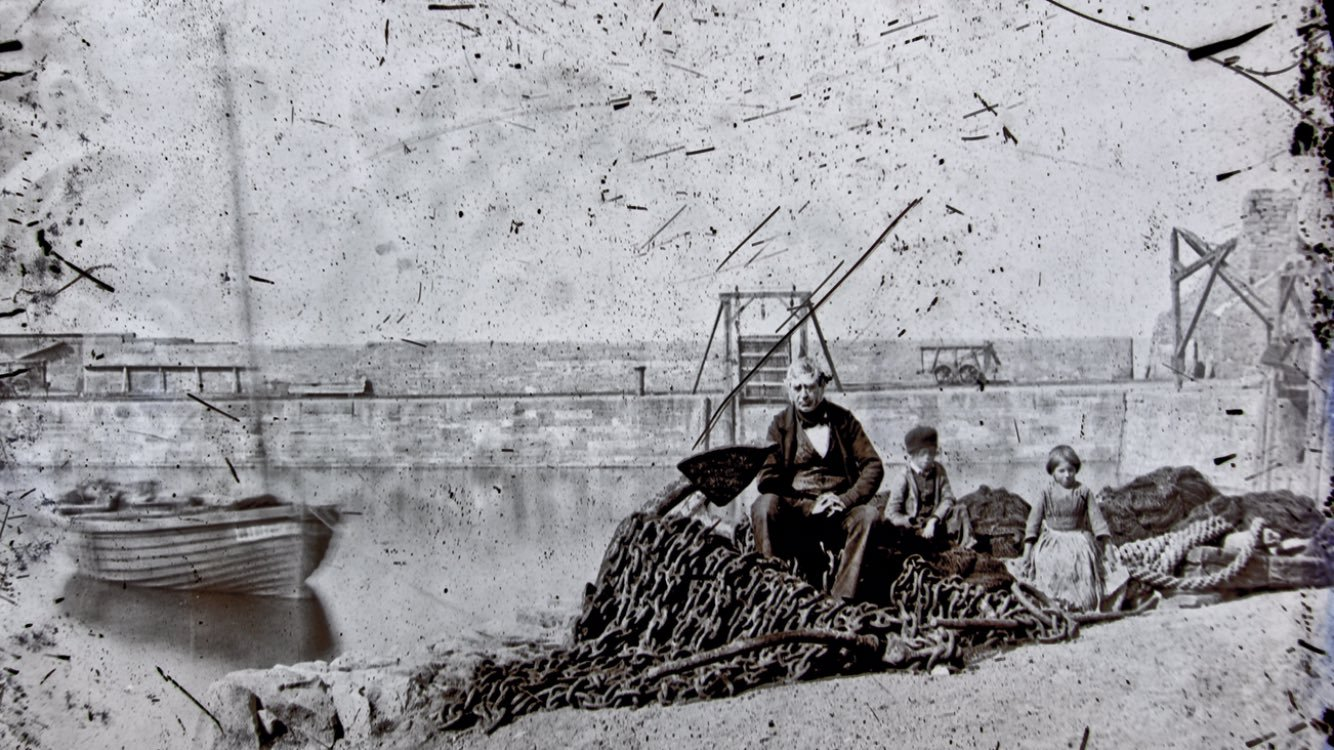
The Waggonway at Cockenzie Harbour in the background on a photo of Sir Robert Cadell, 1854

In 1815 the wooden track system was altered to use cast iron fish bellied (Note: Discovery of grooves between in situ sleeper blocks to accommodate the underside of the rails in the quayside at Cockenzie by E. Bethune and A. Braby have confirmed the existence of fish belly design.) edge rails, retaining a single line with passing places. Alexander Scott described it in 1824:

Mr Cadell's waggons travel from his coal-works, in Tranent Moor, to Cockenzie, a distance of upwards of 4,480 yards, on a cast-iron railway, that has various declivities and circular turns; and require only the assistance of a man, in the downward journey, to attend to the several brakes attached to the waggons. The breadth of the horse-track is 3 feet 3 inches; the waggons, when loaded, including their carriages, are each about 2 tons. A horse sometimes takes up 5 empty waggons, but the common number is 4, and these he commonly drags three times a day.

In 1833 Cockenzie Harbour was substantially reconstructed by the civil engineer Robert Stevenson. At about this time the waggonway was extended southwards to coal pits at Windygoul.

In 1844 the North British Railway was authorised to build its main line from Edinburgh to Berwick. This opened in 1846, and it intersected the route of the waggon-way, which was provided with a bridge to carry it over the new line.

== Main line connection ==
Also in 1846 the North British Railway secured the North British Railway Act 1845 (8 & 9 Vict. c. lxxxii), authorising a branch from its main line at Bankton, a little to the west, to Tranent and Windygoul; the branch line opened in 1849. The line was relaid with wrought iron rails, probably in the 1850s.

Cadell was able to take advantage of the construction of the main line railway, as it enabled his coal to be transported more cheaply; he arranged for transshipment sidings at both Meadowmill and at Windygoul. The track gauge of his waggonway prevented through running, and obviously a direct connection from the North British Railway (NBR) was considerably superior. Transport of the coal by coastal shipping from Cockenzie Harbour declined, and the lower part of the waggonway, north of the Meadowmill connection with the NBR, soon became disused and was later dismantled. The upper part continued to flourish, and for another 30 years it carried the Tranent coal down to the main line railway.

About 1880 the coal merchant James Waldie took over the lease of the Tranent collieries and the waggonway. The waggonway was rebuilt as a standard-gauge railway with steam locomotives, and a junction was made with the North British Railway at Meadowmill. At this period Cockenzie Harbour was no longer much used due to the larger vessels then in use being unable to berth there, but for a period an exchange siding was made at Meadowmill, and the waggonway wagons were tipped into main line wagons for onward transport, generally to Leith.

Twenty years later James Waldie and the other leading East Lothian coalmasters combined to form the Edinburgh Collieries Co. Ltd. The railway branch line, partly on the alignment of the earlier waggonway, was extended to Fleets Colliery. (Dott dates the "final uprooting" of the original line to "about 1896". The usage as a modern railway continued until the closure of Fleets Colliery in 1959.

Above Meadowmill, a section of the original waggonway was subsequently used as a storage siding for National Coal Board coal wagons in the 1960s; this part of the route had therefore been in railway use for about 240 years.

== Archaeology ==
In 1994 an archaeological assessment was undertaken along a new proposed route of the A1 between Tranent and Haddington. The assessment was overseen by Scotia Archaeology Limited and involved fieldwalking, excavation, and geophysical survey, as well as a watching brief in the following year. Although there was no indication of the presence of the waggonway before excavation, the proposed route cut across the waggonway in Area 2 (NT 405 736). A trench measuring 25 metres by 5 metres was dug across the line of the railway and two sets of wheel ruts beneath the rail bed deposits, which may indicate that the waggonway was built on top of an earlier cart track.

In March 1999 an archeological evaluation was undertaken at Tranent Mains Farm in preparation of proposing a housing development, which was located over a stretch of the waggonway. 46 machine-cut trenches were opened in the development site, and two were excavated over the waggonway. The deposits that made up the rail bed were identified and recorded. Iron spikes were also found, and were likely discarded when the waggonway was dismantled. It was discovered that trenches dating to the mid-20th century for water and sewerage pipes had disturbed and partially destroyed the remains of the waggonway. In September 2001 another programme of archeological work was undertaken at the site of the housing development at Tranent Mains Farm to investigating possible medieval features encountered in 1999. In the eastern section of the evaluation area three trenches were opened area across the what, based on an OS map from 1854, was the line of the Cockenzie Waggonway. These trenches revealed in-situ railbed material dating to the 19th and 20th centuries. Below these later railbeds the remains of an earlier buried surface, possibly part of the earlier 18th century waggonway, were found.

In recent years the 1722 Waggonway Heritage Group has undertaken a series of excavations to better understand the history of the railway and associated sites. In 2017 excavations were undertaken near Cockenzie Harbour. The flagged surface of the harbour, constructed in 1830 by Robert Stevenson, was revealed. Multiple iron chairs that would have held the iron rails were found in situ, as well as grooves carved into the flagged surface of the harbour that the iron rails would have slotted into. Many of the settings where the chairs were bolted to the flagstone surface of the harbour were found. Some of these settings consisted of rectangular depressions where the base of the chairs would have been inset into the flagstones. These remains would have been part of Cadell's 1850 iron railway. The remains of the turntable were found by the quayside, identifiable by the curved edges of large stones that would have sat around the perimeter of the turntable and part of the iron runner that the turntable would have sat upon. At the time of excavation it was believed that only the partial remains of the turntable had been found and that a majority of the structure had been destroyed by a modern pipe trench. The remains of the tipping mechanism where the carts were tipped and the coal was loaded onto boats in the harbour were also identified.

In 2018 excavation at Cockenzie Harbour was continued. In the infill of the pan house parts of the wrought iron fish-bellied rails were found. Excavation of the turntable was continued in 2018, and it was revealed that the turntable was still intact. A metal rod that acted as the central pivot point was set into a large round stone. An iron runner ran around the perimeter of the stone and was bolted to the stone. The turntable would have sat on top of the stone with a set of rails running across it where the waggons would be rolled onto the turntable and then transferred to the tipping mechanism nearby. Excavation of the tipping mechanism began in 2018. The surface that the tipping mechanism would have stood on was excavated and the iron fittings of tipping mechanism were found set into a large stone. The remains of large wooden beams were found between these fittings and the adjacent stone wall. Nearby a shaft 2.3 metres deep was found. The bottom third of this shaft had been dug out into the bedrock. Because of its depth it likely had a wooden lid. The infill of the bottom third of the shaft is coal particles. From the shaft there is a channel that goes down 1.7 metres towards the harbour. The difference in depth between the shaft and the channel indicates that there was likely some mechanism that would have been used to transfer coal to boats in the harbour, though the nature of this mechanism is unknown.

In 2019 exploratory excavations were undertaken at a public footpath follows the waggonway, where it was theorised that the original railway could be found underneath the path of the later iron railway. The remains of the original wooden rails were found in situ. These wooden rails were made of 5-inch-wide (130 mm) timbers and the gauge was 4 ft (1,219 mm), significantly wider than the iron railway above, which had a gauge of 3 ft 3 in (991 mm). Infill consisting of local stones, coal dust, and clinkers was found between the rails.

In 2021, the site of the exploratory trenches dug in 2019 was more thoroughly investigated to gain a better understanding of the phases of use of the waggonway. It was discovered that there were three phases of wooden waggonway. The earliest phase dates to between 1722 and 1725 and consists of the remains of a wooden roadway and wooden rails. Long sleepers were placed occasionally used alongside regular sleeper beams. These long sleepers would have stabilised the railway where the ground was less stable; horses walked on the timber surface. The second phase dates to between 1728 and 1730 and was built on top of the earlier waggonway. The second phase of the waggonway was built with a wider gauge and a series of sleeper beams were laid along the sides of the waggonway. Between these sleeper beams was the walking surface, made of cobblestones. The rails were put on top of the sleeper beams, and the walking surface was further infilled with smaller cobbles and industrial waste. The third phase took place between 1743 and 1744, when the wooden waggonway was replaced once again. Over the years a hard packed surface made of small pieces of coals had built up on top of the cobblestone walkway from the second phase. The sleeper beams and rails were replaced using an almost identical gauge. Some of the hard packed surface was dug out to place a series of tie beams, which ran parallel to the rails and held the rails together. By 1815 the waggonway was updated and iron rails were added. Low stone walls were constructed on each side of the waggonway and the space between them was filled in with clay. The iron waggonway was built on top of the clay fill. Very little of the iron waggonway remains, as the parts were reused or recycled when it was deconstructed.

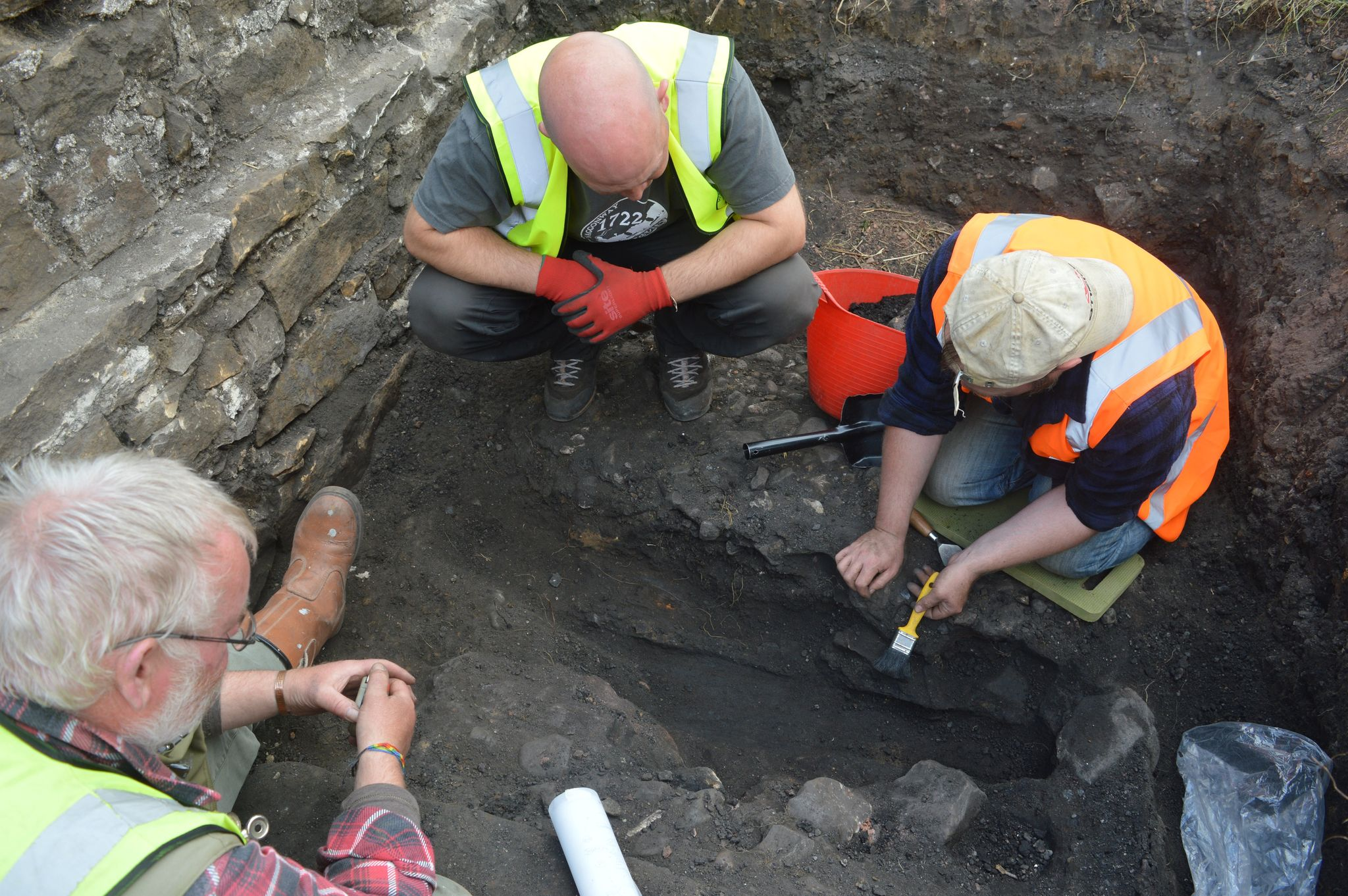
Volunteers with the 1722 Waggonway Heritage Group excavating the remains of the wooden waggonway in 2022

During the 2021 season two fragmented iron chairs that would have held the iron rails were found. Two parts of wrought iron fish-bellied were found. Remains of the metal rails are rare finds since a majority of these rails were taken to be reused in different sites or to be recycled when the metal railway was dismantled.

In 2022 an exploratory trench was dug at Winton Cottage in Cockenzie to locate part of the waggonway. It was expected that the edge of the waggonway would be found in the trench. A hard deposit flecked with small pieces of coal was found, which may be part of the waggonway. The deposit was truncated by a larger feature, which seems to be the remains of a pit. There is no evidence that gives a date for the creation of the pit, but it likely dates to the early 19th century.

== The present day ==
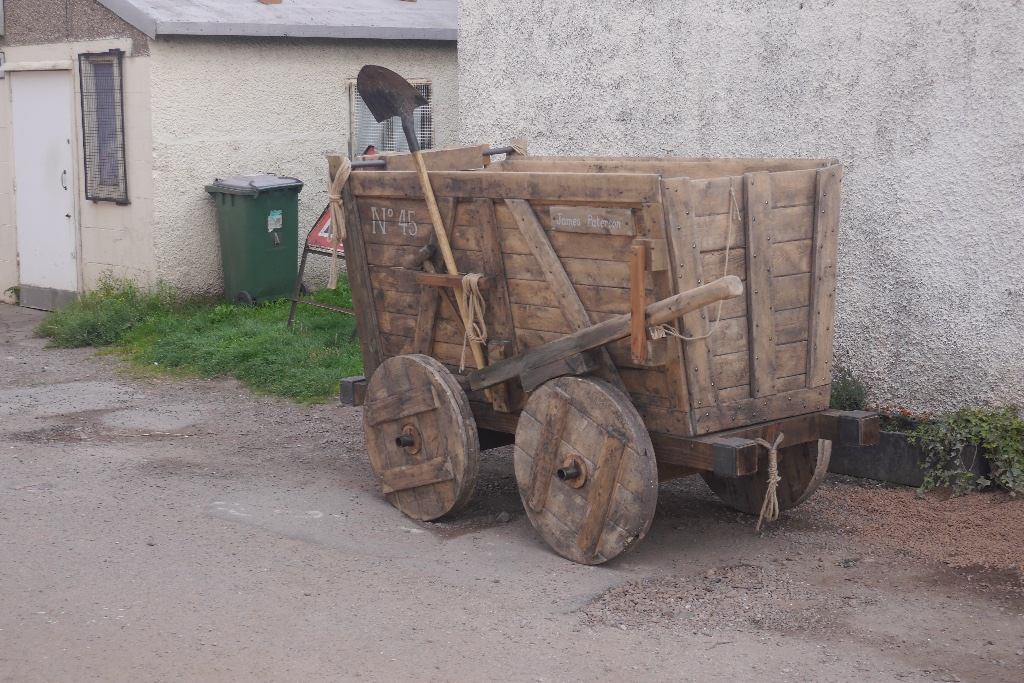
Replica coal wagon No.45 'James Paterson’ in West Harbour Road, Cockenzie, 2018

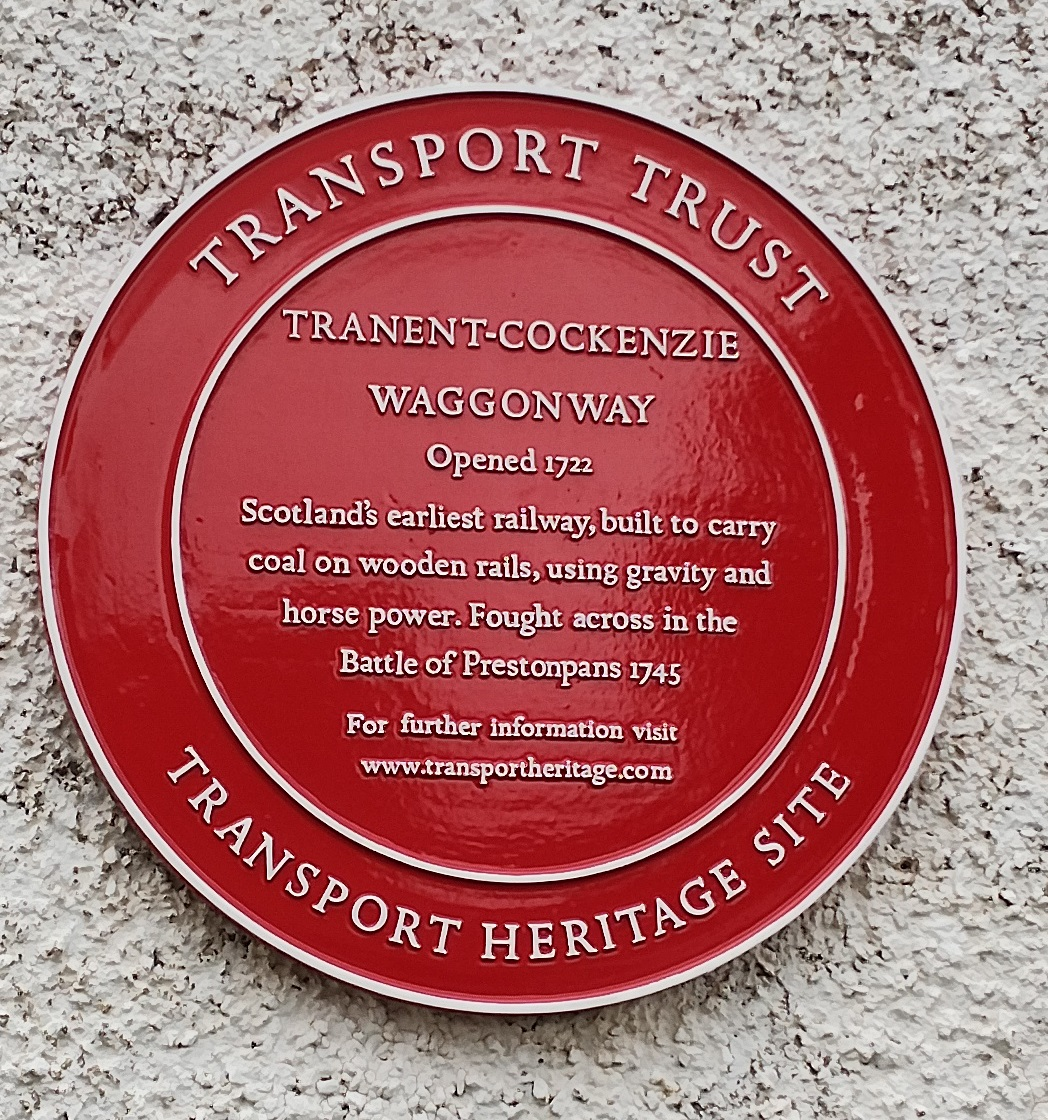
A National Transport Trust plaque marking the site of the waggonway

The alignment of the original waggonway can still be discerned in places. Part of its length is used as a public path by walkers, cyclists, and horse-riders.

There is a residential street in Tranent called The Waggonway (EH33 2QY). This is not on the line of the Tranent and Cockenzie line, but is near to the Windygoul pit on the extension.

At Cockenzie Harbour, in situ stone sleeper blocks and a turntable cavity & loading bay were discovered in 2017/2018, and further discoveries made in 2019, by the 1722 Waggonway Heritage Group, formed in 2017 to preserve and promote the route as a heritage asset. A mobile app, interpretation boards and way-marked signage are available to inform and educate walkers.

== See also ==
- Haytor Granite Tramway
