= Seton Castle =

Castle in East Lothian, Scotland

Coordinates: 55.96527°N 2.9335°W

Designations

Listed Building – Category A
- Official name: Seton Castle (formerly known as Seton House) with Retaining Terrace and Walls
- Designated: 4 February 1971
- Reference no.: LB19080

Inventory of Gardens and Designed Landscapes in Scotland
- Official name: Seton House (Palace)
- Designated: 30 June 1987
- Reference no.: GDL00340

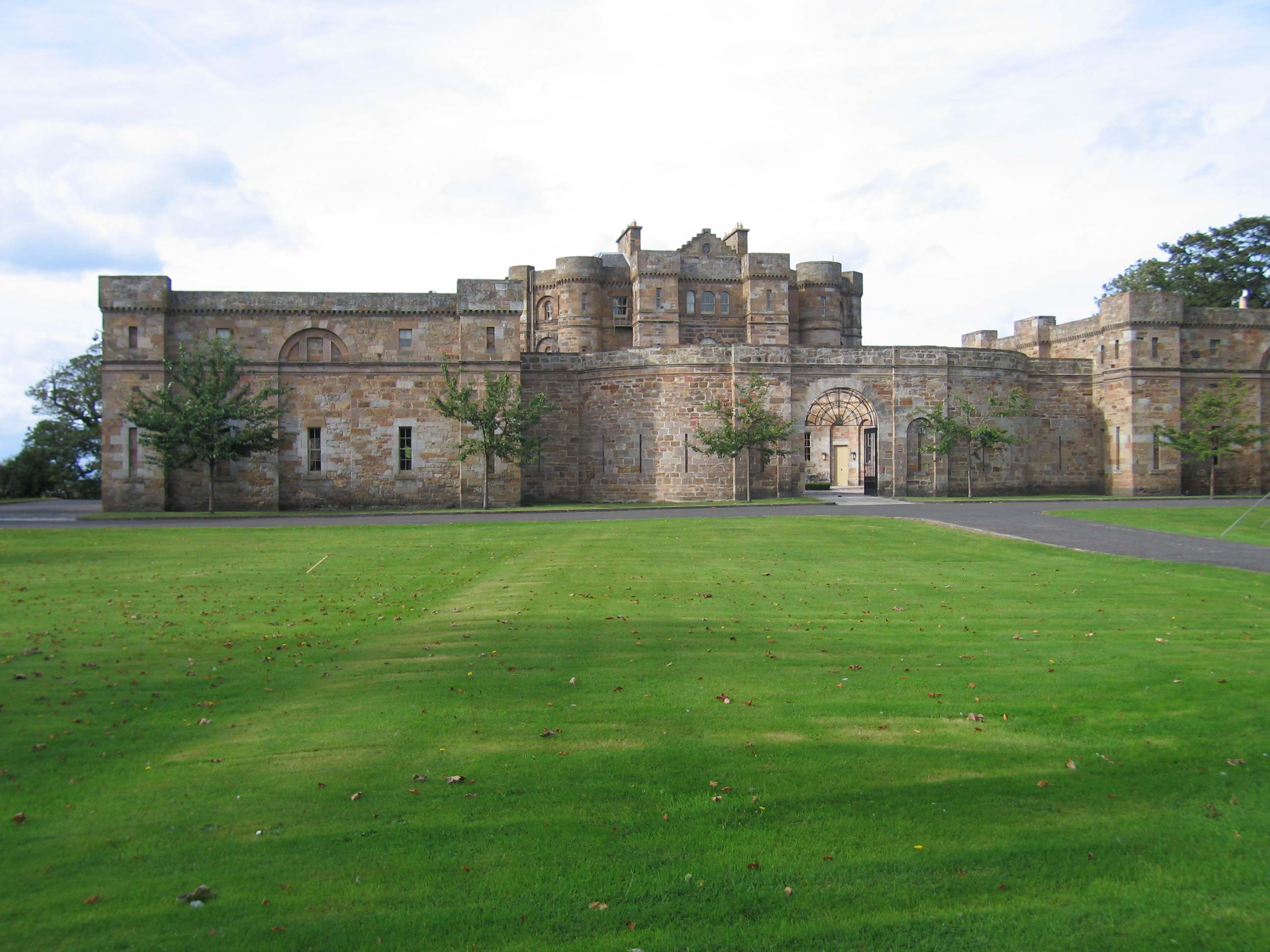
Seton Castle in 2007

Seton Castle or Seton Hall is an 18th-century Georgian castle-style house in East Lothian, Scotland. The house was Robert Adam's final project in Scotland.

== History ==
Seton Castle was built in the late 1700s on the site of Seton Palace, which was demolished in 1789. The palace, near Longniddry, on the Firth of Forth, formerly belonged to the Earls of Winton and was a popular retreat for Mary, Queen of Scots. She spent time at the palace after the murder of her second husband, Lord Darnley; they had also spent their honeymoon there. The date when the original palace was built is uncertain but it was located on the lands of Seton and Winton. The palace was burnt by the English army in May 1544 after the burning of Edinburgh.

Historical records indicate that it was the most magnificent palace in Scotland in the 17th century. Kings James VI and Charles I were entertained at the palace. It was damaged and burned out again during the 1715 Jacobite Rising and in 1780, it was described as being in ruins. The palace was demolished in 1789.

Lt Col Alexander Mackenzie of the 21st Dragoons, eldest son of Alexander MacKenzie of Portmore, Peeblesshire commissioned Robert Adam in the summer of 1789 to build a new mansion that would become Seton Castle. The remains of the old building were demolished and cleared by 1790, with the exception of the vaulted ground floor which remained. Stone from the old palace was used when building the new mansion.

By December 1789 working drawings were completed and the building contract was awarded to Thomas Russell. The construction occurred between 12 November 1789 and the summer of 1791. John Patterson, Robert Adam's Clerk of Works in Scotland, who later became a competent architect in his own right, reported to Adam in a letter of 26 April 1790 that the old building had been demolished and cleared.

The property is adjacent to Seton Collegiate Church which is now in the care of Historic Scotland.

The house was category A listed as Seton House and the surrounding grounds designated in 1987. It was described as a castellated late-Georgian house, one of the most striking of Robert Adam's late houses in the castle style. It was made up of several shaped towers around a curved wall enclosing the courtyard which is entered by a central archway. The report in 1987 states, "only the walls of the famous formal gardens of the 16th and 17th century remain [of the original palace]". The Listing document describes the building as follows. "The main block of the house is joined by thick screen walls to the wings, and an entrance court is enclosed by a further fortified screen wall linking the two wings. It has classical interior details, and is accorded high value."

== Owners ==
When Alexander Mackenzie died as a young man in 1796, the Earl of Wemyss acquired the estate and the family owned it for over two centuries. For a time, the castle was rented to the Stevenson family of Prestonfield House. It was sold in 2003 to Mary McMillan, a property developer, when it was "in a dreadful state". After a major restoration, she listed it for sale. Entrepreneur Stephen Leach bought the property in 2007 and completed additional renovations; after a major restoration, he sold it in 2019. At that time, the property, on 13.5 acres, was described as a 18,196 square feet (1,690.5 m^{2}) mansion with seven bedrooms. (When the stand-alone cottages are included, the number of bedrooms totaled 13.) The mansion was said to retain "many original features including 'Corinthian pillars' and a cantilevered stone staircase in the reception hall". In addition to the mansion, the property included working stables and a private tavern. The Castle was sold to David Fam, Founder of Dreamr Hotels in 2022. In 2024, the property was again listed for sale.
