= Cockenzie and Port Seton =

Town in East Lothian, Scotland

Coordinates: 55.969°N 2.962°W

Cockenzie and Port Seton: Scottish Gaelic: Cùil Choinnich; Scots: Cockennie
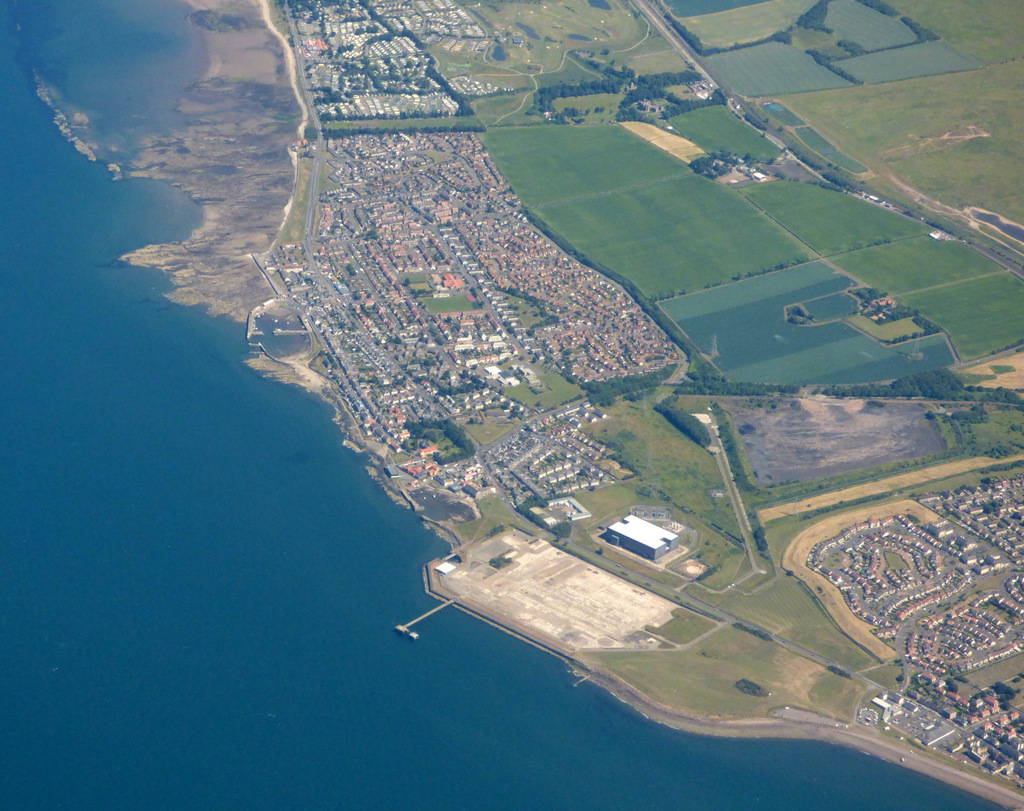
- Bird's-eye view of Cockenzie and Port Seton

- Location within East Lothian
- Population: 5,370 (2020)
- OS grid reference: NT399755
- Civil parish: Tranent
- Council area: East Lothian
- Lieutenancy area: East Lothian
- Country: Scotland
- Sovereign state: United Kingdom
- Post town: Prestonpans
- Postcode district: EH32
- Dialling code: 01875
- Police: Scotland
- Fire: Scottish
- Ambulance: Scottish
- UK Parliament: East Lothian
- Scottish Parliament: East Lothian

Cockenzie and Port Seton (Scots: Cockennie [ˈkukɪne]; Scottish Gaelic: Cùil Choinnich, lit. 'cove of Kenneth') is a unified town in East Lothian, Scotland. It is on the coast of the Firth of Forth, four miles east of Musselburgh. The burgh of Cockenzie was created in 1591 by James VI of Scotland. Port Seton harbour was built by the 11th Lord Seton between 1655 and 1665.

The town had a population of 4,493 in 2001. Since the last census in 2001, many new houses have been built. The population is 5,370 as of 2020. Cockenzie and Port Seton has continued to grow over the years and is now a dormitory town for Scotland's capital city, Edinburgh.

== Power station ==
To the west of the town, between Cockenzie and Prestonpans is the site of Cockenzie power station, a large coal-fired power station which was a major employer from the 1960s until it closed in 2013, and enabled the town to survive and prosper. Demolition of the main plant is now complete and ownership transferred to East Lothian Council who are now looking for businesses to occupy the site. Plans for an Energy Park on the site, to be used for the construction and repair of wind turbines, were scrapped in March 2015.

== Fishing ==
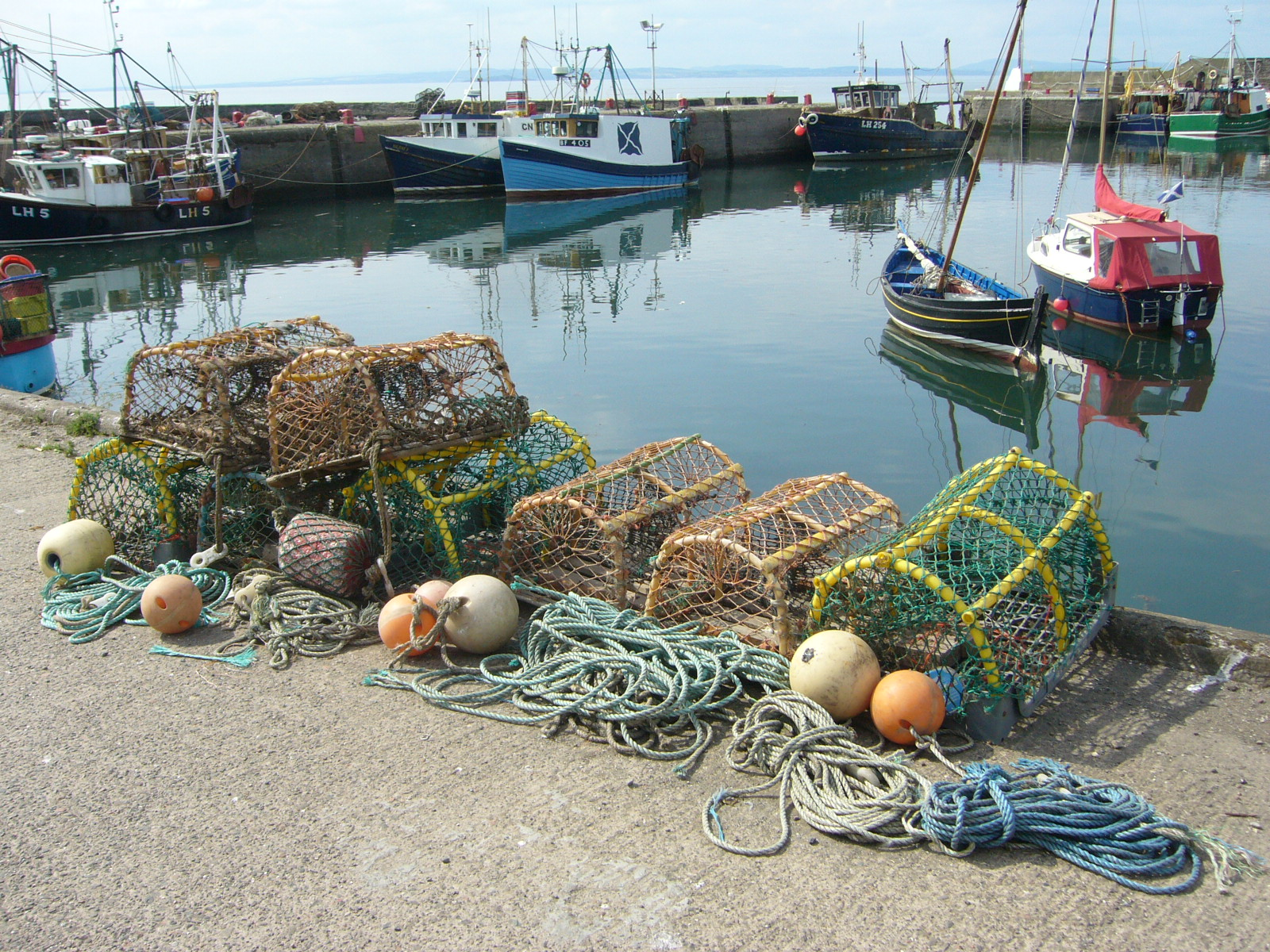
Port Seton Harbour

Cockenzie and Port Seton has grown from what were initially two small fishing villages. The older parts of the town, between the two harbours, retain a more traditional look and feel, similar to many other small fishing villages on the east coast of Scotland. Although the fishing industry has declined in recent years the harbour at Port Seton still retains a small fleet of vessels, mainly fishing for prawns. In the past, Cockenzie was also involved in the salt making and coal mining industries. In the years leading up to the First World War, fishing in Cockenzie and Port Seton continued to prosper. The Annual Report of the Fishery Board for 1913 states: "These villages have an industrious population of fishermen, who engage at the herring fishings at the principal Scottish and English centres. They wer very successful this year. The home fisheries were actively carried on in spring and winter, and were rather more productive than usual. Motors have been put into many of the large and small boats."

Fishery Statistics

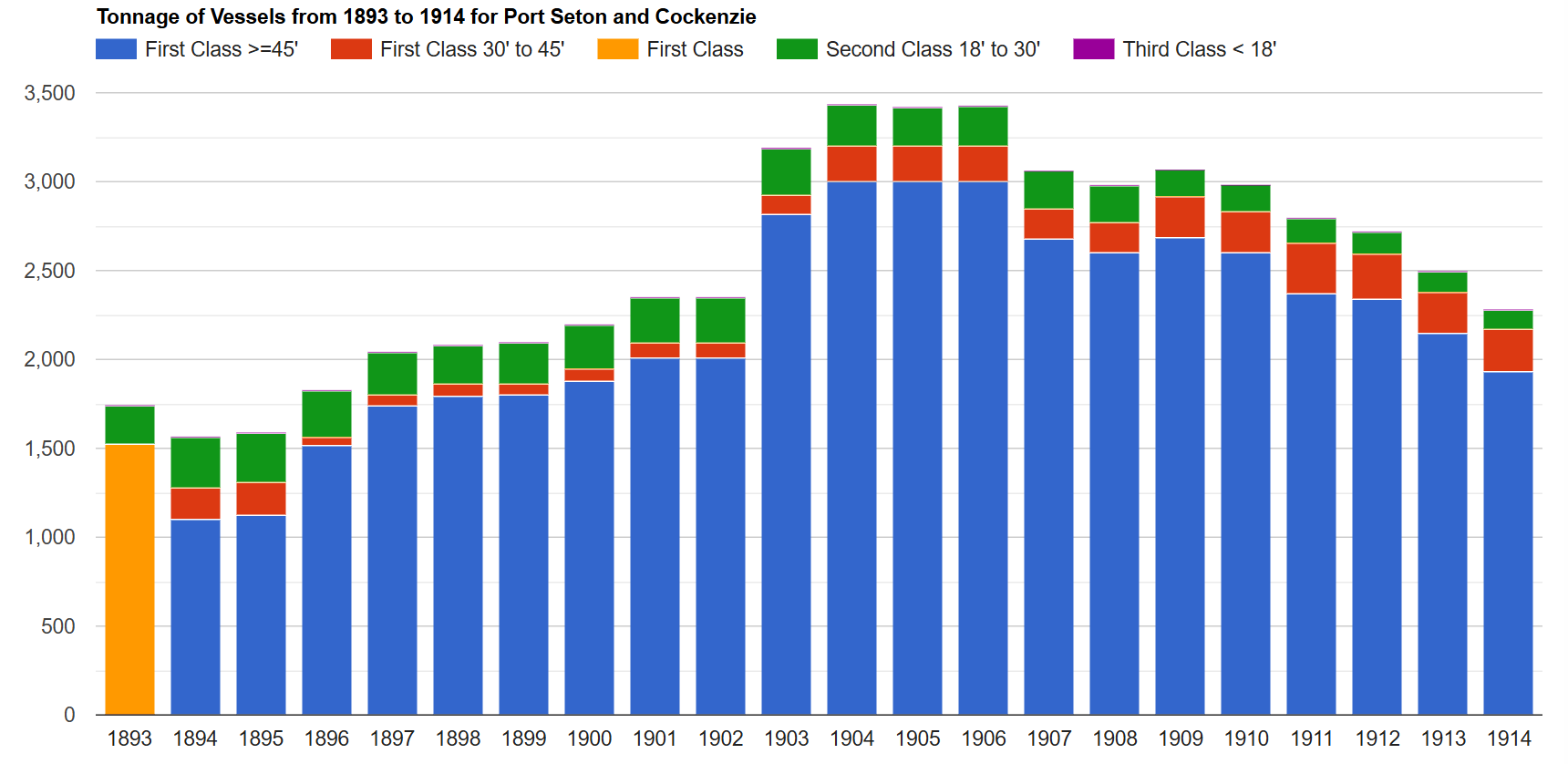
Tonnage of vessels

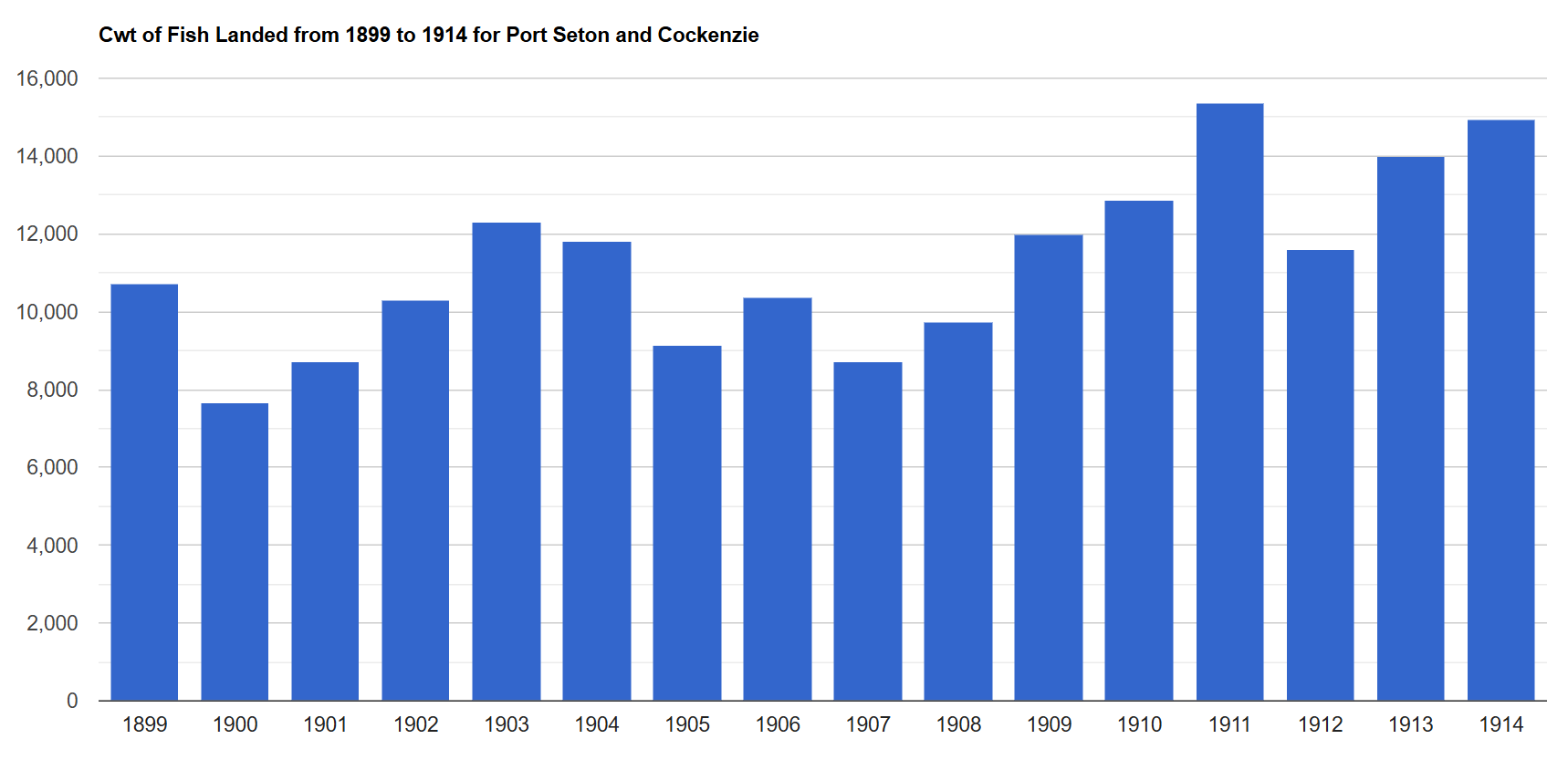
Cwt of fish landed

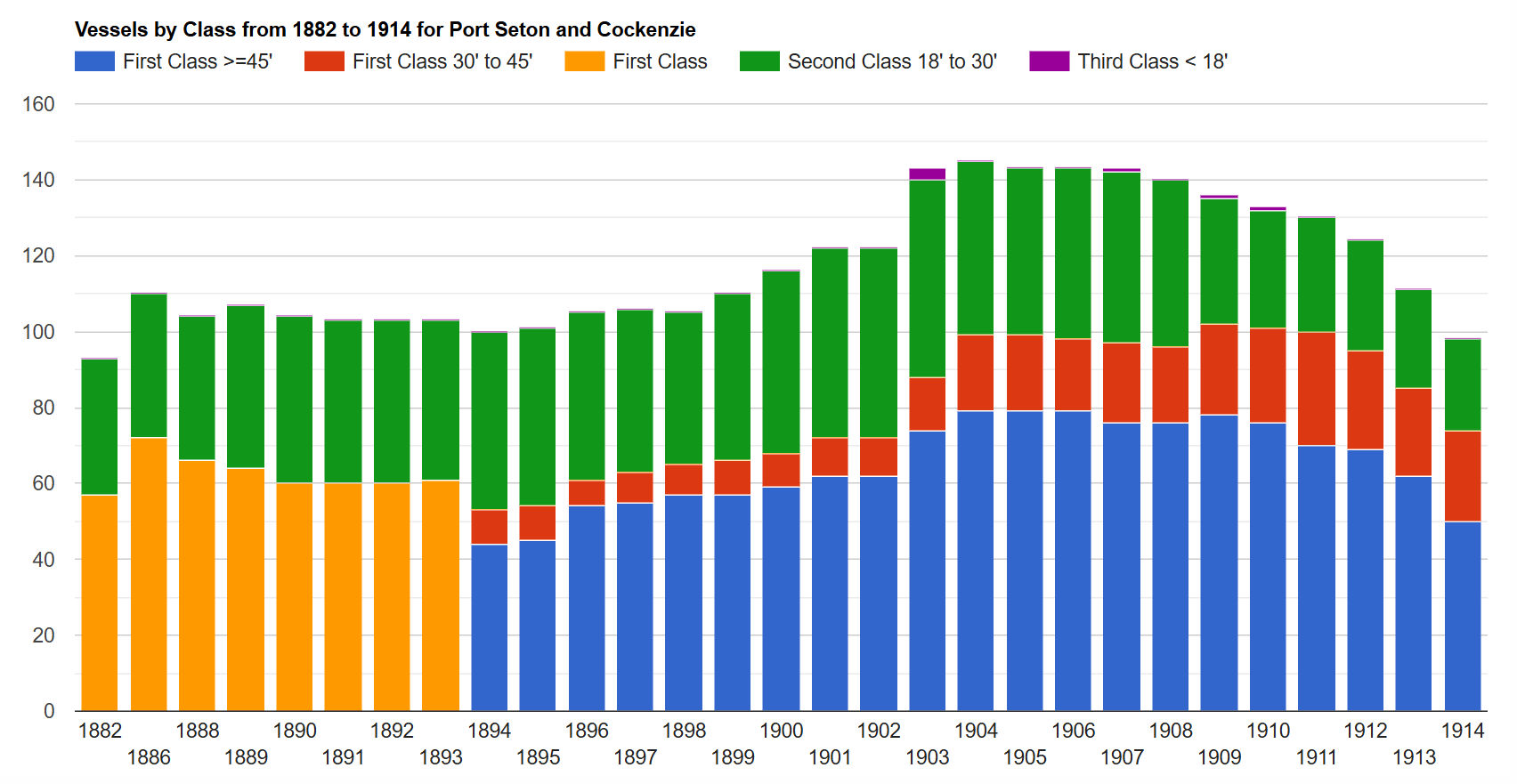
Vessels by class

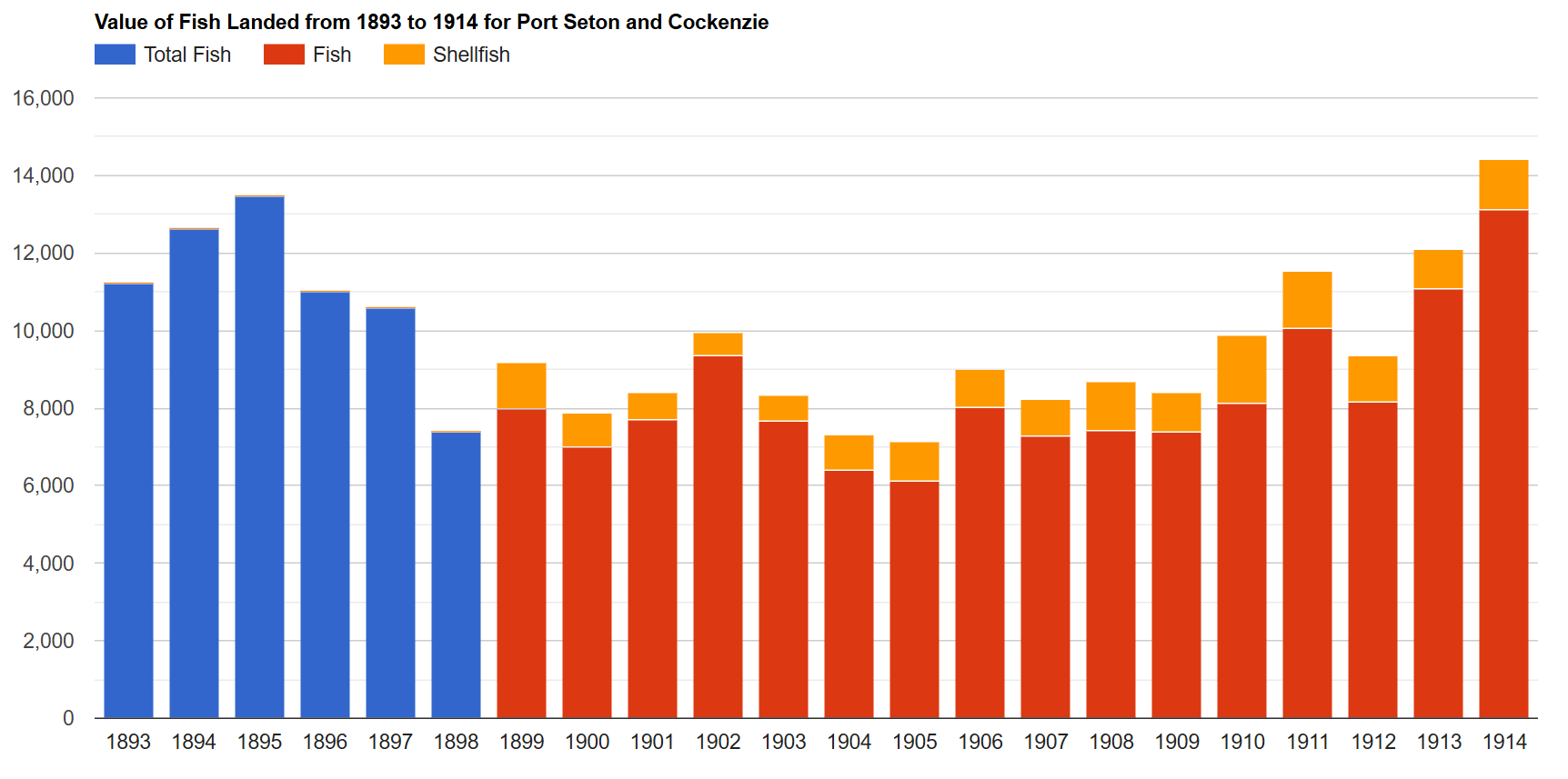
Value (£) of fish landed

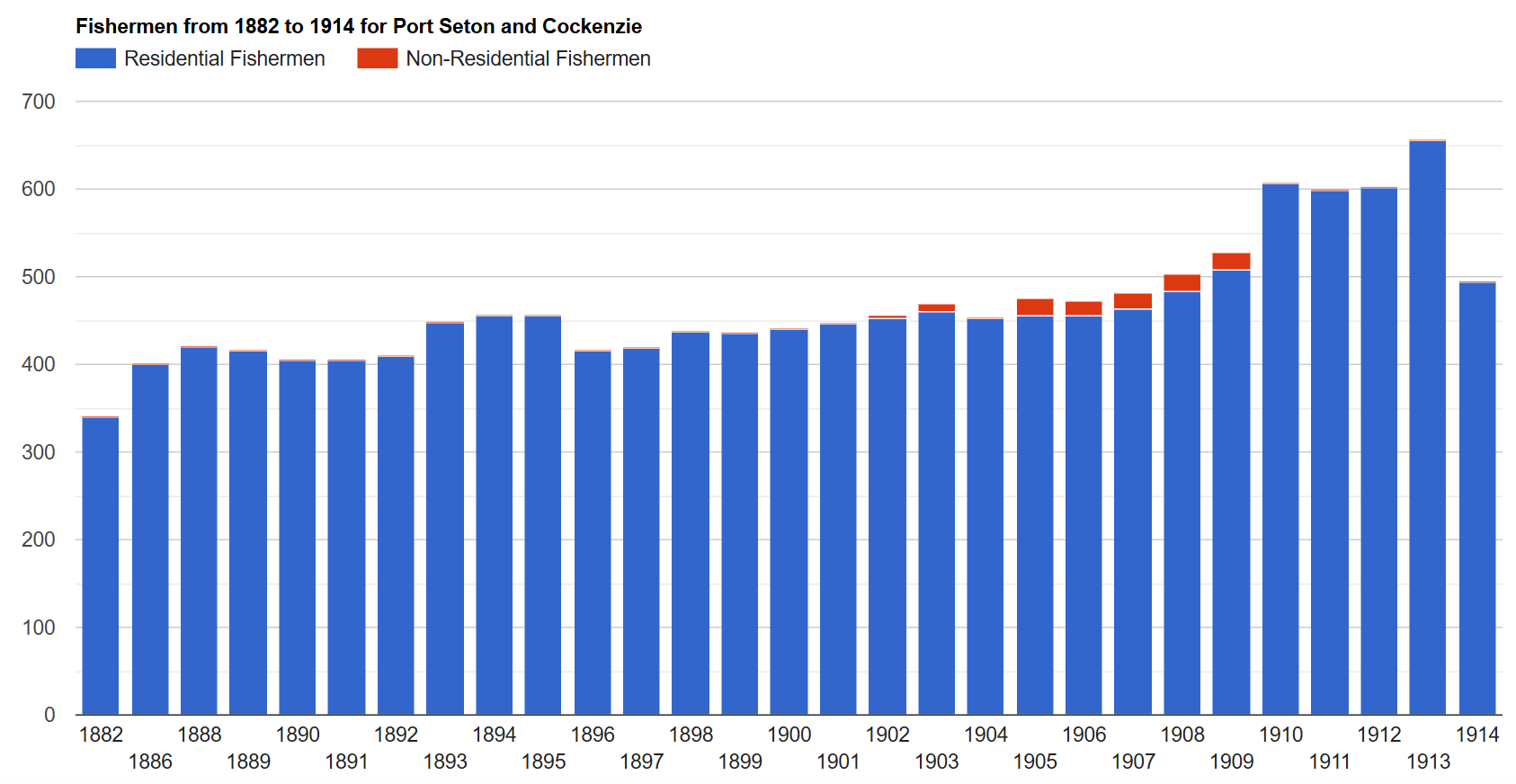
Fishermen

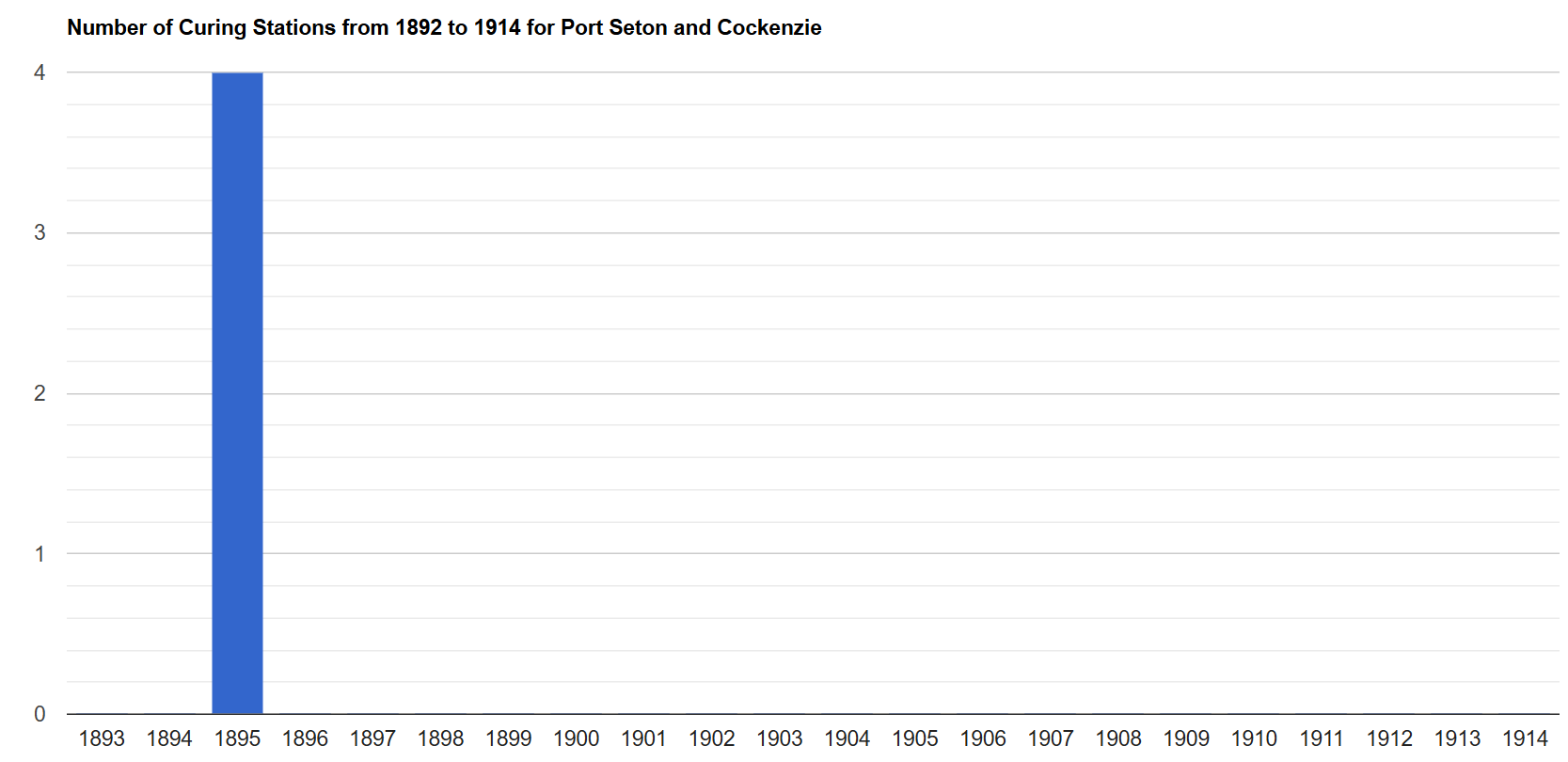
Number of curing stations

== Salt pans ==
The salt pans in Cockenzie were established by George Seton, 3rd Earl of Winton around 1630, possibly slightly later. When the salt pans were first established there were twelve. By 1790 there were ten, and by 1840 six pans remaining. It is not known at what point the pan house, the building that contained the salt pans, stopped being used for salt production, but it is known that it was rebuilt at some point in the Victorian period as tenement flats. The tenements were destroyed in the early 1940s, though outer walls remained intact. The salt pans would have been fueled by coal transported to Cockenzie via the Tranent to Cockenzie Waggonway.

Excavation of one of the salt pans, known as the Auld Kirk pan, was undertaken in 2019 by the Waggonway 1722 Project with the assistance of local volunteers. During the first season of excavation, the remains of the tenements were cleared, clearing the way for future excavation. No excavation took place during 2020 because of the COVID-19 pandemic. Excavation resumed in 2021 and revealed the remains of the ash pits, which were a later addition to the pan house built within the original walls. The pits were filled with ash deposits and made of clay brick. They are approximately one metre deep and reach the bedrock. An iron bar was found across one of the pits, which would have supported a grate or grill upon which the coal would have been burnt. The second bar that would have gone across the other ash pit is missing, though the slots in the brick that it would have rested in remain. Large, rectangular pans of brine would have sat above these grates to boil the brine and produce salt. As the coal burned, the ashes would have fallen through the grate and down into the ash pits, where it would later be raked out. This section of the pan house likely dates to between the end of the 18th century and the earlier part of the 19th century. This period of use is the latter of two phases of use and represents the most efficient phase. The use of grates allowed for a much more efficient use of coal than the earlier method, where coal would have simply been burned on the ground.

== Tourism ==
To the east of Port Seton there is a large caravan campsite/holiday park at Seton Sands. The promenade area and the creation of a coastal walk, a part of the John Muir Way, have improved the environment in recent years.

To the south east is Seton Collegiate Church, a collegiate church also known as Seton Chapel, an Ancient Monument in the care of Historic Scotland. Next to it was Seton Palace, now Seton Castle.

== Transport ==
Cockenzie and Port Seton are served by direct bus links to and from Edinburgh, Prestonpans and Musselburgh. These services are operated by Lothian Buses (routes 26, N26 and X26). The nearest railway station is at Prestonpans.

== Churches ==
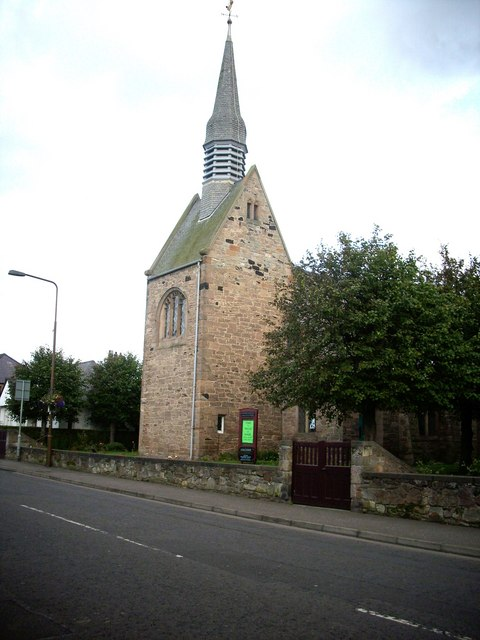
Chalmers Memorial Church

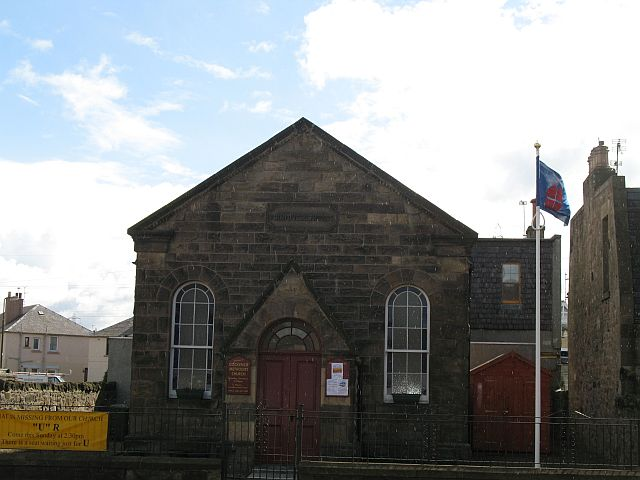
Cockenzie Methodist Church

Cockenzie and Port Seton have several churches of different denominations, including:

- Chalmers Memorial Church (Church of Scotland)
- Old Parish Church (Church of Scotland)
- Methodist Church
- Two Gospel halls

== Leisure ==
In 2005, The 3 Harbours Arts Festival was inaugurated by Cockenzie, Port Seton and Prestonpans. It takes place in early June.

In 2006, Cockenzie and Port Seton along with the neighbouring towns of Prestonpans and Longniddry were twinned with the town of Barga, Tuscany, Italy.

The town has a community centre with activities such as a youth club, football pitches and a skatepark within the grounds.

== Notable people ==
- Francis Cadell, mariner and explorer.
- John Dalgleish Donaldson, professor and the father of Queen Mary of Denmark, was born there in 1941
- John Bellany, artist, was born in Port Seton in 1942
- Robert Cadell, Sir Walter Scott's publisher, lived in Cockenzie
- Thomas Cadell, recipient of the Victoria Cross

== See also ==
- Preston Lodge High School
- Tranent to Cockenzie Waggonway
- List of listed buildings in Cockenzie And Port Seton, East Lothian
- List of places in East Lothian
- List of places in Scotland
