= Waughton Castle =

Coordinates: 56.0189°N 2.6962°W

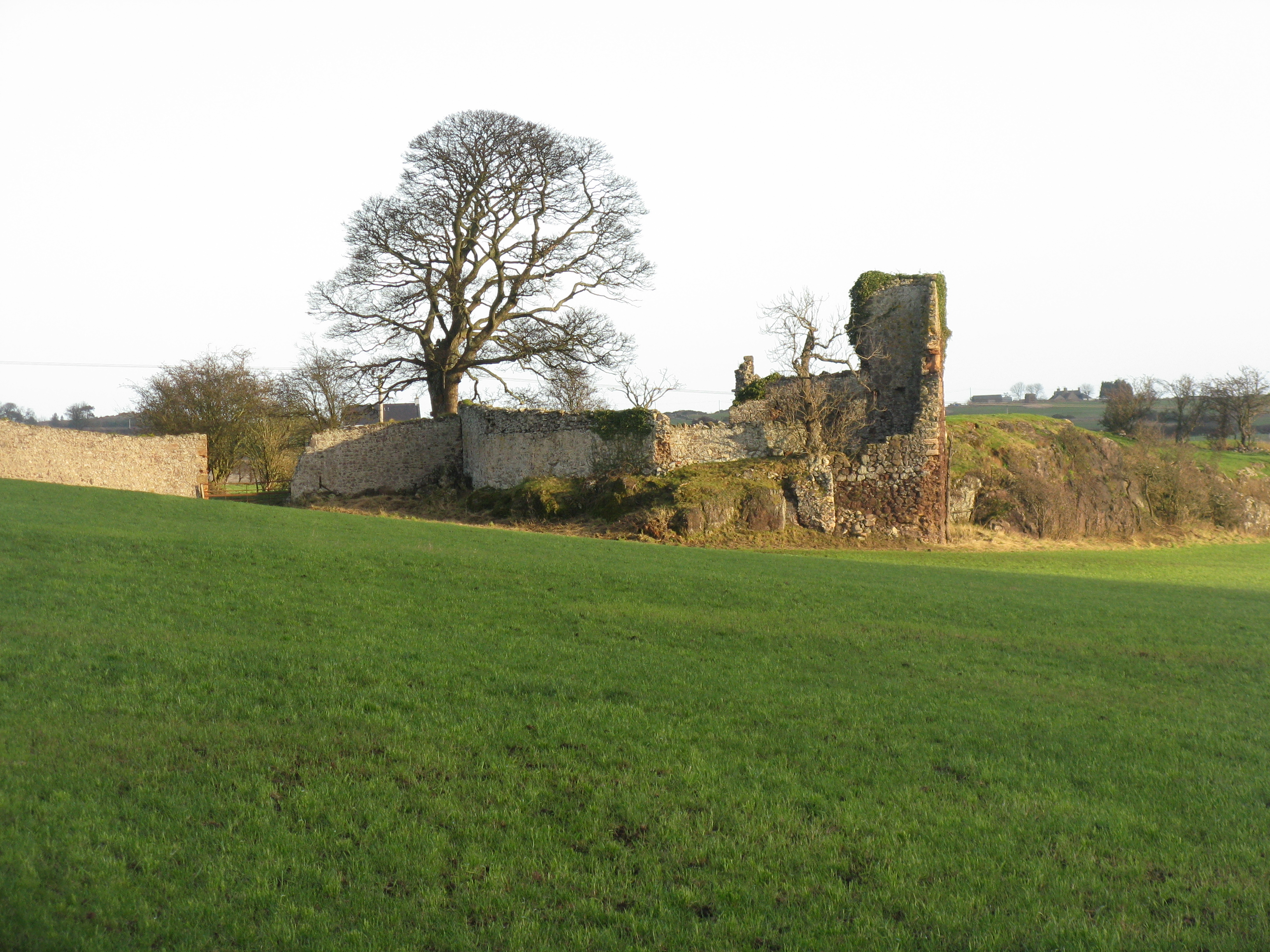
Ruins of Waughton Castle

Waughton Castle is a ruined castle, dating from the fourteenth century, about 3 miles (4.8 km) north of East Linton, and 2 miles (3.2 km) west of Whitekirk in East Lothian, Scotland. It is a scheduled monument.

== Structure ==
Waughton Castle was a castle with a courtyard, but only part of one wing remains. The ruins are on a rock terrace, which is about 15 feet higher than the surrounding ground to the west and south. The remains of a small tower, at the south-west angle, and which is built of rubble with freestone dressing, stand up to 25 feet in height. Features of a narrow window in the south wall suggest that this is a 16th-century structure. A wall has been built to east and north of the rock, with a structure at the angle, but they are believed to date from later. There is a partially artificial stairway up the rock. There is a doocot in the grounds.

== History ==
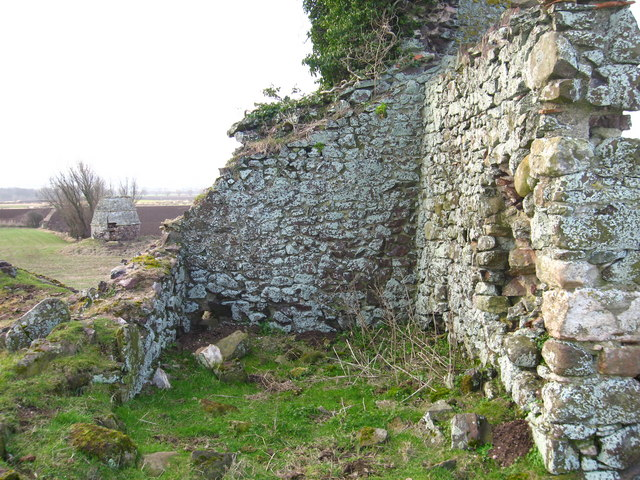
Interior of the ruins

There is a mention of a hall at "Walchtoun in a document from 1395. The castle was the property of the Hepburn family. When Patrick Hepburn of Waughton made his will in August 1547 he worried that the English would destroy his crops. Waughton was sacked by the English in September 1547.

His son, also Patrick Hepburn, was a supporter of Mary, Queen of Scots, and it was said she visited the castle from Seton Palace and took part in an archery match. He fought for Mary at the battle of Carberry Hill. In September 1567, Regent Moray ordered him to deliver up or surrender Waughton castle. The holders of neighbouring strongholds were also detained at this time.

In January 1570, when it was in the keeping of the Laird of Carmichael, the castle was raided by a dispossessed Hepburn. The Hepburns acquired the castle again by legal means, and retained it until Alexander Cockburn purchased the castle from John Hepburn. By the 18th century the castle was being used as material for building walls and cottages in the area.

James VI made a hunting trip to the area in February 1595, planning to visit Dunglass, Spott, Beil, Waughton, and Seton.
