= Brady Corporation =

American manufacturing company

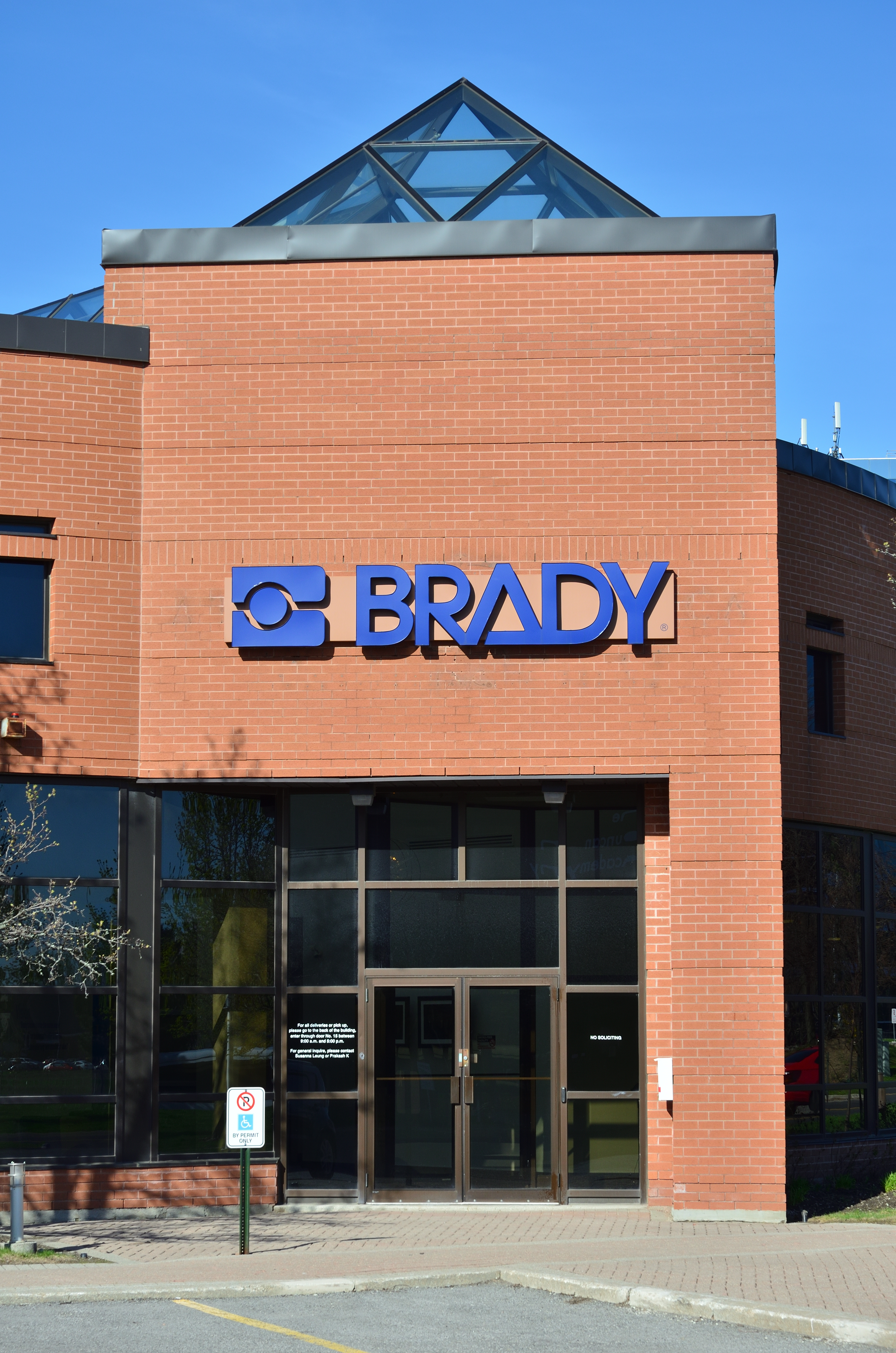
- Brady Office
- Type: Public
- Traded as: NYSE: BRC; S&P 600 component
- Industry: Manufacturing
- Founded: November 11, 1914; 111 years ago
- Headquarters: Milwaukee, Wisconsin, U.S.
- Area served: Worldwide
- Key people: Vineet Nargolwala (President and CEO)
- Products: Identification solutions
- Revenue: ▲US$1.32 billion (2012)
- Net income: ▲US$108.7 million (2012)
- Number of employees: 6,600
- Subsidiaries: Precision Dynamics Corporation; Accidental Health and Safety; Grafo; Emedco; Carroll; Seton Identification Products; Code Corporation
- Website: www.bradyid.com

Brady Corporation is an American developer and manufacturer of specialty products, technical equipment, and services for identifying components used in workplaces. Headquartered in Milwaukee, Wisconsin, Brady employs 6,600 people in North and South America, Europe, Asia, and Australia and serves customers and markets globally. Brady Corporation was founded as W.H. Brady Co. in Eau Claire, Wisconsin, in 1914, by William Henry Brady (1879–1953). In 1984, the company went public and began trading on the NASDAQ market. In 1998, W.H. Brady Co. became Brady Corporation and in 1999, the company began trading on the New York Stock Exchange under the ticker symbol BRC. Brady has more than 1 million customers with fiscal net sales for 2013/14 of US$1.225 billion.

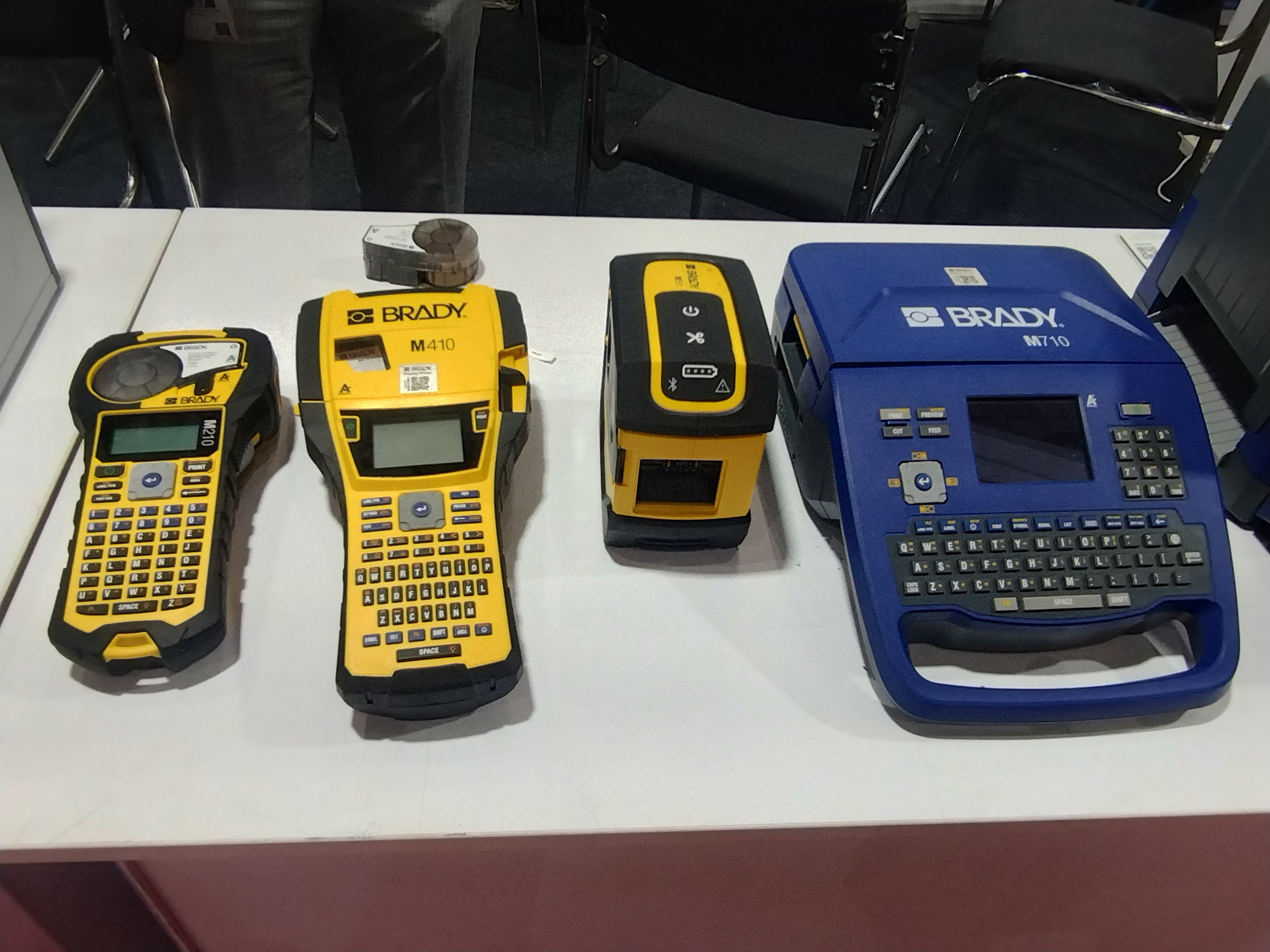
Brady printers and label makers at Electronica 2025, BIEC

== Products ==
The company's main product lines are in safety identification, regulatory compliance, brand protection, laboratory identification and specimen tracking, visitor access, voice and data communications and precision die-cut components. They include do-it-yourself printing systems, labeling materials, signs and software, and lockout/tagout, spill control and regulatory compliance devices. Brady sells through distribution channels and e-commerce websites.

Brady markers identified every pipe in the Manhattan Project's weapons plant in the 1940s. Brady Contract Services was used on North Slope during construction of the Alaska gas pipeline. Brady SPC sorbent products helped clean up the Deepwater Horizon oil spill.

Brady has supplied helmet logos for a number of NFL teams including the Green Bay Packers.

== History ==
Brady's first products were promotional calendars, painted signs and point-of-purchase displays. The company survived the Great Depression by producing push cards: small paperboard cards with rows of perforated circles concealing numbers. During World War II, Brady developed the wire marker card – numbered cloth strips on an adhesive card.

In the 1950s and 1960s, Brady moved to Milwaukee. The company developed proprietary machines that could laminate, die cut, print and cut to length in a single operation.

Having sold their products through distribution and mail order since 1947, the company in the 1970s established subsidiaries in England, Belgium, Germany, France and Australia. By 1980, international subsidiaries accounted for 20 percent of sales.

In 1981, Brady acquired Seton Identification Products, a direct marketing business that sold nearly identical products. Seton's catalog mailings rose from 1 million in 1981 to 8 million in 1988 and 1985. Subsidiaries were established in England, Canada and Germany by 1988.

In the 1990s, the company introduced printing systems that enabled customers to print their own safety signs, labels and identification products on-site.

In the 2000s, more than 35 acquisitions led to a tripling in size between 2003 and 2010.

In 2010, Brady became a Smartway Transport partner in the U.S., while in 2009 it opened a facility in Egelsbach, Germany, that uses a geothermic heating and cooling system. It says it uses Design for Environment principles to design eco-friendly products, including halogen-free flame-retardant labels and ribbons.

In 2012, Brady issued its first annual sustainability report. The company says its operations focus on reducing waste, conserving energy, using natural resources responsibly and promoting employee safety.

In its communities, it operates through philanthropy and employee engagement. Charitable giving through the Brady Corporation Foundation and Brady Corporation has surpassed US$1 million. Recent projects include a third China Hope School in Sichuan Province; "Brady Corporation, Jr.," an interactive exhibit that teaches preschoolers about manufacturing at the Betty Brinn Children's Museum in Milwaukee; and funding college educations through I Have a Dream for a class of students at Clarke Street Elementary School.

Effective August 3, 2026 Brady Corporation acquired Honeywell's Productivity Solutions and Services business for $1.4 billion.

== International expansion ==
1947: Brady began selling its products internationally, to South Africa.

1950s: First European sales office in U.K., and operations in Canada.

1960s and 1970s: Expansion throughout Europe with operations in Belgium, Germany, France and Sweden.

1980s: Entered Asia, Australia, Hong Kong, Japan and Singapore.

1990s: Began operating in Mexico, Italy, and Brazil with further expansion in Asia to China, Malaysia, Philippines, South Korea, and Taiwan.

2000s (decade): Continued expansion in Asia, Thailand and India as well as expansion into Slovakia in Eastern Europe; Turkey in the Middle East and the United Arab Emirates.

== Brady brands ==
As a result of acquisitions, Brady products are traded under a variety of names and brands, including Code Corporation, Nordic ID, Magicard, IDenticard, Seton, Electromark, PDC, Emedco, Scafftag, Clement Communications, ID Warehouse, Securimed, Signals, Precision Dynamics Corporation, Accidental Health & Safety, Safety Signs & Service, Trafalgar Australia, Carroll, SPC, and Transposafe.
