= Precision Dynamics Corporation =

Identification device manufacturer

PDC, A Brady Business
- Type: Corporation
- Industry: Healthcare Event management Law enforcement
- Founded: 1956
- Headquarters: 25124 Springfield Court, Suite 200; Santa Clarita, CA 91355; United States
- Key people: J. Michael Nauman (CEO) Robert Case (President)
- Brands: PDC Healthcare; IDenticard; Wristbands.com; Promovision; Brady People ID; PDC Inmate ID; PDC EMEA; PDC Healthcare EMEA
- Services: Wristband manufacturing, Patient Safety, Crowd Control, RFID Crowd/ Entertainment Management
- Parent: Brady Corporation
- Website: www.pdcorp.com

Precision Dynamics Corporation (PDC) is an American international identification device manufacturer headquartered in Santa Clarita, California with offices abroad in Belgium, France, and the United Kingdom. The company makes identification devices for healthcare, jailing, and entertainment purposes, including wristband and RFID devices.

== History ==
Precision Dynamics Corporation was co-founded in 1956 by Dr. Walter W. Mosher, a student in engineering at the University of California, Los Angeles who developed the first single-piece wristband for hospitals which did not require any parts or tools.

PDC first developed into the prisoner management/law-enforcement and entertainment markets in the 1970s, with inmate ID and patron management wristbands, respectively.

In November 2008, Precision Dynamics Corporation acquired TimeMed Labeling Systems, Inc., an American producer of specialty healthcare labels

PDC has maintained ISO 9001:2008 certification for many of their products as following safety and other standards for medical devices.

In June 2010, Precision Dynamics released Securline Bar Code Blood Band, an identification wristband system that automatically identifies a patient for blood transfusion, specimen collection, and tracking.

Today, PDC is one of the leading wristband manufacturers with facilities and offices in Mexico, the USA, and in the EU.

== PDC brands ==
Event business: VIP(R)Band

Healthcare: PDC, TimeMed
