= Elizabeth Seton Academy =

Elizabeth Seton Academy may refer to:

- Elizabeth Seton Academy (Boston) in Boston, Massachusetts
- Mother Seton Academy in Baltimore, Maryland
- St. Elizabeth Ann Seton Academy in Central Falls, Rhode Island
- St. Elizabeth Ann Seton Academy in Milwaukee, Wisconsin
- Academy of St. Elizabeth in Convent Station, New Jersey
