= Seton High School =

Seton High School may refer to:

- Elizabeth Seton High School, Bladensburg, Maryland
- Seton Catholic Central High School, Binghamton, New York
- Seton Catholic High School, Chandler, Arizona
- Seton Catholic High School (Richmond, Indiana)
- Seton Catholic High School (Pittston, Pennsylvania)
- Seton High School (Cincinnati, Ohio)
- Seton High School (Manassas, Virginia)
- Seton-La Salle Catholic High School, Pittsburgh
- Seton Hall Preparatory School, West Orange, New Jersey
- St. Elizabeth Ann Seton Catholic School, Summerlin, Nevada
- St. Elizabeth Ann Seton Catholic High School, Vancouver, Washington
- Redeemer-Seton High School, New Orleans, Louisiana
- Seton Keough High School, Baltimore, Maryland, formerly called Seton High School

== See also ==
- Elizabeth Seton Academy (disambiguation)
