= Philippa Seaton =

Professor of nursing in New Zealand

Academic background
- Education: Massey University, Griffith University
- Theses: The experiences of registered nurses in polytechnic baccalaureat degree programmes : an interpretive phenomenological study (1998); Teaching and Learning in Internet Environments in Australian Nursing Education (2003)
- Doctoral advisor: Winsome St John, Anne McMurray
- Other advisors: Julie Boddy, Nancy L. Diekelmann

Philippa Seaton is a New Zealand academic, and is a full professor at the University of Otago, specialising in nursing education.

== Academic career ==
Seaton completed a Master's degree titled The experiences of registered nurses in polytechnic baccalaureat degree programmes: an interpretive phenomenological study at Massey University in 1998. She completed a PhD at Griffith University on Australian nursing education. Seaton then joined the faculty of the University of Otago, rising to associate professor in 2018 and full professor in 2022. She is the director of the Centre for Postgraduate Nursing Studies at Otago, and is based in Christchurch.

Seaton's research focuses on nursing education, and the nursing workforce. She is interested in how technology such as telehealth can be used to improve service delivery, but also how technology can be used to improve health worker education. Seaton has researched post-disaster recovery in education, based on recovery of nursing students and educators after the Christchurch earthquakes, but with outcomes applicable to other disasters such as pandemics. As a founding member of the Canterbury Nursing Research Alliance, Seaton coordinates research with the Canterbury District Health Board, Ara Institute and Canterbury University. She also has research collaborations with the School of Nursing at University of Melbourne, and with clinical partners such as Nurse Maude. Seaton was a member of the executive committee of the Council of Deans of Nursing and Midwifery in Australia.

== Selected works ==
- Lisa Whitehead; Seaton, Philippa (2016). "The Effectiveness of Self-Management Mobile Phone and Tablet Apps in Long-term Condition Management: A Systematic Review". Journal of Medical Internet Research. 18 (5): e97. doi:10.2196/jmir.4883. PMC 4886099. PMID 27185295. Wikidata Q28071907.
- Jessica Schluter; Seaton, Philippa; Wendy Chaboyer (2008). "Critical incident technique: a user's guide for nurse researchers". Journal of Advanced Nursing. 61 (1): 107–114. doi:10.1111/j.1365-2648.2007.04490.x. PMID 18173737. Wikidata Q62521887.
- Wendy Chaboyer; Wallis, Marianne; Duffield, Christine; Mary Courtney; Seaton, Philippa; Holzhauser, Kerri; Jessica Schluter; Nerolie Bost (2008). "A comparison of activities undertaken by enrolled and registered nurses on medical wards in Australia: an observational study". International Journal of Nursing Studies. 45 (9): 1274–1284. doi:10.1016/j.ijnurstu.2007.10.007. PMID 18243206. Wikidata Q53126200.
- Simon Cooper; Cant, Robyn; Michelle Kelly; Tracy Levett-Jones; McKenna, Lisa; Seaton, Philippa; Bogossian, Fiona (2019). "An Evidence-Based Checklist for Improving Scoping Review Quality". Clinical Nursing Research 1054773819846024. doi:10.1177/1054773819846024. PMID 31088144. Wikidata Q92014682.
- Jessica Schluter; Seaton, Philippa; Wendy Chaboyer (2011). "Understanding nursing scope of practice: a qualitative study". International Journal of Nursing Studies. 48 (10): 1211–1222. doi:10.1016/j.ijnurstu.2011.03.004. PMID 21470610. Wikidata Q46313930.
- Seaton, Philippa; Cant, Robyn; Henrietta Theodora Trip (2020). "Quality indicators for a community-based wound care centre: An integrative review". International Wound Journal. doi:10.1111/iwj.13308. PMID 32030879. Wikidata Q89588339.
- Seaton, Philippa; Tracy Levett-Jones; Cant, Robyn; Simon Cooper; Michelle A. Kelly; McKenna, Lisa; Linda Ng; Bogossian, Fiona (2019). "Exploring the extent to which simulation-based education addresses contemporary patient safety priorities: A scoping review". Collegian. 26 (1): 194–203. doi:10.1016/j.colegn.2018.04.006. Wikidata Q124790995.
