= Elizabeth Seton Academy (Boston) =

Location
- 2220 Dorchester Avenue; Boston (Dorchester), (Suffolk County), Massachusetts 02124; United States
- 42°16′29.6″N 71°4′1.0″W

Information
- Type: Private, All-Girls
- Motto: Hazard Yet Forward (Against the odds, go forward)
- Religious affiliation: Roman Catholic
- Established: 2003
- Status: closed
- Head of school: Mrs. Patricia S. Leitsinger
- Faculty: 15
- Grades: 9–12
- Average class size: 14
- Campus type: urban
- Colors: Maroon and Grey
- Athletics: Girls Independent Intramural League
- Nickname: ESA
- Team name: Bobcats
- Accreditation: New England Association of Schools and Colleges
- Tuition: 7,909
- Director of Advancement: Patricia F. Bulman
- Director of Admissions: Elizabeth K. Duddy
- Director of Guidance: Jennifer St.Jean
- Website: esaboston.com

Elizabeth Seton Academy (ESA) was an independent Roman Catholic high school for girls located in the Dorchester neighborhood of Boston, Massachusetts. The school was named for Saint Elizabeth Ann Seton.

The school was established in 2003 by a volunteer committee of 24 alumnae and former staff of Monsignor Ryan Memorial High School, a diocesan all-girls' Catholic school which operated in Dorchester from 1918 to 2003. The Archdiocese of Boston granted permission for the school to open on July 18, 2003 on the former campus of St. Gregory High School, which had closed in 1992.

In August 2016, ESA's board of trustees voted to close the school before the start of the 2016–17 academic year, calling the school's "current financial situation, increased debt obligations, declining enrollment, and increased costs of operations" an "insurmountable" challenge.
