= Seton Identification Products =

Product supplier

Seton Identification Products is a supplier of safety, labeling and signage products based in Buffalo, NY. Seton manufactures and distributes workplace safety equipment, facility marking applications, and traffic & parking signage, as well as warehouse and facility security products. It sells 57,000 products and has subsidiaries in 14 countries. It is a subsidiary of Brady Corporation of Milwaukee, Wisconsin.

== History ==
Seton was founded in 1956 as the Seton Name Plate Corporation in New Haven by Fenmore R. Seton. While still in the Air Force, in free time, Seton and his wife Phyllis started a part-time mail order business from their home, specializing in personalized Christmas cards for individuals with the surname 'Smith'. To meet the demand for their product, the Setons purchased a small table-top hot-stamping machine. In 1952, they purchased an attachment for their stamping machine to make doorbell nameplates. They went on to produce display boards for local hardware stores. In 1954, the service manager of a large Carrier Air Conditioning contractor in New Haven noticed one of the Setons' display boards and requested that they produce some specialized nameplates for his company.

By 1962, the company was handling a six-figure government order. The nameplate business grew rapidly, and Seton added another line, mail-order sales of industrial products. These products included pipe markers, safety signs, property identification tags, emblems, and truck signs. Seton became a specialist in a field known today as "business-to-business direct marketing".

In 1967, after years of reliance on flyers as their main source of marketing and advertising, the company published its first catalog, mailed to over 110,000 prospects. By the 1970s, annual sales were around $5 million, with 20–25% margins. By 1974, the company's mailing list had grown to over one million, and the catalog boasted that Seton offered "America's most complete line of signs, decals, plaques, trophies, tags and labels."

W.H. Brady bought Seton in 1981 when Fenmore Seton retired, and in 1983 the company moved to a new 85,000 sq ft (7,900 m^{2}) plant in Branford. By 1988, Seton's catalog mailings rose to 8 million, and sales in 2002 were $160 million. Fenmore Seton died in 2003, aged 85. Phyllis Seton died on August 8, 2019, at the age of 98.

In 2013, Brady announced the closure of the Branford plant.
