= Seton Collegiate Church =

Collegiate church in Scotland

Coordinates: 55.9654°N 2.9336°W

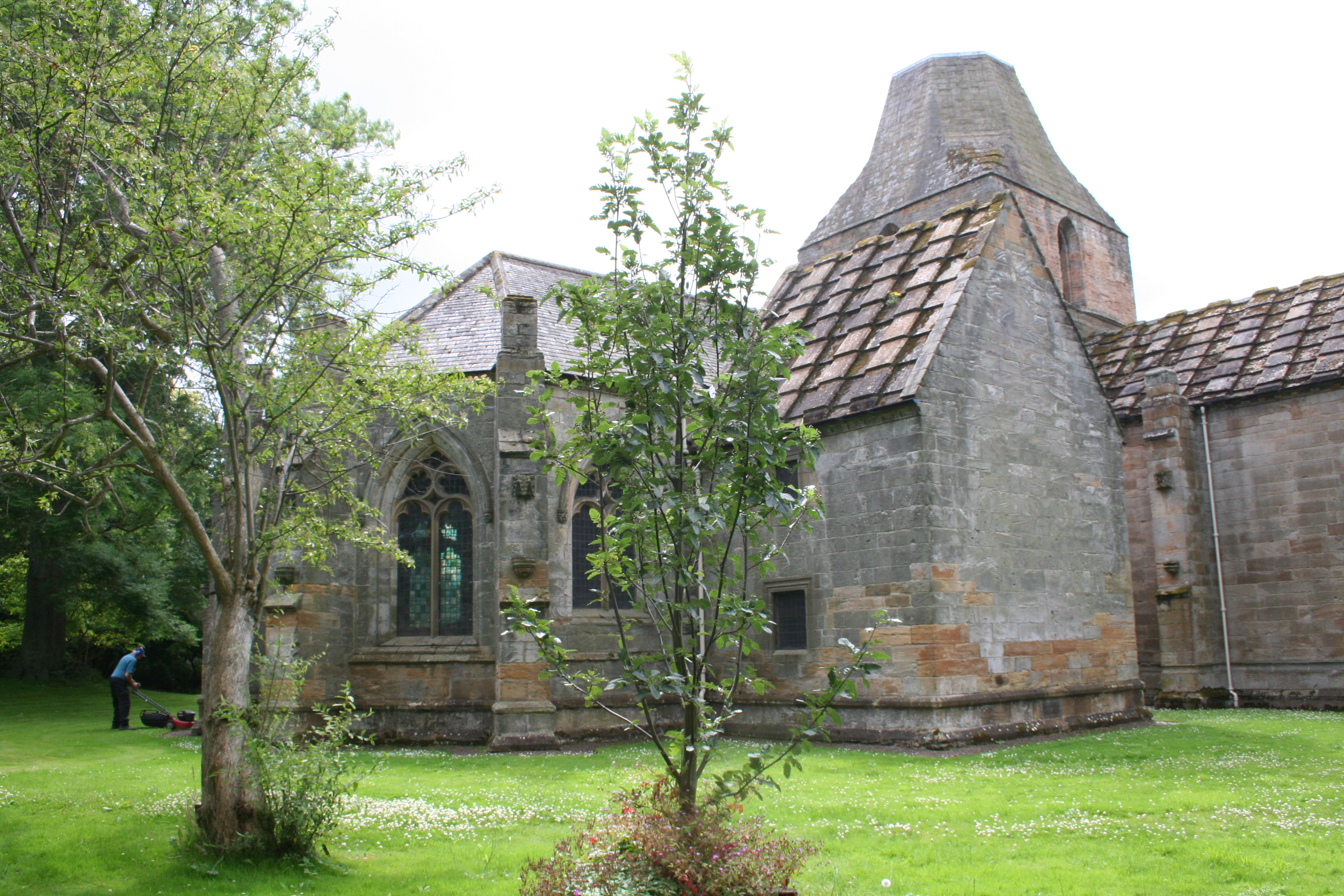
Seton Collegiate Church, near Tranent 01.jpg

Seton Collegiate Church, known locally as Seton Chapel, is a collegiate church south of Port Seton, East Lothian, Scotland. It is adjacent to Seton House. The church is designated as a scheduled monument.

== Description ==
The church consists of the complete eastern limb and the two transepts of a cruciform church, the crossing-tower as high as it was built (the completion of the spire was precluded by the Reformation), and the dubious foundations of the nave, which was not built. The walls of the choir and chancel were built by 1478, and roofed by 1508. The transepts were erected sometime between 1513 and 1588. As such the eastern limb stood without them for at least 35 years. The church was raised to collegiate status in 1492. Contained within are two effigies: one male and one female, dating from the fifteenth century. The female effigy, badly defaced, is possibly of earlier origin.

To the immediate south west are the foundations of the buildings once occupied by the clergy and staff.

During the war now known as the Rough Wooing, the English army occupied Haddington. The Seton family was forced to live at Culross Abbey in 1549, where George Seton, 6th Lord Seton died. After the war was over, his widow Marie Pieris had his body brought to Seton and buried in the choir next to his father.

The church is now in the care of Historic Environment Scotland, and a 4-Star Historic Tourist Attraction. Architectural fragments of the adjacent long-demolished Seton Palace are displayed in the churchyard.

== Photo gallery ==
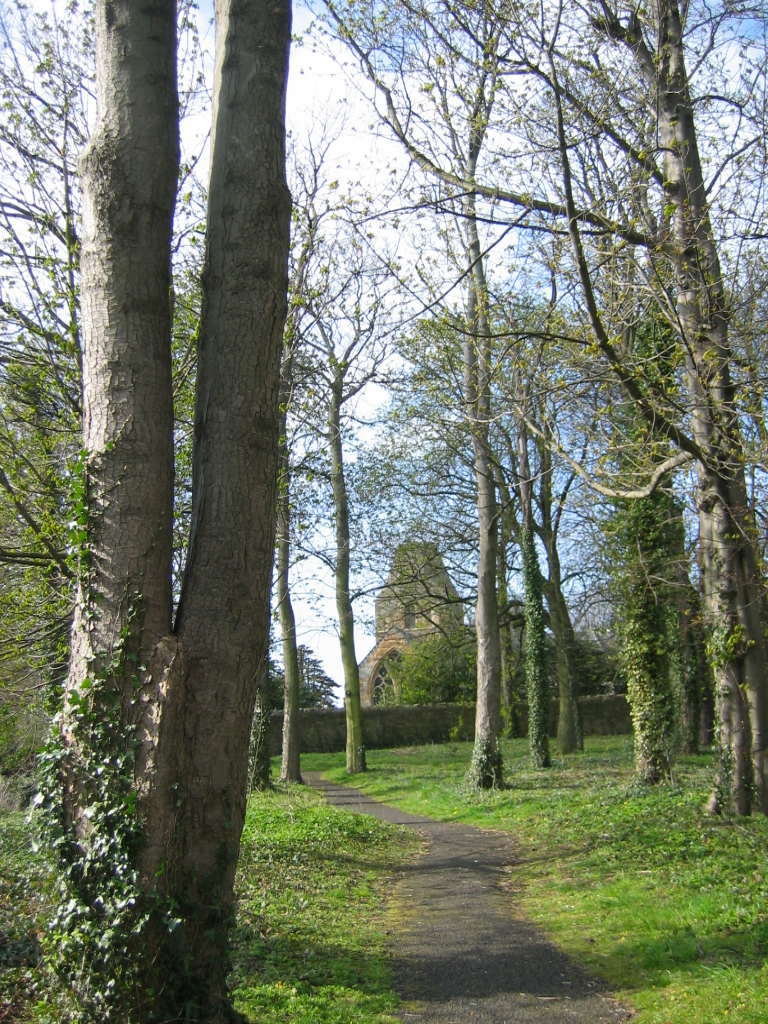

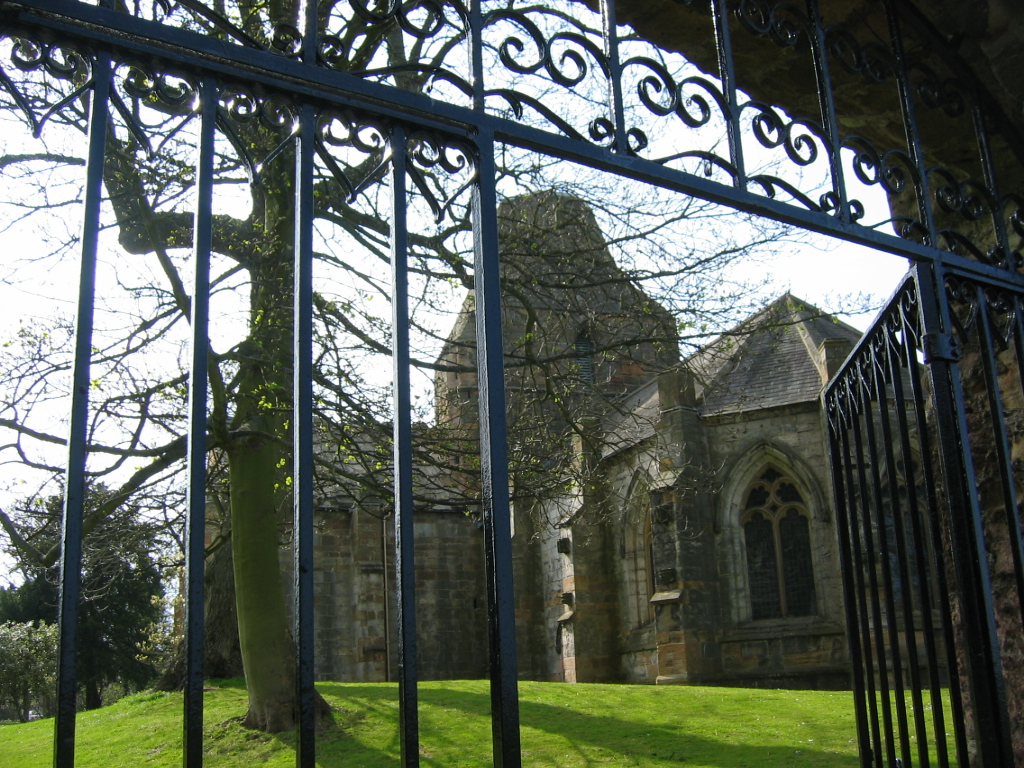

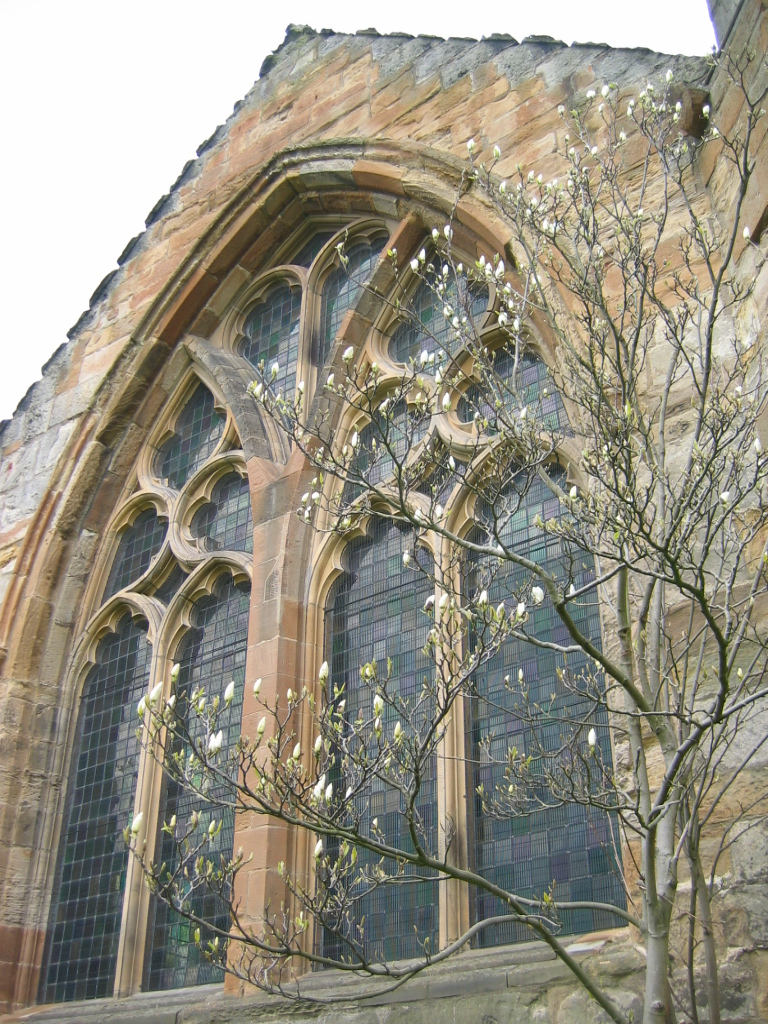

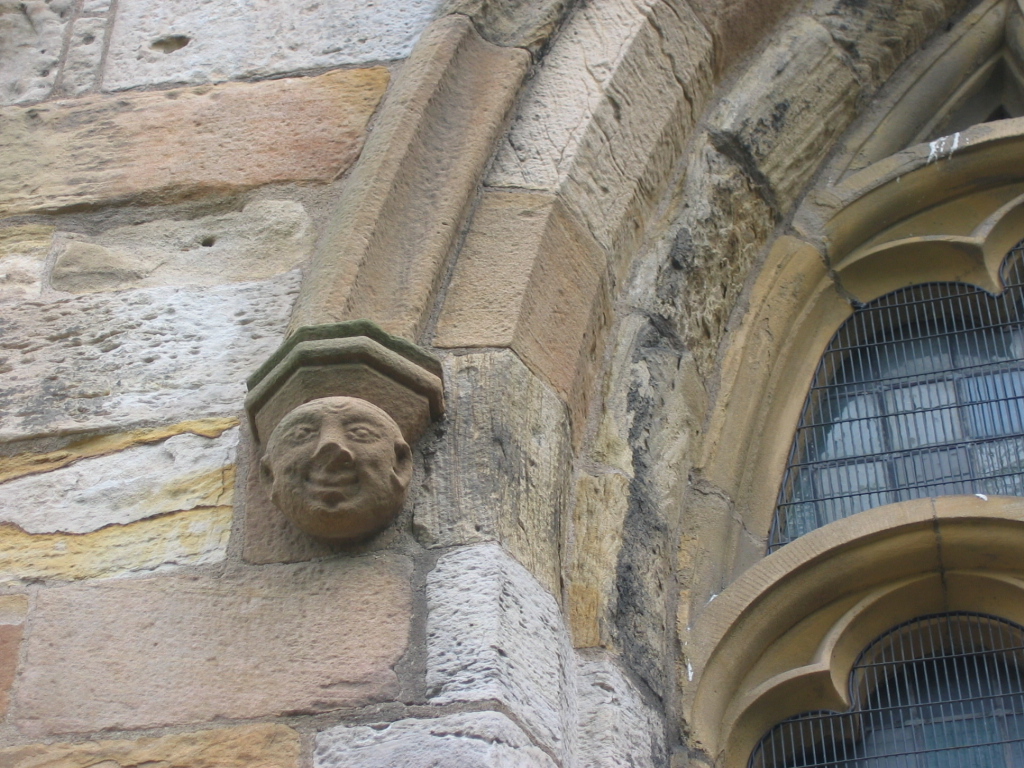

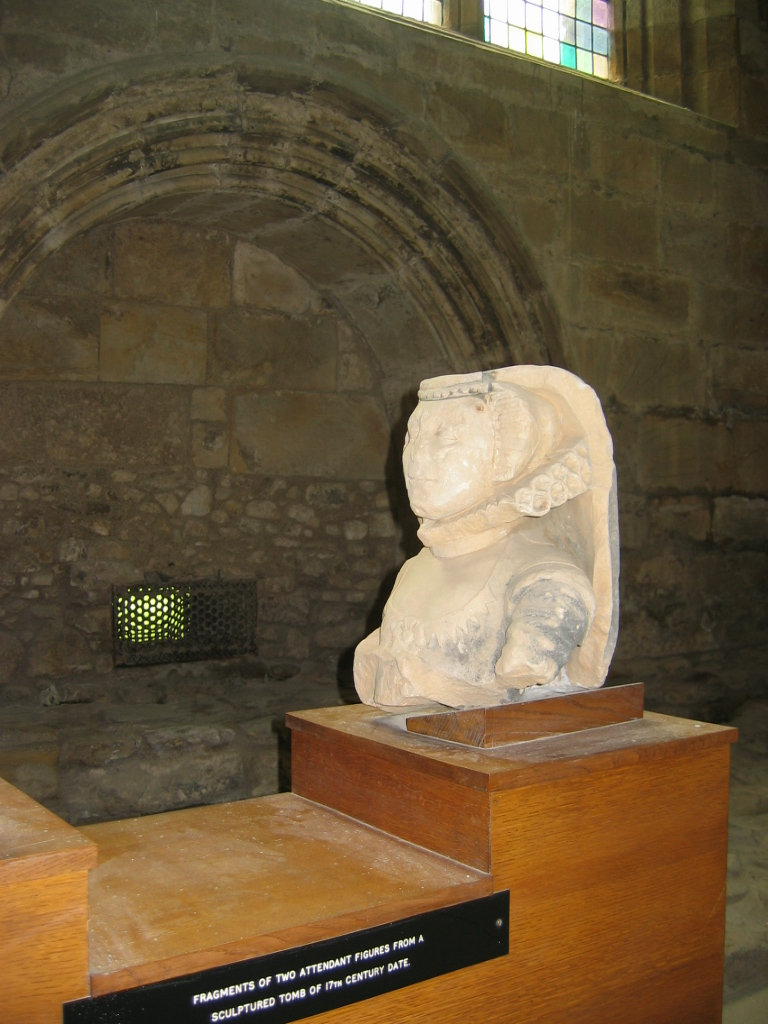

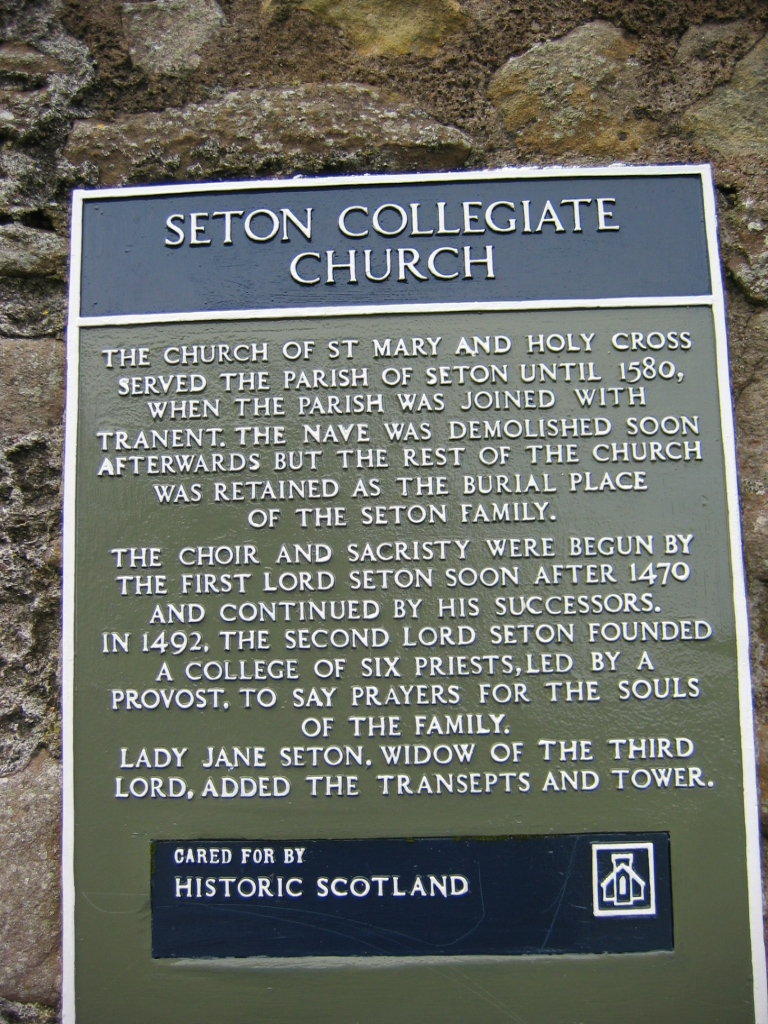

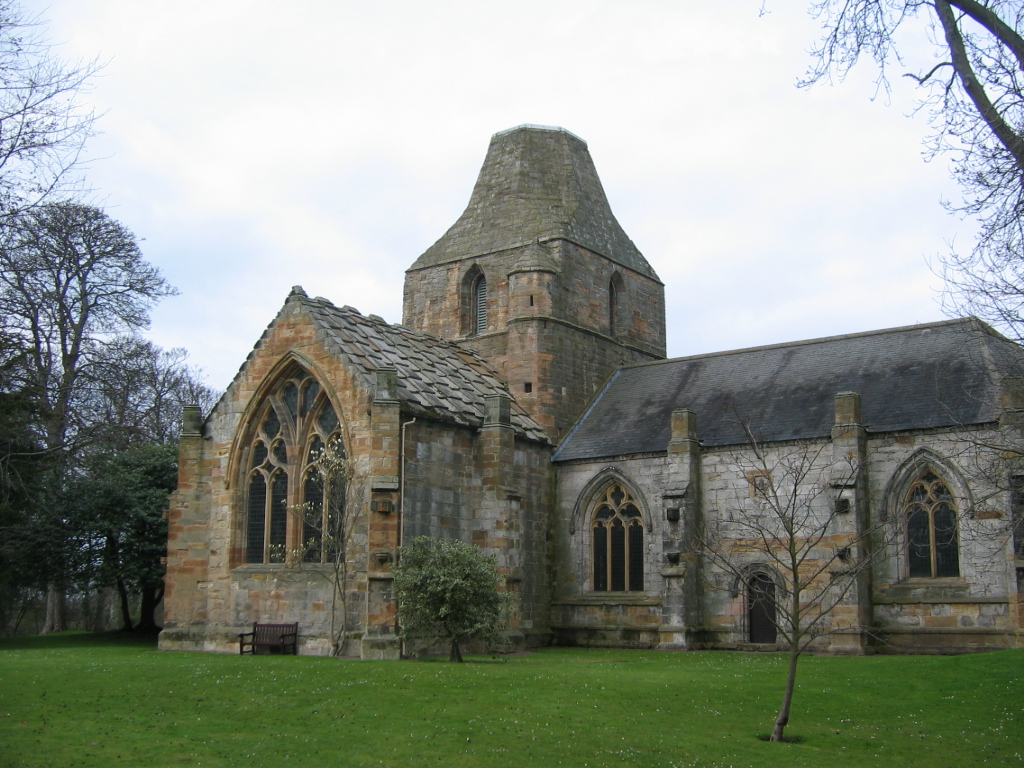

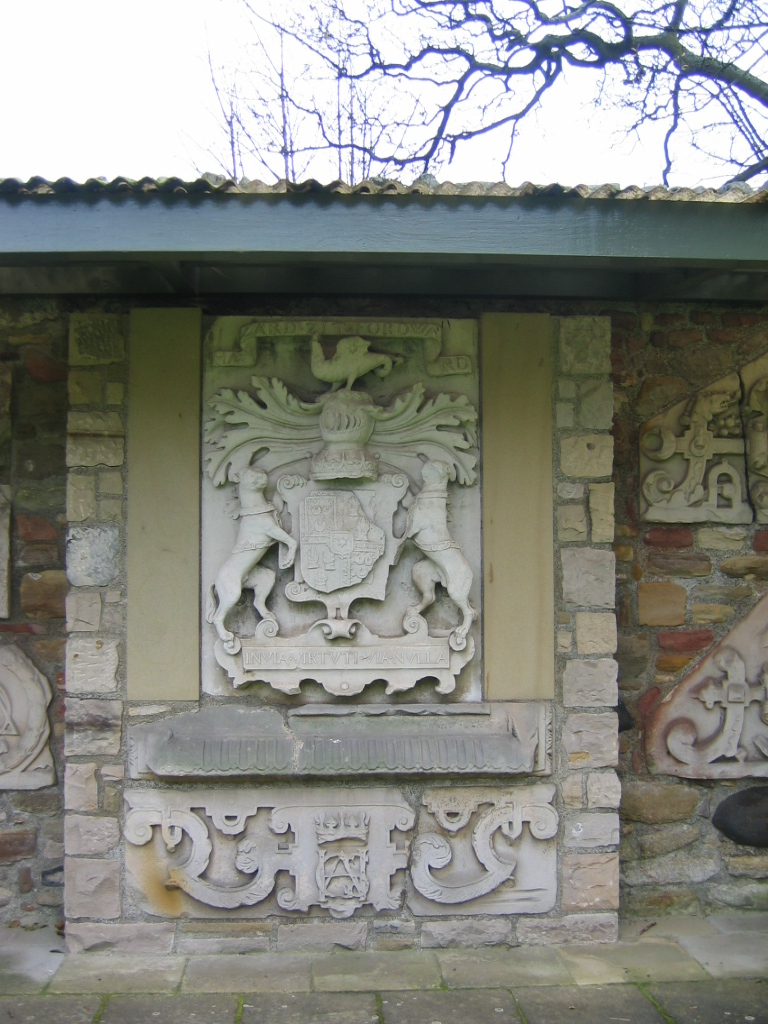

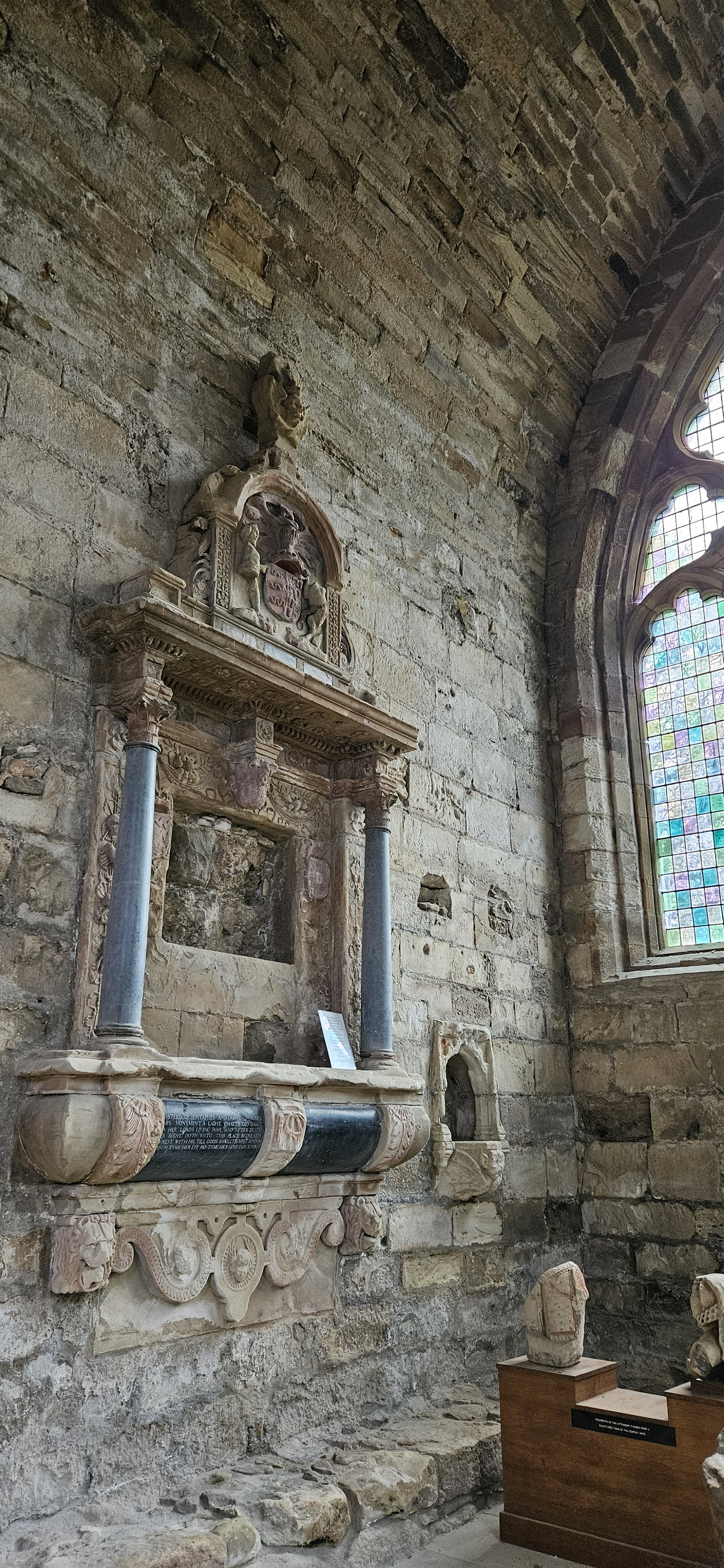

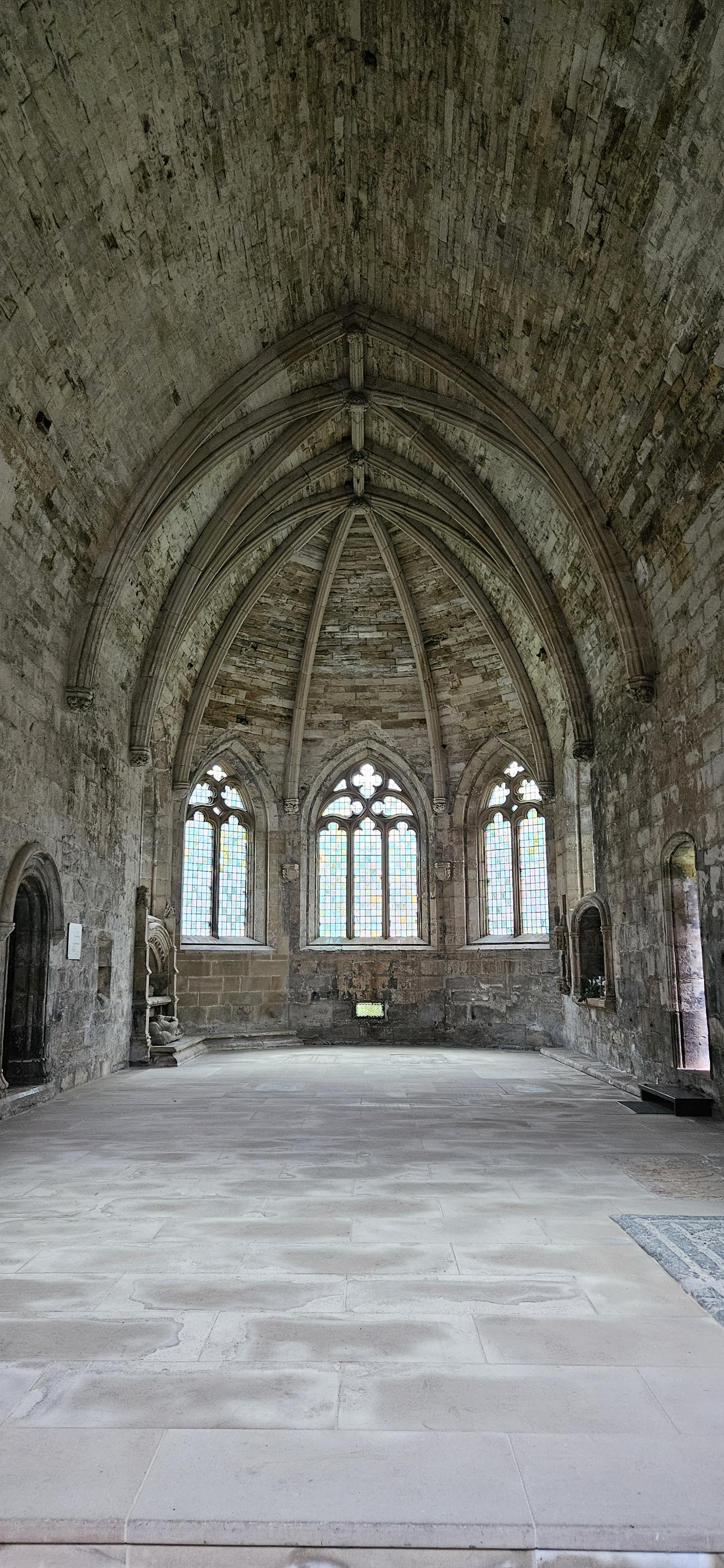

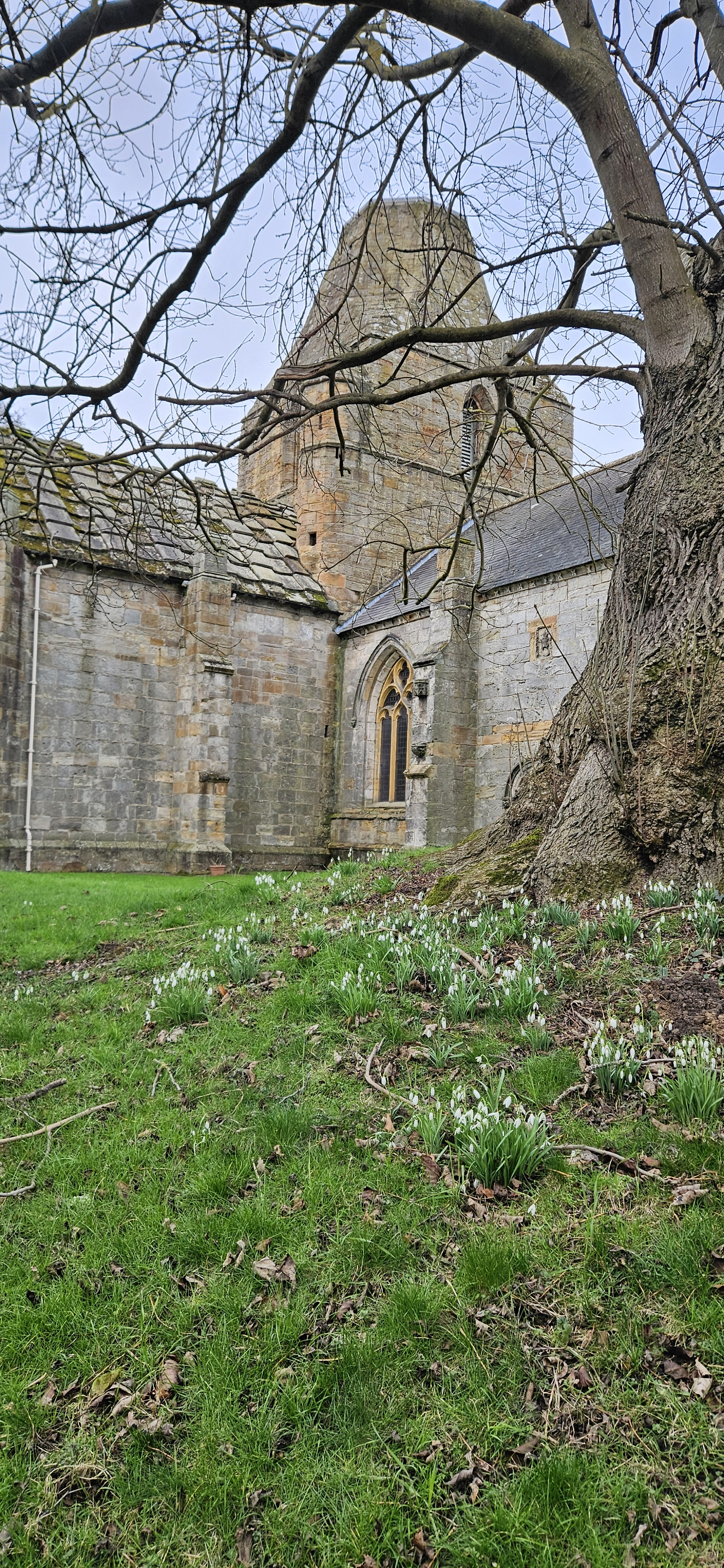

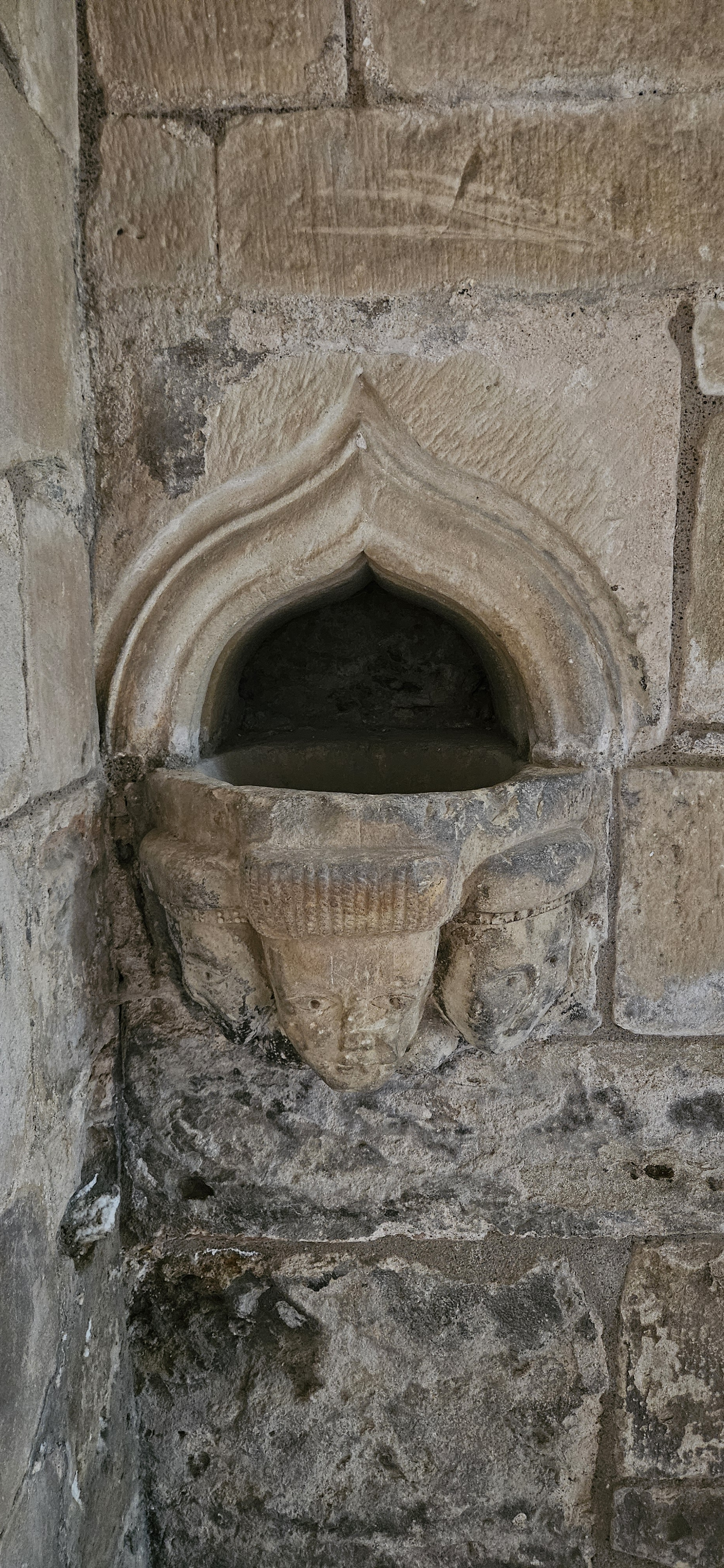
