= George Seton (disambiguation) =

George Seton (1822–1908) was a Scottish historian and philanthropist.

George Seton may also refer to:

- George Seton, 2nd Lord Seton (1415–1478), Lord of Parliament, Lord Auditor, and Scottish ambassador
- George Seton, 5th Lord Seton (died 1513), Scottish nobleman
- George Seton, 6th Lord Seton (died 1549), Lord of the Parliament of Scotland
- George Seton, 7th Lord Seton (1531–1586), Lord of the Parliament of Scotland
- George Seton, 3rd Earl of Winton (1584–1650), Royalist and Cavalier
- George Seton, Lord Seton (1613–1648)
- George Seton, 4th Earl of Winton (c. 1641–1704), Scottish Royalist, Privy Councillor, and Sheriff of Haddingtonshire
- George Seton, 5th Earl of Winton (1678–1749), Scottish nobleman
