= Winton Castle =

Historic building set in a large estate in East Lothian, Scotland

Coordinates: 55.915251°N 2.900461°W

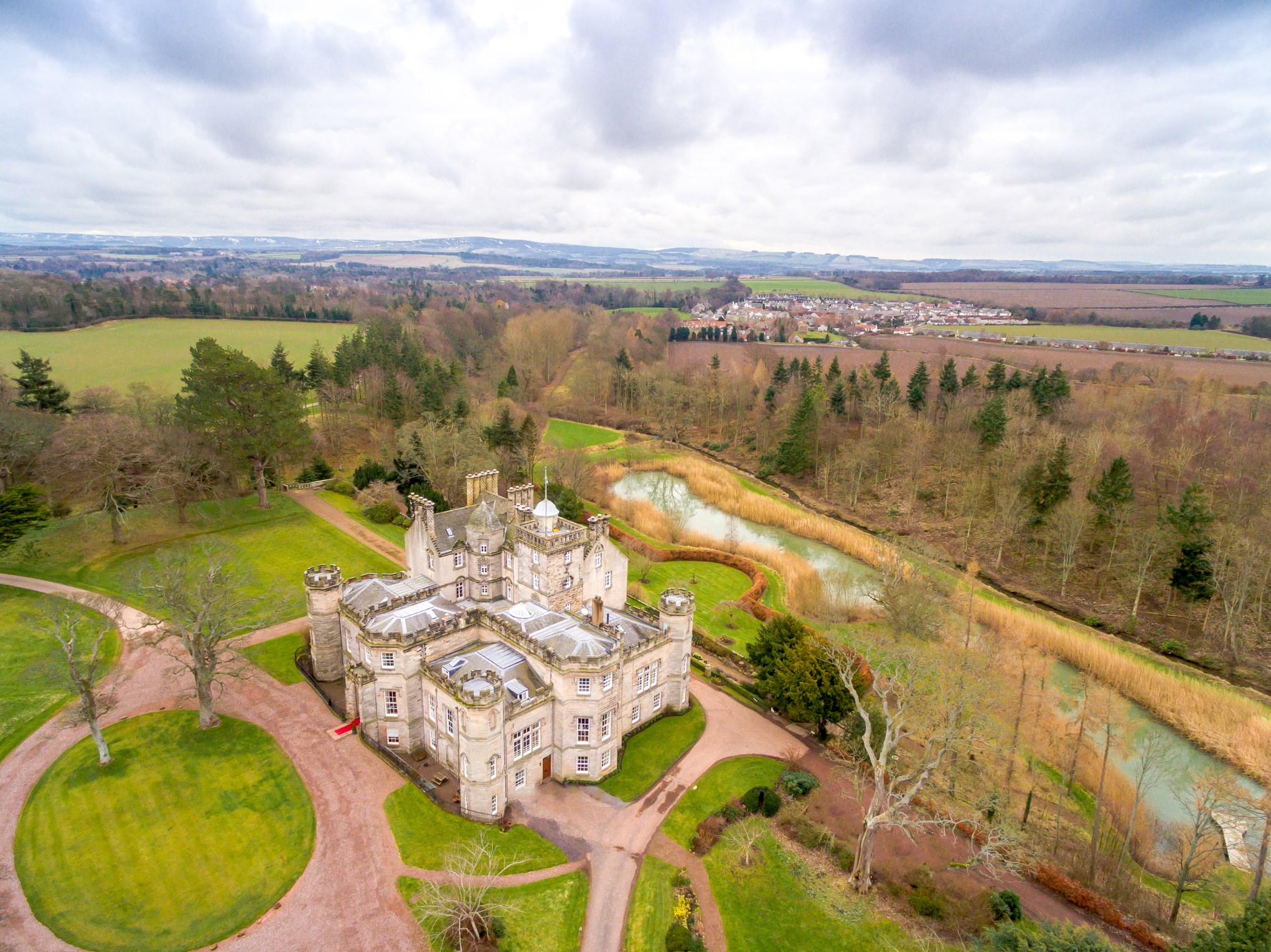
- Aerial view of Winton Castle

- Location in East Lothian
- Location: Pencaitland

History
- Built: 1620-1627, with additions circa 1805

Site notes
- Area: East Lothian
- Architect(s): William Wallace, with additions by John Paterson
- Architectural styles: Anglo-Scottish Renaissance, with Tudor style additions
- Owner: Sir Francis Ogilvy
- Website: https://www.wintoncastle.co.uk/

Listed Building – Category A
- Designated: 5 February 1971
- Reference no.: LB18948

Inventory of Gardens and Designed Landscapes in Scotland
- Official name: Winton Castle
- Designated: 1 July 1987
- Reference no.: GDL00387

Winton Castle is a historic building set in a large estate between Pencaitland and Tranent in East Lothian, Scotland. The castle is situated off the B6355 road approximately 0.5 miles (0.80 km) north of Pencaitland at grid reference NT437694.

The castle is still a private residence, and is run as an exclusive-use events venue.

== History ==
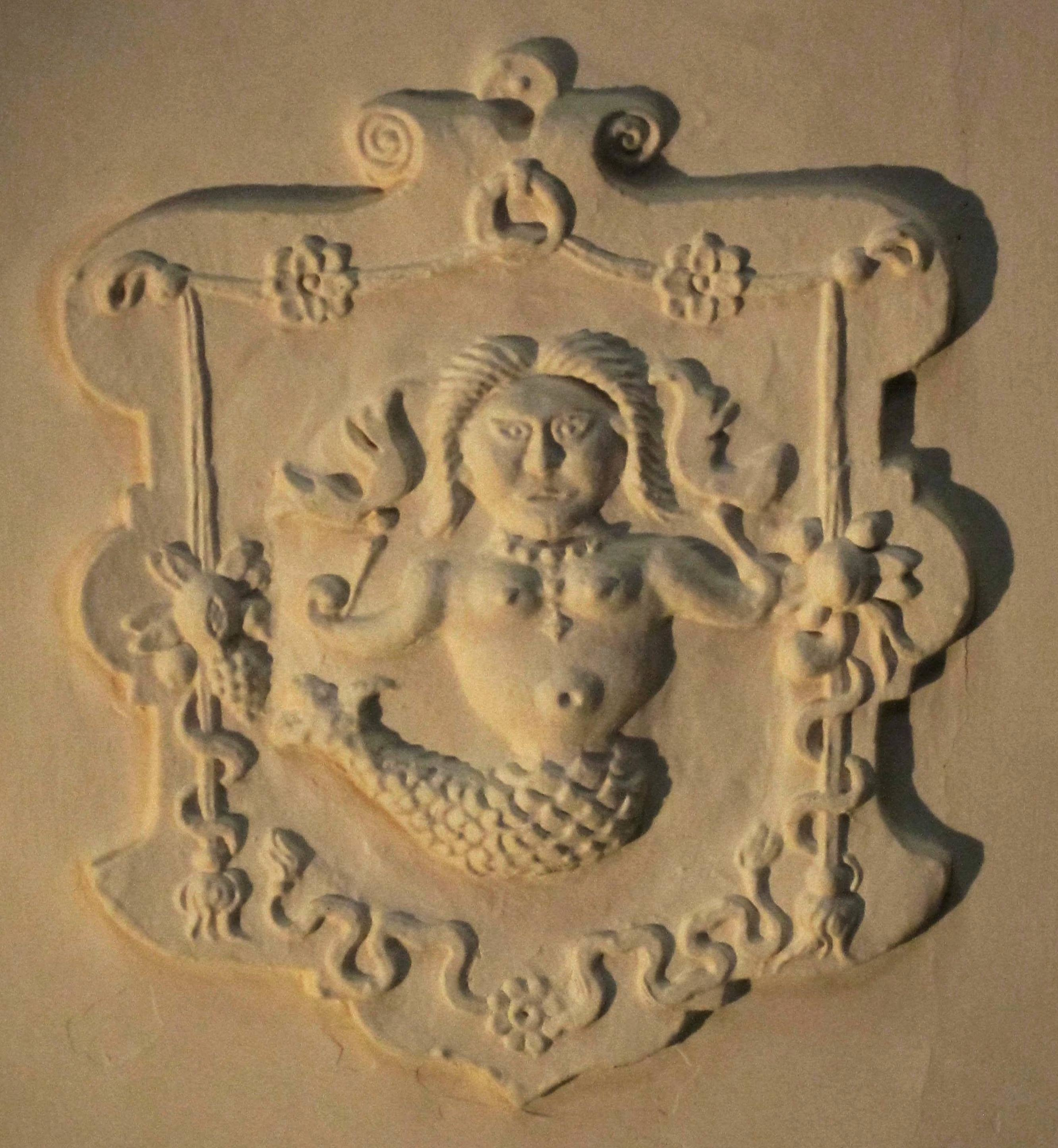
Plaster mermaid at Winton, possibly the work of John White

The Seton family were granted lands in East Lothian, including Winton, by King David I of Scotland in 1150. In the ensuing years the estate has passed through the hands of several eminent families. The origins of the castle date from 1480 when George, 4th Lord Seton, commenced the building of Wintoun Castle, a tower standing 4 stories high, surrounded by a defensive curtain wall. During the War of the Rough Wooing in 1544, Edward Seymour, Earl of Hertford, all but destroyed Wintoun Castle after bombardment and burning.

In 1600, the family were granted the Earldom of Winton and the 1st Earl immediately set about restoration of the castle, although work ceased upon his death in 1603. His son Robert, the 2nd Earl, resigned the title which passed to his younger brother George. George commissioned William Wallace, master-mason to the king, to oversee the completion of the restoration in 1620. A mason who laid flagstones in the kitchen, William Pedden, also worked at Preston Tower. One of the plasterers who made the fine ceilings was John White or "Quhyte", who also worked for Lady Home at The Hirsel. White was killed at Dunglass Castle when it was destroyed by an explosion in August 1640.

The completed castle was more palatial than defensive, in keeping with a new confidence after the turbulent 16th century, but has some similarities with the older and long-demolished family home at Seton Palace. Prince Charles, the future King Charles I of Scotland and England, was said to have visited Winton Castle, having been tutored by Alexander Seton, 1st Earl of Dunfermline who resided at nearby Pinkie House. Charles' son, King Charles II also visited the house.

In 1715, when George Seton, 5th Earl of Winton was captured at the Battle of Preston, during the Jacobite rising of 1715. His and his family's support of the exiled House of Stuart led to the Earl's imprisonment in the Tower of London, and his assets, titles and lands were confiscated. The York Buildings Company took over the Seton lands. In September 1745, Prince Charles Edward Stuart requisitioned Winton, to garrison his troops during the Jacobite rising of 1745, in the name of the Earl of Winton. The Jacobites were victorious at the nearby Battle of Prestonpans, fought on 21 September.

Sir David's Loch

== A new era ==
In 1779, Mrs Hamilton Nisbet of Pencaitland bought the castle and estate at Winton. On her death in 1797, the lands were passed to her son Colonel John Hamilton and it was he who further improved the castle by employing architect John Paterson. As well as extensive building work on the castle, Colonel Hamilton also planted extensively on the estate. Paterson's new neo-Gothic work can still be seen at Winton.

The castle passed down through the female line and, in 1846, came into the hands of Mary, Lady Ruthven. She did much for the village of Pencaitland, including building a new school. She also built a new hamlet, New Winton, to house the estate workers as their houses on the estate were becoming unfit for human habitation. She also carried out many improvements to castle and estate. In 1885, the house was passed to Lady Ruthven's cousin, Constance Nisbet Hamilton. Constance married Henry Ogilvy of Inverquarity in 1888. On her death in 1920, Winton Castle passed to Henry's nephew Gilbert Ogilvy, an architect. Henry, the new Laird of Winton, did much to improve the estate. He removed the Regency extension on the east wing, bridged the 19th-century north castellated lodges, and built the laundry house. He also carried out major work on the land, cutting and ploughing before planting hundreds of new trees. Gilbert Ogilvy died in 1953, the estate passing to his son David, who like his forebears, did much, with his wife Penelope, to improve Winton Castle and estate. Sir David inherited the Baronetcy from his uncle in 1956 and died in 1992, with Winton passed to his son, Sir Francis Ogilvy, 14th Baronet of Inverquarity, and his wife Dorothy. The loch in front of the house was named in remembrance of Sir David.

From 1977 until 1999, a flat within the castle was home to George and Frances (née Burn) Storrier. The couple separated in 1998, with George Storrier remaining in the flat until his 1999 detention to Carstairs Psychiatric Unit for the culpable homicide of his estranged wife Frances Storrier.

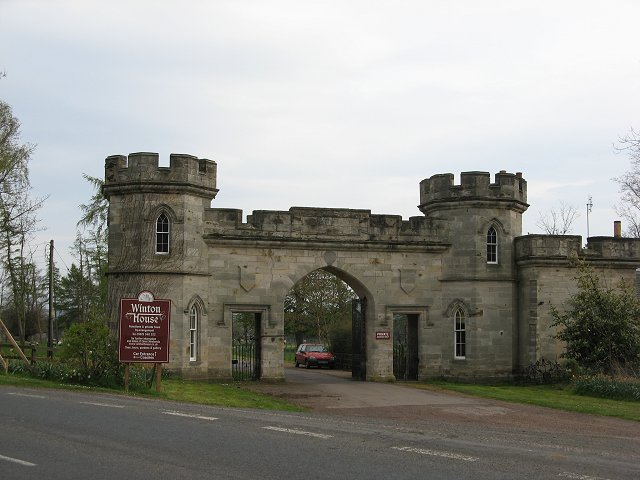
North Lodge, Winton Castle

== Today ==
Winton Castle is considered a masterpiece of Scottish Renaissance architecture. It contains ornate and intricate plaster ceilings, fine furniture, family treasures and many paintings by notable Scottish painters. Winton Castle is a category A listed building. The Castle is now run as an events venue.

=== Gardens ===
The gardens are terraced to the banks of St. David's Loch and up to the walled garden. There are several routed walkways, open to the public, passing through the estate woodlands and along the banks of the Tyne Water.
