= Anna Hay, Countess of Winton =

Scottish courtier

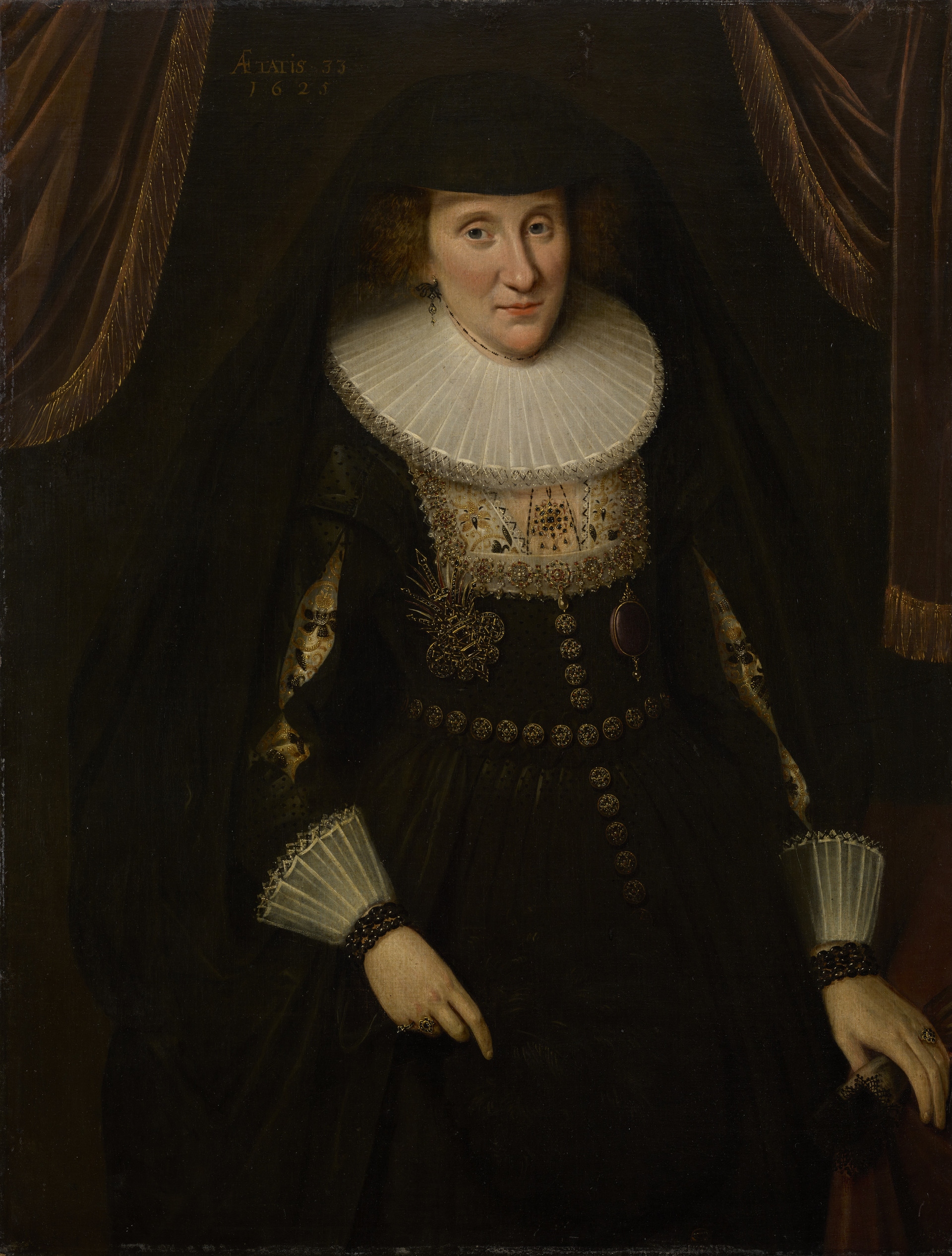
Anna Hay, Countess of Winton by Adam de Colone

Anna Hay, Countess of Winton (1592 – 1628) was a Scottish courtier.

She was the eldest daughter of Francis Hay, 9th Earl of Erroll and Elizabeth Douglas, Countess of Erroll.

== At court in England ==
Lady Anna Hay joined the household of Anne of Denmark, the wife of King James VI. She had high status in the household, and after the Union of the Crowns, in England, she and Jean Drummond had footmen.

In November 1603 the Spanish ambassador, the Count of Villamediana, invited the Duke of Lennox and the Earl of Mar to dinner. According to Arbella Stuart, he asked them "to bring the Scottish ladies for he was desirous to see some natural beauties." These included "my Cousin Drummond" and Anna Hay with Elizabeth Carey, and they were given presents of Spanish leather gloves and afterwards, jewellery. Anna Hay was sent a "gold chain of Spanish work" worth around 200 French crowns. Anna Hay was only 11 years old and her cousin and companion at court Anne Livingstone was around the same age. The queen's household was evidently suitable for children, Arbella Stuart commented on the children's games played in the queen's lodging at Winchester. Livingstone joined the separate household of Princess Elizabeth at Coombe Abbey, while Hay remained with the queen.

In 1604 the Spanish ambassadors, the Count of Villamediana and the Constable of Castile, gave gifts of jewels to those at court who were sympathetic to the Catholic cause and likely to support plans for the marriage of Prince Henry to a Spanish infanta. They gave Anna Hay a gold anchor studded with 39 diamonds, a piece commissioned from a Brussels jeweller Jean Guiset.

Another woman in the queen's household, Honora Denny, was known as "Lady Hay" after she married James Hay, 1st Earl of Carlisle in 1607. He was a distant relative of Anna Hay. Honora, Lady Hay was a great favourite of the queen and was said to have joined with her in a whispering campaign against the Venetian ambassador Antonio Foscarini.

== Countess of Winton ==
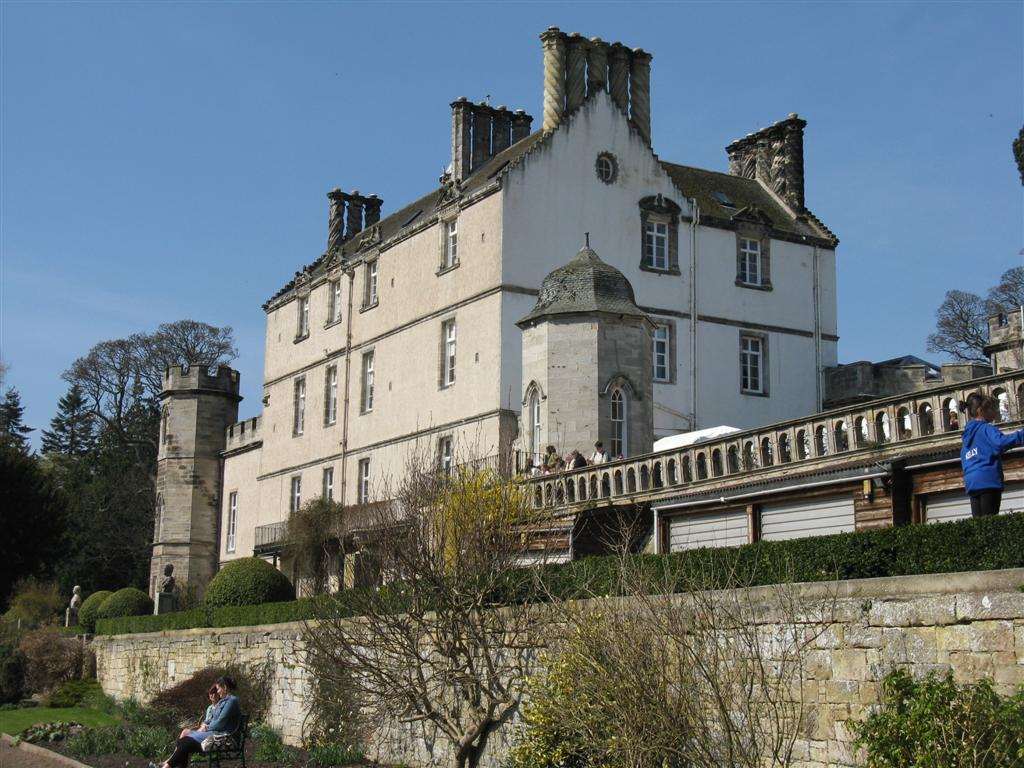
Winton House, Pencaitland, East Lothian

Anna Hay married George Seton, 3rd Earl of Winton on 26 April 1609. He had inherited after his elder brother Robert Seton, 2nd Earl of Winton resigned the title and estates to him in 1606, due to incapacity. He rebuilt Winton Castle around 1620, and had a townhouse in Edinburgh's Canongate. A fireplace at Winton in the hall or drawing room includes their carved initials "GS-AH" as a monogram.

Women in early modern Scotland did not change their surname on marriage. She continued to sign letters as "Anna Hay".

In 1612 Anne of Denmark sent instructions to the chamberlain of her Dunfermline estates, Sir Henry Wardlaw of Pitreavie for the baptism of Anne Home, a daughter of Mary (Dudley) Sutton, Countess of Home and the Earl of Home. The queen as sponsor or godmother wanted presents of money distributed at the baptism, and Anna Hay, Lady Winton was to be her representative.

Lord Walden visited Seton Palace to see Anna Hay and her children in 1613. Her mother-in-law, Margaret Montgomerie, dowager Countess of Winton, lived at Seton.

In September 1617, she wrote from Seton Palace to Anne Livingstone, Countess of Eglinton, a former companion in the household of Anne of Denmark who had married her husband's brother. Lady Eglinton's son Henry had sent her son George a trumpet, and George would get a drum for Henry.

In October 1618, she went north "over the water" to Erroll, to Slains Castle, with her children George and Margaret. She met the new "Lady Hay", the bride of her brother William Hay. Anna Hay wrote that her new sister-in-law, Anne Lyon was "wise, discreet, and a sweet creature". Anne Lyon was a daughter of the Earl of Kinghorne and Anne Murray, reputed to have been the mistress of King James.

The family had an interest in coal mining. On 5 November 1620, the Earl and Anna Hay with other neighbouring landowners had dinner with Janet Lawson, Lady Fawside, at Fa'side Castle and illegally combined to set and raise the price of coal. The Privy Council of Scotland found their actions unlawful and they were ordered to pay a fine of £2,000 or be imprisoned in Edinburgh Castle. In defence the landowners claimed their coal was unprofitable.

The Earl of Winton's account book (now lost) includes payments to Adam de Colone for portraits of the family, including Anne Lyon, Lady Hay. The inscription on the portrait of Anna Hay attributed to Adam de Colone indicates she was 33 in 1625. She wears a portrait miniature case and an enormous diamond aigrette pinned to her gown.

A portrait at Traquair House shows a woman in almost identical costume and pose, with two children, said to be Jean Ker, Countess of Perth. Another portrait labelled Anna Hay in quite different costume is also dated 1625.

Her children included:

- George Seton, Lord Seton (d.1648), who married Henrietta Gordon, a daughter of George Gordon, 2nd Marquess of Huntly
- Alexander Seton, 1st Viscount of Kingston
- Margaret Seton (1617-1637).
- Elizabeth Seton (1621–1650), who married in 1637, William Keith, 7th Earl Marischal
- Isobel Seton, who married John Glendinning of Parton
- Anna Seton, who injured her leg in 1627.
