= Robert Seton =

Robert Seton may refer to:

- Robert Seton (bishop) (1839–1927), American Catholic prelate
- Robert Seton, 1st Earl of Winton (1553–1603), Scottish peer who supported Mary, Queen of Scots
- Robert Seton, 2nd Earl of Winton (c. 1585–1634), Scottish peer
