= William Seton of Kylesmure =

Scottish landowner and postmaster

William Seton of Kylesmure (1562-1635) was a Scottish landowner, postmaster, Sheriff of Edinburgh, and administrator of the jointure lands of Anne of Denmark in Scotland.

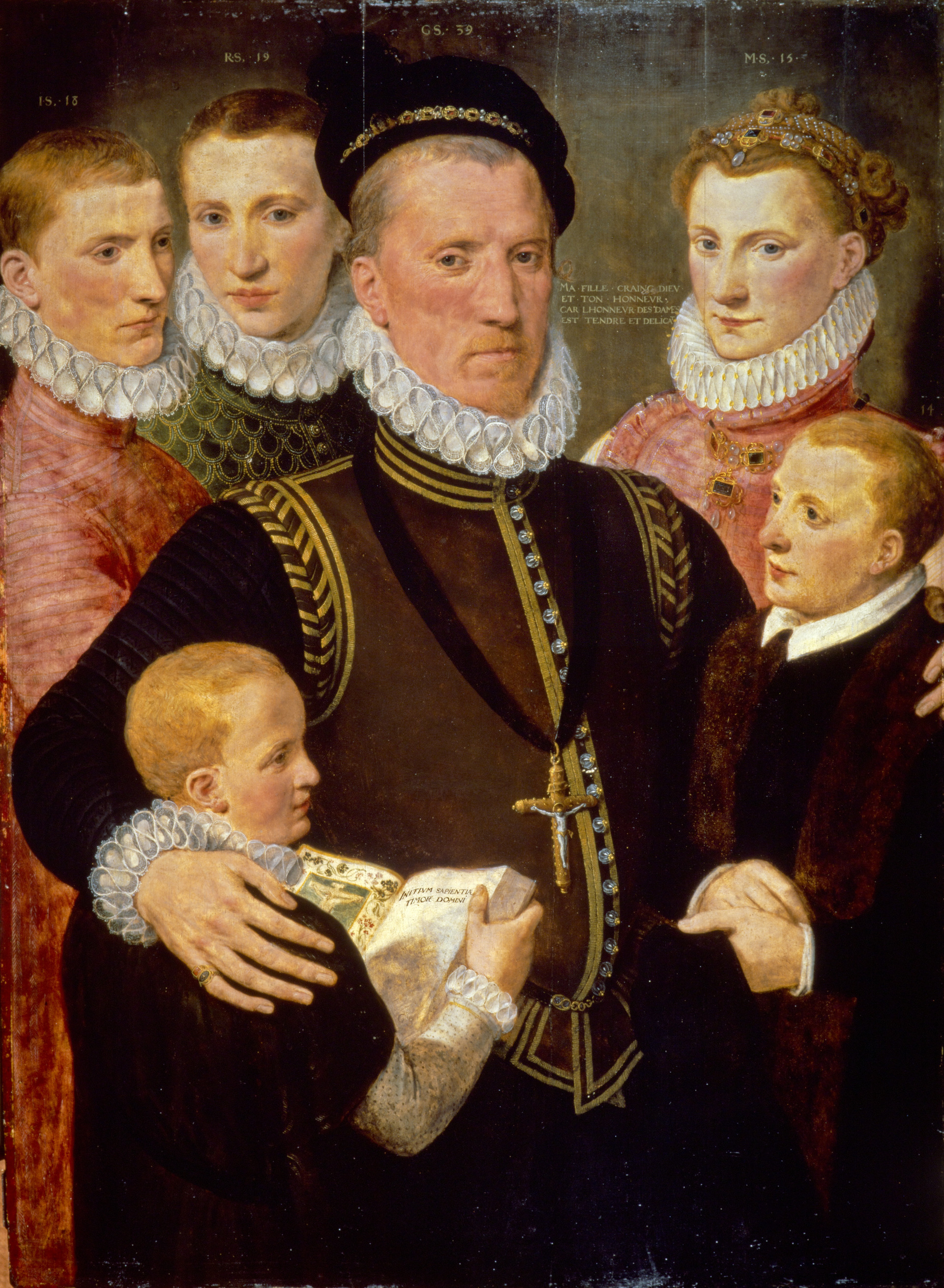
George, Lord Seton, and his children in 1572, including Margaret, Lady Paisley, Robert, Earl of Winton, Sir John Seton of Barns, Alexander Seton, and William Seton

He was a son of George Seton, 7th Lord Seton and Isobel Hamilton, a daughter of William Hamilton of Sanquhar. He lived at Haddington, East Lothian.

== Pacification of the border region ==
In 1605 Seton was appointed to the commission for the pacification of the Scottish Borders, a body set up after the Union of the Crowns. The other commissioners, including Gideon Murray, were more clearly integrated into border family networks. Seton was probably chosen because he was a brother of the newly appointed Scottish chancellor, Alexander Seton, 1st Earl of Dunfermline.

== Exchanging earldoms ==
His nephew, Robert Seton, 2nd Earl of Winton due to incapacity resigned his earldom to his younger brother George Seton, 3rd Earl of Winton in 1606. William Seton took part in the necessary legal transactions as an uncle and advisor of Robert Seton.

In 1612 he gave advice to Anne Livingstone, a former maid of honour of Anne of Denmark, who had married his nephew Alexander Seton of Foulstruther. They hoped that Alexander Seton would be made Earl of Eglinton. William Seton wrote to Anne Livingstone to discuss a letter from an influential courtier Lady Jane Drummond. His advice was that she should write to Jane Drummond and Anne of Denmark, to persuade them to influence King James in her favour. She should include in her letters that she had served Princess Elizabeth from her infancy, and later Anne of Denmark. He asked her to ensure that Jane Drummond and the queen inform King James that the queen had known and approved of plans for her marriage, but only on the basis that Alexander Seton of Foulstruther would become Earl of Eglinton.

William Seton came before the Privy Council of Scotland on 18 May 1613 on behalf of his nephew. He discussed the intricacies of the change of surname. The Privy Council acknowledged various documents and Foulstruther's statement, but felt that only the Court of Session was competent to pass judgement. Finally, in March 1615, the Earl of Dunfermline proclaimed his nephew Earl of Englinton, according to instructions from King James forwarded by John Murray of the Bedchamber.

== Sheriff and Postmaster ==
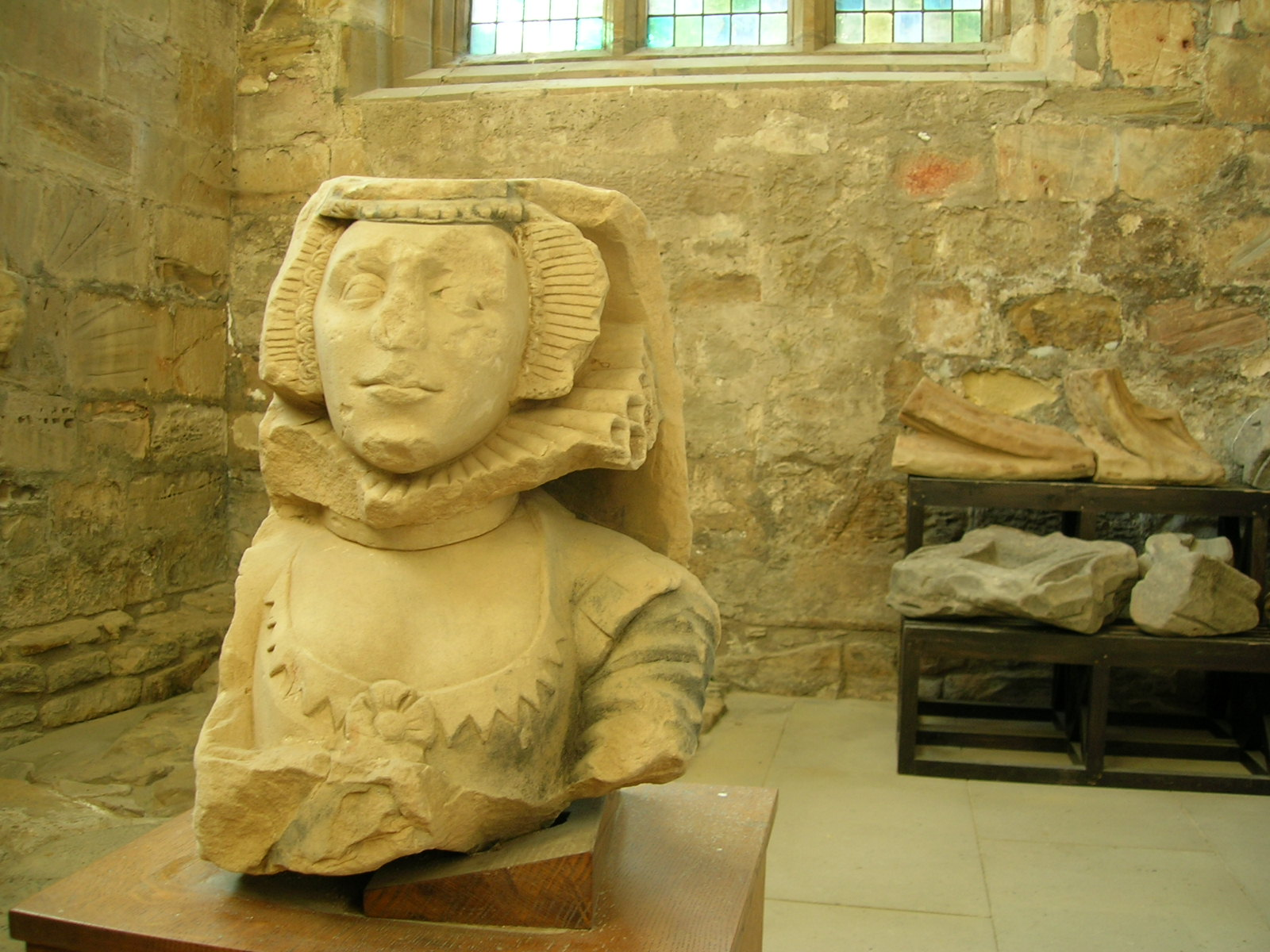
Fragment from a 17th-century family tomb at Seton Collegiate Church

As Sheriff of Edinburgh he held a justice court at Peebles in 1616. 41 cases were heard and 21 culprits were hanged. He wrote to the King's advocate Lord Binning after the executions regretting the waste of men of relatively good standing who might otherwise have been of good service.

He acquired a great lodging and a vacant ground in the Maygate of Dunfermline in 1616 from Patrick Murray of Pardewis. The property was transferred to his brother, the Earl of Dunfermline, in 1619. In his 1622 will, the Earl of Dunfermline directed the Earl of Winton and his brother Sir William Seton to complete his building work at Pinkie House.

In April 1617 Anne of Denmark made new appointments to the advisory committee managing her estates in Scotland, and Kylesmure was made a counsellor.

In 1619 as Postmaster he convened the postmasters of Cocksburnspath, Haddington, and the Canongate before the Privy Council to discuss problems with the postal service towards England. In July 1619 the Chancellor wrote to King James reminding him that Kylesmure was exempted from serving as a Justice of the Peace for Haddingtonshire.

He died in 1635 and was buried at Seton Collegiate Church.

== Marriage and family ==
William Seton married Agnes Sinclair, or Agnes Stirling, a daughter of Stirling of Glorat. Their children included:

- William Seton
- John Seton, a soldier in France, in the Scots regiment of Colonel Hepburn.
- A daughter who married John Auchmoutie in 1616. Anne Livingstone, Countess of Eglinton was a guest.

== See also ==
Postmaster General for Scotland
