= George Seton, Lord Seton =

Scottish landowner

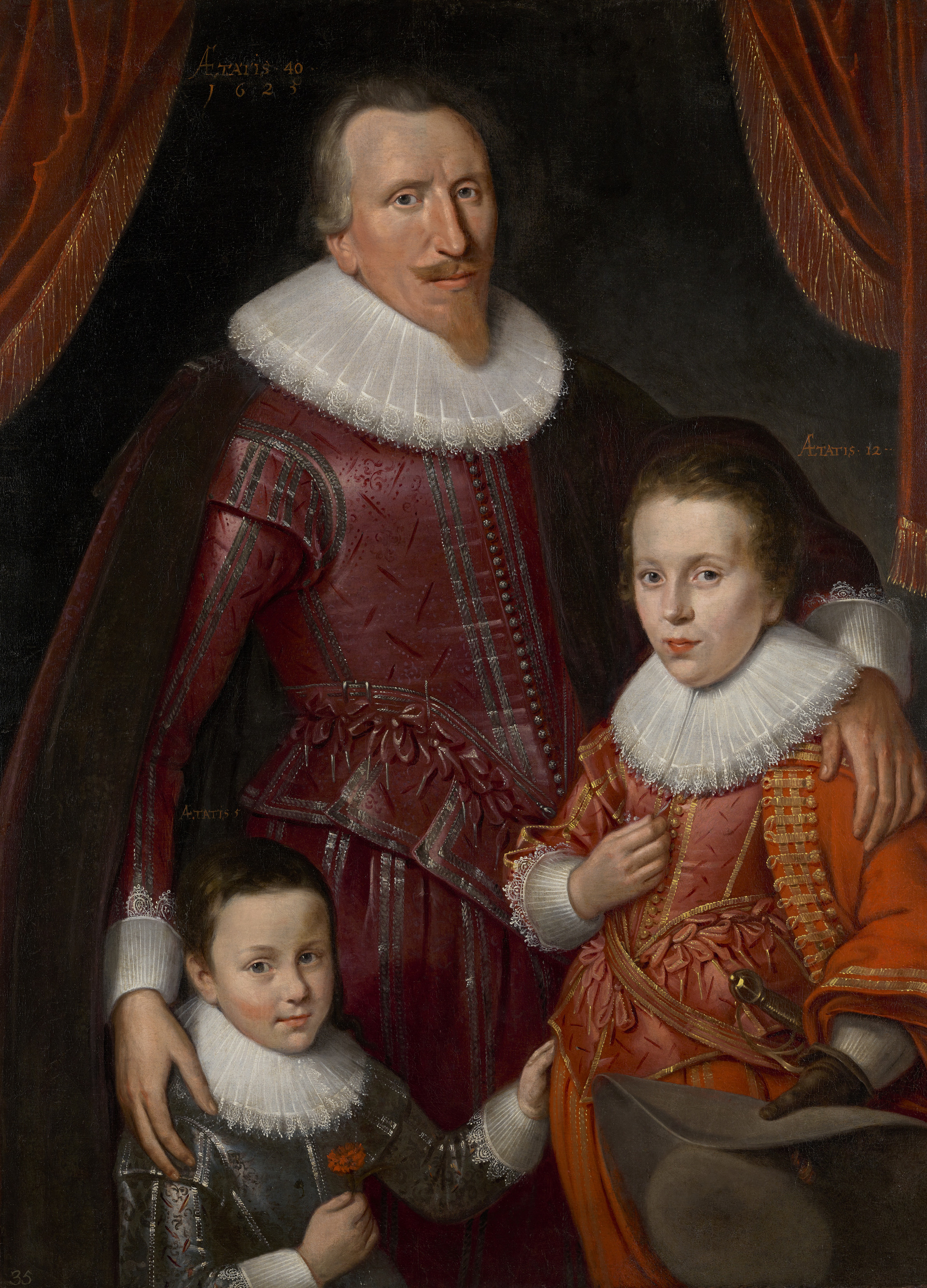
The 3rd Earl of Winton with his sons George and Alexander

George Seton, Lord Seton, Master of Winton (15 May 1613 – 4 June 1648) was a Scottish landowner.

He was the eldest surviving son of George Seton, 3rd Earl of Winton and Anna Hay. He continued the family's long-standing Roman Catholic traditions. Through his father's influence, in 1639 he married Lady Henrietta Gordon, daughter of the Marquess of Huntly, with whom he made a great match and by whom he had four sons, of whom George succeeded his grandfather as fourth Earl of Winton, and the others died young or without issue.

Seton showed great military abilities and was firmly attached to the Royalist cause.

The family estates flourished under his stewardship, his father providing many opportunities to learn and excel at managing the family affairs, during the many troubles of the 17th century. Seton suffered great hardships at the hands of the rebels during the English Civil War, and his father had to sell long-held family estates in Linlithgowshire, that of Niddry Castle and one at Winchburgh, to rescue him from imprisonment. He died at Seton Palace on 4 June 1648, prematurely and unexpectedly of an illness probably caused by his imprisonment, predeceasing his father.

Seton's coat of arms appears in a large memorial window to the great Marquess of Montrose in St Giles' Cathedral, Edinburgh, as Seton was a prominent companion of that illustrious Royalist commander.
