= William Wallace (mason) =

Scottish master mason and architect

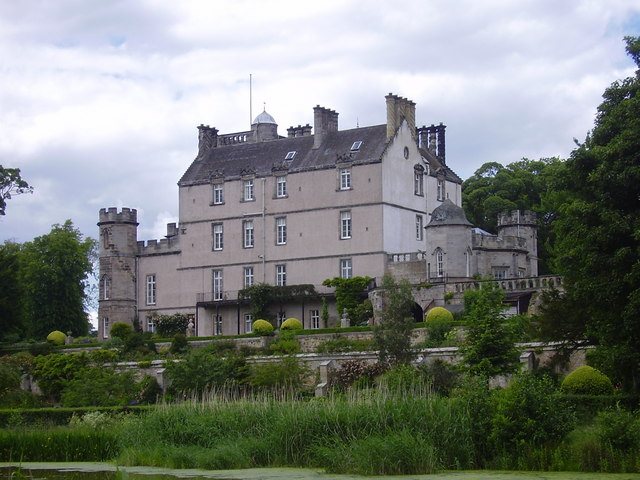
Winton House, rebuilt by Wallace in the 1620s

William Wallace (died 1631) was a Scottish master mason and architect. He served as King's Master Mason under James VI.

From 1615, Wallace is known to have been the leading mason working on the King's Lodgings at Edinburgh Castle. On 18 April 1617 he was appointed King's Master Mason, holding this post until his death. Wallace was commissioned in 1618 to rebuild the north range of Linlithgow Palace, which had collapsed in 1605. He was responsible for design as well as building, and executed the new range in an Anglo-Flemish style, which he helped to popularise in Scotland.

He followed this with works to Winton House, near Pencaitland, for George Seton, 3rd Earl of Winton, which he undertook from 1620 to 1627. In 1621 he was made a burgess of Edinburgh, and later served as Deacon of the Edinburgh Masons Lodge. From 1628 until his death Wallace was engaged on the design and construction of Heriot's Hospital, a school, again in the Anglo-Flemish style. He was almost certainly the principal designer of the building, which was continued after his death by William Aytoun. One of Wallace's last works was carving the monument to John Byres of Coates in Greyfriars Kirkyard, Edinburgh, unpaid for at his death, and his will also includes debts for works at Moray House for the Countess of Home.

In addition, Pinkie House and the original, unexecuted, design for Drumlanrig Castle have been attributed to Wallace on stylistic grounds, although no documentary evidence exists to confirm his involvement.
