= George Seton, 4th Earl of Winton =

Scottish Royalist, Privy Councillor and Sheriff of Haddingtonshire

George Seton, 4th Earl of Winton (c. 1641 – 6 March 1704) was a Scottish Royalist, Privy Councillor, and Sheriff of Haddingtonshire.

He was the son of George Seton, Master of Winton, and Lady Henrietta Gordon, a daughter of the 2nd Marquess of Huntly.

He was in Europe for his studies, a boy of under ten years of age, when he succeeded his grandfather in the family estates in 1650. Notwithstanding his youth, a heavy fine of £2000 was imposed on him by Cromwell's Act of Grace and Pardon in 1654.

His tutor and uncle was Lord Kingston, by whom he was brought up "in the true Protestant religion", thus severing the long attachment of his family to the Catholic Church. On 19 June 1656, Lord Kingston reported to the Haddington Presbytery by order of the Synod that Lord Winton had hitherto been educated in the Protestant Religion and his education should still be carefully attended to.

Lord Winton was accomplished in the knowledge of arms, and gave proof of his skill and gallantry serving with the French army at the siege of Besançon in 1660. Returning to England with a brilliant reputation he was well received by King Charles II, who appointed him a member of the Privy Council of Scotland, and give him command of the East Lothian Regiment of Foot against the Covenanters in 1666, following which he defeated the rebels at Pentland, and also, in 1679 he again commanded the same regiment "upon his own charges, with all his vassals, in noble equipage, in his Majestie's army of 14,000 men", at Bothwell Bridge, were the rebels were totally defeated. After the battle he entertained the Duke of Monmouth and all the Scottish and English officers with at Seton.

In 1682 he was appointed Sheriff of Haddingtonshire, and in May of the same year he accompanied the Duke of York from London to Edinburgh in the frigate Gloucester, which was wrecked, with great loss of life, on Yarmouth Sands. An interesting letter written to Mr. Hewer from Edinburgh, on Monday 8 May 1682, on this disaster is found in the correspondence of Samuel Pepys who was also with the Duke of York. In 1685, Lord Winton was appointed by King James II as Grand Master of the Household.

Also in 1685 Winton was again in action with his regiment, against the Earl of Argyll.

Professor Sinclair presented him with a work entitled Satan's Invisible world discovered – or A choice collection of relations anent devils, spirits, witches, and apparitions in 1685. The lengthy 'Epistle Dedicatory' is in a vein of exaggerated praise, somewhat relieved by a description of the Earl's coal-mining operations, in which Sinclair introduces the name of Athanasius Kircher, the Jesuit, who founded the Kircherian Museum in the Roman College, at Rome, and was one of the first natural philosophers and scientists of the age.

In 1691-93 he was in Holland, at Amsterdam and at Leyden, where he met travellers and learned men in whose company he delighted, as he was much given to mathematics and physical science.

This Earl did much to improve his property and to benefit the public. He built a new harbor at Cockenzie, called Port Seton, which still exists by this name, and has recently revived with Edinburgh people as a modest summer resort.

Alexander Nisbet says of this nobleman that "he imitated the extraordinary loyalty of his ancestors; none of them having ever been guilty of treason or rebellion, nor addicted or avarice, nor found with lands of the Church in their possession".

A special Royal Charter dated 31 July 1688, was granted to him of the Earldom of Wintoun, to him and the heirs male of his body, which failing, to whichever person he might nominate and the heirs male of their bodies, with remainder to his heirs male, and failing these to his nearest heirs and assignees whatsoever, the eldest daughter or her female succeeding without division, and marrying a gentleman of the surname of Seton, or who would assume that surname and carry the Wintoun Arms.

== Family ==
George, 4th Earl of Winton, married Christian (d. 1703), daughter and heiress of John Hepburn of Adinstoun in East Lothian. They had two sons:

- George Seton, 5th Earl of Winton
- Christopher Seton, (d. 5 January 1705)

Peerage of Scotland
Preceded by George Seton	Earl of Winton; 1650–1704	Succeeded by George Seton
