= Garleton Castle =

Scheduled monument in East Lothian, Scotland

Coordinates: 55.9807°N 2.7884°W

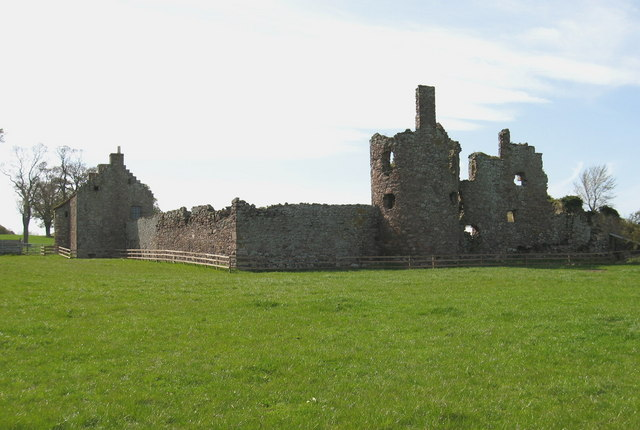
- Interactive map of the Garleton Castle area

General information
- Location: East Lothian, Haddington, Scotland

Garleton Castle is a courtyard castle, dating from the sixteenth century, about 1.5 miles (2.4 km) north of Haddington, just north of the Garleton Hills in East Lothian, Scotland.

== Structure ==
Garleton Castle once comprised three blocks within a curtain wall, but the main L-plan tower, which had two wings, is mostly demolished. While the second block has been converted to a farm cottage, the rectangular third block is still nearly complete. This block has two storeys, and a garret with crowstepped gables. Other features are the round stair-tower, and the gunloops piercing the walls. The gunloops are of the splayed variety, characteristic of the 16th century. The castle is rubble-built. Some of the curtain wall survives, and a round tower.

The interior, which has been altered considerably, includes a vaulted kitchen, equipped with a wide-arched fireplace, and another room with a canopied fireplace. The remains of the castle are protected as a category B listed building and as a Scheduled Ancient Monument.

== History ==
Garleton Castle belonged to the Lindsay family. It subsequently passed to the Towers of Innerleithen, and was sold by them to the Setons. Sir John Seton of Garleton was given the property by his father George Seton, 3rd Earl of Winton. By 1885 it could be described as a fragmentary ruin.

== Tradition ==
It is said the building was haunted by an apparition of a man at one stage, while the sound of heavy footsteps is said to have been heard. It is possible that Sir David Lyndsay, who wrote Ane Pleasant Satyre of the Thrie Estaitis was born in an earlier building at this site, in 1486.
