= Janet Hepburn =

Scottish religious patron and possible convent founder

Janet Hepburn (Lady Seton)
- Born: c. 1480
- Died: c. 1558
- Known for: Scottish noble woman who was a religious patron and the founder of the Dominican convent of Sciennes, Edinburgh

Janet Hepburn, Lady Seton (c. 1480 – c. 1558) was a Scottish woman who was a religious patron and possibly the founder of the Dominican convert of Sciennes, Edinburgh, sometimes before 20 January 1518.

== Early and personal life ==
Lady Janet Hepburn was born to Patrick Hepburn, 1st Earl of Bothwell and Janet 'Joanna' Douglas, Countess of Bothwell, daughter of Princess Joan Stewart and James Douglas, circa 1480.

Jane married George, 5th Lord Seton, before December 1506. He died at the Battle of Flodden Field in 1513.

Following the death of her husband, Lady Seton lived as a widow for another forty-five years.

Janet and Lord Seton had one surviving son, who later succeeded as George Seton, 6th Lord Seton, and a daughter, Mariota (or Marion), who married three times: first to Thomas, Master of Borthwick, then in 1530 to Hugh Montgomerie, 2nd Earl of Eglinton, and thirdly, Alexander Graham of Wallacetown.

Her grand-daughter, Mary Seton, became attendant to Mary, Queen of Scots.

== Patronage ==
Lady Janet Hepburn was the founder of the Dominican convent of 'Saint Catherine of Siena', of Sciennes, Edinburgh. This convent, was founded in 1517 by a bull decreed by Pope Leo X. However, the building was certainly erected and funded by her, possibly for her own benefit initially since she retired there once her sons were of age and able to manage the family state. Afterwards she remained a generous benefactor to the convent.

A pious lady, she also helped rebuild Seton Collegiate Church in the 1520s and had new extensions built. She also endowed two chaplains in the 1540s. She continued to make gifts to Seton Church throughout her life.

== Death ==
She died in 1558 and was buried next to her husband at Seton Church.

== Bibliography ==
- The New Biographical Dictionary of Scottish Women. Edinburgh University Press. 2006. p. 195. ISBN 978-1-4744-3628-1.
