= Sir John Seton, 1st Baronet =

Sir John Seton of Garleton (29 September 1639 – 1686) was a younger son of George Seton, 3rd Earl of Winton (died 1650), by his wife Elizabeth, daughter of John Maxwell, 7th Lord Herries of Terrigles.

He was created a baronet of Nova Scotia by King Charles II in 1664, and married Isabel or Christian Home, daughter of John Home of Renton, by whom he had several children, including his successor Sir George Seton, 2nd Baronet, of Garleton, and Athelstaneford, East Lothian.

His home was Garleton Castle.

This family became Jacobites and engaged in the 1715 Jacobite rising.

He died in 1686 and was buried at Athelstaneford.

== Family ==
The children of John Seton of Garleton and Christian Home included:

- George Seton of Garleton
- Margaret Seton, educated in a French nunnery, who died in Paris.

Baronetage of Nova Scotia
New creation	Baronet (of Garleton); 1664–1686	Succeeded by George Seton
