= George Seton, 6th Lord Seton =

George Seton IV, 6th Lord Seton (born: c. 1508; died 1549) was a Lord of the Parliament of Scotland.

He was the son of Janet Hepburn, daughter of Patrick Hepburn, 1st Earl of Bothwell. His father, the 5th Lord Seton was killed at the battle of Flodden and George's mother survived her husband by 45 years till 1558, managing the family's interests. When George came of age Janet joined the Convent of St Catherine at Sciennes in Edinburgh. After her son's death in 1549, she arranged the marriage of two of her granddaughters.

George Seton was appointed an Extraordinary Lord of Session on 5 March 1542. Like many Scottish nobles he gave his assent to the marriage proposed between Mary, Queen of Scots and Prince Edward of England in 1543. In that year, Seton was given custody of Cardinal Beaton who opposed the English marriage, but Seton allowed the Cardinal to escape.

He died in 1549, and was first buried at Culross Abbey as Seton Collegiate Church was in the occupied zone during the war of the Rough Wooing. Seton Palace and the church were damaged by the English army that burnt Edinburgh in May 1544.

Sir Richard Maitland, who had worked for the family in their legal affairs, began his History of the House of Seytoun at the request of the 6th Lord Seton, the fourth George of that name, but finished the work in the lifetime of his son George Seton, 7th Lord Seton.

== Elizabeth Hay ==
George first married Elizabeth Hay, daughter of John Hay, 3rd Lord Hay of Yester. They had seven children;

- George Seton, 7th Lord Seton, married Isobel Hamilton, daughter of William Hamilton of Sanquhar.
- John Seton, who married Isobel Balfour, heiress of Carrauldstoun or Carriston in Fife.
- Janet, died aged 2.
- Marion Seton, lady in waiting to Mary of Guise, married firstly John Graham, Earl of Menteith in 1548, with a dowry from Mary of Guise, by whom she had five children, and secondly John Gordon, Earl of Sutherland, the couple were poisoned at Helmsdale Castle by Isobel Sinclair, and died at Dunrobin Castle on 23 June 1567.
- Margaret Seton, married; firstly, Robert Logan of Restalrig, without issue; secondly David Hamilton of Ladyflat.
- Beatrix Seton, married George Ogilvie of Banff, heir of Walter Ogilvie of Dunlugus. Ancestors of Theodore Roosevelt.
- Heleanor Seton, married Hugh, Master of Somerville.

== Marie Pieris ==
George married secondly Marie Pieris, a French lady-in-waiting of Mary of Guise after handfasting at Falkland Palace in February 1539. She was the daughter of René Pierres, seigneur du Plessis Baudouin and Antoinette d'Hommes. The French Pierres family claimed to have descended from the Percy family of Northumberland. A grant from Mary, Queen of Scots to Marie in 1565 was addressed to "Dame Marie Pier, Lady Seytoun and Brieane." The couple were given a charter of the lands of Winchburgh and East Niddry on 27 June 1548. Marie's father wrote to Mary of Guise from Le Plessis Badouin in France. An undated letter survives from Marie to Mary of Guise, written from Niddry Castle, warning her that Lord Seton had heard of a plot by Regent Arran to seize the infant Mary, Queen of Scots.

Payments to "dame Marie Pierre, Lady Seyttoun" occur in the accounts of Mary, Queen of Scots.

George and Marie had children Robert, James, and Mary Seton, a companion of Mary, Queen of Scots.

On 29 August 1570, Marie and her son Robert were arrested for giving letters for Mary, Queen of Scots, to a messenger, John Moon. They were put on trial in Tolbooth at Edinburgh, on the charge that their letters denied the authority of James VI of Scotland and his representatives. They were released on their promise they would not write to Queen Mary again. During the Marian Civil War Marie Pieris stayed in Edinburgh Castle during the "lang siege" and helped make an inventory of the jewels of Mary, Queen of Scots remaining in the castle.

Peerage of Scotland
Preceded by George Seton	Lord Seton; 1513–1549	Succeeded by George Seton
