= Viscount Kingston =

Peerage title in Ireland and Scotland

The peerage title Viscount Kingston, has been created twice, once in Ireland and once in Scotland. The Scottish creation, which is actually rendered as Viscount of Kingston, was created in 1651 for Alexander Seton, and was forfeited in 1715 when the third viscount was attainted.

The Irish title was created in 1768 as a subsidiary title for the Earl of Kingston, and is still extant.

== Viscount of Kingston, Peerage of Scotland (1651) ==
- Alexander Seton, 1st Viscount of Kingston (1621–1691)
- Archibald Seton, 2nd Viscount of Kingston (1661–1713)
- James Seton, 3rd Viscount of Kingston (d. 1726) (forfeit 1715)

== Viscount Kingston, Peerage of Ireland (1766) ==
- subsidiary title of the Earl of Kingston (1768)
