= Pencaitland =

Village in East Lothian, Scotland

Coordinates: 55.911°N 2.891°W

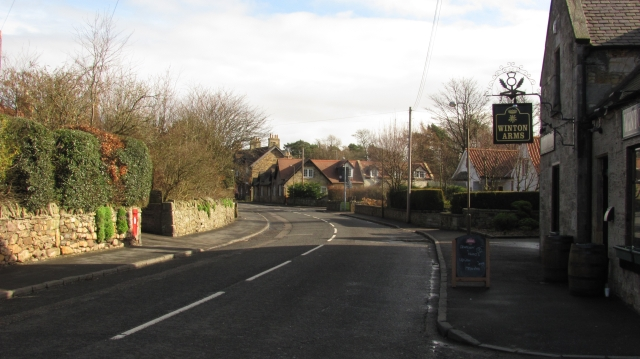
- Winton Arms, Pencaitland

- Location within East Lothian
- Population: 1,480 (2020)
- OS grid reference: NT443690
- Civil parish: Pencaitland
- Council area: East Lothian
- Lieutenancy area: East Lothian
- Country: Scotland
- Sovereign state: United Kingdom
- Post town: TRANENT
- Postcode district: EH34
- Dialling code: 01875
- Police: Scotland
- Fire: Scottish
- Ambulance: Scottish
- UK Parliament: East Lothian
- Scottish Parliament: East Lothian

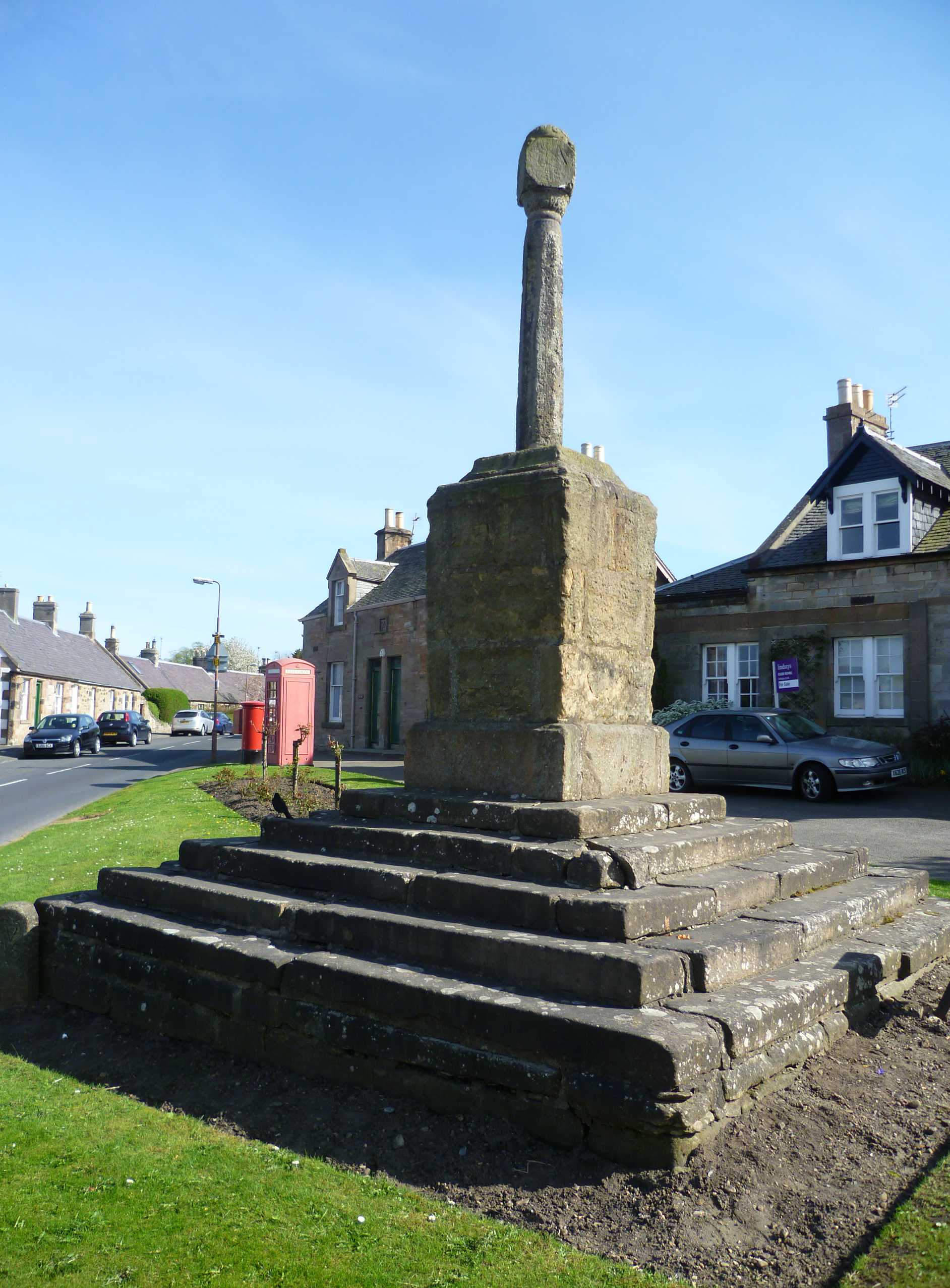
Cross at Pencaitland

Pencaitland is a village in East Lothian, Scotland, about 12 miles (19 kilometres) south-east of Edinburgh, 5 mi (8 km) south-west of Haddington, and 1 mi (2 km) east of Ormiston.

The land where the village lies is said to have been granted by William the Lion to Calum Cormack in 1169, who gave the church, with the tithes and other property belonging to it, to the monks of Kelso, in whose possession it remained till a short time prior to the accession of Robert Bruce. The land subsequently became the property of a younger branch of the Maxwell family, who granted the advowson and tithes to the monks of Dryburgh Abbey, who held them until the Reformation.

The Tyne Water divides the village into Easter Pencaitland and Wester Pencaitland, crossed by a three-arched bridge dating from the 16th Century. An ancient cross in Wester Pencaitland indicates that a market was regularly held there. A large industrial maltings, which was built in 1965, is situated just before the entrance to the village at Wester Pencaitland.

== Etymology ==
The name Pencaitland is first attested in 1296, as Penketland, Penkatlond and Penkatelen. It is thought derive either from the Brittonic language words corresponding to modern Welsh pen ('head, top, hill'), coed ('wood'), and llan ('clearing, enclosure'), in which case it once meant "head of a clearing or enclosure in or near a wood", or pen and coedlan ('copse'), in which case it meant "end of the copse".

== Pencaitland Community Council ==
Pencaitland Community Council meets 10 times throughout the year, typically on the last Wednesday of the month at the Trevelyan Hall in Wester Pencaitland. The Community Council is constituted from fifteen members of the local population along with the locally elected representatives of the Fa'side catchment. This catchment extends to New Winton and Boggs Holdings to the north and Peastonbank to the south.

== Winton Castle ==
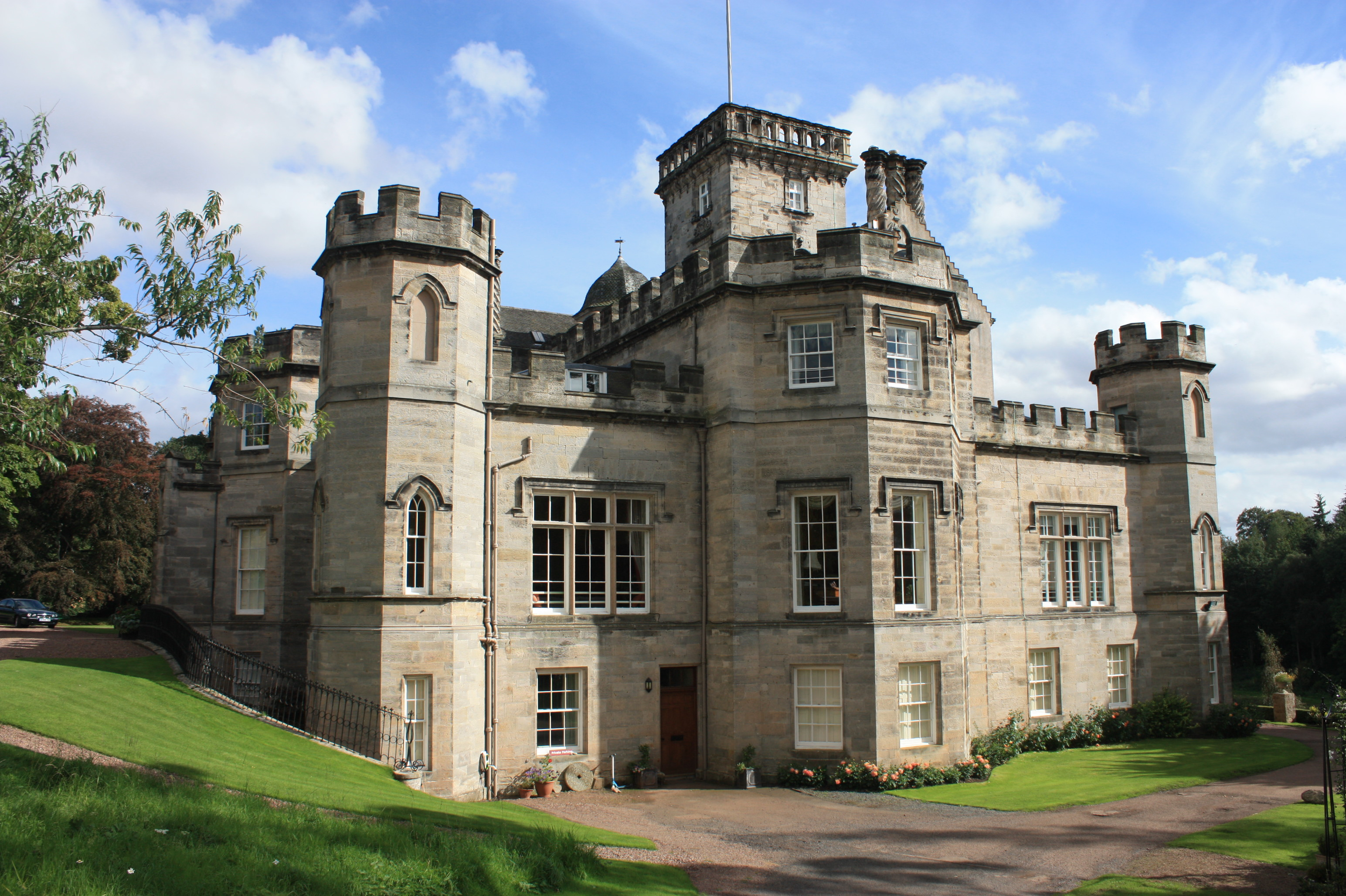
Winton Castle, Pencaitland, west front

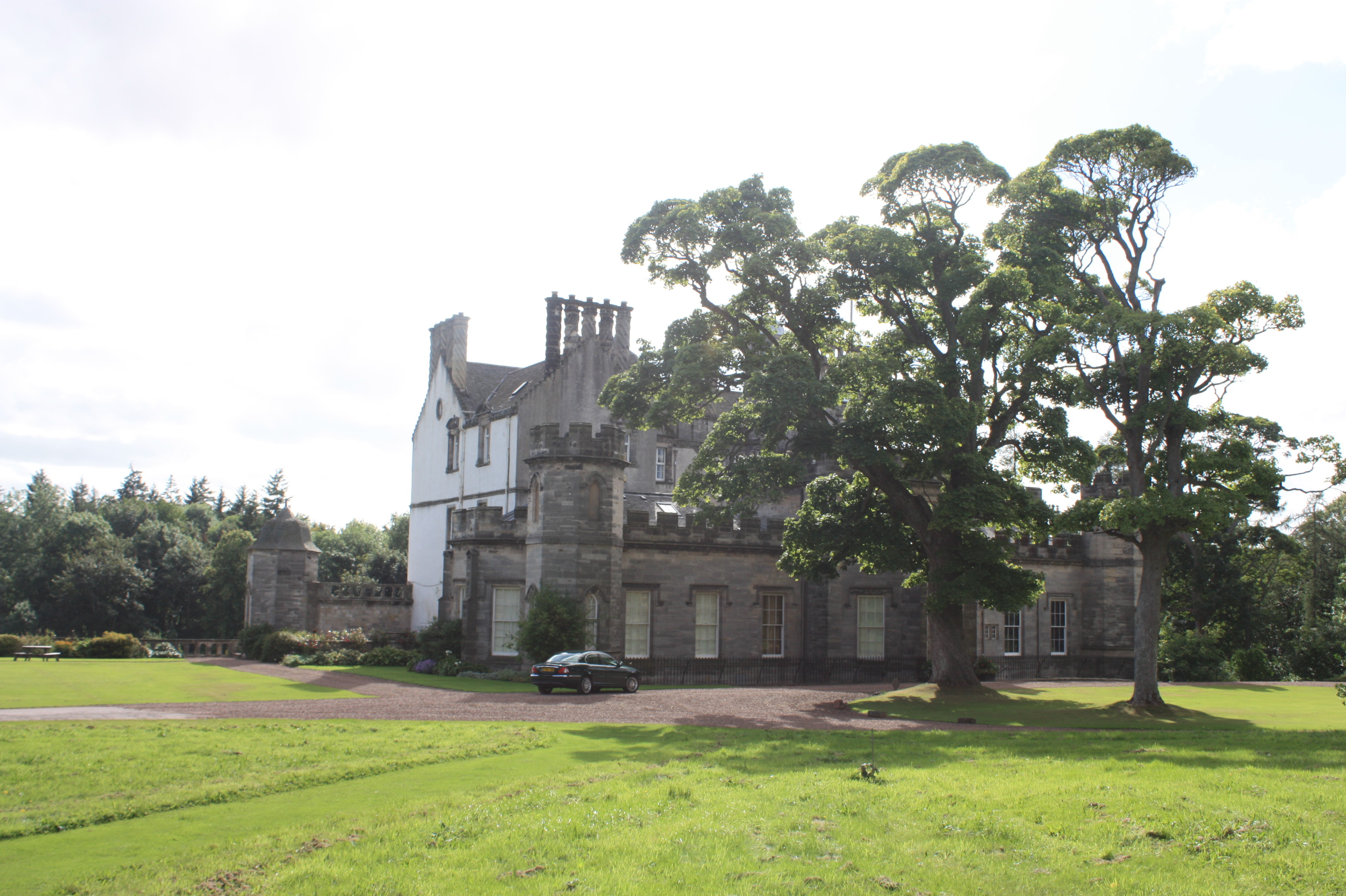
Winton Castle, Pencaitland from NE (showing original tower-house on left)

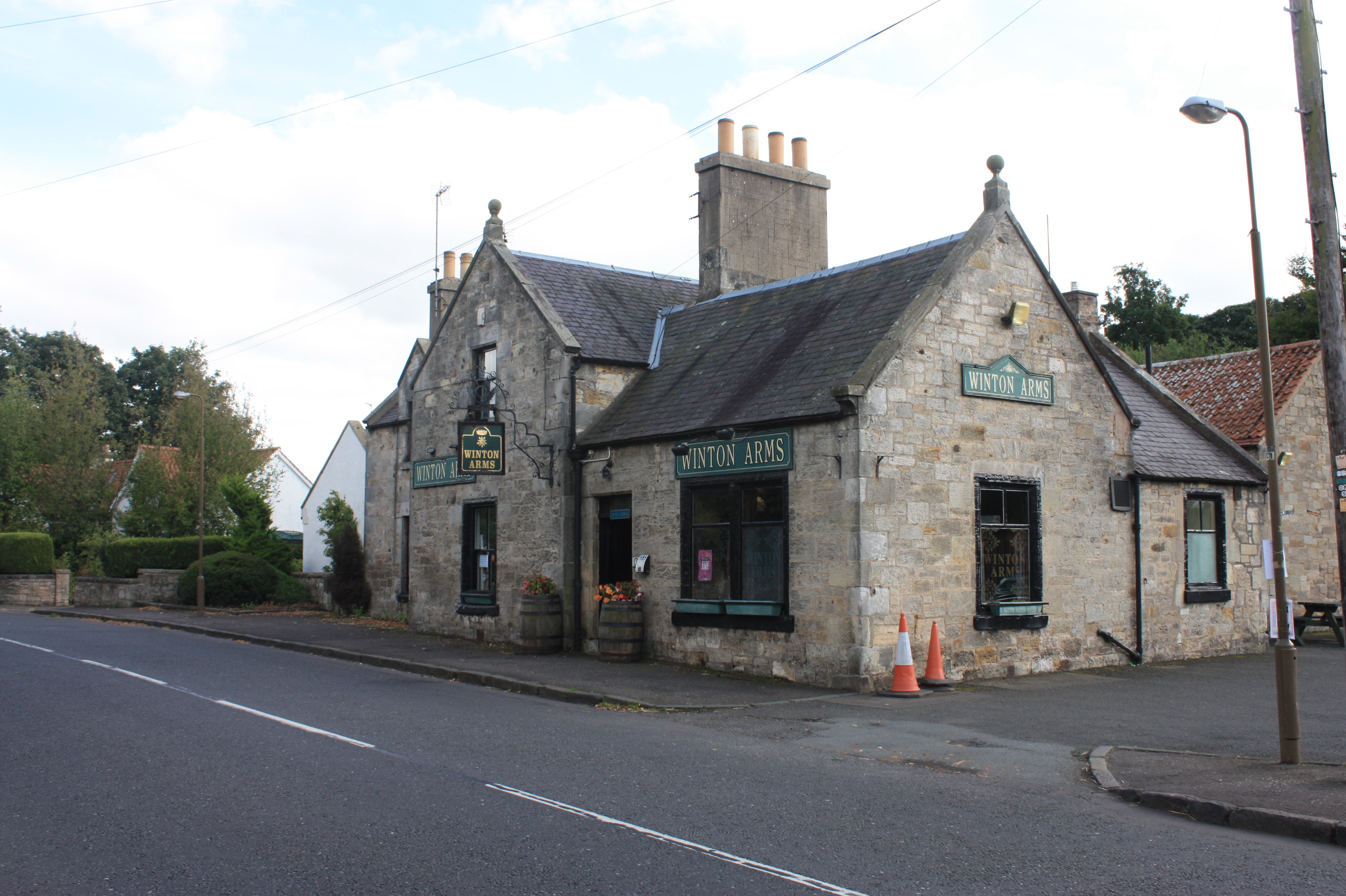
The Winton Arms, Pencaitland

1/2 mile (800 metres) northwest of Pencaitland is Winton Castle, the original square Tower house being built in the 15th century on land granted to the Setons by David I c1152, and mentioned in a charter to them from William the Lion in 1169. It was burnt by the Earl of Hertford's forces during the Rough Wooing, and subsequently repaired, restored, and later enlarged by George Seton, 3rd Earl of Winton, commencing in 1619. Architecturally, Winton is one of the most important houses in Scotland, due largely to the work of William Wallace, who was appointed the King's Master Mason in 1617.

This "peculiar and beautiful structure", is situated on a steep embankment sloping down to the valley of the Tyne. Hunnewell (The Lands of Scott) says: "this Jacobean mansion was that of Ravenswood in The Bride of Lammermoor. There is, of course, a ghost-room in the upper part of the house; but I saw nothing uncanny about it, twice that I was there."

In 1630, Lord Winton had completed half of the house, beginning at Wallace's Tower, which had been burned, and continuing as far as Jacob's Tower. Another room, called the King's Chamber, is said to have been occupied by Charles I when he came to Scotland to be crowned in 1633, although most records have him staying at Seton Palace.

Thinking that better times were now at hand, the Earl of Winton caused to be carved on a fine stone tablet upon the frontispiece of his new building a crown supported by a thistle between two roses, signifying the union of Scotland and England. Under it he caused to be inscribed in deep letters of gold this Latin verse: Unio Nune Stoque Cadoque Tuis. Mylne makes a note upon this, saying: "Ye Union was ye cause of the families' ruin".

The Wintons' tenure lasted until 1715 when George Seton, 5th Earl of Winton engaged in supporting the Jacobites. He was captured and taken to the Tower of London, and ultimately forfeited his land. The Earl's capture ended an era when kings were entertained and master craftsmen were engaged fresh from Edinburgh Castle to embellish Winton House in the style of the Scottish Renaissance. In the absence of the Earl but in his name, Winton was requisitioned by Bonnie Prince Charlie in 1745 when his rebel army camped on the Winton estate.

Winton is now the family home of Sir Francis and Lady Ogilvy.

== Fountainhall ==
3/4 mile (1.2 kilometres) south-west of Pencaitland is Fountainhall, a late 16th-century mansion extended in the early 17th century on the same intimate scale and with the same materials, fine-grained harlings matching the pale yellow sandstone of the chimneys, crowstep gables, and other dressings. The estate's original name was Woodhead, and was purchased by John Pringle in 1635 who carried out extensive alterations and enhancements. On 13 August 1681 the estate was purchased by John Lauder of Newington, a rich Baillie of Edinburgh, for whom the house and lands were erected into the feudal barony of Fountainhall, becoming the seat of that family. Tradition states that the part of the property to the east contained a courtroom for the barony.

Most of the internal finishings are the work of the Lauders from the early 18th century, with much panelling and plaster cornices. After the Lauders finally parted with Fountainhall in the 1920s, the removal of a lath-and-plaster wall revealed a tapestry in situ, dating from about 1700. There is a 17th-century walled garden adjoining the east of the house, and to the south of the house is a ruined 17th century dovecote, later imitated by the erection of another, identical, nearby. The Royal Commission on the Ancient and Historical Monuments of Scotland suggests that the two buildings flanked an 18th-century pedestrian access to the house.

Professor John (Ian) Holbourn bought Fountainhall in 1922 and renamed the house Pencait Castle. Professor Holbourn, who was a survivor of the Lusitania sinking in 1916, was the owner and laird of Foula in the Shetland Islands. The house was sold after the death of his wife, Marion, in the 1950s. In 1956, Mr. and Mrs. Ian and Trudy Cowe bought the house, returning the name to Fountainhall. In 1988, the house came into the hands of their son Robert and his wife Alison in whose possession the house remains. (2009)

== Church ==
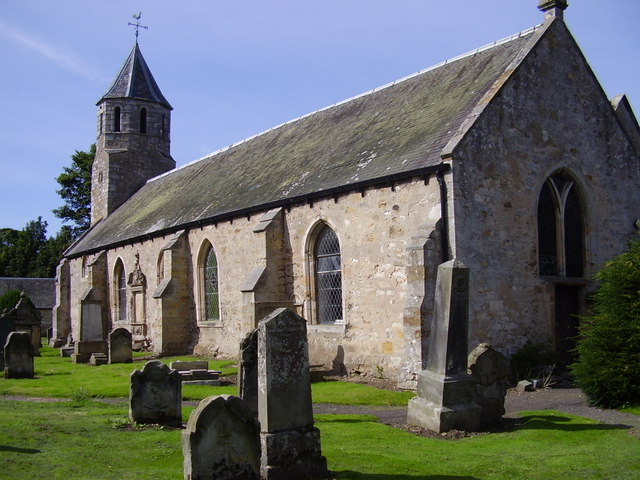
Pencaitland Parish Church

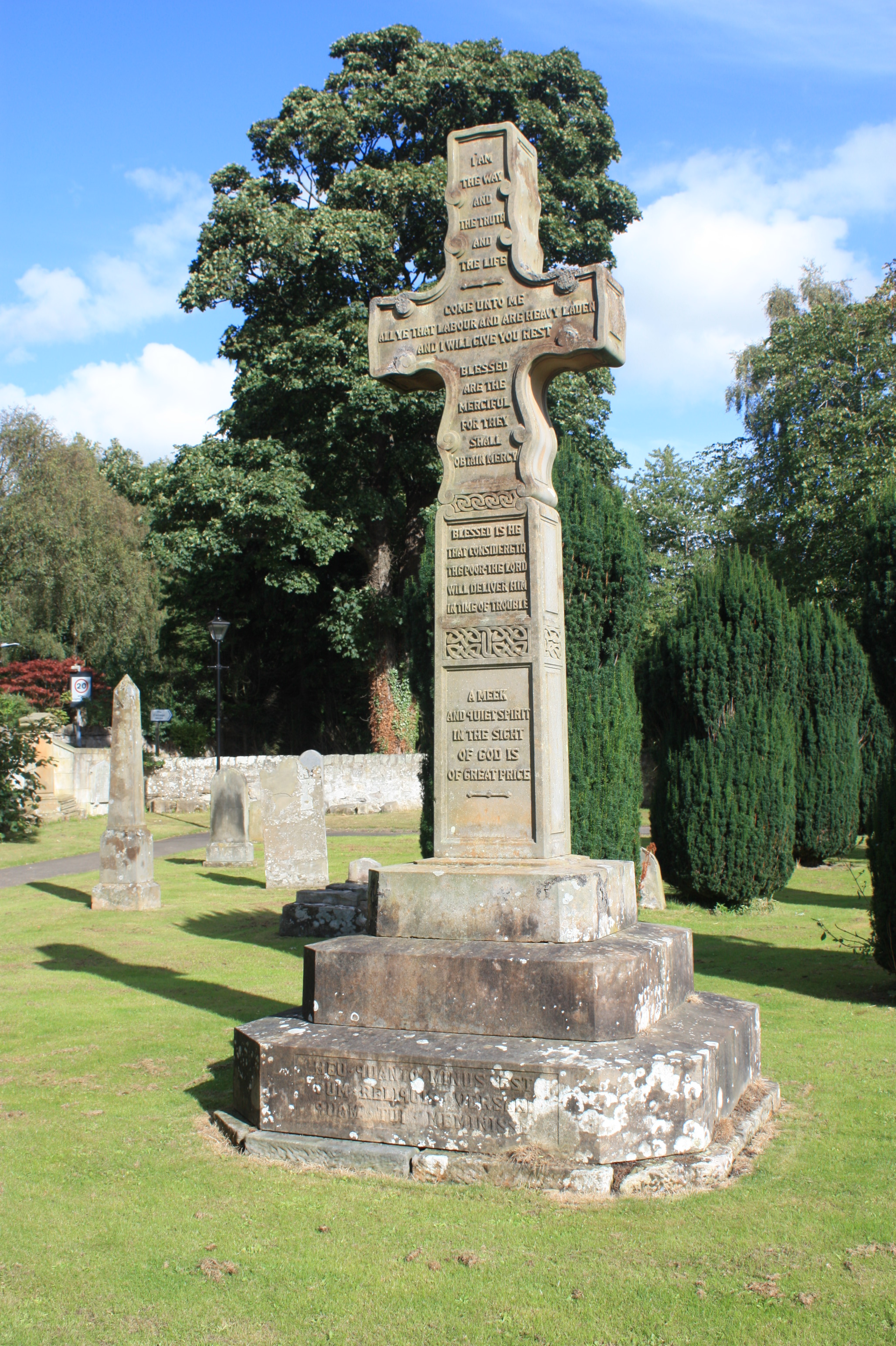
Monument to James, Lord Ruthven 1777–1853, Pencaitland

The Pencaitland parish Church of Scotland, at Easter Pencaitland, is apparently of the 16th or early 17th century, but probably standing on medieval foundations. The west tower contains the Saltoun aisle, formerly entered through a fine mid-seventeenth century door in the west wall; and there is a chapel at the northern end. Immediately east of the Saltoun aisle is a two-bay chapel, said by some to date from the 13th century. The west tower is square for most of its height, but at the top it contains an octagonal belfry and dovecote. The building has a pointed slated spire dating from 1631. Over the centuries the building has been much altered. The front row of pews in the Saltoun aisle are of Dutch character in oak, c. 1600. The organ was installed in 1889.

Former Ministers include David Calderwood (1575–1650) and Robert Douglas (1594–1674), one time leader of Scotland's moderate Presbyterians. On the west wall a Renaissance tablet to Katherine Forbes, daughter of the Rev. John Forbes, Minister to the English Merchant-Adventurers at Delft gives a year of death of 1639. She was the wife of a Pencaitland minister, John Oswald, whose initials are carved over the west door. In the churchyard is an Iona cross to James, Sixth Lord Ruthven (1777–1853).

The manse, to the south of the church, was erected in the early 19th century in a 'pretty Gothic' style with canted bays.

== District ==
The Pencaitland to Ormiston railway walk follows the course of the Edinburgh – Gifford branch railway line, originally built by the Gifford and Garvald Light Railway Company in 1901, which was closed in 1965.

Pencaitland is also the location of recording studio Castle Sound Studios, founded by producer Calum Malcolm in 1979 and sited in a building which formerly housed Pencaitland Primary School until it moved to an area known as The Glebe in the 1970s. The band Orange Juice recorded their first two singles for the Postcard Records label at Castle Sound. Simple Minds, Runrig, REM, Martyn Bennett and The Blue Nile have also recorded there.

Located a short distance from the village is Glenkinchie distillery, which produces Scotch whisky, marketed by Diageo as part of their Classic Malts range.

Tyneholm House is a Category B listed mansion house designed by William Burn in 1835 for Patrick Dudgeon. The house was later a seat of a branch of the Trevelyan family. It became a Dr Barnardo's Children's Home in the mid-twentieth century and in the 1980s a nursing home. Now in use again as a private home.

The Trevelyan Hall in Wester Pencaitland was erected in 1883 by Mrs. Trevelyan of Tyneholm at a cost of over £1200, in memory of her husband, Arthur Trevelyan, who died in 1880, 2nd son of Sir John Trevelyan of Wallington Hall in Northumberland. It is classified by Historic Environment Scotland as a category C listed building. The only public house in the village is called "The Winton Arms". It is currently closed for refurbishment and transformation into a pub/restaurant.

Pencaitland receives a mention in Shaun Keaveny's book "R2D2 Lives in Preston" (2010).

== Transport ==
The nearest railway station is in Longniddry. There is a half-hourly ScotRail service to and from North Berwick and Edinburgh Waverley.

East Coast Buses is the main bus operator in the village. Service 113 provides a half hourly service into Edinburgh city centre via the nearby towns of Tranent and Musselburgh, seven days a week. Pencaitland lies in Fare Zone C along with Ormiston which is also served by service 113.

The Gifford Circle route (123) run by Eve Coaches also connects Pencaitland with Haddington and other villages in East Lothian.

== Famous Residents ==
- Euan Burton, judoka and 2012 Olympics contender, was educated at Pencaitland Primary School.
- The Lauder Baronets of Fountainhall.
- Sir Andrew Lauder, 5th Baronet of Fountainhall.
- Jock Taylor (1954–1982), British World Champion motorcycle sidecar racer.
- Very Rev Angus Makellar DD, minister of Pencaitland and Moderator of the General Assembly of the Church of Scotland in 1840 during his term as minister. He was also Moderator of the General Assembly of the Free Church of Scotland in 1852 having left the established church in the Disruption of 1843.
- Rev Robert Douglas, minister of the parish 1669 to 1674
