= Robert Seton, 2nd Earl of Winton =

Scottish peer

Robert Seton, 2nd Earl of Winton and 9th Lord Seton (c. 1583 – January 1634) was a Scottish Peer.

He succeeded his father Robert Seton, 1st Earl of Winton in March, 1603. A devoted Catholic and supporter of the Stuarts all of his life, he began rebuilding the Seton Palace, which his brother the 3rd Earl continued and completed.

Robert, 2nd Earl of Winton was, however, unbalanced, and went mad on his wedding night, emptying a chamber pot down his bride's cleavage, and was accordingly kept shut away at Seton, where he diligently worked away on his building project and the management of the family estates, until his death.

His unfortunate thirteen year old bride was Anne Maitland, a daughter of John Maitland of Thirlestane and Jean Fleming. She died in 1609.

Because of his incapacity he was prevailed upon to resign the Earldom in favour of his younger brother George Seton, 3rd Earl of Winton on 26 June 1606, although this was not put into effect until 12 May 1607. It has been said that his brother George's motivation for restoring and rebuilding Winton House, was to ensure that his older brother Robert would be suitably and honorably cared for during the remainder of his life after presenting him with the family honours and estates at such an opportune age in life.

Robert, however, continued to manage the family coalmines. During a period when the king and Privy Council of Scotland attempted to limit exports and prevent proprietors raising prices, on 12 June 1622 James VI and I wrote to Robert from Whitehall, allowing him to export his coal as he wished.

Lord Winton married, on 1 February 1603, Anna (d. 6 July 1609), only daughter of John Maitland, 2nd Lord Maitland of Thirlestane and Jean Fleming. As part of the marriage contract Fleming paid for rebuilding work at Winton Castle. Anna Maitland subsequently petitioned for divorce on the grounds of her husband's impotence.

Peerage of Scotland
Preceded by Robert Seton	Earl of Winton; 1603–1617	Succeeded by George Seton
