= George Seton, 5th Lord Seton =

Scottish nobleman

George Seton III, 5th Lord Seton (died 9 September 1513) was a Scottish nobleman. He is sometimes referred to as the 3rd Lord Seton because he was the 3rd Lord Seton with the name of George.

He succeeded his father, the 4th Lord, on his death in 1508. During his brief tenure he carried out works at Seton Palace, the family seat in East Lothian, and made further donations to Seton Collegiate Church, which had been established by his ancestors.

Lord Seton was a companion of King James IV of Scotland, and went with him on the expedition into England in 1513. This campaign ended at the disastrous Battle of Flodden, where on 9 September, King James and Lord Seton were among the thousands of Scots who were killed. Lord Seton's body was returned to Scotland and interred at Seton Church beside that of his father.

== Janet Hepburn ==
Before January 1507, George Seton married Lady Janet Hepburn, daughter of Patrick Hepburn, 1st Earl of Bothwell and Janet 'Joanna' Douglas, Countess of Bothwell daughter of Princess Joan Stewat and James Douglas. They had one surviving son, who later succeeded as George Seton, 6th Lord Seton, and a daughter, Mariota (or Marion), who married, firstly Thomas, Master of Borthwick, secondly in 1530 she married Hugh Montgomerie, 2nd Earl of Eglinton, and thirdly, Alexander Graham of Wallacetown.

After Flodden, Lady Seton lived as a widow for another forty-five years. A pious lady, she continued to make gifts to Seton Church, and had new extensions built. When her son, the young Lord Seton, came of age, she retired to the Convent of Saint Catherine of Siena, at Edinburgh. This convent, founded 1517 by a bull of Pope Leo X, also benefited from Lady Seton's donations. She died there in 1558 and was buried next to her husband at Seton.

Peerage of Scotland
Preceded by George Seton	Lord Seton; 1507–1513	Succeeded by George Seton
