= Earl of Winton =

Earldom in the Peerage of the United Kingdom

The title Earl of Winton was created in the Peerage of Scotland and later in the Peerage of the United Kingdom. It is currently held by the Earl of Eglinton.

The title was first bestowed upon Robert Seton, 8th Lord Seton. His descendants held it until George Seton, 5th Earl of Winton, was convicted of high treason in 1716, resulting in the forfeiture of his titles. Lord Winton was also condemned to death, but he managed to escape the Tower of London and fled to Rome, where he later died. The family resided at Winton Castle.

In 1834, there were two claimants: the Earl of Eglinton and George Seton as a descendant of Sir George Seton of Garleton, East Lothian.

The title had a second creation for the thirteenth Earl of Eglinton, a kinsman of the last Earl from the first creation.

The Lords Seton were the Premier Lords of Parliament of Scotland until the creation of the Earldom of Winton in 1600. Sir Richard Maitland of Lethington wrote in his History of the House of Seytoune to the Year 1559 that Sir William Seton,

... was the 'First creatit and made Lord of Parliament in Scotland, and he and his posteritie to have ane voit yairin and be callit Lords' by King Robert II, where there were no Lords of Parliament before that time. Noted accordingly in the records of the Scottish parliament, held at Scone 26 March 1371, at the coronation of Robert II, William de Seton is named among the "Nobiles Barones", as 'Dominus de Seton'. As Knight-Barons, the Setons had previously sat in the original parliaments of Scotland from the earliest times, including those of David I, King Balliol, Robert I and David II. Anderson states George Seton accompanied Chancellor Crichton to France & Burgundy in 1448 and 'was soon afterwards created a peer of parliament'," which referred to the young Seton having finally come of age and being given his family's seat held by his grandfather, and not of the creation.

The Complete Peerage cites a jury on which "Sir George de Seton of that Ilk" served on 22 March 1451 (1450/1) and states that "he was created, shortly after that date, a Lord of Parliament as Lord Seton [S]".

== Ancestors ==
=== Paternal ancestors of the 1st Lord Seton ===
The following is a list of the paternal ancestors of the Lords Seton, noting that the surname was originally Seton before changing to Wintoun, and then reverting to Seton with the 1st Lord Seton.

- Walter "Dougall" de Seton (b.c 1060, Scotland)
- Alexander de Seton (b.c.1087)
- Philip de Seton (b.c.1135)
- Alexander II Setoun de Wintoun, Knight (b.1164)
- Alan Lord Wintoun of Soltre (d.c.1214)
- 3rd Lord Winton (c.1200)
- A Winton (c.1250)
- Alan Winton (b.1274)
- Alan de Wyntoun of Seton (b.1291) (married Margaret de Seton)

=== Maternal ancestors of the 1st Lord Seton ===
- Walter "Dougall" de Seton (b.c 1060, Scotland)
- Alexander de Seton (b.c.1087)
- Philip de Seton (b.c. 1135)
- Alexander II Setoun de Wintoun, Knight (b.1164)
- Adam de Seton (b.c. 1190 and d. 1249)
- Christopher de Seton (d.1269)
- Christopher de Seton (d.1298)
- Christopher de Seton, Knight (b.1240 and d.1307)
- Alexander de Seton, Knight (b.c. 1242 and d. 1307)
- Sir Alexander IV Seton, Knight (b.c. 1266 and d. 1350)
- Margaret de Seton (b.c. 1325) (married Alan de Wyntoun)

== Lords Seton (1371) ==
- Sir William Seton, 1st Lord Seton (d. c. 1410), created 1st Lord Seton in 1371. (son of Alan de Wyntoun and Margaret de Seton).
- Sir John Seton, 2nd Lord Seton (c. 1441)
  - William Seton, Master of Seton (k. 1424 Battle of Verneuil)
- George Seton, 3rd Lord Seton (d. 1478/9), succeeded his grandfather the 2nd Lord, while a minor, became 3rd Lord Seton in 1448.
  - John Seton, Master of Seton (d. 1476)
- George Seton, 4th Lord Seton (d. 1507/8), succeeded his grandfather, the 3rd Lord.
- George Seton, 5th Lord Seton (d. 1513), killed at Flodden.
- George Seton, 6th Lord Seton (d. 1549)
- George Seton, 7th Lord Seton (d. 1586)
- Robert Seton, 8th Lord Seton (d. 1603) (created Earl of Winton in 1600)

== Earls of Winton, First Creation (1600) ==
- Robert Seton, 1st Earl of Winton (1553–1603)
- Robert Seton, 2nd Earl of Winton (c. 1583–1634), resigned the titles to his brother before 1617 during his own lifetime
- George Seton, 3rd Earl of Winton (1584–1650)
  - George Seton, Lord Seton, Master of Winton (1613–1648)
- George Seton, 4th Earl of Winton (1642–1704)
- George Seton, 5th Earl of Winton (d. 1749) (forfeit 1716)

== Earls of Winton, Second Creation (1859) ==
See Earl of Eglinton
