= Seton Palace =

Castle in East Lothian, Scotland

Coordinates: 55.96527°N 2.9335°W

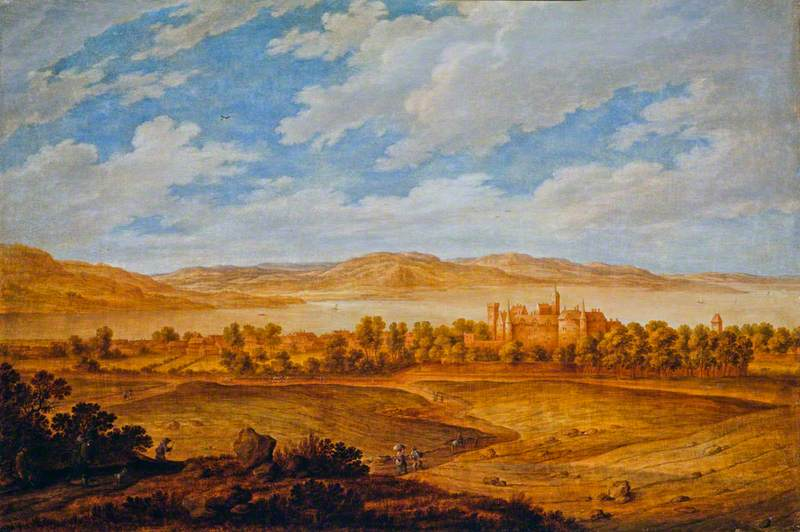
Seton Palace in 1638 by Alexander Keirincx, National Galleries of Scotland

Seton Palace was situated in East Lothian, a few miles south-east of Edinburgh near the town of Prestonpans. Often regarded as the most desirable Scottish residence of the sixteenth and seventeenth centuries, the palace was erected in the 15th century by George, 4th Lord Seton.

The palace belonged to the Lords Seton by the 1500s and was a popular retreat for Mary, Queen of Scots. She had spent her honeymoon with Lord Darnley there in July 1565. Mary played golf at Seton, and it was said she played "pall-mall and golf" as usual in the fields at Seton after Darnley's murder, "Pall-mall" was an early form of croquet. A marriage contract of Mary and Earl of Bothwell, made at Seton on 5 April 1567, and exhibited by Mary's enemies at the Hampton Court conference on 15 December 1568, was probably a contemporary forgery and the actual contract was made in Edinburgh on 14 May.

In the 17th-century, the completed palace was triangular in plan, with three wings around a courtyard. In 1636, it was described as "a dainty seat placed by sea". The palace ruins were demolished in the 18th-century and Seton Castle was built on the site. The adjacent Seton family chapel, Seton Collegiate Church, survives and is open to the public in the care of Historic Environment Scotland.

== History ==
The date when the original palace was built is uncertain but it was located on the lands of Seton and Winton. Richard Maitland's History of the House of Seytoun mentions some aspects of the building. He wrote that George Seton, 5th Lord Seton (d. 1513), completed the "jemmay house", a wing which his grandfather, John, Master of Seton (d. 1476) had begun. His widow, Janet Hepburn, Lady Seton built the fore-work or gatehouse. The palace was burnt by an English army on 16 May 1544 after the burning of Edinburgh. The English commander Lord Hertford wrote that while he was burning the palace, Lord Seton was nearby with some horsemen, "so that he might well see his own house and town on fire." Lord Seton was married to a French lady-in-waiting Marie Pieris, their daughter Mary Seton was a companion of Mary, Queen of Scots.

As the war with England known as the Rough Wooing continued, Regent Arran came to Seton in March 1549 because the English were at Haddington. Some whales beached at Cramond Island and were salted and packed in barrels and sent to Seton for him.

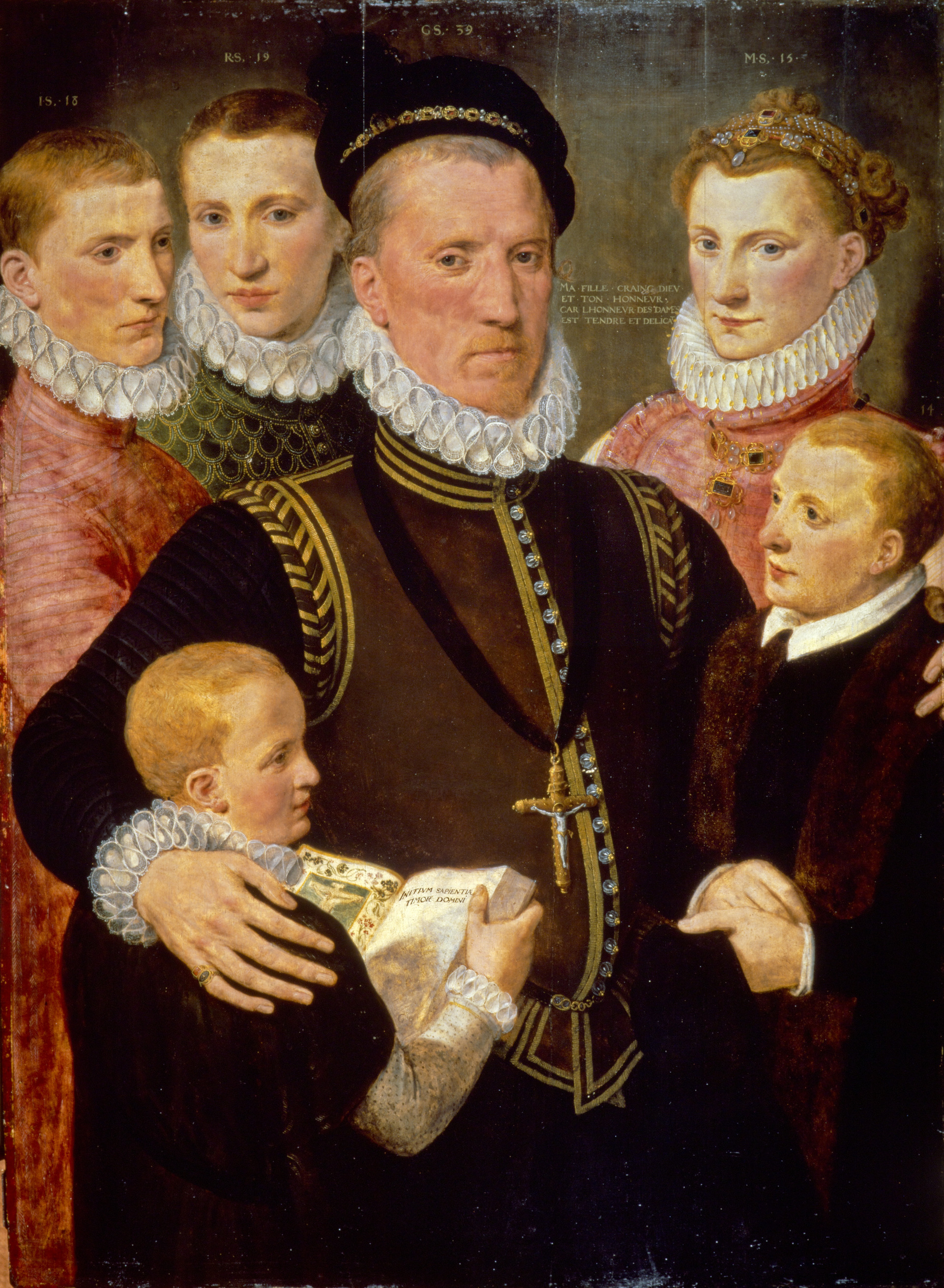
George Seton, 7th Lord Seton, and his children in 1572, including Margaret, Lady Paisley, Robert, Earl of Winton, Sir John Seton of Barns and Alexander, Earl of Dunfermline

The great tower and the "jemmay house" were subsequently restored by Sir William Hamilton of Sanquhar, Captain of Edinburgh Castle and father-in-law of George Seton, 7th Lord Seton. The walled garden was also built at this time. Mary of Guise stayed at Seton Palace for Christmas 1559. The old great tower collapsed in 1561, the structure comprised by new windows. Janet Hepburn's gatehouse was then almost entirely rebuilt.

In October 1561 the uncle of Mary, Queen of Scots, Francis the Grand Prior, travelled to England and Mary's four companions Mary Seton, Mary Beaton, Mary Livingston, and Mary Fleming came with him to Seton and they all had dinner. Mary, Queen of Scots, stayed in bed at Holyrood Palace. She became a frequent visitor, and in January 1562 New Year's Day was celebrated with a poem by Alexander Scott filled with "advice for princes" for just rule in Scotland, Ane New Yeir Gift to Quene Mary. In July 1565, Mary rode to Seton from Edinburgh at night and stayed two days. She came to Seton after the death of Lord Darnley in February 1567. Articles drawn up against her mention golf, and allege that she slept with Bothwell, who was lodged in an "obscure chamber" beneath her room, a room near the kitchen with access to a secret turnpike stair. William Drury reported that the gates were "straightly kept" while Mary was at Seton in February. He heard she had made an excursion to Tranent, and then competed in an archery match at Waughton Castle. Later, however, he wrote she had not stirred from Seton Palace.

In 1584, Lupold von Wedel admired the tall hedges of the garden but could not get in. The Master of Work, William Schaw, is said to have been involved in building work at Seton in 1584. James VI stayed at Seton Palace in September 1589 waiting in vain for Anne of Denmark to arrive in Scotland. The English ambassador Lord Burgh was welcomed with a banquet on 24 February 1593. James VI made a hunting trip to the Merse area in February 1595, planning to visit Dunglass, Spott, Beil, Waughton, and Seton.

On 31 May 1597 Anne of Denmark travelled to Seton in a litter, despite the rain, while James VI went to Falkland Palace. Lord Walden came to Seton Palace to see Anna Hay, Countess of Winton, and her children in 1613. King James stayed at Seton again on 15 May 1617, and during the celebrations to welcome the returning king, William Drummond of Hawthornden, presented his poem Forth Feasting, and John Gellie of Gellistoun delivered 300 lines of Latin verse.

Historical records indicate that it was the most magnificent palace in Scotland in the 17th century. Alexander Nisbet described some details of the interior. Above the fireplace in the Great Hall were the Seton heraldry quartered with the Earl of Buchan encircled with a collar which Nisbet claimed to represent the Order of the Thistle. The ceiling of another room, called "Samson's Hall" incorporated 28 armorial achievements of families of France, Scotland and Lorraine, "curiously embossed and illuminated." Viscount Kingston mentions seeing a mural painting on the end wall of the Long Gallery which he believed showed the 7th Lord Seton driving a wagon during his years of exile in France following the abdication of Mary, Queen of Scots.

The family built another house further inland, Winton Castle, on an old site around 1630, and architectural details there resemble the fragments of dormers windows and carved strapwork remaining from Seton Palace and now displayed at the adjacent Seton Collegiate Church.

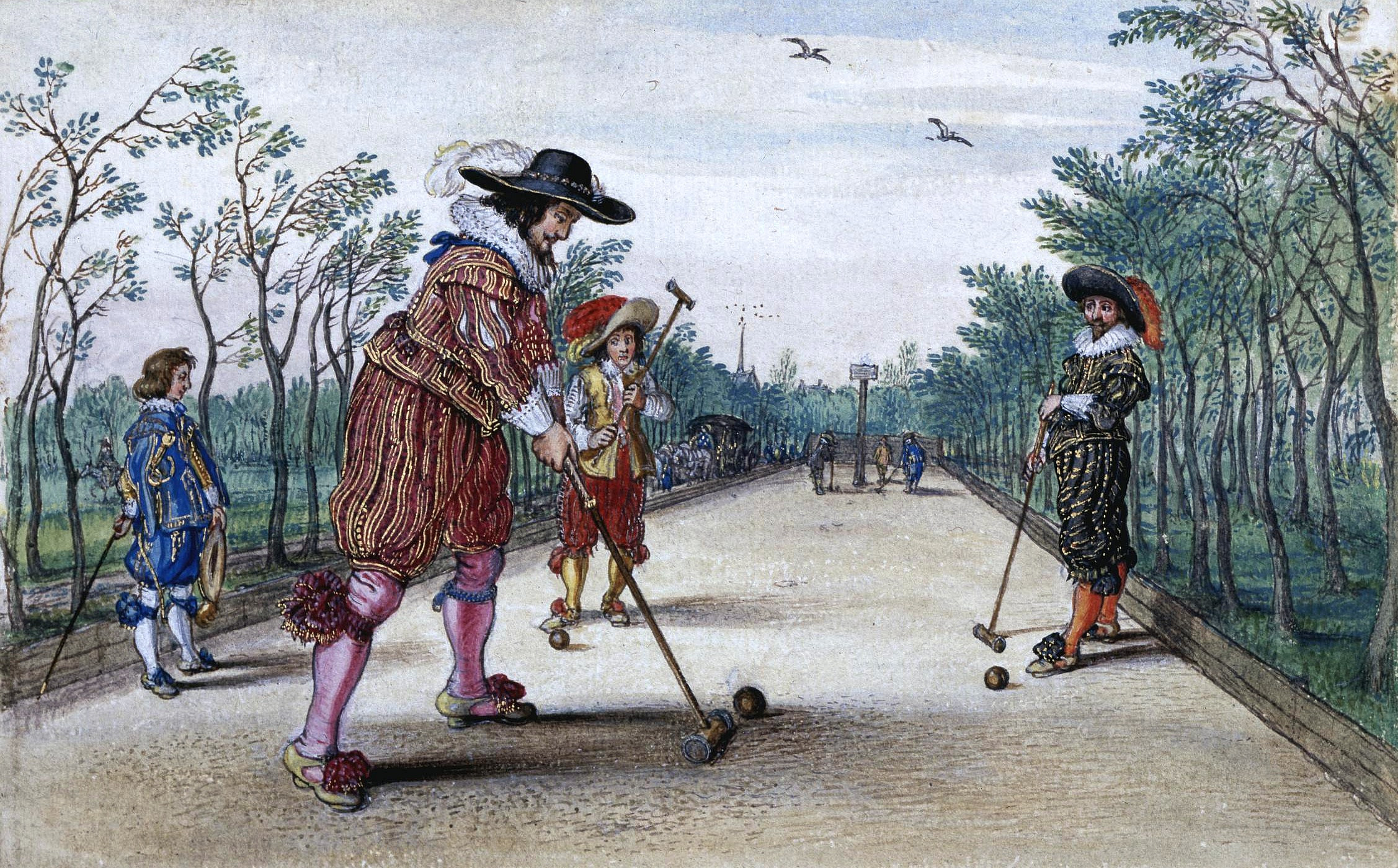
Drawing of a game of pall-mall between Frederick V of the Palatinate and Frederick Henry, Prince of Orange, by Adriaen van de Venne, circa 1625

King Charles I commissioned a view of the palace from Alexander Keirincx in 1638. There would have been a lawn or court for pall-mall, as played by Mary, Queen of Scots, in 1567. James VI recommended the game for his son Prince Henry in his Basilikon Doron.

Produce from the gardens included strawberries in July. Despite the sea air, the gardens were stocked with sycamores, walnut trees, apple and other fruit trees. It is said that one of the sixteenth-century gardeners had a son who became a pirate. He came back and gave the Earl of Winton a rare sea shell, a turbo pica from the West Indies. The earl had it made into a snuff box with a silver lid by George Heriot. It descended from David Seton of Parbroath to the family of the author Robert Seton in New York.

== Ruin and replacement ==
The Seton family, who had acquired the title "Earl of Winton" had their estates confiscated after the Jacobite rising of 1715. The palace was burned out during the Rising and in 1780, it was described as being in ruins. The palace was demolished in 1789.

In 1789 the owner of the site, Lt Col Alexander Mackenzie of the 21st Dragoons, commissioned Robert Adam to build a mansion that would become Seton Castle. Some of the stone from the palace was used in the construction.

Some of the walls of the famous formal gardens of the 16th and 17th century remain, with rounds or lookout turrets at the corners.
