= George Seton, 3rd Earl of Winton =

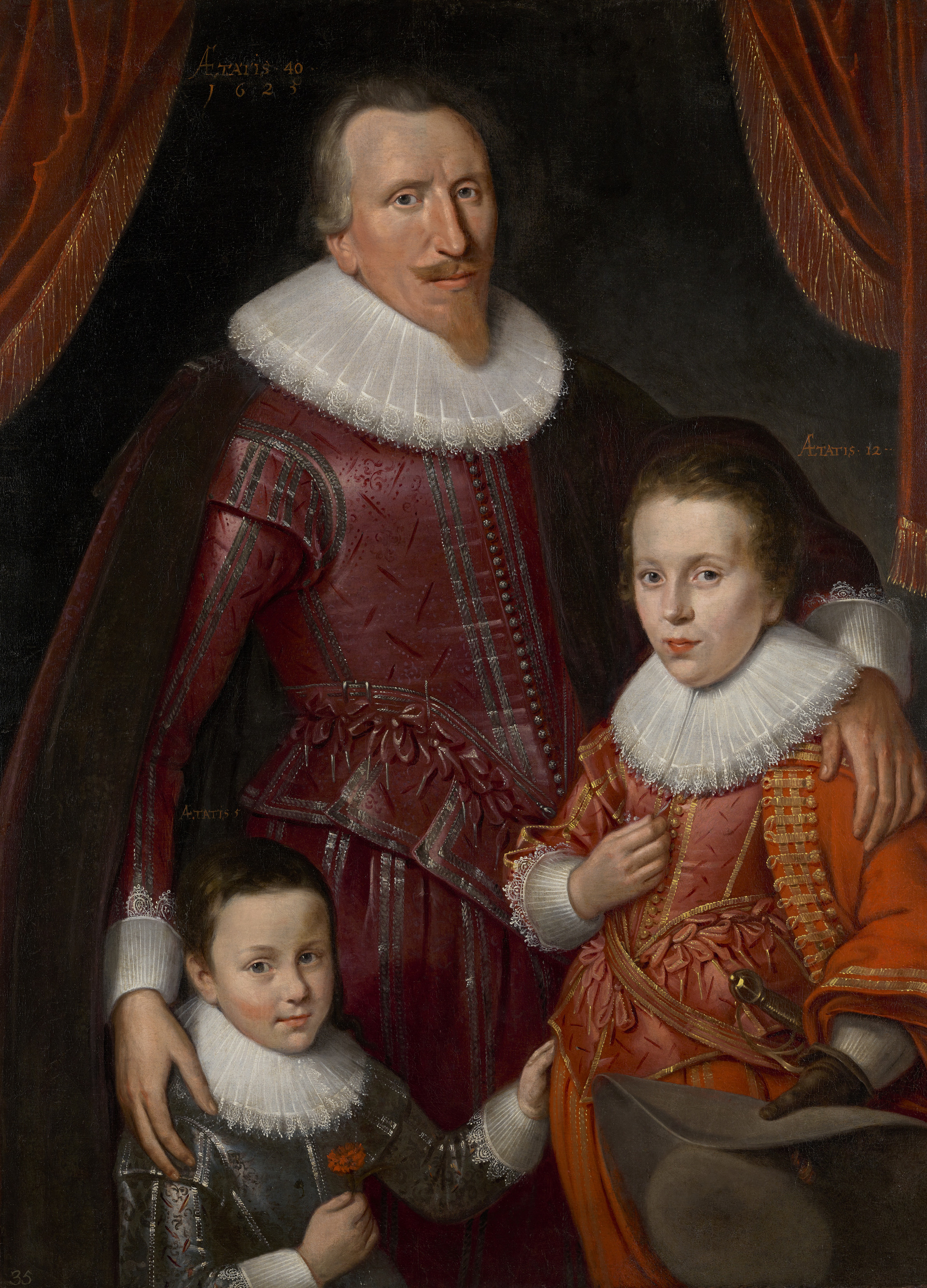
The 3rd Earl with his sons George and Alexander

George Seton, 3rd Earl of Winton (December 1584 – 17 December 1650) was a notable Royalist and Cavalier, the second son of Robert Seton, 1st Earl of Winton and 6th Lord Seton, by his spouse Margaret, daughter of Hugh Montgomerie, 3rd Earl of Eglinton.

== Biography ==
Seton was known, before his older brother's illness as "George Seton of St Germans". His Catholic tutor Stephen Ballantyne was criticised by the Presbytery of Tranent and the elders of Haddington forced his removal. Two more Catholic tutors were dismissed after pressure from the Kirk. The Seton brothers, like many other Scottish aristocrats, completed their education in France.

His elder brother Robert Seton, 2nd Earl of Winton, had no issue, and resigned the Earldom on 26 June 1606, to George, who continued the developments that his brother and father had begun at Seton Palace, and later, in 1630, at Port Seton, as well as throughout the many estates under his control in both that county and Linlithgowshire.

In 1619 he built the mansion house of Winton near Pencaitland, the earlier tower house having been burned in the English invasion of the Earl of Hertford, and restored the park, orchard, and gardens around it. In his 1622 will, the Earl of Dunfermline directed the Earl of Winton and his brother Sir William Seton to complete his building work at Pinkie House.

When King James VI of Scotland revisited Scotland in 1617, he spent his second night, after crossing the River Tweed, at Seton Palace, and King Charles I was twice entertained there, with all his retinue, in 1633.

== War of the Three Kingdoms ==
In 1639, at the commencement of the Scottish rebellion against the Crown, Lord Winton left the country and waited upon King Charles I after the pacification of Berwick to offer his loyal services, for which the rebels did him great injury; and thereafter all through the Civil Wars he was constantly harassed:

"Cromwell and his army of cavalry domineered in all parts where they came, and in especial about Edinburgh, and in East Lothian. The good Earl of Winton, to whose well-furnished table all the noblemen and gentlemen had ever been welcome, was pitifully abused by them; his fair house of Seaton made a common inn; himself threatened to be killed, if they had not whatsoever they called for; his rich furniture and stuff plundered, and all the enormities that could be offered by Jews or Turks to Christians, he suffered daily; and when he complained to those of our nobility who now rule all, he got no redress, but [was] ordered with patience to give them whatsoever they called for."

When James Graham, 1st Marquess of Montrose was in command of the Royal forces in 1645, the Earl's eldest son, George, Lord Seton, joined him, and was taken prisoner at the disastrous battle of Philiphaugh and remained long "in hazard of his life". George, Lord Seton died before his father, in 1648.

George, Earl of Winton, entered into the 'Engagement' for the rescue of His Majesty in 1648, giving £1000 sterling to the Duke of Hamilton, the commander-in-chief, in free gift for his equipage.

Like his father, the Earl suffered a long series of petty persecutions from the Presbytery of Haddington because of his allegiance to the Roman Catholic faith. For instance, on 4 November 1648, the Presbytery ordained "a purge the House of Setoun of 'Popish servants', and to proceed both against them and against the Earl of Wintoun if he protect or resset them after admonition."

When King Charles II came to Scotland in June 1650, the Earl of Winton was in continuous attendance on him, and continued with His Majesty until November. He then went home to Seton to prepare for his attendance at the Coronation, but died on 17 December of that year.

== Family ==
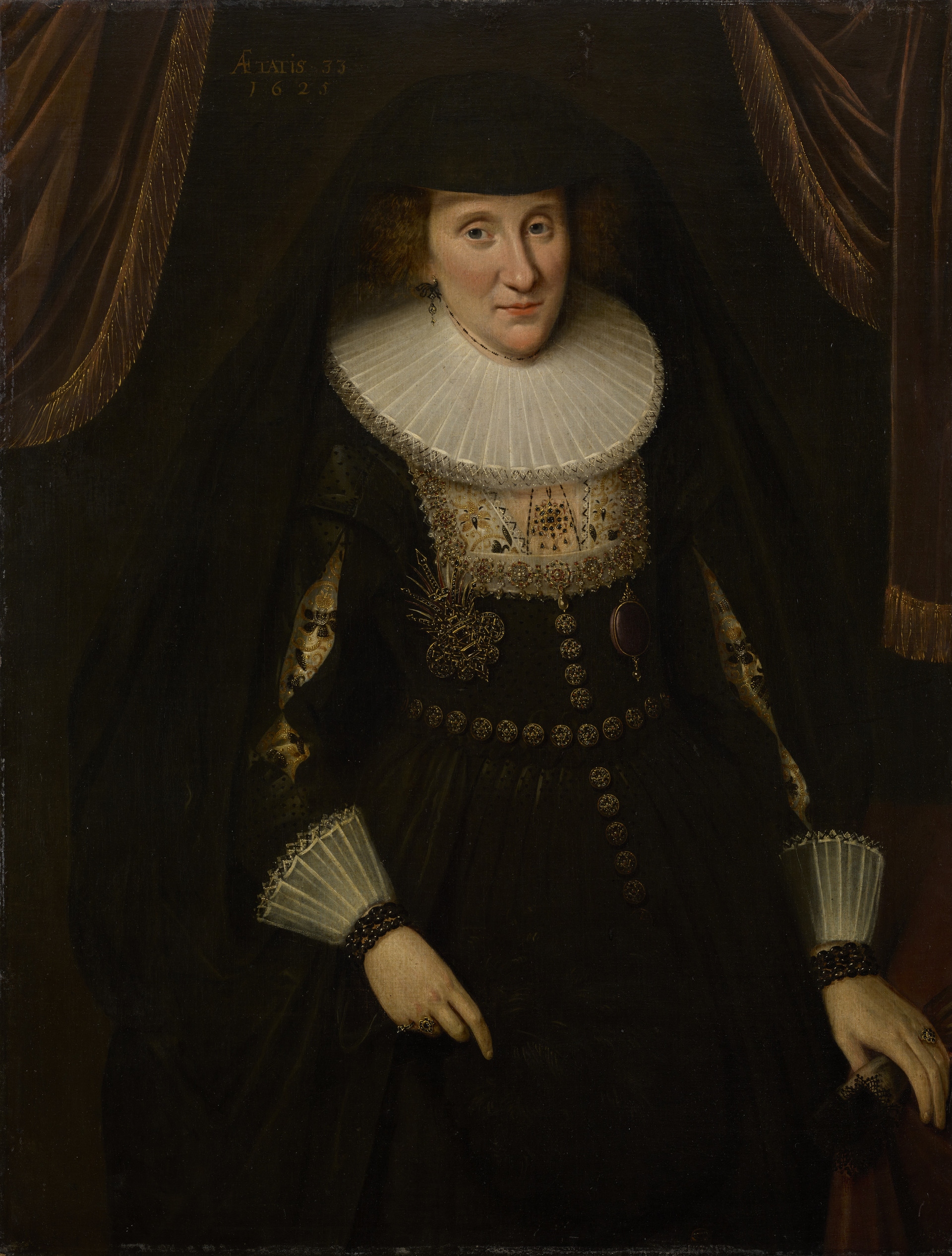
His first wife, Lady Ann Hay

Lord Winton was twice married. He married in 1609, Anna Hay, eldest daughter of Francis Hay, 9th Earl of Erroll and Elizabeth Douglas, daughter of the Earl of Morton. She was a lady in waiting in Anne of Denmark. They had five sons and three daughters, of whom:

- George, Lord Seton (d.1648)
- Alexander Seton, 1st Viscount of Kingston
- Elizabeth (1621–1650), married in 1637 William Keith, 7th Earl Marischal.

By his second wife, Elizabeth, only daughter of John Maxwell, 6th Lord Herries of Terregles, Lord Winton had six sons and six daughters, of whom:

- William
- Christopher, regarded as a great scholar. These two brothers and a preceptor, while going "on their travels abroad, were cast away at sea upon the coasts of Holland in 1648".
- John Seton of Garleton
- Robert Seton (died 1673), educated at the Scots College in Douai.
- Ann, married at Winton House in April 1654, to John Stuart, 2nd Earl of Traquair, by whom she had three sons and one daughter, Elizabeth, who died "a brave hopeful young lady", at twenty years of age. It is said that when Lord Traquair married Lady Anne Seton, the Covenanters made him stand at the kirk door of Dalkeith in a sack, for marrying a papist.
- Mary, married James Dalzell, 3rd Earl of Carnwath, by whom she had a daughter, also named Mary, who married Lord John Hay, second son of the Marquess of Tweeddale, a brigadier-general under the Duke of Marlborough.

Peerage of Scotland
Preceded by Robert Seton	Earl of Winton; 1617–1650	Succeeded by George Seton
