= George Seton, 5th Earl of Winton =

Scottish nobleman

George Seton, 5th Earl of Winton (c. 1678–1749) was a Scottish nobleman who took part in the Jacobite rising of 1715 supporting "The Old Pretender" James Stuart. Captured by the English, Seton was tried and sentenced to death, but escaped and lived the rest of his life in exile.

== Early life ==
Seton was originally brought up to assume his rightful place as head and heir of line of the Seton Family. To this end, his father bestowed upon him the Barony and Lordship of Seton at a very early age, and provided for him well, so that he would be educated at the best schools in Europe. Unfortunately he was not disposed to entertaining, as the many generations of the family had been, nor did he express an interest in the political affairs of his country until later in his life which caused his father great distress and grief and for which created a rift in the family. With this, George left to travel Europe and into a life of somewhat obscurity. For a time, he worked as a blacksmith's apprentice in Flanders, though he maintained contact with the doings of the family through a confidential servant in the Seton household back in Scotland.

He was abroad on his travels when his parents died, and "no man knew where to find him, till accident led to the discovery." Macky's memoirs say that he "was at Rome when his father died.": and did not return to Scotland until several years after his succession to the earldom, much to the detriment of his house and estate, which were dilapidated by sundry kinsmen during this protracted absence. He seems, like all his family, to have been given study and researches of some kind, and to travel; and in 1708 Robert Calder, a minister of the Episcopal Church of Scotland, dedicated to him his edition of the Genuine Epistles of the St. Ignatius.

== 1715 rebellion ==
He was one of the first Scottish noblemen who played an active part in the "Rising" of 1715, to restore the exiled family to the throne. "He took with him three hundred men to the standard of James Stuart; but he appears to have carried with him a fiery and determined temper, the accompaniment, perhaps, of noble qualities, but a dangerous attribute in times of difficulty."

The Seton family, as we have seen, had always been noted for their loyalty and their attachment to the old Church, and the last Earl, though he had renounced the Catholic faith, held firmly to the political creed of his ancestors. He was living peaceably in his own mansion at Seton when the rebellion of 1715 broke out. His involvement in the rebellion was hastened by the treatment which he received from a body of the Lothian militia, who forcibly entered and rifled his mansion at Seton, as he alleged on his trial, 'through private pique and revenge.' 'The most sacred places,' he adds, 'did not escape their fury and resentment. They broke into his chapel, defaced the monuments of his ancestors, took up the stones of their sepulchres, thrust irons through their bodies, and treated them in a most barbarous, inhuman, and unchristian like manner.' After this event the Earl took up arms against the Government, assumed the command of a troop of horse mostly composed of gentlemen belonging to East Lothian, and joined the Northumbrian insurgents under Mr. Forster and the Earl of Derwentwater. Their numbers were subsequently augmented by a body of Highlanders under Brigadier Macintosh, who formed a junction with them at Kelso.

The English insurgents insisted on carrying the war into England, where they expected to be reinforced by the Jacobites and Roman Catholics in the northern and western counties. The Scotsmen proposed that they should take possession of Dumfries, Ayr, Glasgow, and other towns in the south and west of Scotland, and attack the Duke of Argyll, who lay at Stirling, in the flank and rear, while the Earl of Mar assailed his army in front. The English portion of the insurgent forces, however, persisted in carrying out their scheme in spite of the strenuous opposition of the Scots, and especially of the Highlanders, who broke out in a mutiny against the English officers. The Earl of Winton disapproved so strongly of this plan that he left the army with a considerable part of his troop, and was marching northward when he was overtaken by a messenger from the insurgent council, who entreated him to return. He replied that 'It shall never be said to after generations that the Earl of Winton deserted King James's interests or his country's good.' Then, laying hold of his own ears, he added, 'You, or any man, shall have liberty to cut these out of my head if we do not all repent it.' But though this young nobleman (he was only twenty-five years of age) again joined the insurgent forces, he ceased henceforward to take any interest in their deliberations or debates. The Rev. Robert Patten, who officiated as chaplain to the insurgents, and afterwards wrote a history of the rebellion, indeed states that the Earl 'was never afterwards called to any council of war, and was slighted in various ways, having often no quarters provided for him, and at other times very bad ones, not fit for a nobleman of his family; yet, being in for it, he resolved to go forward, and diverted himself with any company, telling many pleasant stories of his travels, and his living unknown and obscurely with a blacksmith in France, whom he served some years as a bellows-blower and under-servant, till he was acquainted with the death of his father, and that his tutor had given out that he was dead, upon which he resolved to return home, and when there met with a cold reception.'

== Capture and trial ==
The Scottish army, having advanced into England against Lord Winton's advice, capitulated at Preston, in Lancashire, after a fierce engagement on 14 November 1715.

The Earl fought with great gallantry at the barricades of Preston, but was at last obliged to surrender along with the other insurgents, and was carried a prisoner to London, and confined in the Tower. He was brought to trial before the House of Lords, 15 March 1716, and defended himself with considerable ingenuity. The High Steward, Lord Cooper, over-ruled his objections to the indictment with some harshness. Among the seventy-five "prisoners of quality" who surrendered there were, besides the head of the family, George Seton of Barnes, titular earl of Dunfermline, and Sir George and lodged in the Tower. He was tried apart from the other noblemen, having pleaded "not guilty" – only one to do so, as it would have been unworthy of a Seton to acknowledge himself (even constructively) as a traitor and throw himself on the mercy of the King George. The other Scottish Lords were the Earl of Nithsdale, Earl of Carnwath, Viscount Kenmur, and Baron Nairn. The young Earl of Derwentwater, an English Catholic involved in the same catastrophe, having pleaded "guilty" at his trial, (which, however, did not avail to save him) was induced by a priest who attended him on the scaffold, and hesitated giving him absolution, to retract the plea. This he did. To plead "guilty" was looked upon by strict theologians as a repudiation of one's lawful sovereign – James III. Lord Winton defended himself with spirit and ability; but, of course, was condemned to death. It was 19 March 1716.

His sentence was such a foregone conclusion that he laughed in the face of the Lord High Steward, who presided – Sir William, (afterward Earl) Cowper, telling him: "I hope you will do me justice, and do not make use of Coupar-law, as we used to say in our country. 'Hang a man first and then try him.'" He was punning on the name of Cowper, which was pronounced Cooper the same as Cupar, the Fife town, which was also sometimes written Cowper. To understand this joke, one must know the old cross of MacDuff, in Fife, was a famous sanctuary and that those "claiming the privilege of the Law of Clan MacDuff were required to appear afterwards before judges assembled at Cowper in Fife."; but by a sort of anticipatory Lynch Law, the criminal or suspected criminal who had run to the Cross did not always (after leaving the sanctuary) live to reach Cupar and have a fair trial; he was hanged before he got there.

Lord Winton's character was very original, and he was calumniated by enemies and misunderstood by friends, as though his plea and defence, so peculiar to himself, were signs of an unbalanced mind. Sir Walter Scott refutes these insinuations: "But, if we judge from his conduct in the rebellion, Lord Winton appears to have displayed more sense and prudence than most of those engaged in that unfortunate affair." While lying in the Tower under sentence, a trusty servant managed to furnish him with a file or other small instrument (some say it was only a watch-spring), with which he contrived to cut through the window bars in his cell and escaped. This was on 4 August 1716, about 9 o'clock at night. The earl got safe to France, and ultimately made his way to Rome.

== Exile and death ==
Among the manuscripts preserved in the archives of the Grand Lodge of Scotland are the Minutes of a Lodge of Scottish Freemasons existing in Rome in the years 1735, 1736 and 1737, from which we find that the Earl of Winton was himself admitted a Mason under the name (which he assumed on his attainder) of George Seaton Winton at a meeting held at Joseppe's, in the Corso, Rome, on 16 August 1735.

He is supposed to have died there, unmarried, on 19 December 1749, when over seventy years of age. One of the last accounts of him was as follows: "Walked two hours with Lord Dunbar in the gardens, and afterwards went to the coffeehouse to which Lord Winton resorted and several of his stamp, and there fell a-singing old Scots songs, and were merry."

Male cadets of this family, however, came by intermarriage to represent the great historic families of Huntly and Eglinton, besides the ducal house of Gordon, now extinct, and the Earls of Sutherland, whose heiress married the Marquis of Stafford, afterwards created Duke of Sutherland. The earldoms of Winton and Dunfermline, the viscounty of Kingston, and the other Seton titles were forfeited for the adherence of their possessors to the Stewart dynasty, and have never been restored; but the late Earl of Eglinton was, in 1840, served heir-male general of the family, and, in 1859, was created Earl of Winton in the peerage of the United Kingdom.

It is not well known where Lord Winton is buried, although several of his name and family have made search. In two oral traditions which converge substantially to the same conclusion it is related that he returned to Scotland in disguise, and died there unknown, except to very few; the other, that he died in the Catholic faith, in obscurity, at Ormiston. Some writers have said empathetically that he died a Protestant.

"Thus terminated", says Sir Robert Douglas, "one of the principal houses in Great Britain, after subsisting for upwards of 600 years in east Lothian, and from thence spreading into several flourishing branches in Scotland."

Peerage of Scotland
| Preceded by George Seton | Earl of Winton; 1704–1716 | Forfeit |
