= Robert Seton, 1st Earl of Winton =

Scottish peer who supported Mary, Queen of Scots

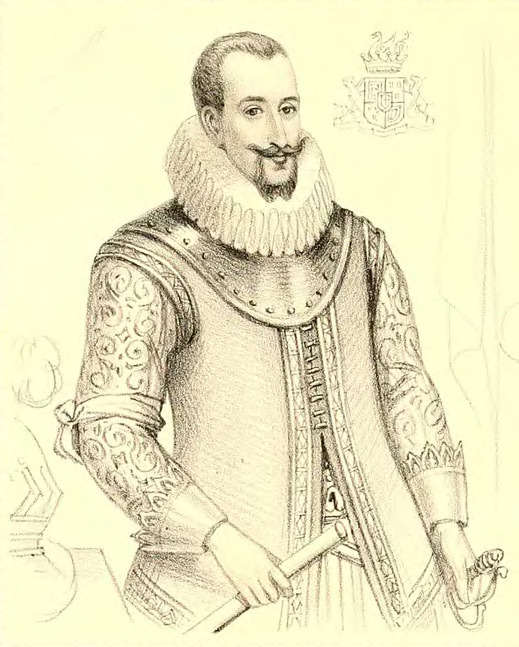

1st Earl of Winton
- In office 1600–1603

Personal details
- Born: 1553
- Died: 22 March 1603 (aged 49–50)
- Spouse: Margaret Montgomerie
- Children: 6, including Robert, George, and Alexander
- Parent(s): George Seton, 7th Lord Seton and Isabel Hamilton

Robert Seton, 1st Earl of Winton (1553 – 22 March 1603) was one of the Scottish peers who supported Mary, Queen of Scots.

== Early years ==
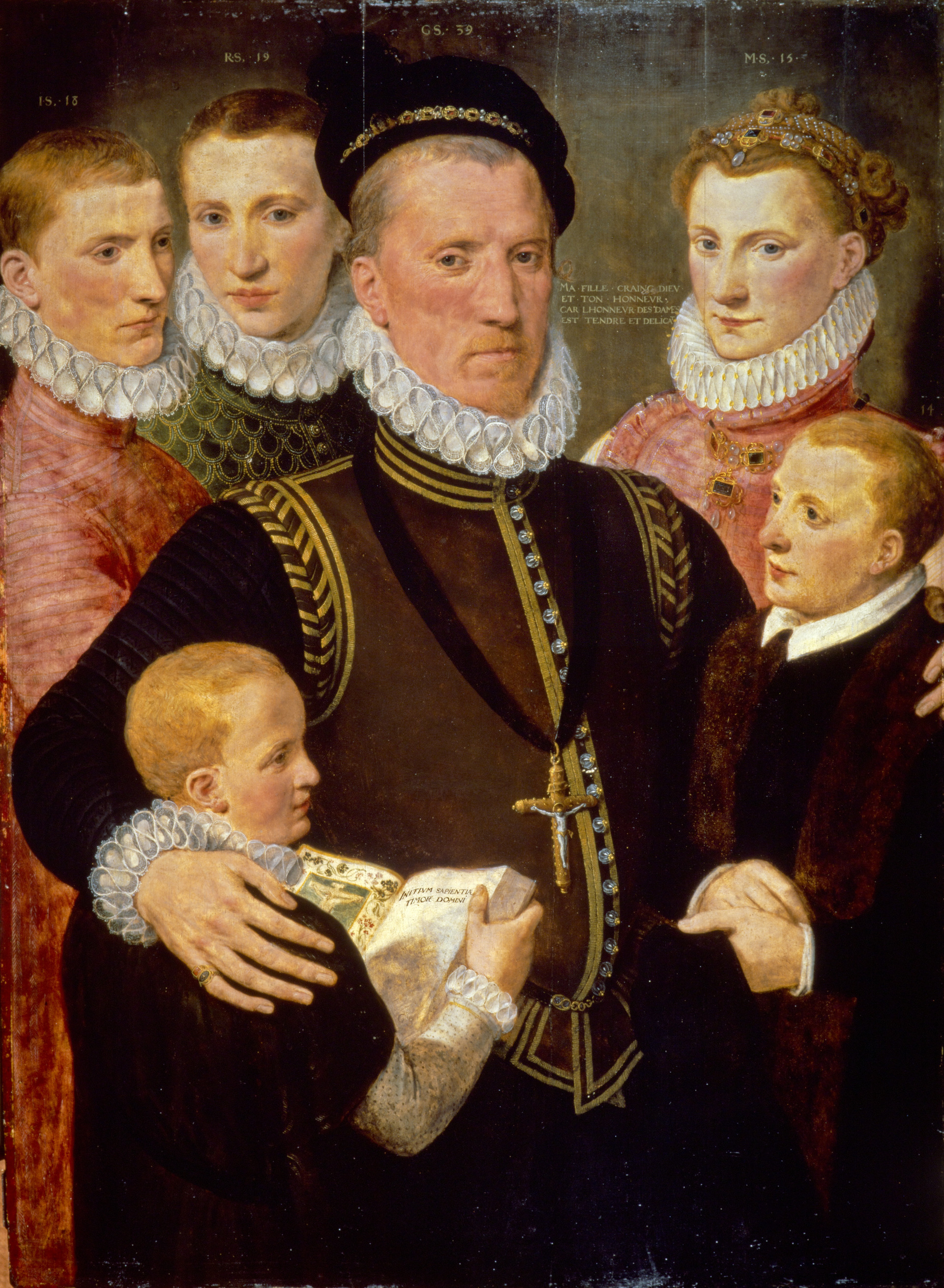
George, Lord Seton and his children in 1572, including Margaret, Lady Paisley, Robert Seton, Sir John Seton of Barns and Alexander, Earl of Dunfermline

The son of George Seton, 7th Lord Seton, Robert Seton grew up active in the affairs of his father and of the State. He was educated early in France, and accompanied his father during his ambassadorships to France during the reign of Queen Mary. As a youth, he grew up a close childhood friend of the Queen's son, the future King James VI.

== Langside ==
Like his father, he was strongly attached to the Queen and to the Royal House of Stuart, and was part of his father's rescue party for Queen Mary from Lochleven Castle. He was also present at the battle of Langside in 1568. He was later one of the party who rescued King James VI from the hands of the Douglases, and supported his monarch during the Gowrie and other conspiracies of the time.

== Estates ==
Upon the death of his father, in 1586, Robert succeeded as 8th Lord Seton. Although his father left the estates heavily encumbered by reason of the great expense of several embassies and of his losses suffered by adhering to the Queen's party, yet by prudence and ability he was soon able to put his affairs in good condition and provide both sons and daughters with respectable fortunes. He was very hospitable at Seton Palace, where James VI and Anne of Denmark, and ambassadors and strangers of quality were nobly entertained. Anne of Denmark came to Seton Palace in a litter in 1597 and planned to make an excursion to the Bass Rock.

Seton improved his property, especially by working on the old harbour of Cockenzie, a fishing village of great antiquity on the Firth of Forth, to accommodate vessels of a larger size. In January 1599 the king granted him a charter under the Great Seal of Scotland concerning Cockenzie, which had previously been erected into a free port and burgh of barony.

== Role as courtier ==
In August 1594 he was Grand Master of the King's Household at the baptism of Prince Henry at Stirling Castle. This state role was usually held by the Earl of Argyll, but Argyll was out of favour. As part of the Scottish royal baptism ceremony, Lord Seton carried the basin into the Chapel Royal.

Balthasar Fuchs von Bimbach came to the baptism with the Danish ambassadors and kept an Album Amicorum, a kind of autograph book, recording the people he met, including Seton. Seton drew a sketch of his heraldry and monogram in the book, with his motto "Indissolubile", meaning "inseparable".

When James VI planned to visit the west and the islands of Scotland in August 1598, Lord Seton was made convenor of the Privy Council. Seton was a great favorite of James VI, and was created Earl of Winton at Holyroodhouse on 16 November 1600.

== Religion ==
A strict Roman Catholic, the Earl and his family suffered indignities from the Presbytery of Haddington, East Lothian, as may be seen by the Records.

One entry reads thus:

"1597. Setoun Kirk. The Presbitery asked Lord Setoun if he will suffer them to sit in the Kirk of Setoun for the space of two or three days, because they are to 'gang about' all the churches within their bounds; but this his Lordship altogether refused." Protestant worship has never been held in Seton Church, as after the family conformed they attended the Tranent parish church, leaving their own church deserted, as it has remained ever since.

== Marriage and children ==
In 1582, Lord Seton married Lady Margaret Montgomerie, eldest daughter of Hugh Montgomerie, 3rd Earl of Eglinton, by whom he had five sons and a daughter:

1. Robert Seton, 2nd Earl of Winton
2. George Seton, 3rd Earl of Winton
3. Sir Alexander Seton of Foulstruther, who succeeded as 6th Earl of Eglinton.
4. Sir Thomas Seton of Olivestob
5. Sir John Seton of St. Germains, who married Margaret Kellie
6. Lady Isabel Seton, who married (1) James Drummond, 1st Earl of Perth, (2) Francis, eldest son of Francis Stewart, 1st Earl of Bothwell.

== Death and burial ==
In his Latter-Will, dated 28 February 1603, the Earl wrote, "My body to be buried whole in most humble, quiet, modest, and Christian manner without all extraordinary pomp or unlawful ceremony, within my College Church of Seton among my progenitors of worthy memory." By the words unlawful ceremony, the staunch old Catholic nobleman may have meant that he didn't want any Protestant interference or Kirk rites at his funeral. He was buried on Tuesday 5 April, on the same day that King James VI of Scotland set out from Edinburgh for London to become King James I of England. The king's company waited at the orchard of Seton Palace until the funeral was over, so that mourners did not leave to follow the king.

The 19th-century historian Patrick Fraser Tytler imagined the scene:

"As the monarch passed the house of Seton, near Musselburgh, he was met by the funeral of Lord Seton, a nobleman of high rank; which, with its solemn movement and sable trappings, occupied the road, and contrasted strangely and gloomily with the brilliant pageantry of the royal cavalcade. The Seton’s were one of the oldest and proudest families of Scotland; and that lord, whose mortal remains now passed by, had been a faithful adherent of the kings mother: whose banner he had never deserted, and in whose cause he had suffered exile and proscription. The meeting was thought ominous by the people. It appeared, to their excited imaginations, as if the moment had arrived when the aristocracy of Scotland was about to merge in that of Great Britain; as if the Scottish nobles had finished their career of national glory, and this last representative of their race had been arrested on his road to the grave, to bid farewell to the last of Scotland’s kings. As the mourners moved slowly onward, the monarch himself, participating in these melancholy feelings, sat down by the way-side, on a stone still pointed out to the historical pilgrim; nor did he resume his progress till the gloomy procession had completely disappeared."

Peerage of Scotland
New creation	Earl of Winton; 1600–1603	Succeeded by Robert Seton
Preceded by George Seton	Lord Seton; 1586–1603	Succeeded by Robert Seton
