= Alexander Seton, 1st Viscount of Kingston =

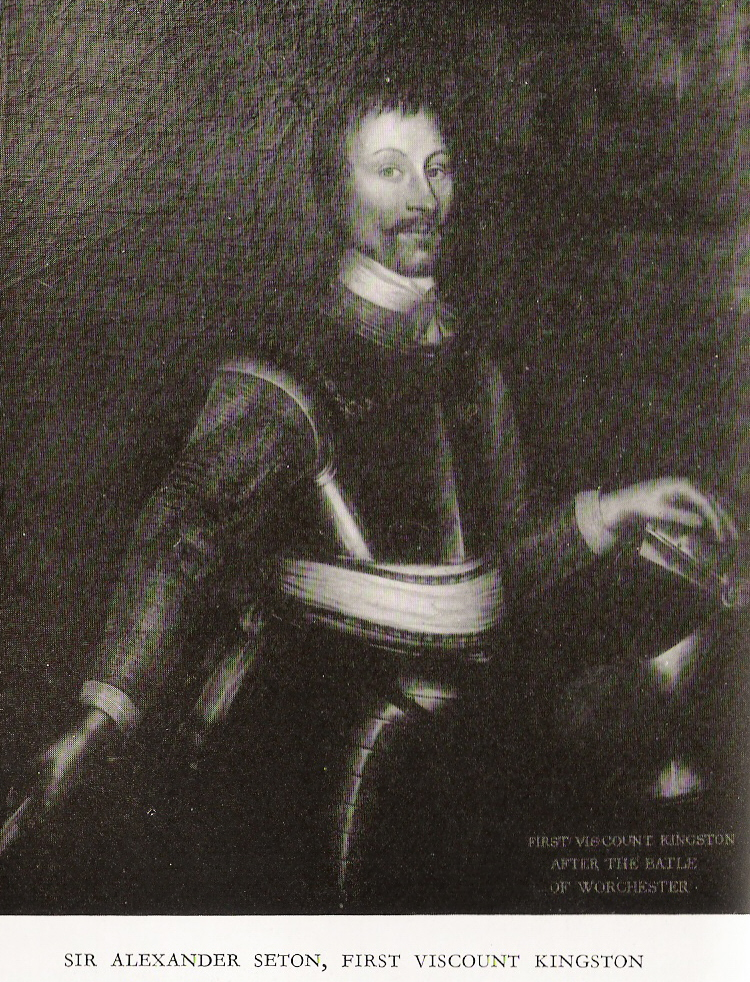

Sir Alexander Seton, 1st Viscount of Kingston (13 March 1620 – 21 October 1691), a Cavalier, was the first dignity Charles II conferred as King.

== Family ==
Alexander was the son of George Seton, 3rd Earl of Winton (1584–1650) by Anna Hay, daughter to Francis Hay, 9th Earl of Erroll (d.1631).

== Child Knight ==
At the early age of twelve, he received King Charles I on a visit to Seton Palace, delivering himself of a Latin oration at the iron gates of the palace in the presence of His Majesty. There and then the King conferred upon him the honour of knighthood, remarking as he did so: "Now, Sir Alexander, see that this does not spoil your school; by the appearance you will be a scholar."

== Excommunication ==
After extensive travels in foreign lands Sir Alexander came home in 1640. But, refusing to sign the Covenant in 1643, he was excommunicated in Tranent Church, and had to flee to France.

== Cavalier ==
Upon returning he was entrusted with important State business by King Charles II, who created him Viscount of Kingston on 14 February 1651 with limitation to the heirs male of his body. His title was taken from a village of that name in Dirleton parish, about two miles south-west of North Berwick. On the day of his creation, Sir Alexander was, with a gallant little garrison, defending Tantallon Castle against Oliver Cromwell who had laid siege to it. Following twelve days and a "battering with grate canon" the defenders were compelled to surrender, but only after quarter had been granted to them in recognition of their bravery.

In 1668 Lord Kingston was appointed, by the King, commander of the Haddingtonshire Militia.

== Marriages ==
Lord Kingston married four times.

Firstly to Jean Fletcher (d. August 1651), only daughter of Sir George Fletcher, Gentleman of the Privy Chamber in Ordinary to King Charles I, and brother of Andrew Fletcher, Lord Innerpeffer, a senator of the College of Justice, and had issue:

- Ann, born at Seton House on 24 April 1651, who married James Douglas, 3rd Lord Mordington (b.1651).

Kingston married secondly Elizabeth Douglas (30 May 1632, Stoneypath Tower, near Garvald, - Wednesday 21 October 1668, Whittingehame) sister and heir of Archibald Douglas of Whittingehame, and had issue:

- Charles Seton, Master of Kingston (1653-1682)
- George Seton (1654-1678)
- Alexander Seton (1655-1676)
- Archibald Seton, 2nd Viscount Kingston
- Arthur Seton (1665-1691), died two days after his father.
- John Seton (1666-1674)
- James Seton, 3rd Viscount Kingston
- Isobel Seton (1656-1674)
- Barbara Seton (1659-1679)
- Elizabeth Seton (b.1668), married in 1695 to William Hay of Duns, Scottish Borders and Drumelzier

Following the death of Elizabeth Douglas, Kingston married Elizabeth Hamilton, daughter of John Hamilton, 1st Lord Belhaven and Stenton and Margaret Hamilton, Lady Belhaven and Stenton.

Following the death of Elizabeth Hamilton he married fourthly, Lady Margaret Douglas, daughter of Archibald Douglas, 1st Earl of Ormond and Lady Jane Wemyss. He had no issue by his last two wives.

== Burial ==
Lord Kingston was buried on 25 October 1691, within the parish church of Whittingehame, Haddingtonshire.

== Works ==
Kingston wrote a continuation of his family history which was begun a century earlier by Sir Richard Maitland;

- Maitland, Richard, and Seton, Alexander, The History of the House of Seytoun to 1559 by Sir Richard Maitland of Lethington continued by Alexnder Viscount Kingston, Maitland Club (1829)

Peerage of Scotland
New creation	Viscount of Kingston; 1651–1691	Succeeded by Archibald Seton
