= Claud Hamilton of Shawfield =

Scottish gentleman of the privy chamber to King James VI and I (died 1614)

- Died: 19 October 1614; Dublin, Ireland
- Spouse: Janet Hamilton
- Children: William, Margaret, Grizel, & others
- Parents: Claud, 1st Lord Paisley (father); Margaret Seton (mother)

Sir Claud Hamilton of Shawfield, PC (Ire) (died 1614), also called of Leckprevick, a younger son of Claud Hamilton, 1st Lord Paisley in Scotland, was a gentleman of the privy chamber of King James VI and I, an undertaker in the Plantation of Ulster, and a privy counsellor in Ireland.

== Birth and origins ==
Claud was born between 1575 and 1585, (Note: His date of birth is constrained by the birth of his eldest brother, James, on 12 August 1575 and on his appointment as gentleman of the king's bed chamber, which occurred when he was 18 and before 1603 when the king left for London) probably at Paisley, near Glasgow, Scotland, his parents' habitual residence. He was the third son (Note: Claud Hamilton of Shawfield is described as the third son in the Scots Peerage but John Lodge and Edmund Burke omitted his elder brother John and counted Claud as the second son.) of Claud Hamilton and his wife Margaret Seton. His father was at that time only a younger brother of James Hamilton, 3rd Earl of Arran but would later be created 1st Lord Paisley. His father's family descended from Walter FitzGilbert, the founder of the House of Hamilton, who had received the barony of Cadzow from Robert the Bruce.

Claud's mother was a daughter of George Seton, 7th Lord Seton, (Note: Numbered as the 5th Lord Seton by James Balfour Paul.) by his wife Isobel Hamilton. Both parents were Scottish and seem to have been both Catholic. They had married in 1574 at Niddry Castle, West Lothian, Scotland, which belonged to the Setons.

Several of his siblings died in their infancy or childhood. Six reached adulthood and are listed in his father's article.

== Early life ==
Being named "of Shawfield" seems to imply that his father gave him Shawfield, in the northern tip of modern South Lanarkshire, near Rutherglen, as appanage. Paul (1904) explains "Shawfield, co. Linlithgow", but there seems to be no Shawfield in that county. In 1579 the Scottish privy council decided to arrest his father and his uncle John. They were besieged at Hamilton and then escaped to England and even France. Claud and his mother seem to have staid behind in Scotland. His father returned in 1586 and was created Lord Paisley in 1587.

== Gentleman of the privy chamber ==
At the age of 18 Claud Hamilton was made a gentleman of the privy chamber to the young King James VI of Scotland.

After the Union of the Crowns in 1603, Claude Hamilton spent time with the royal court in London. In 1610 he was naturalized as a denizen of England and given lands in Ireland, described as "the small proportion of Edeneveagh in the barony or precint of Fues in County Armagh".

Some of his papers are held by the University of Edinburgh among the Laing manuscripts. These include estate papers relating to Ireland and Scotland, an detailing fabrics, a tailor's bill from 1614, and bill for hats, pewter, and other items. The bills include costume accessories which he bought in London for his family in Scotland and his brother Frederick, including; a "white satin piccadill with two laced bands of the newest fashion for a young woman", a "fine satin picadell for Phredrik of the newest fashion", with "two pair of worset stockings meet for a large young woman's leg", and "thirty yards of flowered taffeta or some other bonny stitched [embroidered] stuff for his daughters". A waistcoat of crimson taffeta was bought at the Sign of the Horse Shoe in the Old Exchange.

== Marriage and children ==
Family tree

Claud Hamilton with wife, parents, and other selected relatives. (Note: This family tree is partly derived from the Abercorn pedigree pictured in The Complete Peerage, from the description of the Abercorn genealogy in The Scots Peerage and the descriptions of the lineages of the Hamilton baronets of Woodbrook and the Cole-Hamiltons of Beltrim. Also see the lists of siblings and children in the text.)

James; 2nd Earl c. 1516 – 1575; Châtellerault	Margaret; Douglas	George; Lord Seton; 1531–1586
James; 3rd Earl; 1537–1609	John; 1st Marquess; Hamilton; 1540–1604	Claud; 1st Lord; Paisley; 1546–1621	Margaret; Seton d. 1616
James; 1st Earl; 1575–1618	Claud of Shawfield d. 1614	Janet; Hamilton d. 1613	George of Greenlaw & Roscrea d. bef. 1657
Elizabeth; Johnston	William of Elieston c. 1604 – 1664	Beatrix; Campbell d. c. 1668
James; Hamilton of Elieston	Mary; Jacob	Claud; Hamilton of Montalony d. 1695	Isabella

Legend

XXX	Subject of the article	XXX	Earls of Abercorn	XXX	Earls of Arran	XXX	Marquesses of Hamilton

At Paisley in 1602 Sir Claud married Janet or Jonet Hamilton (died 1613), the only child of Robert Hamilton of Leckprevick and Easter Greenlees, Lanarkshire, Scotland. Due to this inheritance Hamilton was also called "of Leckprevick". Leckprevick and East Greenlees are both in the north of South Lanarkshire, the former near East Kilbride, the latter near Rutherglen.

Claud and Janet had six sons:

- William (c. 1604 – 1662)
- Alexander (born after 1605), died young
- Robert (died 1657)
- Claud
- James, died unmarried
- George, died unmarried

—and three daughters:

- Margaret, married John Stewart of Methven, an illegitimate son of Ludovic Stewart, 2nd Duke of Lennox, who was an abusive husband. She later married Sir John Seton of Gargunnock.
- Grizel, married William Baillie of Lamington
- Janet, named in her mother's will together with her two sisters

In an alternative view, Claud Hamilton married Mary Hamilton, daughter of Robert Hamilton of Elieston or Illieston in West Lothian (unless her husband was Claud Hamilton of Toon) The Hamiltons of Elieston were a Catholic family, and Lauder of Fountainhall recorded that there was accommodation in the house for a priest.

== Plantation of Ulster ==
The flight of the earls in September 1607 cleared the way for the Plantation of Ulster. Like his eldest brother James and his next brother George Hamilton of Greenlaw and Roscrea, Claud was an undertaker in the plantation. However, he must not be confused with Claud Hamilton of Clonyn, who was an undertaker in County Cavan. Claud Hamilton of Shawfield was granted the small proportions of Killeny and Teadane (or Eden). A small proportion in the Fews precinct in County Armagh was granted to "Claude Hamilton". It seems not to be known which Claud Hamilton this was.

The small proportion of Teadane was in County Londonderry on the boundaries of Coleraine and Loughinsholin baronies. At the time the Loughinsholin barony was in County Tyrone but it became in 1613 part of the new County Londonderry.

In 1618 and 1619 Hamilton built a castle on his land. This castle stood near the village of Donemana which probably was part of the Killeny proportion. The site is perhaps that now occupied by the ruin of the Earlsgift Castle. The name Killenny now refers to a townland in the Donaghedy Parish of the Strabane Lower barony. This townland is 225 acres big and lies south of Donemana on the right bank of Burn Dennett.

It is sure that Claud Hamilton was a knight, but it is not known when this honor was bestowed on him. It seem that it is in the context of the plantation of Ulster that he is called "Sir Claude" (sic) for the first time. He might of course have been knighted much earlier.

== Later life ==
Claud Hamilton was appointed to the Privy Council of Ireland on 11 February 1613.

His wife died in September 1613.

== Death ==
Sir Claud Hamilton of Shawfield died in Dublin on 19 October 1614. The Laing papers contain a letter that describes the event in detail. Robert Maxwell, an Anglican priest and Dean of Armagh, was called to his bedside because he was skilled as a physician. Sir Claud Hamilton, constable of the Fort of Toome, also was there. Claud Hamilton of Shawfield predeceased his father who would die in 1621 and his mother who would die in 1616. Administration of his estate was granted to his eldest son William only 15 years later on 29 November 1629.

== Possible misidentifications ==
Sir Claud Hamilton of Shawfield (died 1614) is sometimes confused with Sir Claud Hamilton (died 1640), constable of the Fort of Toome, and with Sir Claud Hamilton of Clonyn (died before 1618), father of Sir Francis Hamilton, 1st Baronet, of Killock. According to James Balfour Paul:

"He is confounded by Lodge with Sir Claud Hamilton of Castle Toome, in the county of Antrim, eldest son and heir of Sir Claud Hamilton of Cocknogh, and brother of Archibald Hamilton, Archbishop of Cashel 1640 to 1659. It was this Sir Claud who, by privy seal, dated at Westminster 6 October 1618, was made Constable of the Castle or Fort of Toome on the surrender of Sir Thomas Phillips. By his first wife he had no issue. He married, secondly, Anne, daughter of Sir Henry Colley of Castle Carbery, in the county of Kildare, and had a son Robert, who died an infant, and three daughters. He died, 5 June 1640, at Roscrea in the county of Tipperary, and was buried in the monastery there. (Funeral entry, Ulster's Office.) He is not to be confused with Sir Claud Hamilton, second son of Sir Alexander Hamilton of Innerwick, who was granted the lands of Clonyn, otherwise Taghleagh, in the county of Cavan, by patent dated 23 June 1610, and died vita patris before February 1618. He married Jane, daughter of Robert Lauder of the Bass, and left, with other issue, Sir Francis Hamilton of Killagh, otherwise Castle Hamilton, co. Cavan, who was created a Baronet of Nova Scotia 29 September 1628."
