= Claud Hamilton of the Fort of Toome =

Constable of the Fort of Toome (died 1640)

Claud Hamilton
- Died: 5 June 1640; Roscrea
- Spouse: Janet Hamilton
- Children: William of Elieston & others
- Parents: Claud Hamilton of Cochno (father); Margaret Betoun (mother)

Sir Claud Hamilton (died 1640) was constable of the Fort of Toome in County Antrim, Ulster, Ireland. He is sometimes confused with Claud Hamilton of Shawfield.

== Birth and origins ==
Claud was the eldest son of Claud Hamilton and his wife Margaret Betoun. His father was Laird of Cochno (also spelled Cochnough) in Dunbartonshire in Scotland. Robert Hamilton of Briggis was a brother of his paternal grandfather. His father's family probably was a cadet branch of the House of Hamilton founded by Walter fitz Gilbert of Cadzow. Claud's mother was a daughter of Robert Betoun of Creich.

Family tree

Claud Hamilton with his two wives, his parents, and other selected relatives. (Note: This family tree is partly derived from several sources. The marriage of his grandparent Also see the lists of siblings and children in the text.)

Andrew; Hamilton of Cochno d. 1573	Margaret; Noble
Robert; Hamilton of Elieston	Claud; Hamilton of Cochno d. 1611	Margaret; Betoun
Mary; Hamilton	Claud; Constable of Toome d. 1629	Anne; Colley	Archibald; Archbishop of Cashel c. 1580 – 1659
Robert; Hamilton

Legend

XXX	Subject of the article	XXX	Archbishop of Cachel

He was the eldest of several brothers but only the first (himself) and the second are known:

1. Claud (died 1640)
2. Archibald (c. 1580 – 1659), Anglican Archbishop of Cashel

== Homonym friend ==
Hamilton was a friend of his homonym Sir Claud Hamilton of Shawfield with whom he is sometimes confused. He was present at his friend's deathbed in Dublin on 19 October 1614.

== First marriage ==
Claud Hamilton married Mary Hamilton, the only child of Sir Robert Hamilton (died 1657), a knight, of Elieston in County Tyrone. (Note: Bernard Burke confused Claud Hamilton of Shawfield, the third son of Claud Hamilton, 1st Lord Paisley with the subject of this article. First he makes this third son the constable of the Fort of Toome. Later he drops this claim but still makes the third son the ancestor of the Hamiltons of Woodbrook and Beltrim.) His wife's father was an undertaker in the Plantation of Ulster and settled at Badoney, Barony Strabane, County Tyrone, which he renamed Ellieston. As there is a house called Ellieston near Edinburgh that once belonged to some Hamiltons, it might be that Mary's father had come from there. In this case, he would have been a Catholic. Claud Hamilton had no children with his first wife, but he inherited the Elieston manor (County Tyrone).

== Second marriage ==
He married secondly Anne Colley, daughter of Henry Colley (died 1601) of Carbury Castle, County Kildare.

Claud and Anne had four children; his son Robert who died young and three daughters whose names are not known.

== Constable of the Fort of Toome ==
On 6 October 1618, Hamilton was appointed constable of the Fort of Toome (also called the Castle of Toome).

== Death ==
His death is described differently by two authors. According to James Balfour Paul, Hamilton died on 5 June 1640 at Roscrea, County Tipperary and was buried in the monastery. However, according to Bernard Burke, he died in 1629.

== Possible misidentifications ==
Claud Hamilton, the constable of the Fort of Toome (died 1629) is sometimes confused with Claud Hamilton of Shawfield (died 1614), and also with Sir Claud Hamilton (died 1618), who had a son, Francis, who became a baronet.

Sir Claud Hamilton, the constable of the Fort of Toome, was the eldest son and heir of Claud Hamilton of Cochno (also called Cochnough or Cochonogh) in Dunbartonshire, Scotland. His younger brother was Archibald Hamilton, Anglican Archbishop of Cashel. Sir Claud was made Constable of the Fort of Toome in 1618. He married the daughter of Sir Robert Hamilton of Elieston, County Tyrone. and had a son Sir William of Elieston from whom descend the Hamiltons of Beltrim Castle at Gortin.
