= George Hamilton of Greenlaw and Roscrea =

Ulster planter in the Strabane Precinct

The Honourable Sir George Hamilton
- Died: between 1631 and 1657
- Spouses: 1. Isobel Leslie; 2. Mary Butler
- Children: James
- Parents: Claud, 1st Lord Paisley (father); Margaret Seton (mother)

Sir George Hamilton of Greenlaw and Roscrea (died between 1631 and 1657) was an undertaker in the Plantation of Ulster. Born and bred in Scotland, by 1611 he had moved to Ireland with his Scottish wife to occupy his plantation grant. In 1630 he married his second wife and moved to Roscrea in southern Ireland, which his father-in-law, the 11th Earl of Ormond, leased to him in lieu of dowry.

Thomas Carte (1736) in his Life of James Duke of Ormonde confused Hamilton with his nephew Sir George Hamilton, 1st Baronet of Donalong, leading to the belief that Mary Hamilton, the duke's sister and mother of Antoine Hamilton, the author of the Mémoires du Comte de Grammont, stayed at Roscrea when it was captured by Owen Roe O'Neill in 1646 during the Irish Confederate Wars.

Family tree

George Hamilton with his two wives, his parents, his homonymous nephew with whom he is often confused, and other selected relatives. (Note: This family tree is partly derived from the Abercorn pedigree pictured in The Complete Peerage, and from the description of the Abercorn genealogy.)

James; 2nd Earl c. 1516 – 1575; Châtellerault	Margaret; Douglas	George; Lord Seton; 1531–1586
James; 3rd Earl; 1537–1609	John; 1st Marquess; Hamilton; 1540–1604	Claud; 1st Lord; Paisley; 1546–1621	Margaret; Seton d. 1616
James; 1st Earl; Abercorn; 1575–1618	Isobel; Leslie	George of Greenlaw & Roscrea d. bef. 1657	Mary; Butler
James; 2nd Earl d. c. 1670	George; Hamilton; 1st Baronet c. 1608 – 1679	Mary; Butler d. 1680	James; Hamilton d. 1659

Legend

XXX	Subject of the article	XXX	Earls of Abercorn	XXX	Earls of Arran	XXX	Marquesses of Hamilton

== Birth and origins ==
George was born between 1575 and 1590, (Note: Born after his eldest (1575) and before his youngest brother (1590)) probably at Paisley in Renfrewshire in the west of Scotland, the fourth son of Claud Hamilton and his wife Margaret Seton. His father was on 24 July 1587 created Lord Paisley. His paternal grandfather (died 1575) had been the 2nd Earl of Arran in the Peerage of Scotland and Duke of Châtellerault in the Kingdom of France. His father's family descended from Walter FitzGilbert, the founder of the House of Hamilton, who had received the barony of Cadzow from Robert the Bruce in the 14th century.

George's mother was a daughter of George Seton, 7th Lord Seton. (Note: Numbered as the 5th Lord Seton by James Balfour Paul.) His parents had married in 1574 at Niddry Castle, West Lothian, Scotland. Both sides of the family were Scottish, Catholic, and supporters of Mary, Queen of Scots. His father and his father-in-law had both fought for her at Langside in 1568. George was one of six siblings. See James, Claud, and Frederick. (Note: George's father's article gives a list of all the nine siblings.)

== First marriage ==
Between 1602 and 1609, Hamilton married Isobel Leslie, his first wife. She was Scottish, the widow of Robert Lundie of Newhall in Fife. Their marriage date is constrained by her first husband's death in October 1602 and a document of 1609 that mentions her as Hamilton's wife. Isobel was the second daughter of James Leslie and his first wife, Margaret Lindsay. As her father predeceased her grandfather, the 5th Earl of Rothes, her father never succeeded to the earldom but was known by the courtesy title "Master of Rothes". The Leslies were Protestants, but her grandfather fought for the Queen at Langside. Neither of Isobel's marriages produced surviving children. (Note: According to Lodge (1789) Hamilton married as his first wife Isabella Civico from Bruges in Flanders and had a daughter Margaret. However, Cokayne (1902 explains that Lodge confused George with John, his elder brother, who lived in Flanders and whose daughter Margaret indeed married Sir Archibald Acheson.)

== Plantation of Ulster ==
The Flight of the Earls in 1607 cleared the way for the Plantation of Ulster. Like his elder brothers James and Claud, George was an undertaker in the plantation. In 1610 he received a "proportion" of land in the Strabane "precinct", which corresponds to the modern baronies of Strabane Lower and Strabane Upper. His eldest brother, James, 1st Earl of Abercorn, was the chief undertaker in this precinct. By 1611, Hamilton had, according to the Carew Report, (Note: A survey made of the progress of the plantation by George Carew, 1st Earl of Totnes, in 1611) moved to Ireland and was living on his Irish lands with his wife and family. The report calls him a knight. When his elder brother Claud (of Shawfield) died in 1614, George took, in addition to his own, charge of Claud's proportions Eden (formerly called Teadane) and Killiny.

According to Nicholas Pynnar's survey in 1619, Hamilton owned Largie, a middle proportion (1,500 acres), and Derrywoon, a small proportion (1000 acres). Largie lay between the proportions Strabane and Donalong, which belonged to his eldest brother. Hamilton had built a stone house and bawn as well as a village on Largie. The modern villages of Artigarvan and Ballymagorry stand on it. There is a townland called Greenlaw next to Ballymagorry. Derrywoon lay further south on the lower River Derg. Hamilton had built a bawn as well as a village on it. Derrywoon includes the modern Baronscourt estate. Jointly with Sir William Stewart, Hamilton owned a middle proportion called Terremurearth, Tirenemurtagh, or Moynterlemy that had in 1611 belonged to a certain James Hayg.

== Second marriage and child ==
In 1630, Hamilton married as his second wife Lady Mary Butler, sixth daughter of the 11th Earl of Ormond. The dowry was fixed at £1,800. However, Ormond had difficulties to pay and in 1631 he agreed to let Hamilton enjoy the manor, castle, town, and lands of Roscrea for a duration of 21 years as a part payment of the dowry.

George and Mary had an only surviving child:

1. James (died 1659), who never married

== Roscrea attacked ==
On 5 June 1646 Owen Roe O'Neil with the Confederate Ulster army defeated the Covenanters under Robert Monro in the Battle of Benburb. O'Neill then marched south to Kilkenny as directed by Rinuccini, the papal nuncio. Leinster and Munster were treated as enemy territory. On 17 September 1646, O'Neill attacked and captured Roscrea where Hamilton's family lived. The Ulstermen spared them but put everybody else to the sword. On 18 September, Rinuccini overturned the Confederate government in a coup d'état with help of the Ulster Army, which Owen Roe O'Neill had marched to Leinster. O'Neill then menaced Dublin in November 1646.

== Death and timeline ==
Hamilton died between 1631 and 1657, probably in the early or mid 1640s. When O'Neill took Roscrea, Hamilton was therefore probably already dead, otherwise he might have been absent for some reason. He was survived by his son James, who would, however, die unmarried in 1659.

Timeline
As his birth date is uncertain, so are all his ages. Italics for historical background.
Age	Date	Event
0	Estimated 1582	Born
20–21	24 Mar 1603	Accession of James VI and I, succeeding Elizabeth I
21–22	15 Oct 1604	Sir Arthur Chichester appointed Lord Deputy of Ireland
23–24	Betw. 1602 & 1609	Married Isobel Leslie
24–25	4 Sep 1607	Flight of the earls: Hugh O'Neill, Earl of Tyrone, and Rory O'Donnell, Earl of Tyrconnell, left Ireland.
31–32	19 Oct 1614	Elder brother, Claud Hamilton of Shawfield, died.
32–33	2 Jul 1615	Oliver St John, appointed Lord Deputy of Ireland
42–43	27 Mar 1625	Accession of Charles I, succeeding James I
47–48	1630	Married Mary Butler as his 2nd wife
48–49	16 Apr 1631	Was granted Roscrea for 21 years
50–51	18 Feb 1633	Father-in-law, Walter Butler, 11th Earl of Ormond, died.
50–51	3 Jul 1633	Thomas Wentworth, later Earl of Strafford, appointed Lord Deputy of Ireland
58–59	23 Oct 1641	Outbreak of the Rebellion
60–61	13 Nov 1643	James Butler, 1st Marquess of Ormond appointed Lord Lieutenant of Ireland
63–64	5 Jun 1646	Battle of Benburb
63–64	17 Sep 1646	Wife (or widow?) spared at the taking of Roscrea Castle.
63–64	Betw. 1631 & 1657	Probably died in the early or mid 1640s

== Notes and references ==
=== Sources ===
- Brewer, John Sherren; Bullen, William, eds. (1873). Calendar of the Carew Manuscripts Preserved in the Archiepiscopal Library at Lambeth. London: Longman & Co. OCLC 1181395955. – 1603 to 1624
- Burke, Bernard; Burke, Ashworth Peter (1915). A Genealogical and Heraldic History of the Peerage and Baronetage, the Privy Council, Knightage and Companionage (77th ed.). London: Harrison. OCLC 1155471554.
- Carte, Thomas (1851) [1st pub. 1736]. The Life of James Duke of Ormond. Vol. III (New ed.). Oxford: Oxford University Press. OCLC 1086656347. – 1643 to 1660
- Casway, Jerrold I. (2004). "O'Neill, Owen Roe [Eoghan Ruadh O'Neill] (c.1550–1649)". In Matthew, Colin; Harrison, Brian (eds.). Oxford Dictionary of National Biography. Vol. 41. New York: Oxford University Press. pp. 851–856. ISBN 0-19-861391-1.
- Chisholm, Hugh, ed. (1910). "Hamilton, the name of a famous Scottish family". Encyclopædia Britannica. Vol. XII (11th ed.). New York: The Encyclopædia Britannica Company. pp. 878–879. OCLC 43740094.
- Clarke, Aidan; Edwards, Robert Dudley (1976). "Chapter VII: Pacification, Plantation, and the Catholic Question". In Moody, Theodore William; Martin, F. X.; Byrne, Francis John (eds.). A New History of Ireland. Vol. III. Oxford: Oxford University Press. pp. 187–232. ISBN 978-0-19-820242-4. – 1603–1623
- Coffey, Diarmid (1914). O'Neill and Ormond – A Chapter of Irish History. Dublin: Maunsel & Company. OCLC 906164979.
- Cusack, Mary Frances (1871). A Compendium of Irish History. Boston: Patrick Donahoe. OCLC 873009963.
- Duffy, Seán (2002). The Illustrated History of Ireland. New York: Contemporary Books. ISBN 0-8092-2437-2.
- Dunlop, Robert (1904). "Chapter 18: Ireland to the Settlement of Ulster". In Ward, Adolphus William; Prothero, G. W.; Leathes, Stanley (eds.). The Cambridge Modern History. Vol. III. Cambridge: Cambridge University Press. pp. 579–616. OCLC 1156334955. – 1500 to 1611
- Dunlop, Robert (1906). "Chapter 18: Ireland from the Plantation of Ulster to the Cromwellian Settlement (1611–1659)". In Ward, Adolphus William; Prothero, G. W.; Leathes, Stanley (eds.). The Cambridge Modern History. Vol. IV. Cambridge: Cambridge University Press. pp. 513–538. OCLC 1156334955. – 1611 to 1659
- Edwards, David (2004). "Butler, Walter, eleventh earl of Ormond and fourth Earl of Ossory (1559–1633)". In Matthew, Henry Colin Gray; Harrison, Brian (eds.). Oxford Dictionary of National Biography. Vol. 9. New York: Oxford University Press. pp. 230–231. ISBN 0-19-861359-8.
- Fryde, E. B.; Greenway, D. E.; Porter, S.; Roy, I., eds. (1986). Handbook of British Chronology. Royal Historical Society Guides and Handbooks, No. 2 (3rd ed.). London: Offices of the Royal Historical Society. ISBN 0-86193-106-8. – (for timeline)
- G. E. C. (1902). Complete Baronetage, 1611 to 1800. Vol. II (1st ed.). Exeter: William Pollard & Co. OCLC 866278985. – 1625 to 1649

Also: https://archive.org/details/completebaroneta02coka

- G. E. C. (1910). Gibbs, Vicary (ed.). The Complete Peerage of England, Scotland, Ireland, Great Britain and the United Kingdom, Extant, Extinct, or Dormant. Vol. I (2nd ed.). London: The St Catherine Press. OCLC 1042385438. – Ab-Adam to Basing
- Hayes-McCoy, G. A. (1990) [1st pub. 1969]. Irish Battles: A Military History of Ireland. Belfast: The Appletree Press. ISBN 0-86281-250-X.
- Hewitt, G. R. (2004). "Leslie, Andrew, fifth earl of Rothes c.1530–1611)". In Matthew, Colin; Harrison, Brian (eds.). Oxford Dictionary of National Biography. Vol. 35. New York: Oxford University Press. pp. 429–430. ISBN 0-19-861383-0.
- Hill, George (1877). An Historical Account of the Plantation in Ulster at the Commencement of the Seventeenth Century, 1608–1620. Dublin: McCaw Stevenson and Orr. OCLC 32638560.
- Hunter, R. J. (2018). Plantations in Ulster 1600–1641 (PDF). Belfast: Public Record Office of Northern Ireland. ISBN 978-1-909556-61-4.
- Lodge, John (1789). Archdall, Mervyn (ed.). The Peerage of Ireland or, A Genealogical History of the Present Nobility of that Kingdom. Vol. V. Dublin: James Moore. OCLC 264906028. – Viscounts
- Manning, Conleth (2001). "The Two Sir George Hamiltons and their Connections with the Castles of Roscrea and Nenagh" (PDF). Tipperary Historical Journal: 149–154.
- Moody, Theodore William; Martin, F. X. (2001) [1st pub. 1967]. The Course of Irish History (4th ed.). Oxford: Roberts Rinehart Publishers. ISBN 1-58979-002-2.
- Paul, Sir James Balfour (1904). The Scots Peerage, Founded on Wood's Edition of Sir Robert Douglas's Peerage of Scotland. Vol. I. Edinburgh: David Douglas. OCLC 505064285. – Abercorn to Balmerino (for Abercorn)
- Paul, Sir James Balfour (1907). The Scots Peerage, Founded on Wood's Edition of Sir Robert Douglas's Peerage of Scotland. Vol. IV. Edinburgh: David Douglas. OCLC 505064285. – Fife to Hyndford (for Hamilton)
- Paul, Sir James Balfour (1910). The Scots Peerage, Founded on Wood's Edition of Sir Robert Douglas's Peerage of Scotland. Vol. VII. Edinburgh: David Douglas. OCLC 505064285. – Panmure to Sinclair (for Rothes)
- Paul, Sir James Balfour (1911). The Scots Peerage, Founded on Wood's Edition of Sir Robert Douglas's Peerage of Scotland. Vol. VIII. Edinburgh: David Douglas. OCLC 505064285. – Sumerville to Winton (for Seton, earl of Winton)
- Sergeant, Philip Walsingham (1913). Little Jennings and Fighting Dick Talbot: A Life of the Duke and Duchess of Tyrconnel. Vol. I. London: Hutchinson. OCLC 474495830. – 1643 to 1685
- Warner, Ferdinand (1768). History of the Rebellion and Civil-War in Ireland. Vol. I. Dublin: James William. OCLC 82770539. – 1641 to 1643
