= Claud Hamilton, 1st Lord Paisley =

Scottish lord (1546–1621)

Claud Hamilton
- Lord Paisley
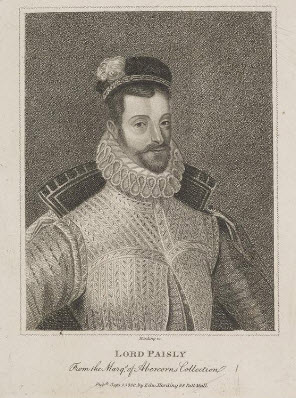
- Detail from the portrait below
- Tenure: 1587–1621
- Successor: James Hamilton
- Born: 9 June 1546
- Died: 3 May 1621 (aged 74)
- Spouse: Margaret Seton
- Issue Detail: James, Claud, Frederick, & others
- Father: James, 2nd Earl of Arran
- Mother: Margaret Douglas

Claud Hamilton, 1st Lord Paisley (9 June 1546 – 3 May 1621) was a Scottish nobleman who fought at the Battle of Langside in 1568 for Mary, Queen of Scots. He is the ancestor of the earls, marquesses and dukes of Abercorn.

== Birth and origins ==
Claud was born in 1546 and baptised on 9 June at Edinburgh Castle. He was the youngest son of James Hamilton and his wife Margaret Douglas. His father was the 2nd Earl of Arran in Scotland and 1st Duke of Châtellerault in France. His father's family descended from Walter FitzGilbert, the founder of the House of Hamilton, who had received the barony of Cadzow from Robert the Bruce in the 14th century. Claud's mother was a daughter of James Douglas, 3rd Earl of Morton. Both parents were Scottish. They had married in September 1532. Claud had four brothers and four sisters, who are listed in his father's article.

== Commendator of Paisley ==
His uncle John Hamilton, an illegitimate son of his grandfather, the 1st Earl of Arran, was commendatory abbot of Paisley Abbey around the time of his birth. In 1553 this uncle succeeded David Beaton as Archbishop of St Andrews and agreed to pass the position as commendator to his nephew Claud, who was then about seven years old.

== Scottish politics and the Battle of Langside ==
In March 1560, when he was 14, Hamilton was sent as a hostage to England to guarantee the Treaty of Berwick and lodged at Canterbury.

He and his family were Catholics and supporters of Mary, Queen of Scots. In May 1568, Mary escaped by rowing boat from Lochleven Castle. Claud Hamilton escorted her from Kinross to Niddry Castle. On 13 May, he fought for her at Langside where the Queen's men were defeated by Regent Moray. He had commanded the vanguard of her army during the battle. Claud Hamilton accompanied Mary to Workington in England.

His estates were forfeited. Hamilton was concerned in the assassination of Regent Moray by James Hamilton of Bothwellhaugh in January 1570, and also in that of the next Regent, Matthew Stewart, 4th Earl of Lennox, in 1571. In 1573 as the Marian Civil War came to an end, he recovered his estates.

== Later years ==
In 1562 his eldest brother, James, was declared insane. His father died at Hamilton on 22 January 1575. His brother James as the eldest inherited the title and estate but because of his insanity, Lord John, the second brother, had to stand in for him.

Regent Morton made a progress in September 1575. Claud and Sir James Hamilton escorted him from Dalkeith Palace to Linlithgow. In November 1575, while Morton held a justice ayre at Dumfries, Claud and Lord John took part in a horse race against English borderers at Solway sands.

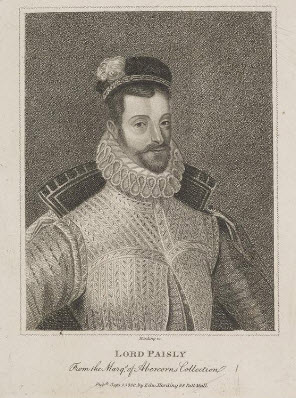
Lord Paisley

In 1579, the privy council decided to arrest both him and his brother John to punish them for their past misdeeds. It was claimed that Claud had not paid his dues to the crown as Commendator of Paisley Abbey. In May, the Hamiltons were besieged at Hamilton and at Craignethan Castle, then known as "Draffen". The Palace of Paisley was surrendered to the Master of Glencairn. They escaped to England, where Queen Elizabeth used them as pawns in the diplomatic game, and later Claud lived for a short time in France. In 1580, Claud was received into the Catholic church by James Tyrie.

In April 1583, Claud was in exile in England at Widdrington Castle in Northumberland. He wrote to Queen Elizabeth and Frances Walsingham for aid for his expenses living in this "sober house" especially as his wife was soon to visit.

In January 1586, Hamilton was in Paris where he met three supporters of Mary, Queen of Scots; Thomas Morgan, Charles Paget, and Albert Fontenay. Returning to Scotland in 1586 and meddling again in politics, he sought to reconcile James VI of Scotland with his mother; he was in communication with Philip II of Spain in the interests of Mary and the Roman Catholic religion, and neither the failure of Anthony Babington's plot nor even the defeat of the Spanish Armada put an end to these intrigues.

In 1587 he was created a Scottish Lord of Parliament as Lord Paisley, when the abbey was erected as a barony. With this the Hamilton family gained a second seat in Parliament, the first being held by his elder brother John for his eldest brother James, during his insanity. This seat in the Scottish Parliament was occupied after his death by his grandson James, the 2nd Earl of Abercorn and Lord Paysley became a subsidiary title of the earls, later marquesses and dukes of Abercorn, which was held by the heir apparent.

== Marriage and children ==
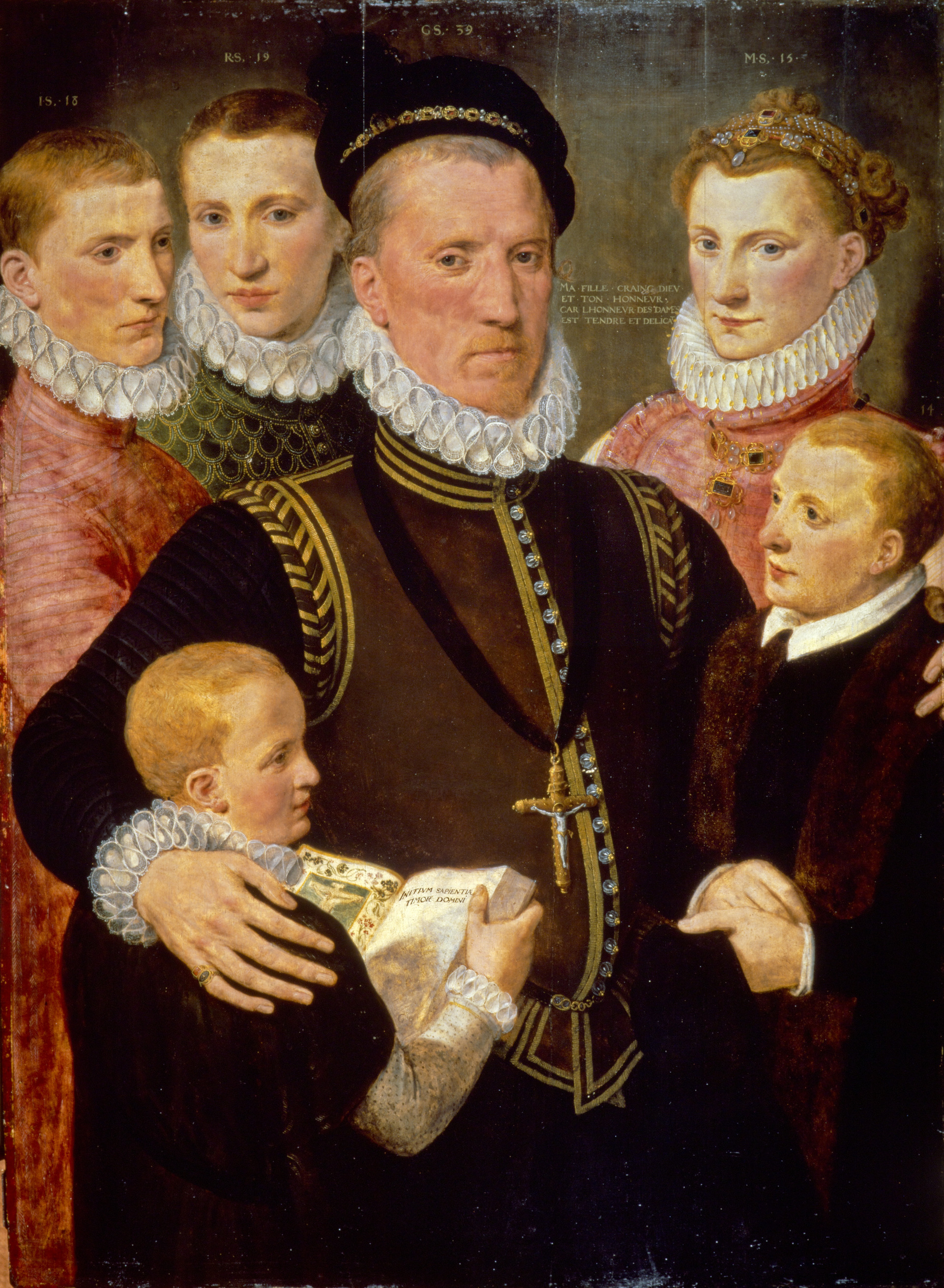
Margaret Seton, his wife

On 1 August 1574 at Niddry Castle, Hamilton married Margaret Seton, the daughter of George Seton, 7th Lord Seton and his wife, Isabel Hamilton. Among her siblings were Robert Seton, 1st Earl of Winton; John Seton of Barnes; Alexander Seton, 1st Earl of Dunfermline; and William Seton, who married Janet Dunbar.

Family tree

Claud Hamilton with wife, parents, and other selected relatives. (Note: This family tree is partly derived from the Abercorn pedigree pictured in Cokayne. Also see the lists of siblings and children in the text.)

James; 1st Earl c. 1475 – 1529	Janet; Bethune
James; 2nd Earl c. 1516 – 1575; Châtellerault	Margaret; Douglas	George; 7th Lord; Seton; 1531–1586
James; 3rd Earl; 1537–1609	John; 1st Marquess; Hamilton; 1540–1604	Claud; 1st Lord; Paisley; 1546–1621	Margaret; Seton d. 1616
James; 1st Earl; 1575–1618	Marion; Boyd d. 1632; Recusant	Claud of Shawfield d. 1614	Frederick; 1590–1647
James; 2nd Earl d. c. 1670	Katherine; 2nd Baroness; Clifton c. 1590 – 1637	Claud; 2nd Baron; H. of Strabane d. 1638	George; 1st Baronet; Donalong c. 1607 – 1679

Legend

XXX	Claud; Hamilton	XXX	Earls of Abercorn	XXX	Earls of Arran	XXX	Marquesses of Hamilton

Claud and Margaret had five sons:

1. James (1575–1618), was created the 1st Earl of Abercorn in 1603
2. John, married Johanna Everard, daughter of Levimus Everard
3. Claud (died 1614), of Shawfield, was appointed to the Privy Council of Ireland, His daughter Margaret married (1) John Stewart of Methven, (2) John Seton of Gargunnock.
4. George (died before 1657) of Greenlaw and Roscrea, married twice and lived at Derrywoon
5. Frederick (1590–1647), served Sweden in the Thirty Years' War and built the castle of Manorhamilton, County Leitrim, Ireland

—and at least one daughter:

1. Margaret (died 1623), married William Douglas, 1st Marquess of Douglas

== Illness and death ==
In 1589 some of his letters were seized and Lord Paisley, as he was now, suffered a short imprisonment, after which he practically disappeared from public life. He suffered from mental illness in his later years. In November 1590 he broke down in tears after reading the Bible and it was thought he would not recover 'in regard of the infirmity haunting and falling on many descended of that house'. His eldest brother James Hamilton, 3rd Earl of Arran, had been suffering from a mental illness since 1562. In 1598 he allowed James, his eldest son, styled the Master of Paisley, to act on his behalf with regard to all the affairs concerning the town. His wife died in March 1616. His son predeceased him in 1618. He died in 1621 and was buried in Paisley Abbey. He was succeeded by his grandson, James Hamilton, 2nd Earl of Abercorn.

Timeline
Age	Date	Event
0	1546	Born, probably in Paisley.
6–7	1553	Made Commendator of Paisley Abbey.
13–14	1560, Mar	Sent to England as hostage for the Treaty of Berwick.
15–16	1562, Apr	Brother James declared insane
20–21	1567, 24 Jul	Accession of King James VI, succeeding Queen Mary
21–22	1568, 2 May	Helped Queen Mary to escape from Lochleven Castle
21–22	1568, 13 May	Fought for Queen Mary in the defeat of Langside.
23–24	1570	Moray, the 1st regent during the infancy of James VI, murdered by James Hamilton of Bothwellhaugh
23–24	1571	Matthew Stewart, 4th Earl of Lennox, the 2nd regent during the infancy of James VI, killed
26–27	1573	Regained his estates.
27–28	1574, 1 Aug	Married Margaret Seton at Niddry Castle.
28–29	1575, 22 Jan	Brother John, the 2nd son succeeded as de facto 3rd Earl of Arran as James, the eldest was insane.
32–33	1579	The privy council decided to arrest John and Claud Hamilton.
33–34	1580	Becomes Catholic.
39–40	1586	Back in Scotland
42–43	1589	Imprisoned
56–57	1603, 24 Mar	Accession of King James I, succeeding Queen Elizabeth I
42–43	1614, 19 Oct	Son Claud died in Dublin
69–70	1616, Mar	Wife died.
74–75	1621	Died.

== Notes and references ==
=== Sources ===
- Bain, Joseph, ed. (1898). Calendar of the State Papers Relating to Scotland and Mary, Queen of Scots 1547–1603. Vol. I. Edinburgh: Her Majesty's General Register House. OCLC 1137227125. – 1547 to 1563
- Boyd, William K., ed. (1907). Calendar of the State Papers Relating to Scotland and Mary, Queen of Scots 1547–1603. Vol. V. Edinburgh: Her Majesty's General Register House. OCLC 1137227125. – 1574 to 1581
- Boyd, William K., ed. (1936). Calendar of the State Papers Relating to Scotland and Mary, Queen of Scots 1547–1603. Vol. X. Edinburgh: Her Majesty's General Register House. OCLC 1137227125. – 1589 to 1593
- Burke, Bernard (1869). A Genealogical and Heraldic Dictionary of the Peerage and Baronetage of the British Empire (31st ed.). London: Harrison. OCLC 1045624502. (for details on his siblings and children)
- Chisholm, Hugh, ed. (1911a). "Hamilton (family)" . Encyclopædia Britannica. Vol. 12 (11th ed.). Cambridge University Press. pp. 878–879.
- Chisholm, Hugh, ed. (1911b). "Paisley, Claud Hamilton, Lord" . Encyclopædia Britannica. Vol. 20 (11th ed.). Cambridge University Press. p. 519.
- Cokayne, George Edward (1910). Gibbs, Vicary (ed.). The complete peerage of England, Scotland, Ireland, Great Britain and the United Kingdom, extant, extinct, or dormant. Vol. I (2nd ed.). London: St Catherine Press. OCLC 228661424. – Ab-Adam to Basing
- Forbes-Leith, William (1889). Narratives of Scottish Catholics under Mary Stuart and James VI (New ed.). London: Thomas Baker. OCLC 457972896.
- Fryde, Edmund Boleslaw; Greenway, D. E.; Porter, S.; Roy, I., eds. (1986). Handbook of British Chronology. Royal Historical Society Guides and Handbooks, No. 2 (3rd ed.). London: Offices of the Royal Historical Society. ISBN 0-86193-106-8. – (for timeline)
- Henderson, Thomas Finlayson (1890). "Hamilton, Claud, Lord Paisley (1543(?)–1622)". In Lee, Sidney (ed.). Dictionary of National Biography. Vol. XXIV. New York: MacMillan and Co. pp. 141–144. OCLC 8544105.
- Holmes, Peter (2004). "Hamilton, Claud, first Lord Paisley (1546?–1621)". In Matthew, Colin; Harrison, Brian (eds.). Oxford Dictionary of National Biography. Vol. 24. New York: Oxford University Press. pp. 776–778. ISBN 0-19-861374-1.
- Lodge, John (1789). Archdall, Mervyn (ed.). The Peerage of Ireland or, A Genealogical History of the Present Nobility of that Kingdom. Vol. V. Dublin: James Moore. OCLC 264906028. – Viscounts
- Metcalfe, William Musham (1909). A History of Paisley. Paisley: Alexander Gardner. OCLC 1046586600.
- Paul, Sir James Balfour (1904). The Scots Peerage, Founded on Wood's Edition of Sir Robert Douglas's Peerage of Scotland. Vol. I. Edinburgh: David Douglas. OCLC 505064285. – Abercorn to Balmerino (for Lord Paisley)
- Paul, Sir James Balfour (1907). The Scots Peerage, Founded on Wood's Edition of Sir Robert Douglas's Peerage of Scotland. Vol. IV. Edinburgh: David Douglas. OCLC 505064285. – Fife to Hyndford (for Hamilton)
- Paul, Sir James Balfour (1911). The Scots Peerage, Founded on Wood's Edition of Sir Robert Douglas's Peerage of Scotland. Vol. VIII. Edinburgh: David Douglas. OCLC 505064285. – Sumerville to Winton (for Seton, earl of Winton)
- Sadler, John (2010). Scottish Battles. Edinburgh: Birlinn Limited. ISBN 978-1-84341-047-8.

Peerage of Scotland
New title	Lord Paisley; 1587–1621	Succeeded by James Hamilton
