= Claud Hamilton of Cochno =

Scottish landowner and Captain of Dumbarton Castle

Claud Hamilton of Cochno was a Scottish landowner and Captain of Dumbarton Castle.

He was a son of Andrew Hamilton of Cochno, captain of Dumbarton Castle and Margaret Noble. Andrew Hamilton's brother was the soldier Robert Hamilton of Briggis, Captain of Linlithgow Palace and Dunbar Castle.

Cochno is in Faifley, and is known for the Cochno Stone. The family were supporters of Mary, Queen of Scots, and in 1568 Regent Moray and Lord Sempill took possession of the House of Cochno.

His father died in 1573 and his older brother John Hamilton inherited, then after his death Cochno came to Claud Hamilton. He was also Captain of Dumbarton Castle from 1590 to 1596.

In February 1597 he complained about a neighbour to the Privy Council. John Menteith in Lettir, whose father rented his lands from David Haldane, Tutor of Gleneagles, with other neighbours, had stolen oxen grazing on the Muir of Cochno which belonged to Claud Hamilton and his tenants.

Alexander Seton, 1st Earl of Dunfermline wrote in 1621 that he knew "Claud of the Cochno", father of the Minister of Paisley, and he was a very honest man. Seton was the feudal landlord of Wester Cochno.

== Marriage and children ==
Some older sources state that his wife was Margaret Edmondstone of Duntreath, but he married Margaret Beaton, a daughter of Robert Beaton of Creich. His children included:

- William Hamilton of Cochno
- Claud Hamilton of Craigleith, who married Marjory Edmondstone of Duntreath. He may be the same person as a man described as Claud Hamilton of the Fort of Toome.
- Archibald Hamilton, minister of Paisley and Archbishop of Cashel, who is thought to have married Alison Hay, who was a nurse of Princess Elizabeth at Linlithgow Palace.
