= Charles Seton, 2nd Earl of Dunfermline =

Scottish peer

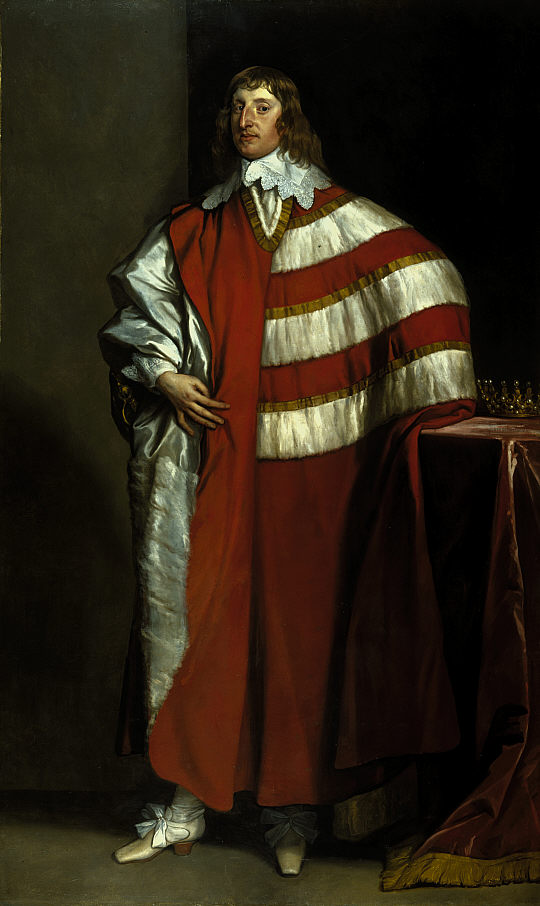
The Earl of Dunfermline.

Charles Seton, 2nd Earl of Dunfermline PC (November 1615 – 11 May 1672), styled Lord Fyvie until the death of his father in 1622, was a Scottish peer.

Seton the son of Alexander Seton, 1st Earl of Dunfermline and Margaret, daughter of James Hay, 7th Lord Hay of Yester and Lady Margaret Kerr. Charles was a Royalist during the Civil War, and was forced to flee the country when Charles I was executed in 1649, only to return with Charles II the next year. He held the post of Keeper of the Privy Seal of Scotland from 1661 to his death in 1672.

Lord Dunfermline was married to Mary Douglas, daughter of William Douglas, 7th Earl of Morton and Anne Keith, daughter of George Keith, 5th Earl Marischal. She became a friend of Anne Halkett in 1650 and introduced her to King Charles at Dunfermline Palace, and travelled with her from Perth to Glamis, Brechin and Fyvie Castle.

At his death in 1672, his two sons, Alexander Seton, 3rd Earl of Dunfermline and James Seton, 4th Earl of Dunfermline succeeded him in turn. Both died without issue, and the title became extinct when James was outlawed in 1690.

Political offices
Preceded by The Earl Marischal	Keeper of the Privy Seal of Scotland; 1661–1672	Succeeded by The Earl of Atholl
Peerage of Scotland
Preceded by Alexander Seton	Earl of Dunfermline; 1622–1672	Succeeded by Alexander Seton
