= William Danielstoun =

Scottish keeper

William Danielstoun or Dennestoun was keeper of Linlithgow Palace for James V of Scotland.

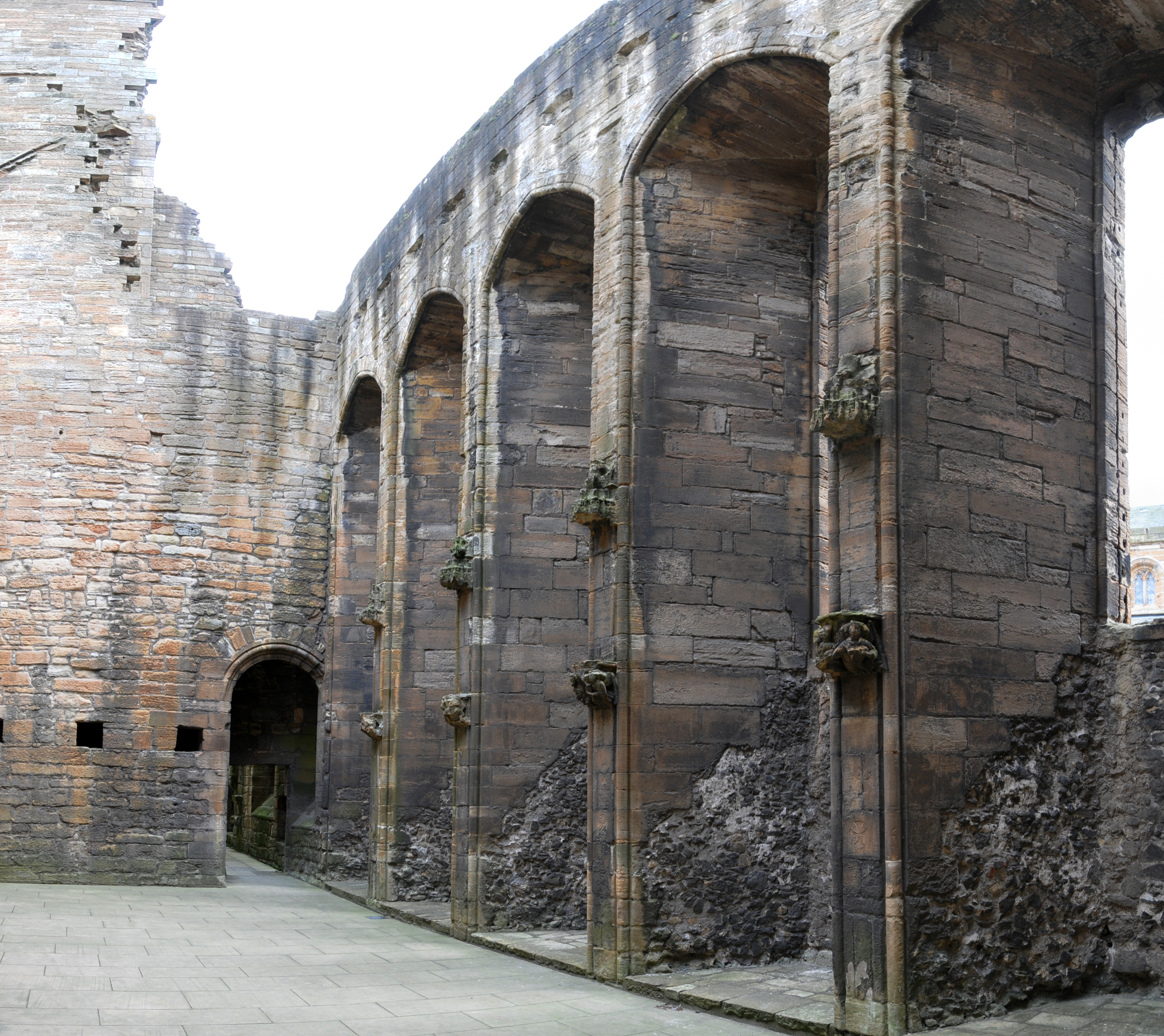
Danielstoun completed the roof of the chapel at Linlithgow Palace

Danielstoun was made keeper of Linlithgow Palace on 19 November 1540, replacing Thomas Johnston. His annual fee was £50 Scots.

He was a Bailie of Linlithgow and Sheriff-depute of Linlithgowshire. He found some gold coins in Linlithgow in 1540. James V granted him lands in Linlithgow on 6 December 1542, presumably rewarding him for his work at the palace for his wife. This was one of the last grants made by the king before his death.

Thomas Johnson had been supervising repair works at the palace. In April 1541, Danielstoun was paid for bringing timber to prop up the north quarter of the palace. This part of the building eventually collapsed in 1607. Danielstoun completed some of the palace chimneys and re-roofed the chapel.

Mary of Guise came to the palace for her confinement when pregnant with Mary, Queen of Scots and remained at Linlithgow until July 1543 when she moved to Stirling Castle. Details of her household at Linlithgow were recorded in the Latin household books of Regent Arran and the French records of the queen's household, including an allowance of coal and soap for her linen laundress Margaret Balcomie, repairs to make the fountain flow in June 1543, and furnishings packed for the move to Stirling.

After Mary, Queen of Scots, left the palace, Regent Arran made Matthew Hamilton, and then Robert Hamilton of Briggis, Keeper and Captain of Linlithgow Palace in August 1543.

He had a son, James.

== John Danielstoun, Parson of Dysart ==
His brother, John Danielstoun, was Parson of Dysart. He signed an audit of an account of royal income in 1538. After the death of James V, the wardrobe servant John Tennent delivered pictures from the royal collection to John Danielstoun on the orders of Regent Arran. The pictures taken by Danielstoun included Adam and Eve and other unspecified subjects. Danielstoun left behind a picture of Our Lady worked in silk and gold, and a picture of Lucretia.

Robert Danielstoun, Parson of Dysart (1551–1573) wrote an inscription in a book now held by the University of Aberdeen, "Robertus Danyelston a Dysert et amicorum. Spes fove". The motto "spes fove" was used by one of the clerks writing the household accounts of James V.
