= Alexander Seton, 3rd Earl of Dunfermline =

Alexander Seton, 3rd Earl of Dunfermline (12 June 1642 – btw. 23 August/27 October 1677) was an Earl in the Peerage of Scotland. He succeeded his father, Charles Seton, 2nd Earl of Dunfermline, in 1672. Alexander was a younger son, but his older brother Charles had predeceased his father shortly before, in a naval battle of the Third Anglo-Dutch War. As a peer, he was entitled to sit in the Parliament of Scotland. He had no children, and upon his death in 1677 the title went to his brother, James Seton, 4th Earl of Dunfermline. The title became extinct with James, who was outlawed in 1690 after fighting in the Battle of Killiecrankie, and died without heirs in 1694.

Peerage of Scotland
Preceded by Charles Seton	Earl of Dunfermline; 1672–1677	Succeeded by James Seton
