= James Seton, 4th Earl of Dunfermline =

Scottish peer

James Seton, 4th Earl of Dunfermline (died 26 December 1694) was a Scottish peer.

James Seton was a younger son of Charles Seton, 2nd Earl of Dunfermline, and succeeded to the title at the death of his brother, Alexander Seton, 3rd Earl of Dunfermline, in 1677. He married Lady Jean Gordon, daughter of Lewis Gordon, 3rd Marquess of Huntly and Mary Grant, in 1682.

Like his father, James was a Jacobite, and he joined the rising led by Viscount Dundee in 1689. James was Dundee's cavalry commander for most of the rising, and he led a troop at the Battle of Killiecrankie in July 1689. After Dundee's death at the battle, James stayed with the rising as one of its senior figures until mid-1690. In the same year, he was outlawed and forfeited his estates and title. He then joined the deposed James VII at St. Germains, who conferred on him the Order of the Thistle. In 1694 James Seton died with no issue, thereby ending the earldom of Dunfermline. His prominent role in the 1689 rising, as an Earl and a member of the Scottish Privy Council, helps to disprove claims by some historians that Viscount Dundee's rising attracted no noble support other than Dundee himself.

Peerage of Scotland
Preceded by Alexander Seton	Earl of Dunfermline; 1677–1690	Forfeit
