= John Seton, Lord Barns =

John Seton, Lord Barns (Born 1553. died 1594) was a Scottish diplomat, courtier and judge.

== Life ==
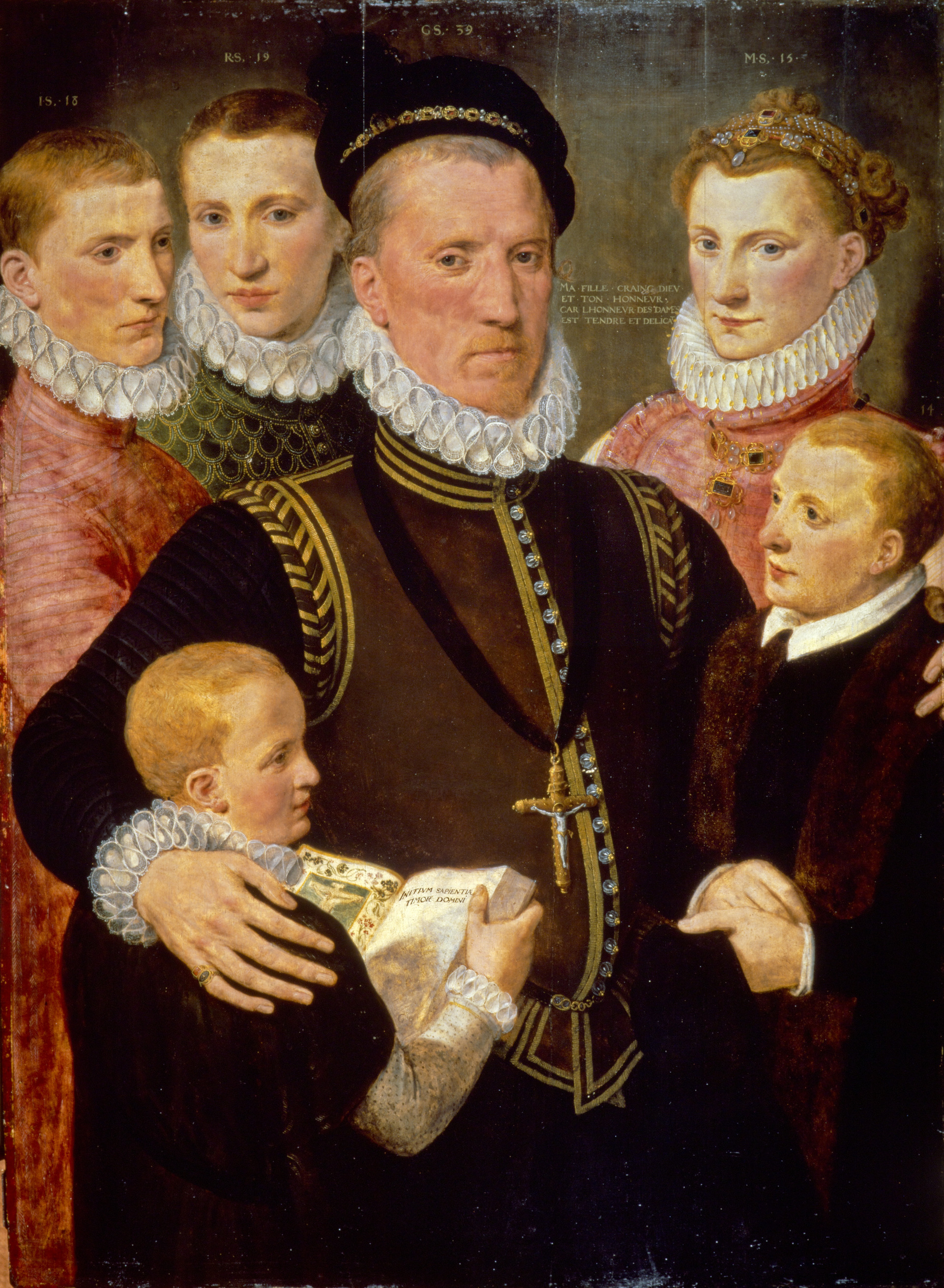
George, Lord Seton and his children in 1572, including Margaret, Lady Paisley, Robert, Earl of Winton, Sir John Seton of Barns and Alexander, Earl of Dunfermline

He was the third son of George Seton, 7th Lord Seton, by his wife Isabel, daughter of Sir William Hamilton of Sanquhar. While still a young man he went to Spain and the court of Philip II, by whom he was made Knight of the Military Order of Santiago and master of the household.

He was an attendant to the Earl of Leicester in England in 1575. Francis Walsingham found his presence in the earl's household concerning, and Thomas Randolph wrote to Regent Morton about him.

Seton was appointed master of the stable to James VI of Scotland and Great Master of His Highness' Horses in August 1581. At the same time Esmé Stewart, 1st Duke of Lennox was made Master of Wardrobe. Only these two officers were allowed to order clothes for pages and lackeys.

The Seton family were supporters of Mary, Queen of Scots and their politics were not aligned with England. On 14 February 1581 Mark Kerr met the English diplomat Thomas Randolph in Edinburgh and asked for a safe-conduct, a travel document, for Lord Seton to go the English court. Randolph refused, as Seton's politics had not previously favoured England, and Kerr took his answer to the king. John Seton then came to Randolph with the same request. Subsequently, John Seton was sent as ambassador to complain to Elizabeth I of England regarding her conduct in interfering on behalf of James Douglas, 4th Earl of Morton, but was not permitted to enter England.

He had an argument at court with James Stewart, Earl of Arran and the Seton family were told to leave court and stay at Seton Palace in December 1581. According to David Hume of Godscroft, the king was ready to go riding to Parliament when the courtiers were asked left him alone to speak to Arran in private. Seton, as master of the horse stayed, which angered Arran, who made to throw his baton of office at him, and the royal guard hustled him downstairs.

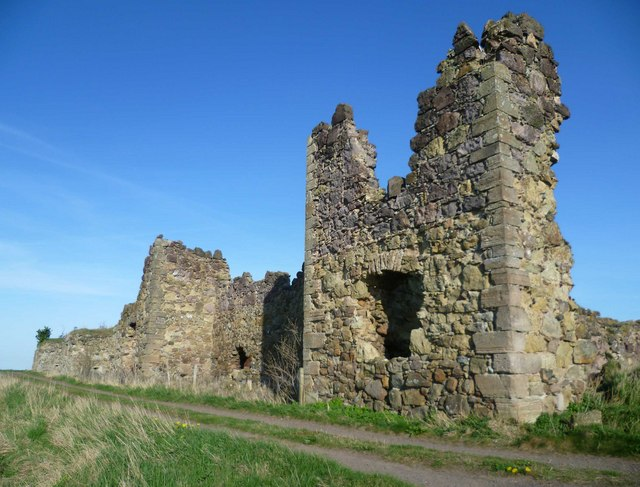
Seton built Barnes Castle

John Seton went abroad. In April 1584 the English ambassador heard various rumours of his return or demise, that he had arrived Dumbarton and was secretly in Edinburgh's Canongate and had met the king at Seton Palace, or that he had sea-sickness in the Irish sea, landed on the Isle of Man, and his ship had at Kirkcudbright by some accident without him, and he was dead. In a ciphered letter of April 1586 to Mary, Queen of Scots, Albert Fontenay mentioned John Seton, "le chevalier maistre d'hostel du roy", as one of her Catholic allies in Scotland.

On 27 January 1587 he was admitted a member of the Privy Council. He was first master of the king's household and made a contract with the Comptroller of Scotland which outlines the duties and financial responsibilities of the role.On 17 February 1588 he was appointed, with the title Lord Barns, an extraordinary lord of session, in the place of his brother Alexander Seton.

Seton died on 25 May 1594. His castle at Barnes Castle was uncompleted at his death.

The poet William Fowler, who was secretary to the queen Anne of Denmark wrote an epitaph for John Seton which was printed as a broadsheet.

== Family ==
Seton married Anne, daughter of William Forbes, 7th Lord Forbes, on 8 September 1588 at Lord Ogilvie's house, "Boyshan", in Angus.

Seton had, with other children, a son John who succeeded him. John married Margaret Hay, a daughter of Francis Hay, 9th Earl of Erroll and Elizabeth Douglas, Countess of Erroll. Another son was Hannibal Seton.

== Notes ==
Attribution

This article incorporates text from a publication now in the public domain: Lee, Sidney, ed. (1897). "Seton, John (d.1594)". Dictionary of National Biography. Vol. 51. London: Smith, Elder & Co.
