= George Seton, 7th Lord Seton =

Lord of the Parliament of Scotland (c. 1530 – 1586)

The Right Honourable The Lord Seton
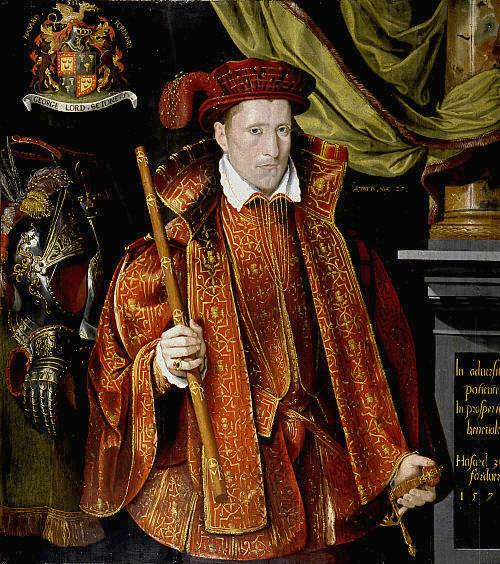
- Portrait of George Seton, c. 1570

Ambassador to France
- In office December 1583 – July 1585

Master of the Household of Mary, Queen of Scots
- In office 1563–1568

Provost of Edinburgh
- In office 1557–1559

Personal details
- Born: 1531
- Died: 1586 (aged 54–55) France
- Resting place: Seton Collegiate Church, Scotland
- Spouse: Isobel Hamilton
- Children: 6, including Robert

George Seton, 7th Lord Seton (1531–1586) was a Scottish Lord of Parliament, Master of the Household of Mary, Queen of Scots, and Provost of Edinburgh. He was the eldest son of George Seton, 6th Lord Seton, and Elizabeth Hay, a daughter of John Hay, 3rd Lord Hay of Yester. His childhood and schooling were in France.

== Political career ==
=== Edinburgh and the Reformation ===
George Seton was Provost of Edinburgh in 1557, and from time to time would send his carpenter, Robert Fendour or Fender, to the Burgh Council as his representative. In February 1558, George Seton was one of eight commissioners sent to Henry II of France to negotiate the marriage of Mary, Queen of Scots, to the Dauphin. On 29 November 1558, the Parliament of Scotland acknowledged that Seton and the others had fulfilled their commission. In February 1559, the town council gave him funds to prepare a banquet for Mary of Guise on their behalf.

However, Seton and the burgh council began to encounter difficulties, due only in part to the Scottish Reformation. After rioting in Perth, Edinburgh was occupied by the Protestant Lords of the Congregation in June 1559. Seton tried unsuccessfully to protect the Blackfriars and Greyfriars monasteries. The Protestant Lords left Edinburgh in July, but made an agreement with Guise permitting freedom of conscience in religion. Seton, the Earl of Huntly and Châtellerault were asked to meet the people of Edinburgh to discuss the restoration of Mass in St Giles. According to John Knox, they met with refusal and the people would not allow the Mass in any other church. By the time the Lords of the Congregation occupied Edinburgh for the second time in October 1559, another rival council had already formed, led by Archibald Douglas of Kilspindie. The Protestant lords retreated and Seton's council was re-instated. When the English army mobilised by the Treaty of Berwick arrived in April 1560, Kilspindie's council was back in power.

During the Siege of Leith in 1560, Seton fought for Mary of Guise against the Scottish Protestants and the English army. On 24 April he attacked the English camp at Restalrig. He was seized by an English cavalryman who broke his sword and staff, but was rescued by French musketeers. After the treaty of Edinburgh concluded the fighting, Seton sailed to France with the evacuees aboard the Mynyon.

=== Mary's portrait ===
In Paris in October 1560, he secretly met the English ambassador, Nicholas Throckmorton, asking him for a passport to return to Scotland through England. He managed to convince Throckmorton that he regretted his service to Mary of Guise and French causes. Seton had gained a French pension as a gentleman of the King's Chamber. He intended to take a portrait of Queen Mary and her letter to Elizabeth I, but Mary said the picture was not ready. After a delay of a few days, Seton left France in November 1560 (presumably with the finished portrait), accompanied by an archer of the Scottish Guard called Alexander Clark, whose loyalty Throckmorton thought he had bought.

=== Mary in Scotland ===
During the personal reign of Mary in Scotland George had a loyal inscription set in large carved letters and gilded above the entrance to Seton Palace;

"UN DIEU, UN FOY, UN ROY, UN LOY"
One God for all time: One loyalty to the monarch.

Lord Seton had dies made by the Edinburgh goldsmith Michael Gilbert to strike gold and silver medals with the same motto, and a monogram with his initials and those of his wife, Isobel Hamilton, "GS-IH," with another motto "Nemo Potest Duobus Dominus Servire," from Matthew 6:24, "No one can serve two masters."

Mary was unsuccessful in proposing Seton as Provost of Edinburgh again in October 1561. Next year she made a better choice by backing Archibald Douglas (II) of Kilspindie, now associated with the success of the Reformation.

In March 1565, Seton fought a duel with Francis Douglas who was badly injured. The Earl of Morton and the Laird of Lethington tried to take legal action so Seton went to France. Thomas Randolph, the English diplomat, heard that Mary and Lord Darnley went to Seton Palace and were "bedded" after their marriage at Holyroodhouse. Seton returned to Scotland in October 1565, during the Chaseabout Raid. He carried arms from France for Queen Mary. An English ship, the Aid tried to blockade Leith to prevent him docking, but was repulsed. Seton's cargo included three great horses for Darnley.

The French ambassador, Jean, Count de Brienne, arrived in Edinburgh on 2 November 1566 and was lodged in Henry Kinloch's house in the Canongate near Holyrood Palace. He went to Stirling Castle for the baptism of Prince James on 12 December, escorted by Lord Seton.

Days after the death of Lord Darnley, on 17 February 1567, Mary had a blue costume for her fool called George Steven delivered to her at Seton Palace, in April she was there with her council. With other supporters of Mary's marriage to James Hepburn, 4th Earl of Bothwell Seton signed the Ainslie Tavern Bond on 19 April 1567.

Mary's marriage to Bothwell and continued rule in Scotland was opposed by the Confederate Lords. She stayed at Seton Palace before her capture nearby at the battle of Carberry Hill. She was then imprisoned at Lochleven Castle. She escaped to Seton's castle at Niddry but her supporters were defeated again at the battle of Langside. Seton was taken prisoner and early reports thought him killed. The son of Lord Ochiltree, John Knox's brother-in-law, would have killed him in revenge for his father's injury, but he yielded and was saved by James Stewart, 1st Earl of Moray.

Queen Mary went into England, where her companion, Seton's half-sister Mary Seton joined her. With the other Marian lords Seton was imprisoned in Edinburgh Castle where Mary was worried that he was at risk from plague. Seton was finally allowed to go into exile in France. Elizabeth I of England sent him a passport on 1 June 1569.

=== Supporter of the exiled queen ===
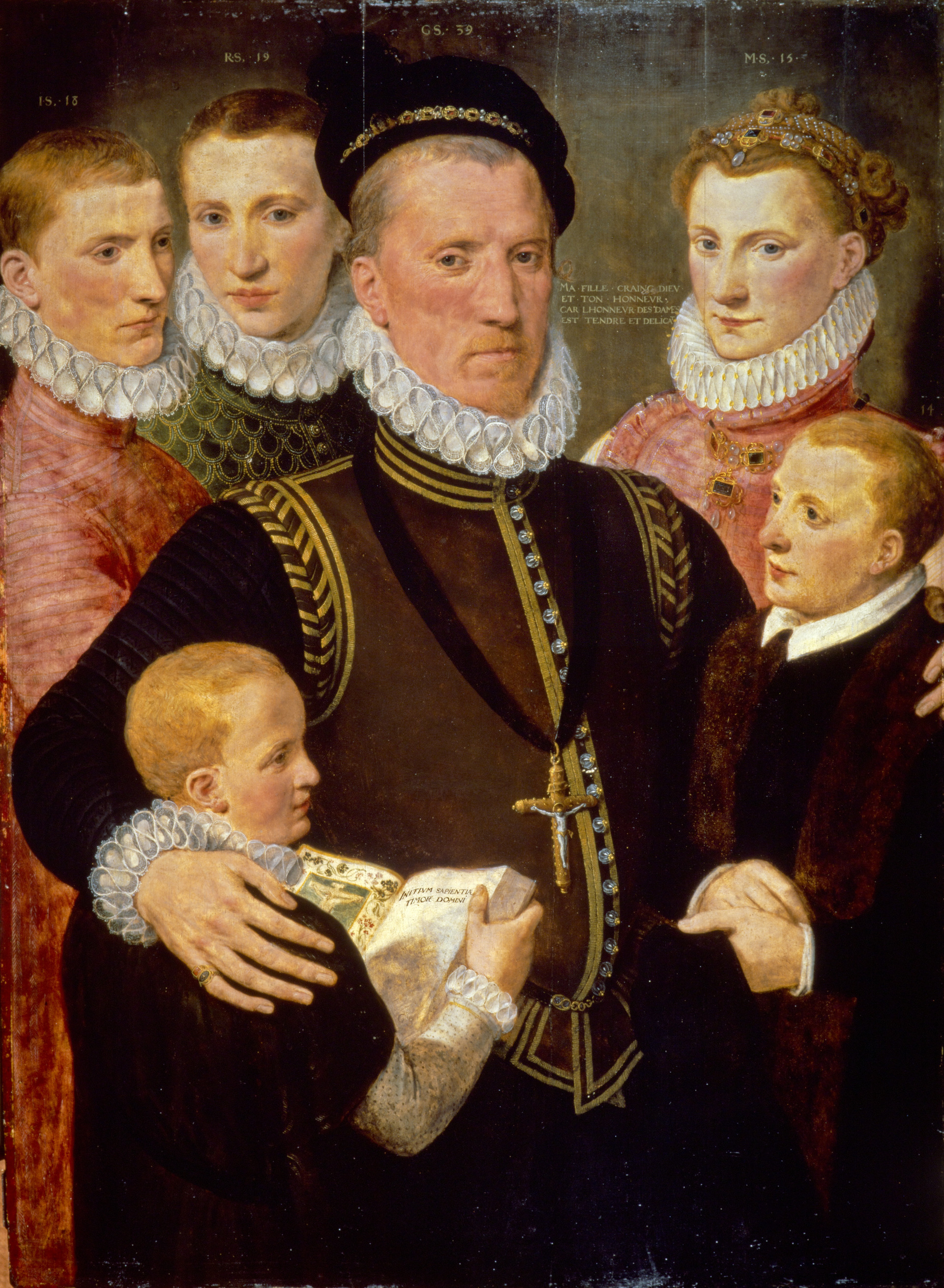
George, Lord Seton, and his family, painted 1572 by Frans Pourbus the Elder while Seton was in the Spanish Netherlands.

Three Scottish supporters of Mary, the Duke of Châtellerault, the Earl of Huntly and Earl of Argyll gave Seton a commission to treat with the Duke of Alba, Viceroy of Lower Germany, as Mary's ambassador in August 1570. Seton was to ask for Spanish help to re-instate Mary in Scotland and expel her son's supporters who depended on English power. Alba would send money to Sir William Kirkcaldy of Grange to continue holding Edinburgh Castle for Mary. In September 1570, Lord Morley met him in the household of Anne Percy, Countess of Northumberland at Bruges. Seton told Morley that he had come to escort the Countess, who had previously sought refuge in Scotland, into France. The author of the Historie and Life of James the Sext, recorded what must have been a popular account of the mission to the Duke of Alba. Seton tried to convince Alba to provide an army of 10,000 men by persuading the Scottish soldiers fighting against Spain to change sides. The soldiers were unresponsive until Seton himself was captured and tortured on the rack. The soldiers then mutinied only till he was released. There was an offer of money, but Alba could not spare the men, and Seton's mission was unsuccessful. Meanwhile in Scotland, the goods of his French stepmother, Marie Pieris, and half-brother Robert Seton were seized by Regent Moray's officers.

In January 1572, Seton was in the Spanish Netherlands with the Duke of Alba and still in contact with the Countess of Northumberland. Seton's return to Scotland through England prompted thorough searches of Scottish shipping in English waters. In April 1572, the Marshall of Berwick upon Tweed, Sir William Drury, plotted with Mr Archibald Douglas to kidnap Seton on his return from the shore at Leith at night and take him to England, but the plan did not take effect after Douglas was arrested by Regent Mar.

An Italian called Battista di Trento wrote a long letter to Elizabeth I of England in 1577, which alleged to reveal a plot some years earlier involving Seton and his sons, including Alexander, then a student in Rome. As part of the Ridolfi Plot, Mary would have married the Duke of Norfolk and be restored to the Scottish throne. Seton would pay to secure Edinburgh Castle on her behalf. Elizabeth would marry the Earl of Leicester. Battista laid out five schemes for the plot and the 19th century editor of William Cecil's papers believed his circumstantial details to show some "sub-stratum of truth" in his statements.

In May 1579, during the suppression of the Hamilton family, Lord Seton and three of his sons were ordered to enter ward at Brechin Castle. Seton pleaded with the King's keepers at Stirling Castle to mitigate their charge of treason. His son John Seton of Barnes, known as the 'Cavalier de Bucca' from his post at the Spanish court, had returned to Scotland and was suspected to have brought messages from the exiled Queen Mary. On 2 June 1581, Seton and two of his sons watched the execution of Regent Morton from a forestair on the Royal Mile of Edinburgh.

=== Ambassador in France, 1583 ===
After the collapse of the Gowrie Regime, Seton was sent as ambassador to France in December 1583. He was accompanied by William Schaw, Master of Works to James VI of Scotland. An English observer heard that the young Laird of Fintry, a Catholic, would accompany them to escape his excommunication from the Church of Scotland, and the Master of Livingston would go to bring Catherine, Duchess of Lennox, widow of Esmé Stewart, and her son Ludovic back to Scotland. A French diplomat, François de Rocherolles, Seigneur de Maineville, according to Sir Robert Bowes, was behind the mission and the choice of Lord Seton.

When he was selected for this embassy in September 1583, Seton wrote to Queen Mary from Seton Palace to explain his mission. He said he was to continue the league and amity with France, follow the advice of the Duke of Guise, and complete the treaty with her and her son (a plan for her return to Scotland in joint rule known as the "association"). Seton wrote that Mary's service was his principal motive. He explained that the poverty of King James was "so great that he could not carry out the least part of his plans". Seton had to pay for the voyage himself. He also mentioned that the English envoy Francis Walsingham had left Scotland on 15 (or 25) September 1583, and had a very poor reception and entertainment in Scotland. Seton was funded in part by the town of Edinburgh, who gave him a commercial mandate and contributed 2000 marks to hiring of Andrew Lamb's ship.

The Scottish embassy was keenly observed by the English diplomat, Sir Edward Stafford. Stafford noted Seton's audience with the French king in February 1584, supported by the Dukes of Guise and Joyeuse. Stafford said that Seton was lavish in his entertainment and display of silver plate, which resulted in a suspicion that he was funded by Spain. He thought that Seton's mission concerned a marriage for James VI to the Princess of Lorraine. By May 1584, Seton had run out of money and pawned his silver plate and the guns of the ship at Dieppe. Seton asked Stafford about the rebel leaders of the Raid of Ruthven who had fled into England, and Stafford wrote to Francis Walsingham that Seton was foolish in this conversation.

On 21 June 1584, Stafford remarked in another letter that Seton's phrases echoed those of Mary, Queen of Scots, and it was clear the two maintained frequent communication. James VI wrote to Mary in July, encouraged by her envoy Fontenay, anticipating Seton's return. After Seton's return to Scotland, de Maineville wrote to James VI in November 1584 that Seton had been earnest in this embassy (to reconcile Mary and James VI), but the time was not right. Primarily, France was anxious to maintain good relations with England.

== Death and epitaph ==
Seton remained in France till July 1585 or later. The Jesuit Robert Parsons wrote that he was uncertain whether to return or just send his son Alexander back to Scotland. (Although the ultra-Protestant Gowrie Regime was defeated, the political situation in Scotland was not as Seton had hoped) Back in Scotland, in January Sir John Colville twice noted him as ill in his letters, and he died in February 1586. On 22 June 1586, his son Alexander, Prior of Pluscarden, returned to Edinburgh council copies of their papers regarding French import duties sent with George to Henry II. George was buried at Seton Collegiate Church and his memorial has a lengthy Latin epitaph which also describes his children's careers. The Latin text is signed 'A.S.F.C.F.F.,' presumably referring to Alexander Seton as its author.

== Family ==
He married Isobel Hamilton (died 1604), daughter of Sir William Hamilton of Sanquhar, Captain of Edinburgh Castle in August 1550. The wedding was celebrated with a feast at Edinburgh Castle. According to Richard Maitland, Hamilton of Sanquhar organised some of the rebuilding of Seton Palace, which had been damaged by the English army that burnt Edinburgh in May 1544.

The children of Lord Seton and Isobel Hamilton included;

1. George, Master of Seton, (died 1562)
2. Robert Seton, 1st Earl of Winton
3. Sir John Seton of Barnes, attendant to the Earl of Leicester in 1575, Master Carver to Philip II of Spain and Master of Horse to James VI.
4. Alexander Seton, 1st Earl of Dunfermline, Lord Urquhart, Lord Fyvie, and Prior of Pluscarden
5. William Seton of Kylesmure, who married Janet Dunbar
6. Margaret Seton, who married Claud Hamilton, 1st Lord Paisley, on 1 August 1574 at Niddry Castle with "great triumphs."

Isobel Hamilton was invited to wait on Anne of Denmark at her coronation in May 1590. According to a Spanish diplomatic report, in 1592 Anne of Denmark told several ladies at court, including Isobel Hamilton, Lady Seton, that she was a Catholic and prayed with a rosary. In December 1596 Lady Seton was said to be a great favourite of Anne of Denmark.

== Lord Seton's painter ==
An anonymous portrait of Lord Seton was kept by the family of Hugh Somerville, 7th Lord Somerville, and is now part of the collection of the Scottish National Portrait Gallery. It shows him with his baton of office as Master of Queen Mary's household, and may have been a commemorative piece made in later decades. The picture is reduced in size and the last figure of a date "157-" is missing. A motto on this painting, "in adversity, unyielding; in prosperity generous," matches an inscription recorded under a version of the painting at Seton Palace by Alexander Seton, 1st Viscount of Kingston; "In adversity patiens; in prosperitie, benevolus; Hazard yet forward." This portrait has been attributed to Adrian Vanson. In January 1582, a painter in his employ, "Lord Seton's painter", was paid for drawing the King's portrait for coinage. This painter may perhaps have been Adrian Vanson or Arnold Bronckorst, who were both portrait painters to James VI, or a third individual. Seton was also painted in a family group by Frans Pourbus the Elder, now in the National Gallery of Scotland.

The 18th century heraldic writer Alexander Nisbet described some of his additions to the interior of Seton Palace. Above the fireplace in the Great Hall were carved his coat of arms quartered with the Earl of Buchan encircled with a collar which Nisbet claimed to represent the Order of the Thistle. The ceiling of another room, called Samson's Hall, incorporated 28 armorial achievements of families of France, Scotland and Lorraine, "curiously embossed and illuminated." Viscount Kingston mentions seeing a mural painting on the end wall of the Long Gallery at Seton Palace, which he believed showed Lord Seton driving a wagon during his years of exile in France following the abdication of Mary, Queen of Scots.

Peerage of Scotland
Preceded by George Seton	Lord Seton; 1549–1586	Succeeded by Robert Seton
