= Robert Hamilton of Briggis =

Scottish soldier and military engineer

Robert Hamilton of Briggis (died 1568) was a Scottish soldier and military engineer. He was keeper of Linlithgow Palace and Dunbar Castle and was Master of the Scottish artillery.

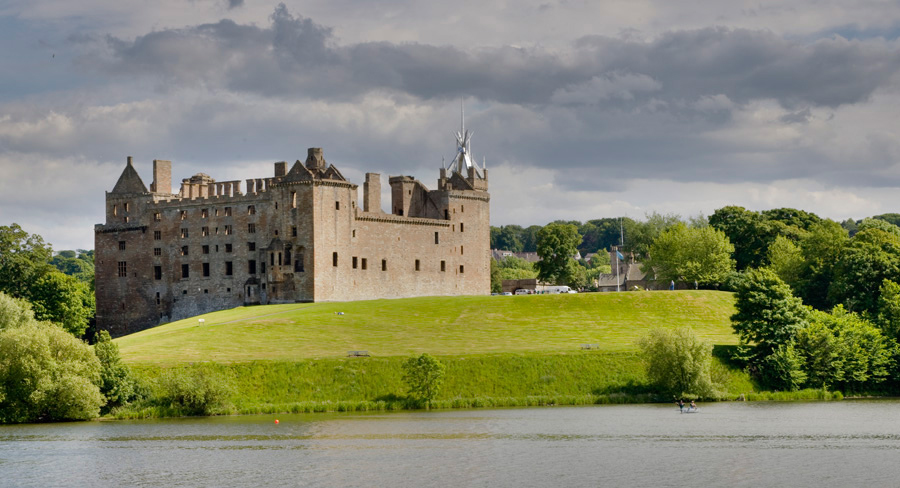
Robert Hamilton was Captain of Linlithgow Palace

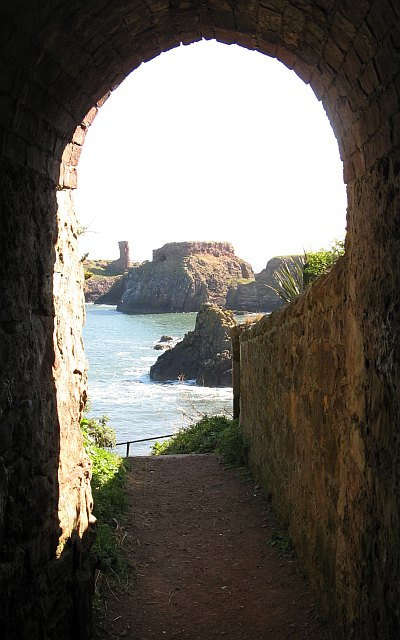
Robert Hamilton was Captain of Dunbar Castle

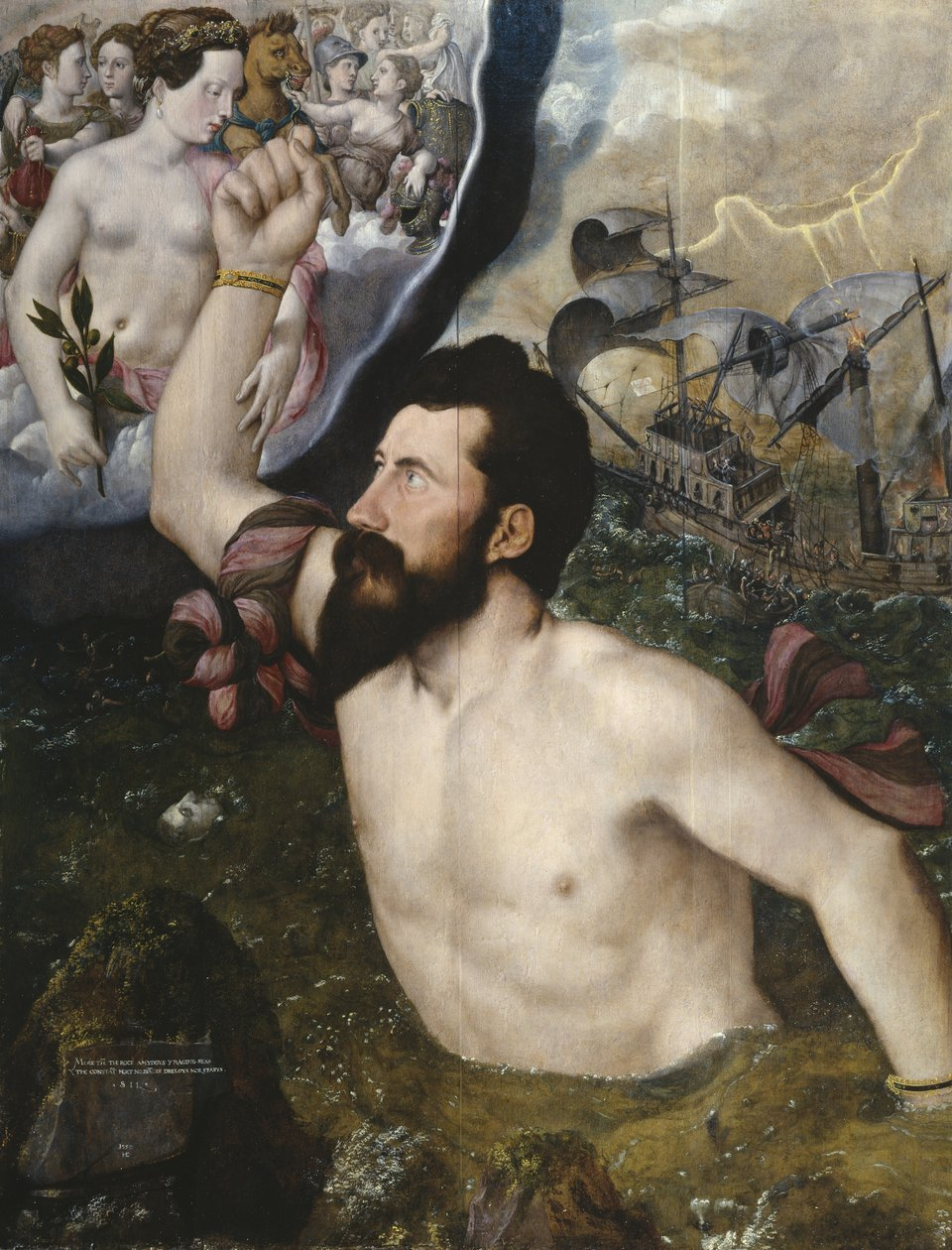
Hamilton built siege works at Broughty Castle against John Luttrell

== Lands ==
Briggis was an estate at Kirkliston near the Almond Water a West Lothian river and the Gogar Burn. The ancient monument called the Cat Stane is on this ground. Hamilton held the lands of Easter Briggis from Lord Torphichen, not directly from the crown, and so was sometimes called "Robert Hamilton in Briggis". In 1561 Hamilton was exempted from paying teinds.

Robert Hamilton also gained lands at Easter Collessie or Halhill in Fife. He was a brother of Andrew Hamilton of Cochno, governor of Dumbarton Castle.

== Career ==
In February 1542 James V of Scotland sent Robert Hamilton and Matthew Hamilton of Milnburn to France. They were allowed to return by Regent Arran in January 1543.

On 22 August 1543 he was made Keeper and Captain of Linlithgow Palace, with its gardens, tennis court, and eel-trap. This was after the infant Mary, Queen of Scots was taken from Linlithgow to Stirling Castle. The previous keeper was William Danielstoun. In March 1554 Hamilton was given a specific charter to work the coal pit at Linlithgow.

He was also captain of Dalkeith Castle in February 1544. He fought with the Earl of Lennox and the Earl of Glencairn against Regent Arran at the battle of Glasgow Moor in March or May 1544.

He was quickly reconciled with Regent Arran. In August 1545 he was a commissioner with Lord Seton or Lord Borthwick for a cavalry force of 1000 men to defend the English border. John Scrimgeour of Myres was the paymaster. In March 1546 he went to Dupplin wood with the carpenter James Crawford to cut timber to mount the guns at Dunbar. In September 1546 he brought artillery to besiege Lennox at Dumbarton Castle.

He was involved in the siege of St Andrews Castle in December 1546 where he spent at least £3756 Scots on the artillery and workmen. He was Captain of Dunbar Castle and directed repairs there in 1547, during the war known as the Rough Wooing. In September 1547 he resigned his role at Dunbar to John Bonkill, Chamberlain of St Andrews, and Alexander Forus, and a new Captain, William Hamilton of Humbie. Dunbar was transferred to the French commander Monsieur La Chapelle in June 1548. Hamilton seems to have been in charge of the Scottish artillery at the battle of Pinkie.

One of his sons, also named Robert Hamilton, hauled the cannon called "thrawyn-mouth" from Dunbar Castle to the siege of Haddington in July 1548.

In February 1550 he was at the siege of Broughty Castle which was held by the English soldier John Luttrell. Hamilton gave 10 gold crowns to John Dodds and Anthony Kennedy, the leaders of the pioneers digging siegeworks for French guns.

In 1551 Regent Arran rewarded him and William Hamilton of Humbie, his successor at Dunbar, with the sums of money owed by the tailor Thomas Arthur to James V.

In December 1552, Regent Arran sent him worsted cloth and velvet for a gown for Elizabeth Ramsay, the daughter of William Ramsay of Leuchars and Colluthie. Her father had been killed at the battle of Pinkie, and she was probably staying at Linlithgow Palace at this time. She subsequently married David Carnegie. He was also sent money to give to two banished Englishmen.

In November 1554, Mary of Guise (who was now Regent of Scotland) give him a lease or tack of the coal workings near Linlithgow Palace. On 10 February 1556, she made him master of her majesty's artillery and munitions. His letter of appointment mentions his faithful service in the wars with "the auld enemies of England" and his experience of fortifications and munitions. He was given powers to survey fortifications and order repairs. The position paid £100 Scots.

During the six years of her Regency (1554–1560), Mary of Guise employed an Italian military designer, Lorenzo Pomarelli from Siena who is particularly associated with works on the Island of Inchkeith.

Hamilton of Briggis was chamberlain of the lands of Dunbar. His account for 1561 mentions rabbits, local produce that featured on the royal table.

In July 1561 Mary, Queen of Scots made Robert Anstruther captain of Dunbar. He took charge of the cannons and ammunition according to an inventory made by Robert Hamilton of Briggs.

Queen Mary appointed Andrew Ferriar keeper of Linlithgow Palace on 28 January 1567. He was instructed to keep some fields of broom in the park to feed the queen's mares, and plant trees in the Peel, the environs of the palace. He was also given powers to apprehend anyone hunting with dogs or culverin hand-guns in the park.

Robert Hamilton of Briggis died in 1568. He had at least four children.
