= Earl of Dunfermline =

Scottish peerage

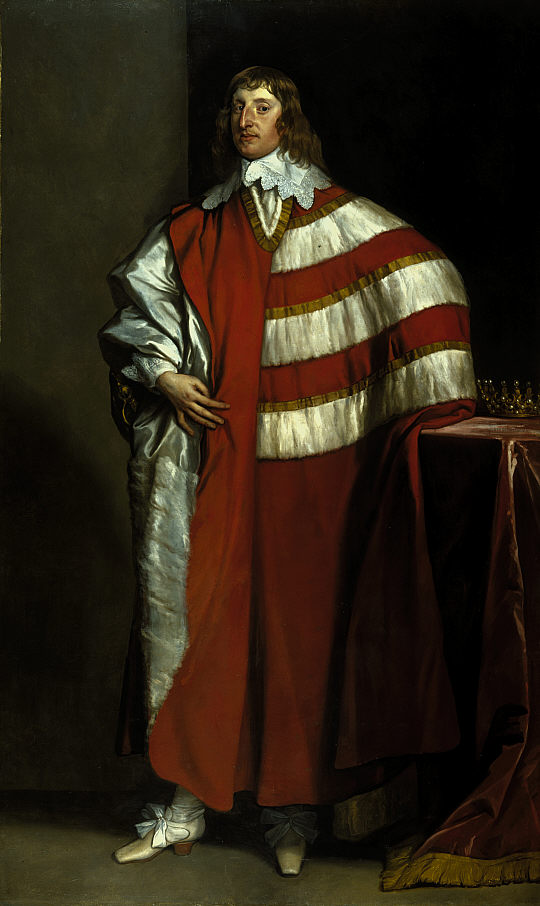
Charles Seton, 2nd Earl of Dunfermline.

Earl of Dunfermline was a title in the Peerage of Scotland. It was created in 1605 for Alexander Seton, 1st Lord Fyvie, fourth son of George Seton, 7th Lord Seton (see Earl of Winton for earlier history of the family). Seton had already been created Lord Fyvie in the Peerage of Scotland, in 1598, with remainder to his elder brother, John Seton. He was succeeded by his son, the second Earl. He was Keeper of the Privy Seal of Scotland between 1661 and 1672. His younger son, the fourth Earl (who succeeded his childless elder brother), was a supporter of the deposed James II and had his titles forfeited by parliament in 1690. He died in France in 1694 and the male line of the first Earl died out with him.

== Earls of Dunfermline (1605) ==
- Alexander Seton, 1st Earl of Dunfermline (1556–1622)
- Charles Seton, 2nd Earl of Dunfermline (1615–1672)
- Alexander Seton, 3rd Earl of Dunfermline (d. 1677)
- James Seton, 4th Earl of Dunfermline (d. 1694) (forfeit in 1690)

== See also ==
- Earl of Winton
- Baron Dunfermline
