= Barnes Castle =

Barnes castle
- East Lothian, Scotland
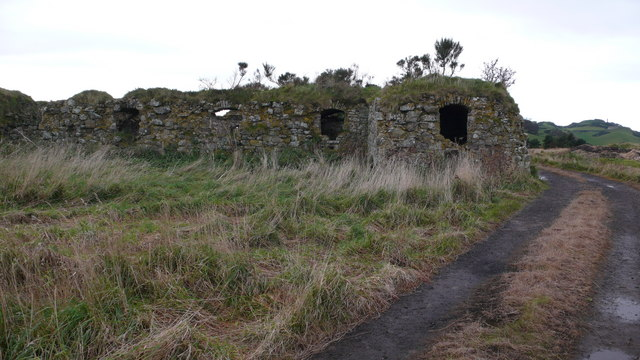
- Remains of Barnes Castle

Site information
- Condition: Ruin

Location
- Location within East Lothian
- Coordinates: 55.979714°N 2.756959°W

Site history
- Built: 16th century

Barnes Castle is an unfinished castle, with a number of defensive banks, located 5 kilometres (3.1 mi) north-east of Haddington in East Lothian, Scotland. It is close to Athelstaneford on the slopes of the Garleton Hills. The remains, also known as Barney Vaults or The Vaults, are protected as a scheduled monument.

== History ==
The Barnes estate was granted to Alexander de Seyton by King Robert the Bruce in 1321–1322; by the late 16th century it had passed to Sir John Seton of Barnes (died 1594), diplomat at the court of King Philip II of Spain and later King James VI's Treasurer of the Household and an Extraordinary Lord of Session. The property was sold out of the family by George Seaton, the Jacobite Earl of Dunfermline, in 1713.

== Description ==
The rubble-built quadrangular castle measures 162.5 by 126.7 feet (49.5 by 38.6 m) and runs along an axis from north-east to south-west. Square towers project from each corner with two intermediate square towers on the north-west, one on the south-west and another on the south-eastern walls. The residence occupies the north-eastern portion of the interior and there are remnants of a domestic range against the north-western wall. All of the towers are provided with gun loops to cover the sides of the walls. The entrance gate was in the centre of the south-west wall and led into a large courtyard. The residence has a symmetrical front with the doorway leading into a vestibule connected to a long hallway that stretches the width of the structure that leads to vaulted chambers. Two of these on the south-eastern side project into the courtyard, flanking the doorway, together with the adjacent stair towers. The chamber on the left side is identified as the kitchen by its large fireplace. The building is generally complete up to the level of the vaulted ground floor, but only some of the walls reach a height of 14 feet (4.3 m).

There are no other documentary records to the building and it appears that construction apparently ceased on Sir John's death. It is currently used to store agricultural equipment. For its time it was of a modern and symmetrical design.

== See also ==
- List of places in East Lothian
- List of castles in Scotland
