= Archibald Hamilton (bishop) =

16th and 17th-century Irish Anglican bishop of Scottish origin

- Born: c. 1580
- Died: 1659
- Spouse: Alison Hay (?)
- Parents: Claud Hamilton of Cochno (father); Margaret Betoun (mother)

Archibald Hamilton (c. 1580 – 1659) was the fourth Anglican Archbishop of Cashel.

== Birth and origins ==
Archibald was born around 1580 probably in Cochno, Dunbartonshire, Scotland, the second son of Claud Hamilton and his wife Margaret Betoun. His father was Laird of Cochno. His father's family was a cadet branch of the House of Hamilton founded by Walter fitz Gilbert of Cadzow. His mother was a daughter of Robert Betoun of Creich.

== Studies and marriages ==
Hamilton studied at Glasgow University and obtained a MA in 1599. He stayed on, started teaching but also became minister in Paisley in 1610. He became a Doctor of Divinity (D.D.) in 1617.

While still in Scotland he married his first wife, who probably was Alison Hay, who had been a nurse to Elizabeth, Queen of Bohemia.

Later he married Anne Balfour of Burleigh, daughter of James Balfour, 1st Baron Balfour of Glenawley.

He had four sons, and some of his descendants became established in the Swedish nobility.

== Career ==
He was nominated Bishop of Killala and Achonry on 8 March 1623 and consecrated 29 May that same year in St. Peter's Church, Drogheda. He was advanced Archbishop of Cashel on 14 November 1629 and appointed by letters patent on 20 April 1630. On 20 April 1630 he was translated to the archbishopric of Cashel and Emly.

== Income ==
The temporalities of his see having been much diminished by Miler Magragh, Hamilton petitioned Thomas Wentworth for their recovery. It required a special letter of instruction from the king to undo the acts of Magragh. Archbishop William Laud cautioned Wentworth to keep a sharp eye on Hamilton, who then incurred Laud's displeasure. Summoned to Dublin to explain matters, Hamilton pleaded inability to travel. His friends, including the Queen of Bohemia, interceded with the king.

== Flight to Sweden and death ==
When the Irish Rebellion of 1641 broke out in Tipperary, Hamilton was absent from his diocese. However he was joined by his wife and family, who had been helped by Catholic neighbours and he left for Sweden. His loss of personal property in the rebellion was great.

He is usually said to have died at Stockholm, aged about 80, in 1659. He died in office at Stockholm, Sweden in 1659.

== Sources ==
- Clavin, Terry. McGuire, James; Quinn, James (eds.). "Hamilton, Archibald". Dictionary of Irish Biography. – (online edition)
- Dunlop, Robert (1890). "Hamilton, Archibald, D.D. (1580?–1659)". In Lee, Sidney (ed.). Dictionary of National Biography. Vol. 24. New York: MacMillan and Co. pp. 138–139. OCLC 8544105.
- Fryde, E. B.; Greenway, D. E.; Porter, S.; Roy, I., eds. (1986). Handbook of British Chronology. Royal Historical Society Guides and Handbooks, No. 2 (3rd ed.). London: Offices of the Royal Historical Society. ISBN 0-86193-106-8. (for timeline)
- Grosjean, A. N. L. (2004). "Hamilton, Archibald (c.1578–1658/9)". In Matthew, Colin; Harrison, Brian (eds.). Oxford Dictionary of National Biography. Vol. 24. New York: Oxford University Press. pp. 769–770. ISBN 0-19-861374-1.

Attribution

- Dunlop, Robert (1890). "Hamilton, Archibald D.D. (1580?–1659)". In Lee, Sidney (ed.). Dictionary of National Biography. Vol. 24. New York: MacMillan and Co. pp. 138–139. OCLC 8544105.

Church of Ireland titles
Preceded by Inaugural appointment	Bishop of Killala and Achonry; 1623–1630	Succeeded by Archibald Adair
Preceded by Malcolm Hamilton	Archbishop of Cashel; 1630–1659	Succeeded by Thomas Fulwar
