= Margaret Seton =

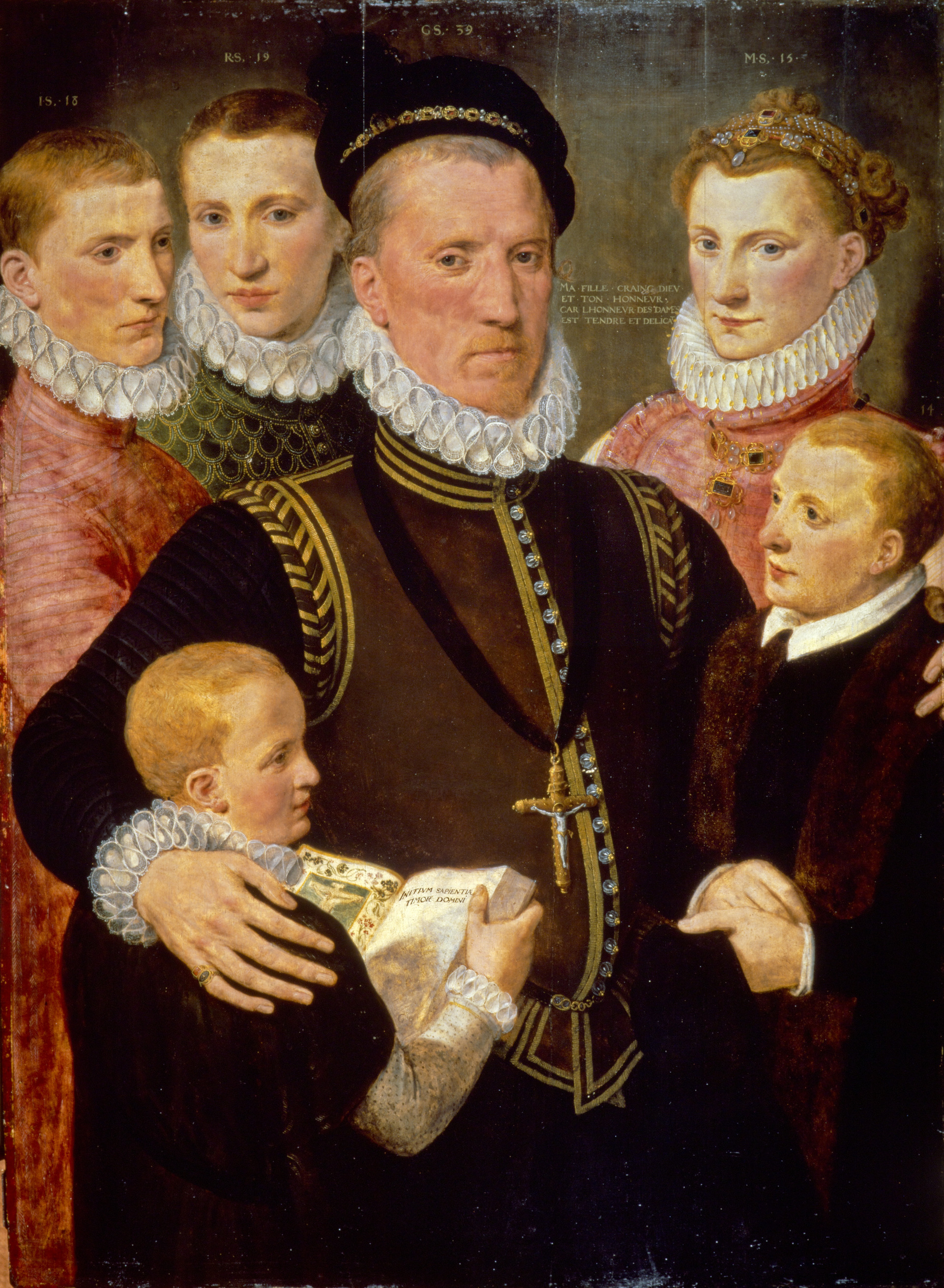
Margaret Seton, with her father and brothers, Frans Pourbus the Elder.

Margaret Seton, Lady Paisley (died 1616) was a Scottish aristocrat, courtier and a favourite of Anne of Denmark.

== Family background ==
She was a daughter of George Seton, 7th Lord Seton and Isobel Hamilton, a daughter of Sir William Hamilton of Sanquhar. A family group portrait by Frans Pourbus the Elder painted in 1572 has a French inscription, her father's advice to her, "My daughter, fear God and for your honour, since the honour of ladies is tender and delicate". She wears two bands of jewels and pearls in her auburn hair with a ruby and a sapphire as their centrepieces. Her necklace or carcanet has precious stones set in gold alternating with diamonds. The artist may have depicted actual family jewels.

In July 1568 Regent Moray granted her the goods of a number of men from Tranent, Winton, Longniddry, Winchburgh, and elsewhere, all tenants and servants of her father. They were implicated in the escape of Mary, Queen of Scots from Lochleven Castle and supporting her at the battle of Langside. Mary had first made her way to the Seton castle of Niddry in West Lothian and Lord Seton's retainers had escorted her to Hamilton.

== Marriage ==
After she married Claud Hamilton in 1574 she was known as "Lady Paisley". Married women in early modern Scotland did not change their surnames when they married. She continued to sign her letters, "Margaret Setoun".

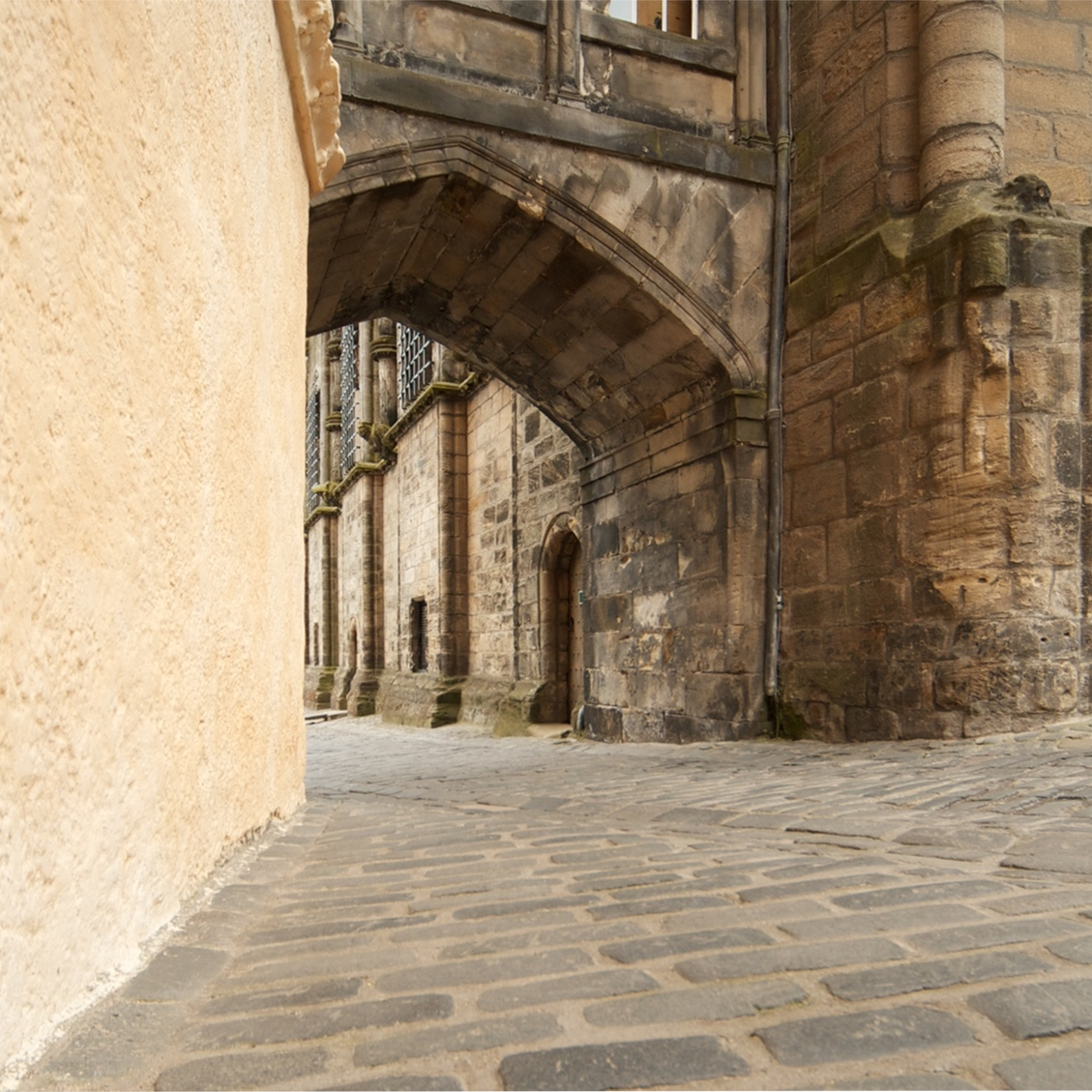
Margaret Seton, Lady Paisley, came to Stirling Castle with Anne of Denmark to collect Prince Henry

Her brother, Alexander Seton, asked for leave from his duties in Edinburgh to visit her at Paisley in December 1591 because she was ill.

She and her mother Isobel Hamilton, Lady Seton, became favourites of Anne of Denmark, the wife of James VI.

On 25 December 1602 Beatrix Ruthven, forbidden from the royal presence since the Gowrie Conspiracy, was smuggled into the apartments of Anne of Denmark at Holyrood House posing as a gentlewoman servant to Lady Paisley and her daughter Lady Angus, at the queen's request.

== The incident at Stirling Castle ==
On 7/17 May 1603, Anne of Denmark came to Stirling Castle accompanied by the Earl of Orkney, Lady Paisley and others, hoping to collect her son Prince Henry. At Stirling, Marie Stewart, Countess of Mar and her step-son the Master of Mar prevented this. Anne of Denmark made clear her intention to take her son away on the morning of Monday 9/19 May. After some discussions, they sat down to dinner and the queen became unwell. Jean Drummond and Lady Paisley's daughter-in-law Marion Boyd, Mistress of Paisley, helped carry the queen to bed where she had a miscarriage. The 17th-century historian John Spottiswoode, who attended the queen at this time as her almoner or "elemosynar", wrote, "her Majesty went to Striveling, of mind to bring away the prince her son, and carry him along with herself to England; but being denied by the friends of the House of Marre, she became so much incensed, as falling into a fever, she made a pitiful abortion".

Members of the Privy Council of Scotland travelled "in haste" to Stirling, including Alexander Seton, Lord Fyvie, the Earl of Montrose, William Stewart of Traquair, and the lawyers John Skene, John Preston of Fenton Barns, John Cockburn, and Thomas Hamilton. They spoke with the Earl of Mar, who had returned to the castle. Mar said that he had heard of plot to take Prince Henry from Stirling while he was away. Alexander Seton, Margaret's younger brother, wrote to King James advising him to treat the queen with care, writing, "physic and medicine requireth a greater place with Her Majesty at present than lectures on economics and politics." Seton mentioned her "extremity of sickness and disease" at his coming to Stirling. A letter from King James to Anne of Denmark at this time dismisses the Earl of Mar's suggestion of a plot, and asks her to put aside her grief or "dule", and "womanly apprehensions".

Anne of Denmark, according to Thomas Hamilton, told Lady Paisley and her physician Martin Schöner that she had taken "balm water". There were suggestions that this miscarriage or abortion was self-induced, perhaps by use of the "balm water". News of the incident quickly reached Paris, and the Venetian diplomat Giovanni Carlo Scaramelli wrote of her serious illness and that in her fury she had beat her own belly. English gentry hoping to meet the queen on her journey south spread the story of her delay, Francis Fitton wrote to Anne Newdigate, "the Queene hathe had lately some myshapp, which is not to be spoken". According to the French ambassador, the Marquess of Sully, when the Queen travelled to London, she "brought with her the body of the male child of which she had been delivered in Scotland, because endeavours had been used to persuade the public, that its death was only feigned".

== Later life ==
Lady Paisley wrote from Monkton to Anne of Denmark on 1 September 1610. She was hoping that the queen could help her avoid censure by the Presbytery of Ayr. She wrote that she had suffered from debilitating headaches and toothache for the last four years.

She died in February 1616.

== Marriage and children ==
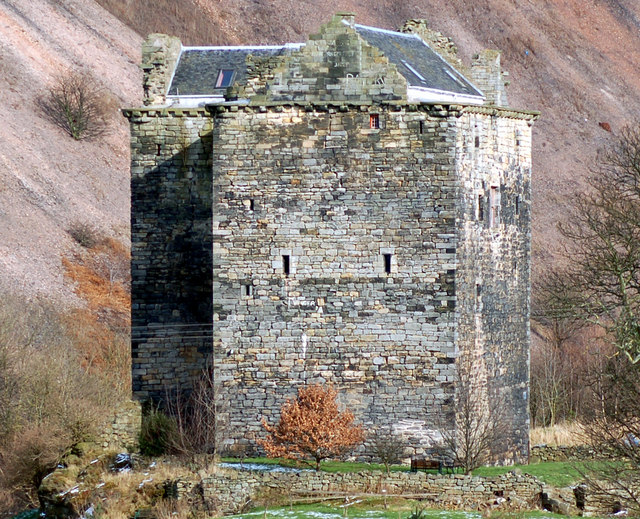
Niddry Castle

She married Claud Hamilton, 1st Lord Paisley in August 1574 at Niddry Castle. The wedding was celebrated with "great triumphs". Their children included:

- James Hamilton, 1st Earl of Abercorn (1575–1618)
- John Hamilton
- Claud Hamilton of Shawfield (died 1614)
- George Hamilton
- Frederick Hamilton (1590–1647)
- Margaret Hamilton (died 1623), who married William Douglas, 1st Marquess of Douglas

Three children who died as infants, Margaret (1577), Henry (1585), and Alexander (1587), are commemorated by an inscription at Paisley Abbey.
