= Alexander Seton, 1st Earl of Dunfermline =

Scottish judge and politician (1555–1622)

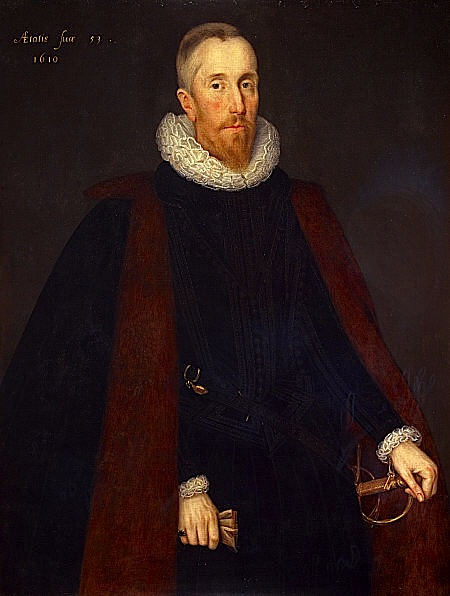
Alexander Seton, 1st Earl of Dunfermline, aged 53, by Marcus Gheeraerts the Younger.

Alexander Seton, 1st Earl of Dunfermline (1555 – 16 June 1622) was a Scottish lawyer, judge and politician. He served as Lord President of the Court of Session from 1598 to 1604, Lord Chancellor of Scotland from 1604 to 1622 and as a Lord High Commissioner to the Parliament of Scotland.

== Early life ==
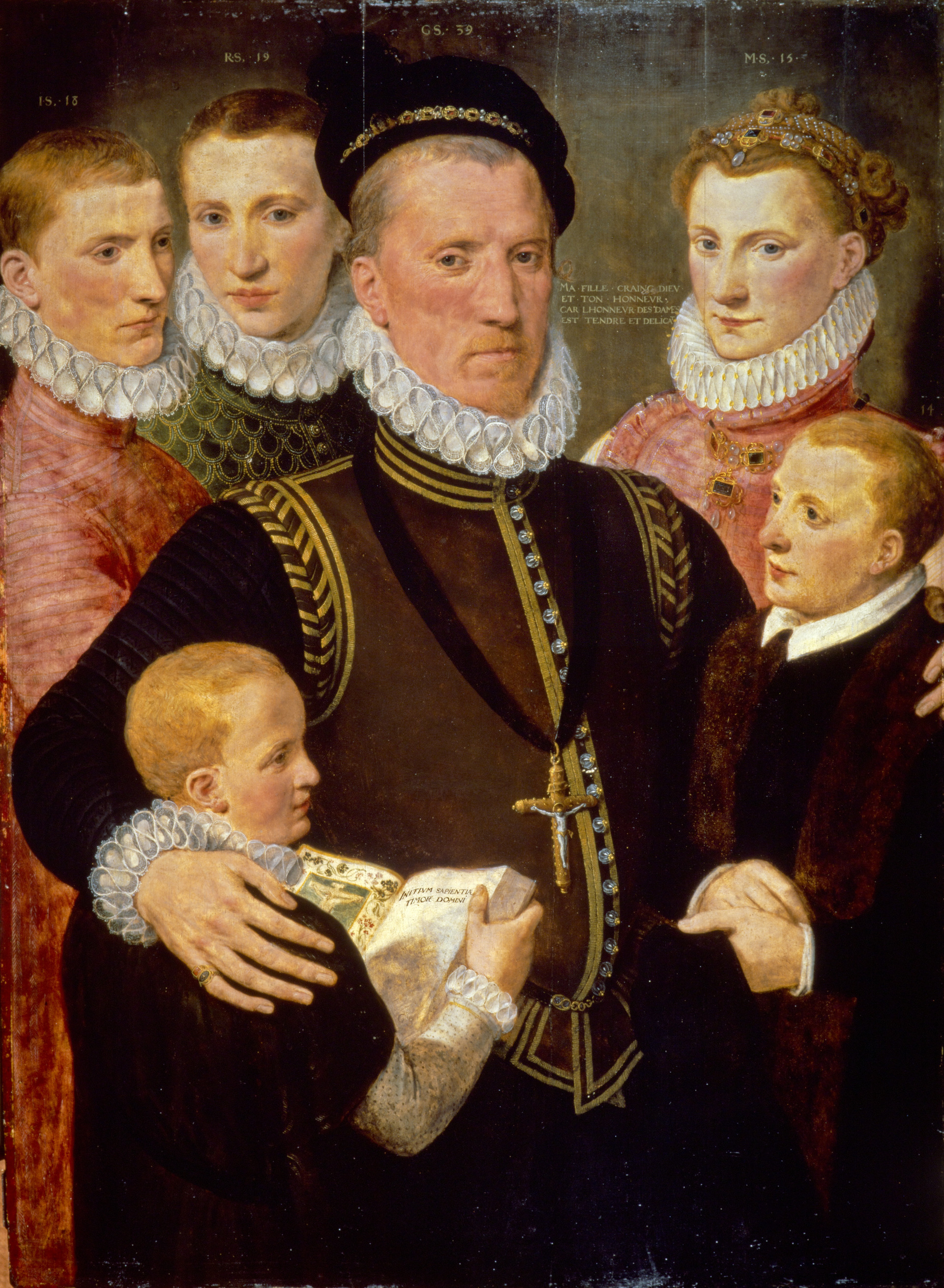
George, Lord Seton, and his children in 1572, including Margaret, Lady Paisley, Robert, Earl of Winton, Sir John Seton of Barns and Alexander Seton

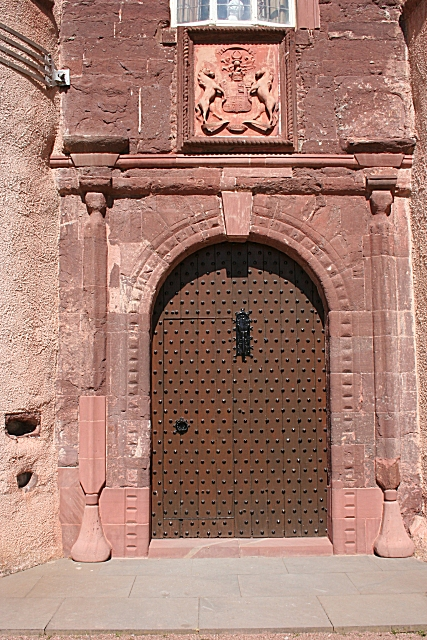
Entrance to Seton's Fyvie Castle

Born at Seton Palace, East Lothian, he was the son of George Seton, 7th Lord Seton, and Isobell Hamilton. The Setons remained a Roman Catholic family after the Scottish Reformation of 1560, and continued to support Mary, Queen of Scots, after her abdication and exile in England.

Mary, Queen of Scots appointed him Prior of Pluscarden in 1565, a gift made to him to provide an income. Alexander Seton was educated at the German and Roman College in Rome from June 1571 to December 1578. Alexander was noted learning Italian and science (philosophy) in Rome by Baptista da Trento in 1577 in a letter describing plots to marry Elizabeth I of England to the Earl of Leicester and re-instate Mary in Scotland. The family historian Viscount Kingston heard that he was skilled in mathematics, heraldry and architecture, and might have been made a Cardinal if he had stayed at Rome. A Venetian diplomat, Giovanni Carlo Scaramelli, heard that Pope Gregory XIII had subsidised Seton's study in Rome, and that Seton had a doctorate from the University of Bologna.

== Career ==
In 1583, Alexander Seton joined his father's embassy to France. William Schaw, the Master of Work to the Crown of Scotland was his companion. They left from Leith in Andrew Lamb's ship. According to the Jesuit Robert Parsons, Lord Seton considered sending the youthful Alexander back to Scotland as his representative at one point.

Alexander became a Privy Councillor in 1585 and was appointed a Lord of Session as Lord Urquhart in 1586. He rose to be Lord President of the Court of Session and was created Lord Fyvie on 4 March 1598. In a ciphered letter of April 1586 to Mary, Queen of Scots, Albert Fontenay mentioned Alexander Seton, "Monsieur le prieur de Seton", and his brother John Seton, "le chevalier maistre d'hostel du roy", among her Catholic allies in Scotland.

From July 1593, Seton led a council convened to manage the estates of Anne of Denmark, and she made him "bailie and justiciary of the regality of Dunfermline on both sides of Forth" on 15 February 1596. In December 1596, Richard Douglas wrote that Seton's mother was a great favourite of Anne of Denmark, and that she "rules the king her husband" as an explanation for his promotions.

Around this time, King James had difficult financing the two royal households, and years later, he wrote that Seton had joked that his "house could not be kept upon epigrams", meaning that fine words alone would not raise money.

Meanwhile, Jesuits like William Crichton saw Seton and Lord Home as an important Catholic courtiers and a route to the king and queen, as they explored the idea of James VI as future king of England. Crichton introduced an English Catholic, Nicholas Williamson, to a student at Douai, David Law. Crichton intended that Law would introduce Williamson to Seton, but they were both captured in March 1595 near Keswick and imprisoned in London.

At the end of August 1596 according to James Melville, the King arranged a Convention of the Estates at Falkland Palace which included the allies of the forfeited earls. Alexander Seton made a speech like those of Coriolanus or Themistocles calling for the re-instatement of these earls to strengthen the country. The reference to Themistocles, who spoke about naval power to the Athenians, perhaps refers to the forfeited Lord High Admiral of Scotland, Francis Stewart, 5th Earl of Bothwell.

On 7 November 1598 he was made burgess, Guild-brother and Provost of Edinburgh. In March 1598 he took delivery of Spanish and Bordeaux wine, probably for the banquet for Ulrik, the younger brother of Anne of Denmark at Riddle's Court. Other notes in the town's records include a dozen torches supplied by a waxmaker for the baptism of Princess Margaret in April 1599, and another dozen for the baptism of Prince Charles.

== Union of the Crowns ==
Seton was regarded as one of the finest legal minds of the time, and he became an advisor to James VI and guardian and tutor to Prince Charles at Dunfermline Palace.

After the death of Queen Elizabeth, Anne of Denmark went to Stirling Castle hoping to collect her son Prince Henry. Alexander Seton's sister Lady Paisley was of her companions that day. During heated discussions at the castle, Anne of Denmark had a miscarriage. As a member of the Privy Council, Seton went with others to Stirling in May 1603 to discuss and investigate the controversy. Seton wrote to King James in London advising him to treat the queen with care, writing, "physic and medicine requireth a greater place with Her Majesty at present than lectures on economics and politics."

After the Union of the Crowns when the Scottish royal family relocated to London, Seton remained on the committee supervising Anne's Scottish incomes, while James VI went to England, and the infant Charles remained with Seton and his wife Grizel Leslie at Dunfermline Palace.

On 14 March 1604, Seton wrote to Robert Cecil on the subject of the union and opinion in Scotland;

This Union is the most at this time of all men's hearts and speeches. I find none of any account here but glad in heart to embrace the same in general: some suspect the particular conditions may engender greater difficulties. I hope the wisdom of the Prince who is both the ground and the cornerstone of this happy Union, with your and other wise men's assistance shall set by all such difficulties: as also I think there can be no particular condition desired for the weal (commonwealth) of one of the nations, but it must be profitable to the other, nor nothing prejudicial to one, but must be hurtful to the other, albeit only by the distracting of their due concord which wise men will think of greater consequence, nor any particular may be subtly cozened (brought) in. This is all I can write even of our thoughts here-away: I doubt not there are divers apprehensions there also".

In 1604, he was appointed Lord Chancellor of Scotland, and in 1605 was created Earl of Dunfermline. Alexander Seton brought Prince Charles, Duke of Albany, to England in August 1604. There was a large entourage, and John Crane wrote from Worksop Manor to the Mayor of Leicester asking him to make ready a lodging with 12 beds, a kitchen, and 7 hogsheads of beer. They lodged in William Skipwith's Leicester townhouse. Next they went to Dingley, the home of Thomas Griffin.

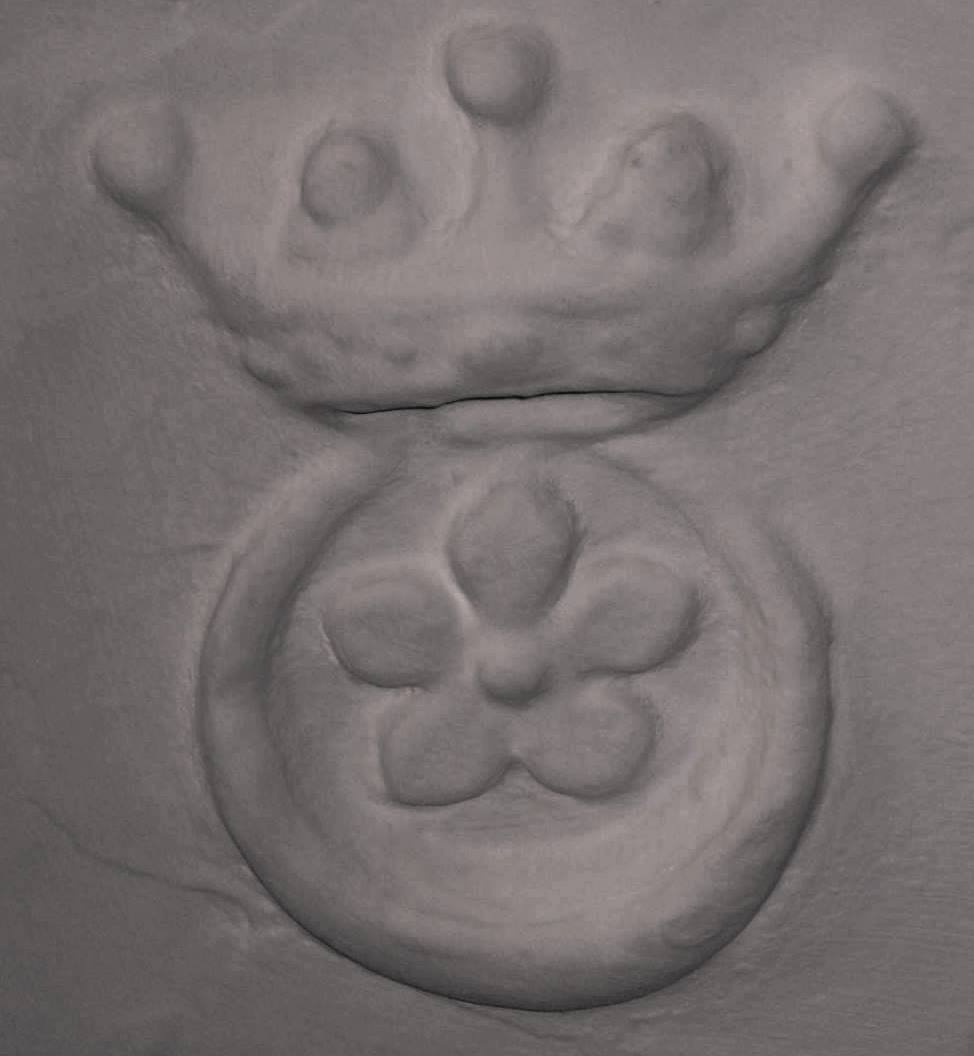
Heraldic cipher of Alexander Seton on a first floor ceiling at Moubray House, Edinburgh

Seton stayed in London till January 1605, co-inciding with the visit of the Ulrik, Duke of Holstein, and had a tour of armouries of the Tower of London. At Whitehall, Viscount Cranborne arranged for him to read the original Treaty of Greenwich, which had led to the war of the Rough Wooing in 1543, and other documents. Seton returned the historical papers to Cecil on 3 November.

Alexander Seton returned to Scotland with a pension of £200 to reward his keeping of Prince Charles, made Duke of York on Twelfth Night, and his expenses for his 'pains in the Union' amounting to £200 a year. He had made friends with the Venetian ambassador in London, Zorzi Giustinian, who sent him pamphlets about Venetian politics.

Seton corresponded with the Chancellor of England, Lord Ellesmere. His letter of 30 October 1606 mentions the plague in Scotland which had been continuous in Edinburgh for four years, and although the outbreak was not vehement at this time, it interfered with the sitting of law courts. The plague was worse in Ayr and Stirling and 2,000 people had died in the last two months.

After the death of George Home, 1st Earl of Dunbar, Seton was made Keeper of Holyrood Palace and the park and gardens, with power to appoint gardeners to the north and south yards, and the small garden.

In 1609 he was again in England. Henry Yelverton had fallen from the king's favour. A Mr Dummond, perhaps John Drummond of Hawthornden, advised him to enlist the help Arbella Stuart to gain Alexander Seton's support. Seton duly presented Yelverton's petition to King James during his progress at Hinchingbrooke.

In 1611 he helped a French clockmaker Nicolas Foucanote settle in Edinburgh. He had served Henry IV of France and came to London asking help from Anne of Denmark, who sent him to Seton. Seton helped him become a burgess of Edinburgh by arranging his marriage to Elizabeth Robesoun, daughter of John Robesoun of Leith, burgess of Edinburgh, who had been butcher and supplier of foodstuffs to the royal households.

Seton had an official lodging in Holyrood Palace, and also rented properties on the High Street including Riddle's Court. In July 1614, his wife prepared a guest room at Holyrood for Elizabeth Schaw, the wife of John Murray of bedchamber, but she had chosen to stay elsewhere.

In February 1616 he was again in London and saw Anne of Denmark at Greenwich, writing that he spoke to her in the old familiar manner, although she was ill and kept to her bedchamber. He felt that the Scots were left out of government business as "we ar leitill bettir nor idill cifres heir" - "we are little better than idle ciphers here." On 5 April, he attended a meeting at Whitehall Palace to discuss proposals for Prince Charles to marry a French princess. Around this time, Seton received medical treatment from the court physician Théodore de Mayerne.

Later in 1616, in preparation for the royal visit to Scotland, he was required by the Privy Council of Scotland to declare what remained of the Scottish Royal tapestry collection at Dunfermline Palace. He stated there were 10 pieces "of auld and worne tapestrie of the storie of Aeneas, the storie of Troy, and of the story of Mankynd."

His modern humanist and neo-stoic attitude was demonstrated by his energetic defence of Geillis Johnstone accused of witchcraft in 1614.

== Material culture, artistic and literary patronage ==
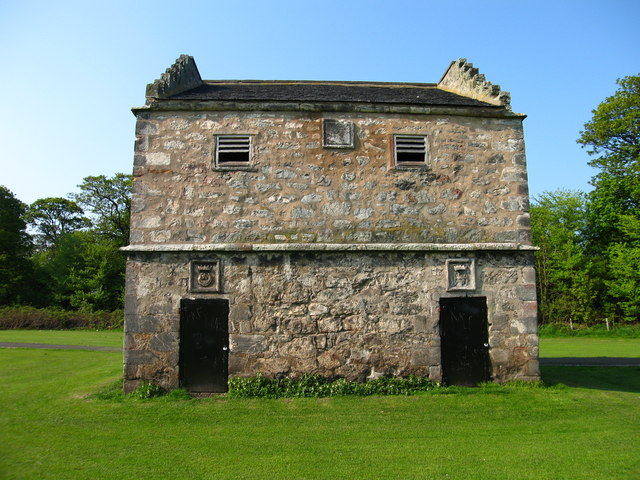
Doocot (English 'Dovecote') at Pinkie House with Seton's characteristic cipher of a crowned crescent and cinquefoil over door to right

A portrait of his wife Margaret Hay, painted by Marcus Gheeraerts the Younger in 1615 is in the Dunedin Public Art Gallery. Part of a painted ceiling bearing his monogram and heraldry from Pinkie House is displayed at Edinburgh's Huntly House museum: his painted long gallery is still preserved at Pinkie House, now Loretto School. Of Pinkie House the family historian wrote, "he built ane noble house, brave stone dykes about the garden and orchards, with other commendable policie about it."

In his 1622 will, Seton directed the Earl of Winton and his brother Sir William Seton to complete his building work at Pinkie. They were requested to "have caire to sie the foir laich wark at Pinkie in the inner court therof tirrit & theikit of new with skailyie (roofed), and that this new wark begunne by me be everie way perfytit & buildit in all materials to the final ending thereof ... according to my intention and mynd declarit to Alexander Ingillis of Rottinraw my servant, and as the plat (plan) of the same is set downe".

The gallery at Pinkie is a plain wooden vault, and the painting subdivides into compartments filled with emblems and mottoes. The general theme may have been to celebrate the Union of the Crowns. The painting was not to the taste of later generations, in 1668 John Lauder of Fountainhall saw the gallery and other paintings which do not now survive, and wrote that Seton had "been mighty conceity in pretty mottoes and saying, whereof the walls and roofs of all the roomes are filled, stuffed with good moralitie, though somewhat pedantick."

Archaeologists have discovered parts of his garden at Fyvie. Seton also had a lodging in Edinburgh, and in July 1597 James VI held a lengthy audience with the ambassador Robert Bowes in this garden. He rented accommodation from John MacMorran, probably at Riddle's Court on the Lawnmarket.

His will includes tapestry of "portrait and forest work" and gilt leather hangings and curtains, almost as valuable as his library at Fyvie and Pinkie. Personal jewellery included, two "horns" or tags set with 77 diamonds and 2 rubies; the jewel called the Orpheus having 20 diamonds and 25 rubies; a gold swan set with 40 diamonds; 2 rubies, and a pearl; a griffin (the Seton crest) set with a ruby and sapphire; a gold cross, an image of the Virgin Mary, and a gold toothpick.

A catalogue of a part of his library at Pinkie survives. In 1599 Robert Pont, the father of the cartographer Timothy Pont dedicated his book, A Newe Treatise of the Right Reckoning of Yeares and Ages of the World, to Alexander Seton. The dedication placed Seton as a rare Maecenas of this Land". In 1617, John Napier of Merchiston dedicated his Rabdologiae seu Numerationis per virgulas libri duo to Seton. The book describes the method of multiplication using rods called "Napier's bones," and its Latin dedication acknowledges the help of Seton as the "illustrious Scottish Maecenas."

Alexander Seton also commissioned the tomb of his friend the architect William Schaw at Dunfermline Abbey.

== Death and funeral ==
After 15 days of illness, Alexander Seton died on Sunday 16 June 1622 at Pinkie. His nephew, the Earl of Winton, had spent 12 sleepless days at his bedside.

On 19 June his body was taken by boat across the Forth to his house at Dalgety Bay near Dunfermline. He was buried in his vault in Dalgety Church, on 9 July 1622. A manuscript describes in detail the elaborate procession from the house (long demolished) to the kirk, which included his Master Stabler John Menzies of Carlops riding in full armour, and his Master Household John Drummond with a black flag, known as the "gumpheon of state", painted with a skull and tears. John Spottiswoode, Archbishop of St Andrews, gave the sermon.

The Earl of Melros wrote to the courtier John Murray of Lochmaben on the 19 June, discussing the difficulty of finding a replacement administrator, writing "Many are able to serve at tennis, at the cord, who are unfit for the house".

== Marriages and children ==
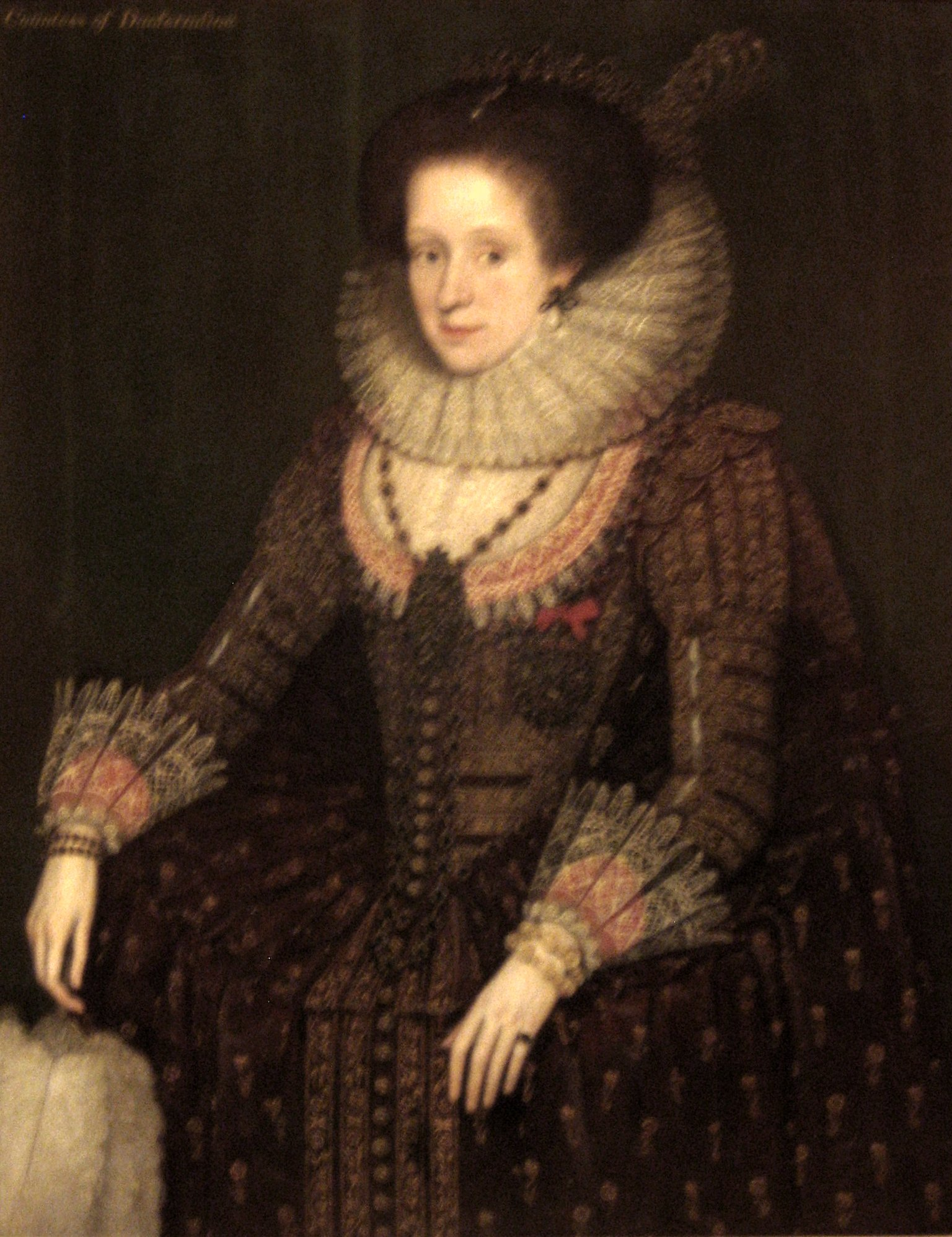
Margaret Hay, Countess of Dunfermline, by Marcus Gheeraerts the Younger, Dunedin Public Art Gallery

Alexander Seton first married Lilias Drummond, daughter of Patrick Drummond, 3rd Lord Drummond, their children were;

- Anne Seton, (b. circa 1593), married Alexander Erskine, Viscount Fentoun, their eldest son was Alexander Erskine, 3rd Earl of Kellie.
- Isobel Seton, married John Maitland, 1st Earl of Lauderdale.
- Margaret Seton (I), (baptised in Edinburgh, 1596), died in infancy,
- Margaret Seton (II), (b. 1599), married Colin Mackenzie, 1st Earl of Seaforth.
- Sophia Seton, who married David Lindsay, 1st Lord Balcarres in 1612.

Alexander Seton married secondly in 1601, Grizel Leslie, a daughter of James Leslie, Master of Rothes, their children were;

- Charles (I), died young.
- Lilias Seton, (baptised November 1602)
- Jean Seton, (b. circa 1606), married John Hay, 8th Lord Yester.

Alexander Seton married thirdly, circa 1607, Margaret Hay (1592–1659), daughter of James Hay, 7th Lord Hay of Yester.

- Charles Seton, 2nd Earl of Dunfermline.
- Grizel Seton, (b. 1609)
- Mary Seton, (b. 1611)

Seton's widow Margaret Hay married James Livingstone, Lord Almond and Earl of Callendar, in 1633.

Legal offices
Preceded by William Baillie of Provand	Lord President of the Court of Session; 1593–1604	Succeeded by James Elphinstone, Lord Balmerino
Political offices
Preceded by 3rd Earl of Montrose	Lord Chancellor of Scotland; 1604–1622	Succeeded by 1st Earl of Kinnoull
Peerage of Scotland
New creation	Earl of Dunfermline; 1605–1622	Succeeded by Charles Seton
New creation	Lord Fyvie; 1598–1622	Succeeded by Charles Seton
