= Niddry Castle =

Tower house in Scotland

Coordinates: 55°57′13.29″N 3°26′55.44″W

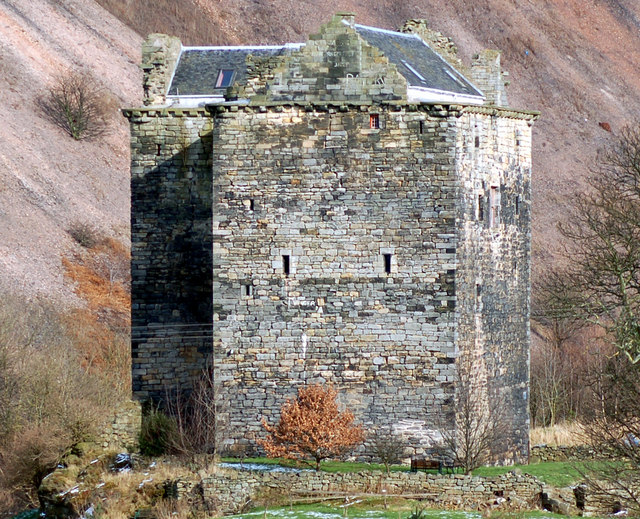
Niddry Castle

Niddry Castle is a sixteenth-century tower house near Winchburgh, West Lothian, Scotland. It is situated near the Union Canal, and between two large oil shale bings, or waste heaps. Historically it was known as Niddry Seton or West Niddry to distinguish it from Niddry Marischal in Midlothian and Longniddry in East Lothian.

== History ==
The tower was built around 1500 by the Lord Seton. Mary, Queen of Scots was brought here by Claud Hamilton on 2 May 1568, after her escape from captivity in Lochleven Castle. She wrote letters to her allies from Niddry, and then moved on to Hamilton.

George, Lord Seton garrisoned the castle in support of Queen Mary in 1572 during the civil war in Scotland. According to two chronicles, the Diurnal of Occurrents and the Historie of James the Sext, Niddry was attacked twice, in April and June. In April, Captain Scougall with forewarning repelled a night attack. He suspended heavy timber beams around the tower and released them on a party climbing scaling ladders. The garrison of Edinburgh Castle supported Niddry by attacking Merchiston Castle, which was held for James VI, as a diversion.

Margaret Seton, daughter of Lord Seton married Claud Hamilton, on 1 August 1574 at Niddry with "great triumphs." On 13 May 1590, Peder Munk, Great Admiral of Denmark, and the Danish commissioners appointed to take possession of lands granted to Anne of Denmark stayed at the castle, before riding to Linlithgow Palace the next morning. Patrick Gordon of Auchindoun stayed at Niddry as the guest of Lord Seton in July 1590, hoping to regain royal favour.

In around 1680, the castle passed to the Hope family and became part of the Hopetoun estate. The Hope family, now Marquises of Linlithgow, were granted the additional title Baron Niddry in 1814. In the 1990s, Niddry Castle was restored by Peter Wright as a private residence. An extensive archaeological excavation of the castle and its surrounding barmkin area was also initiated by the proprietor. Formerly a Scheduled Monument, the tower was de-scheduled in 1996 to allow restoration, at which point it was upgraded to an A Listing.

The four-storey L-plan tower has a corbelled parapet, and a turret in the angle of the "L", which was added in the 17th century. The basement is vaulted, and the hall was above, on the first floor.

The Castle features briefly in the closing pages of Sir Walter Scott's novel The Abbot which deals with the flight of Queen Mary to England.

== See also ==
- List of places in West Lothian
