= Seton (surname) =

Seton is the surname of a prominent Scottish Lowlands family, Clan Seton, and may refer to:

== Hereditary titles ==
- The Earls of Winton
- The Earls of Huntly
- The Earls of Dunfermline
- The Earls of Eglinton
- The Viscounts Kingston
- The Baronet of Windygoul
- The Baronets of Abercorn
- The Baronets of Garleton
- The Baronets of Pitmedden

== Given names of several Setons ==
- Alexander Seton (disambiguation)
- George Seton (disambiguation)
- John Seton (disambiguation)

== Other ==
- Alex Seton (born 1977), Australian artist
- Anya Seton (1906–1990), American historical novelist, daughter of Ernest Thompson Seton
- Archibald Seton (1758–1818), Scottish East India Company colonial administrator, resident, and civil servant
- Barry Seton (1936–2026), Australian racing driver
- Bruce Seton (1909–1969), British actor and soldier
- Catherine Seton (1800–1891), daughter of Elizabeth Ann Seton
- Christopher Seton (died 1306), 13th-century Scottish noble
- Cora Seton (born 1969), author
- Cynthia Propper Seton (1926–1982), American novelist
- Elizabeth Ann Seton (1774–1821), American Catholic saint
- Ernest Thompson Seton (1860–1946), Canadian-American scouting pioneer
- George Seton (1822–1908), Scottish philanthropist and genealogist
- Glenn Seton (born 1965), Australian racing driver, son of Barry Seton
- James Alexander Seton (1816–1845), last British person to be killed in a duel on English soil
- John de Seton (died 1306), Scottish knight
- Josiah Seton (born 1979), Liberian footballer
- Julia Seton (1862-1950), American physician, lecturer and author
- Maria Seton, Australian geologist
- Marie Seton (1910–1985), film critic and biographer
- Mary Seton (1549–1615), daughter of George Seton, 6th Lord Seton, one of the "Four Marys" of Mary, Queen of Scots
- Robert Seton (bishop) (1839–1927), Monsignor, American Catholic Archbishop and historian
- Thomas Seton (c.1738–1806), Scottish painter
- William Seton (writer) (1835–1905), American author, novelist and popular science writer
- William Seton, 1st Lord Seton (died 1410), Scottish noble
- William Seton of Kylesmure (1562–1635), Scottish landowner and postmaster

== See also ==
- Seton-Watson (disambiguation), surname
- Seton Hall (disambiguation), several places
- Seton (disambiguation)
