= John Seton =

John Seton or Seaton may refer to:

- John Seton, 1st Baron Parbroath (died 1327)
- John Seton, Lord Barns (died 1594), Scottish diplomat, courtier and judge
- John Seton (priest) (c.1498–1567), English Roman Catholic priest, known as the author of a logic text
- Sir John Seton (letter writer), Scottish soldier, correspondent in the 1630s and 1640s
- Sir John Seton, 1st Baronet (1639–1686)
- John Thomas Seton (c. 1738–1806), Scottish painter
- John Seton (MP), member of parliament for Northampton (UK Parliament constituency)
- John Seton (musician), Scottish pipe band drum major
- John Seaton (footballer), Scottish footballer
- John Seaton (cricketer), English cricketer
