= James Roosevelt Bayley =

American Catholic bishop (1814–1877)

The Most Reverend James Roosevelt Bayley
- Archbishop of Baltimore
- Bayley, c. 1855–1865
- See: Baltimore
- Appointed: June 30, 1872
- Installed: October 13, 1872
- Term ended: October 3, 1877
- Predecessor: Martin John Spalding
- Successor: James Gibbons
- Previous post: Bishop of Newark (1853–72)

Orders
- Ordination: March 2, 1844 by John Hughes
- Consecration: October 30, 1853 by Gaetano Bedini

Personal details
- Born: August 23, 1814 New York City, U.S.
- Died: October 3, 1877 (aged 63) Newark, New Jersey, U.S.
- Buried: National Shrine of St. Elizabeth Ann Seton
- Denomination: Roman Catholic Church

James Roosevelt Bayley (August 23, 1814 – October 3, 1877) was an American Catholic prelate who served as the first Bishop of Newark from 1853 to 1872 and as Archbishop of Baltimore from 1872 to 1877.

== Early life and education ==
Bayley's paternal grandfather, Dr. Richard Bayley, was a professor at Columbia College who created New York's quarantine system. Dr. Bayley had three children by his first wife, among whom was Elizabeth Ann Seton, who was canonized in 1975 as the first American-born Catholic saint. After his first wife's death, Dr. Bayley married Charlotte Amelia Barclay, a member of the Roosevelt family, and the couple had seven children, the sixth of whom was Archbishop Bayley's father, Guy Carleton Bayley, born in 1786. Guy Carleton Bayley, a physician like his father, married his second cousin Grace Roosevelt, six years his junior, on November 4, 1813. Grace Roosevelt was the daughter of Jacobus Roosevelt and Maria Eliza Walton, and her brother, Isaac Roosevelt, was the grandfather of future President Franklin D. Roosevelt, making Archbishop Bayley a first cousin to President Roosevelt's father James Roosevelt I, and a fourth cousin twice removed of future President Theodore Roosevelt.

Bayley was the couple's first child, born at their home at 65 Chambers Street, New York City, on August 23, 1814, and baptized at Trinity Church on September 21. A brother Richard was born on October 25, 1816, while the family was living at 331 Pearl Street, beside Grandfather Roosevelt's place of business at 333 Pearl Street. The following year, Dr. Bayley, probably desiring more healthful surroundings for his family than the city, purchased three pieces of land in Mamaroneck in Westchester County, and the family made their new home on one of these, a fifty-acre plot known as Nelson Hill. In this home, three other children were born: Carleton in November 1818, William Augustus in May 1821, and the only daughter, Maria Eliza, on March 1, 1823.

One writer asserts that Bayley's early school days were spent at Mendham Township, New Jersey. Another relates that he received a fair elementary education in the "public schools" of New York and displayed great studiousness and "an extraordinary love of miscellaneous reading." This may have referred to the schools in Mamaroneck or in New York City, where he may have lived with his grandfather. A later biographer infers he may have begun his earliest education in New Jersey and continued it in New York.

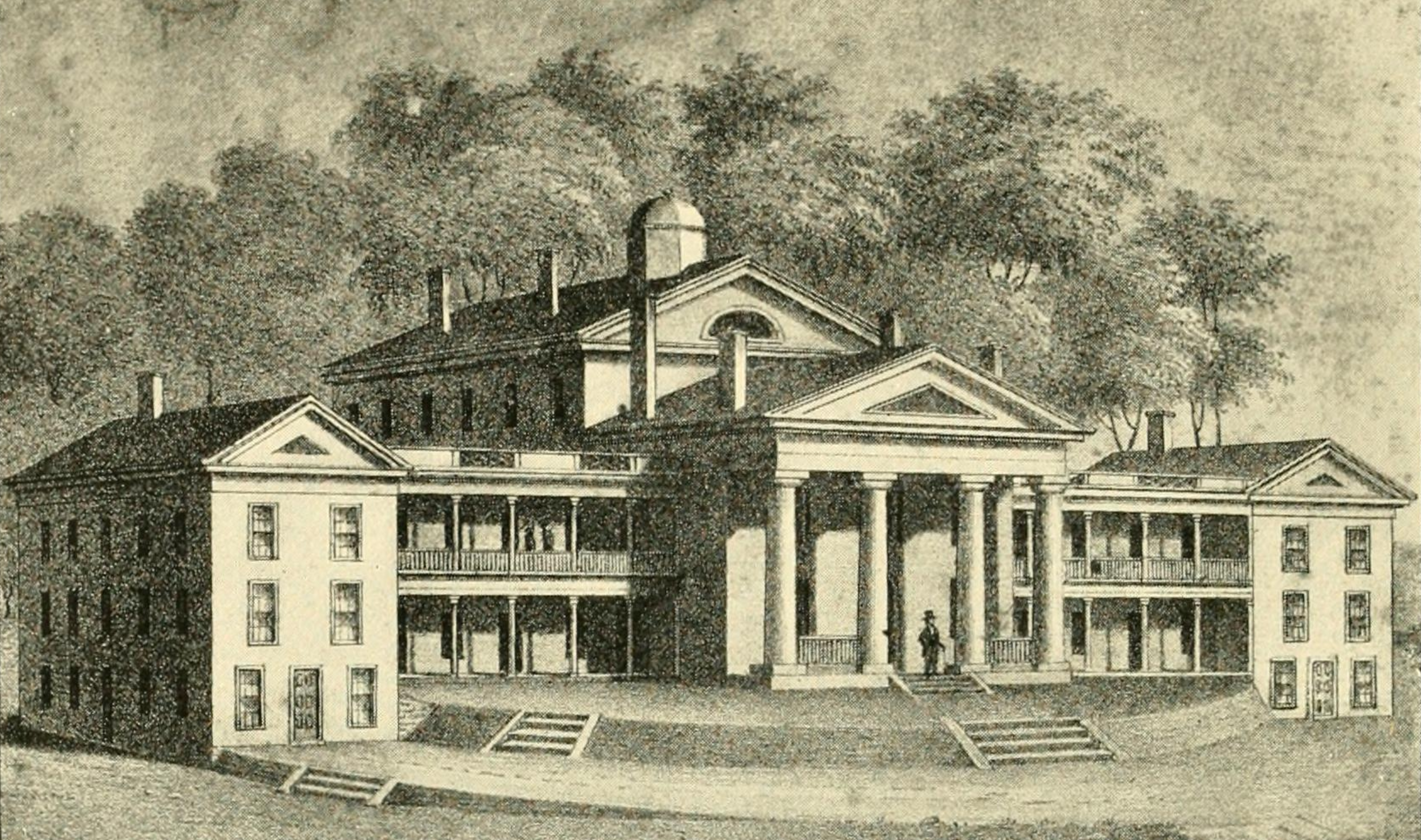
Mount Pleasant Classical Institute, a boys' boarding school in Amherst, Massachusetts

Bayley's mother died on March 28, 1828, and by 1830 the Bayleys had left their home at Mamaroneck and had moved back to New York, or at least nearer to it. In the autumn of 1828 or 1829, Bayley left for boarding school, spending some time at the Mount Pleasant Classical Institute in Amherst, Massachusetts. A classmate there later recalled, "he then had a great fancy for the sea, and actually obtained a commission of midshipman in the navy. When he appeared before us in his uniform preparatory to leaving school, I well remember our admiration and envy of the naval hero. But upon mature deliberation he reconsidered the matter, packed his uniform away, and devoted himself to his studies more earnestly than ever." For many years after, his friends called him by the nickname "the commodore." The same classmate recalled that "I do not remember that the commodore was ever counted in when there was a quarrel, for he was everybody's friend." Bayley kept up his friendships from this school until the end of his life, and regularly sent letters to class reunions even when he could not attend in person.

In 1831, Bayley matriculated at Amherst College, studying there for two years. A classmate later recalled that he "sustained good rank as a scholar" and "possessed decided talent." There, he became an active member of the Alexandrian Literary Society, in which he was given an opportunity to practice public speaking as a participant in its debates. After leaving Amherst, Bayley matriculated in the fall of 1833 at Washington College in Hartford, Connecticut, a young institution with only seven undergraduates in Bayley's senior class. His classmate Robert Tomes, expressing surprise at Bayley's subsequent position as an archbishop, recalled of Bayley:

"[He] was no student, and, in fact, seemed to think of nothing but the care, inside and out, of his own lusty, handsome person, and of the cigar he was perpetually puffing. He had a broad and ruddy face, and was always of a jovial humor."

Shortly after his matriculation at Washington College, Bayley became a member of another literary society, the Athenaeum, and during his years there, he helped found a literary and social society, the I.K.A. Bayley's final examinations lasted twenty hours, distributed as follows as recorded by Bayley in a notebook: four hours devoted to the classics—Livy, Cicero, Homer, Tacitus, Juvenal; seven to mathematics and natural science, including navigation, surveying, conic sections, mechanics, chemistry, astronomy, and optics; three to moral and intellectual philosophy and political economy; four to belles-lettres and rhetoric; and one each to jurisprudence (James Kent's Commentaries on American Law) and to Christian evidences (William Paley's). Bayley received his bachelor's degree on August 6, 1835. He had decided to follow in the footsteps of his father and grandfather by studying medicine.

Bayley returned to Hartford as a resident graduate to begin his medical studies. However, he subsequently changed his mind and began studying under the Rev. Samuel Farmar Jarvis to enter the Episcopal ministry. It is not certain what was the determining factor in this change in the course of his studies. In his autobiographical sketch, Bayley stated simply: "Studied medicine one year & then Theology with the Revd. Dr. Saml. Farmar Jarvis, at Middletown." He spent several happy, profitable years there studying under an eminent clergyman who was an authority on ecclesiastical history and antiquities, and allowed his students free access to his personal library of 10,000 volumes. He became acquainted with "the elegant Oxford edition of the Fathers and the more erudite French and Italian editions of the same and other important works" and "waded through the literature of the middle ages," such as the works of Peter of Blois and Vincent of Beauvais which served to remove from his mental vision the scales of prejudice against the misnamed Dark Ages.

During these studies, Bayley began to question the claims of the Protestant Episcopal Church to be the Catholic Church founded by Jesus and the consequent contention that the "Romish" Church was the dissenting and heretical one. Archbishop Robert Seton (a grandson of Mother Seton, and Bayley's first cousin once removed) recalled Bayley's once telling him that "his earliest attraction to the Faith was received while reading the works of Saint Jerome, and was strengthened in it by the study of Christian antiquities." Bayley recalled in 1876 that in the preparation of an essay for Dr. Jarvis on the apostolic canons which obliged him to study the ancient councils and the fathers of the Church, he had become convinced "that the Pope had much more to do with the government of the Church, than we were willing to allow." In 1842, Bayley wrote to his Washington College classmate and friend John Williams concerning Jarvis' influence upon him,

"when he saw the bias of my mind he used all his endeavors to turn it, from what he believed to be dangerous error, and I am convinced, that it was with a sincere and lively sorrow that he found his arguments, and I may say entreaties were likely to prove useless... But if I be asked whether the principles which I learned under his roof, and I may say general instruction, inclined me to join the Church in communion with Rome, I ... positively answer, Yes—I ... assert, that high-Churchmanship led me to Rome, as it has led and is likely to lead many others—It was the respect for Antiquity, and the testimony of the Fathers, which I learned in the course of instruction recommended by him that first inclined me to seek and at last enabled me to find a refuge from doubt and uncertainty, in the fixed, unalterable Catholic, or if you will, Roman or Papal faith".

However, he must have temporarily allayed such doubts as proceeding from an immature mind, which, as compared with the ripe and seasoned scholarship of such as Dr. Jarvis, could not be depended upon to pass judgment on such an important matter.

== Episcopalian ministry ==
While still studying with Dr. Jarvis, Bayley was ordained a deacon in Christ Church on October 3, 1839. Shortly afterwards, he received a letter from his cousin, Emma Craig, informing him that through the influence of his family, he was to have St. Andrew's Episcopal Church in Harlem while the Rev. Abram B. Hart was absent due to illness. Bayley served there through the winter of 1839–1840, and happily spent the following summer in the discharge of ministerial duties in Zion Church at Avon. After Mr. Hart's continued illness forced him to resign the following September as rector of St. Andrew's, Harlem, an entry in the parish register recorded that on October 19, 1840, "the Rev. James Roosevelt Bayley, deacon, received and accepted a call to the rectorship." On February 14, 1841, he was ordained in St. Andrew's Church by Bishop Benjamin T. Onderdonk, and "admitted to Priest's Orders."

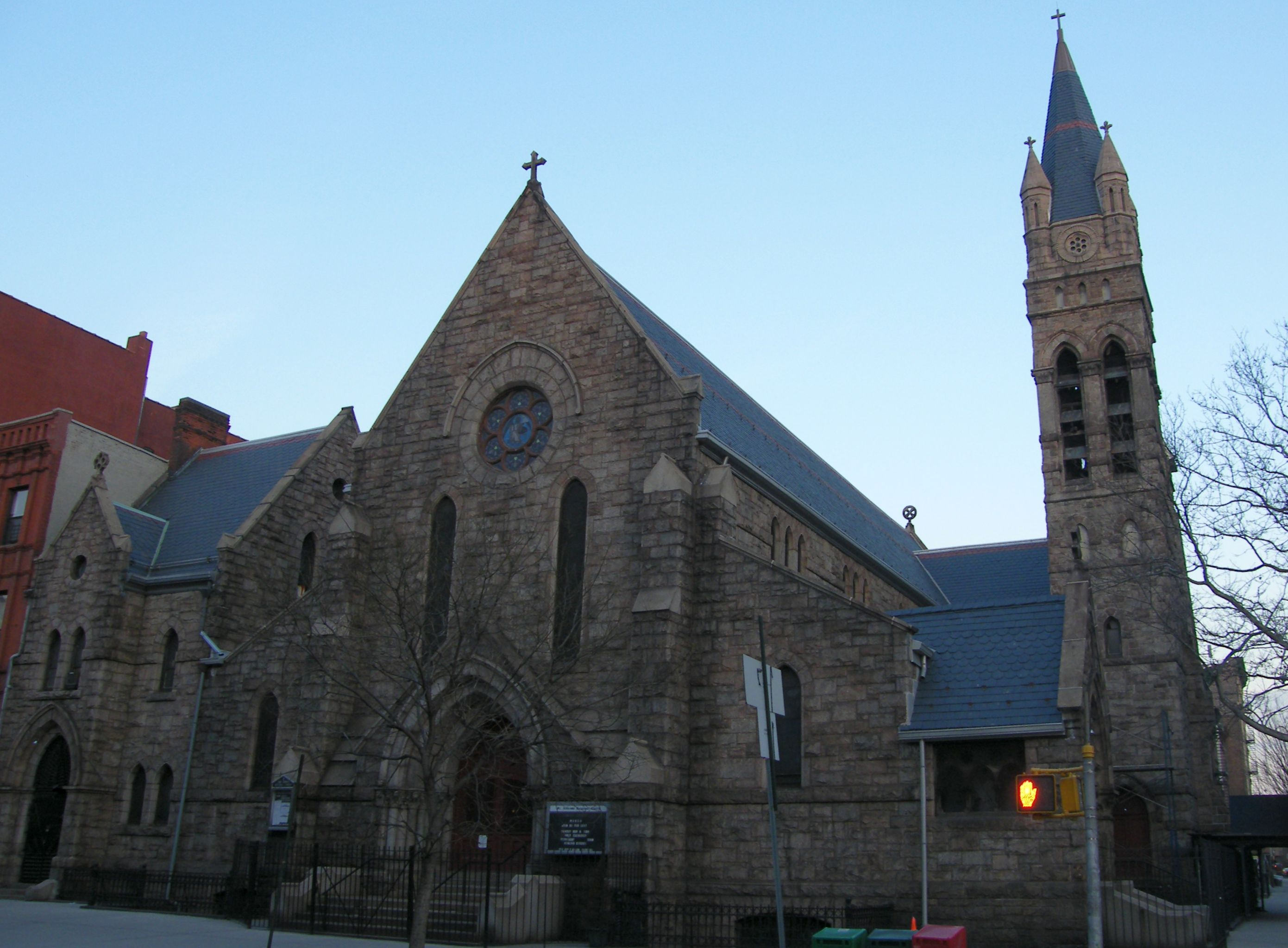
St. Andrew's, Harlem, where Bayley was rector after his Episcopalian ordination

In Harlem, Bayley had the opportunity, probably for the first time, of conversing with Catholic priests and arguing with them on such controversial questions as papal primacy and the validity of Episcopalian holy orders, which Catholic theologians denied. While acting as rector of St. Andrew's, he often received money to be distributed among the poor, and since there were no poor in his own parish, Bayley directed his ministry to the poor Irish immigrants of the city, who were overwhelmingly Catholic. It was on one of these visits that he met Father Michael Curran, the pastor of St. Paul's, Harlem, who later stated that "he had helped into the Church his neighbor, the Protestant rector of St. Andrew's, the Rev. J. R. Bayley."

Another Catholic priest whom he met was the pastor of St. Joseph's Church, Father John McCloskey (later Archbishop of New York and the first American cardinal), who was four years Bayley's senior. Bayley time and again stopped in at St. Joseph's rectory or at St. John's College, of which Father McCloskey became president in 1841, in order to discuss the doubts which were worrying him in regard to doctrinal questions and to seek light on the validity of his orders. After many such discussions, it became apparent to McCloskey that his friend "was on the verge of becoming a Catholic but that he hesitated to take the step." Bayley said one day, "I am convinced, but when I come to make the change, I grow cowardly." Once as they walked toward the gate, on being questioned about his hesitancy when he knew it was his duty, Mr. Bayley stopped Father McCloskey and by way of illustrating his mental state, pointed to a wide ditch that flanked the grounds and said, "My condition is this: I could, I know, jump that ditch, wide as it is; but I would not attempt it unless hard pressed. I have not the courage now."

=== Journey to Rome and conversion ===
In the fall of 1841, Bayley resigned his rectorship, and his grandfather, alarmed at his evident inclination for the Catholic religion, decided to send him to Rome, hoping that what Roosevelt considered the corruption and superstition to be seen in Rome would disabuse Bayley of his attraction to Rome's religion. Father McCloskey gave Bayley advice about travelling to Rome and two letters of introduction, probably addressed to the rector of the Pontifical Irish College, Paul Cullen, and the rector of the English College, Dr. Baggs. On the morning of December 8, his father and two of his brothers, Carleton and William, accompanied him to the wharf where he boarded the packet ship Emerald, bound for Le Havre. The three weeks' voyage was uneventful except for severe seasickness, from which he suffered the first week. One heavy gale was encountered during which the ship was obliged "to lay under storm-sails."

Bayley started immediately for Paris, breaking the stage coach ride at Rouen and reveling in its antiquities. He wrote in a journal that he kept during this journey, "Never have I passed a more delightful day." He arrived in the French capital at eight o'clock on a Friday morning after an all night's ride in a diligence. The following Sunday he went to Church in the English chapel, a practice to which he adhered until his reception into the Catholic Church. During his two weeks in Paris, Roosevelt Bayley visited all the usual places of interest, including the tomb of Abelard and Héloïse at Père Lachaise Cemetery, the Hôtel de Sully, "the truly noble galleries of the Louvre," and "the Chh. of the Pantheon most magnificent" as well as the Basilica of Saint-Denis. On another day, he traveled by railroad to see the Palace of Versailles, "so interesting for the associations it brings to mind of Louis XIV and his court," which recent renovations by King Louis Philippe I made "one of the most delightful visiting places about Paris." One of the most memorable days was the Tuesday he spent in the Bibliothèque Royale, "though saddened by the thought that I could only walk thro' it, without being permitted to linger days and weeks as I would like to do among its noble rooms, covered with the choicest treasures of Bibliography." Bayley wrote,

"It would take up my whole book to record what I saw as at every turn the eye rests upon some treasure, hitherto only read of, without the hope of ever being looked upon ... many days shall be spent there, if I ever return to Paris."

Bayley continued to Lyon and then Avignon, where he visited the Palais des Papes. From Marseille he sailed to Genoa, and finding two Americans from New York State among the passengers, a Mr. Gale and Mr. Robinson, he visited palaces in their company, as well as many of the churches, in which Bayley noticed that "the number of people at their devotions was very great and apparently fervent and serious." From Genoa, he sailed to Leghorn, where he visited family friends, the Filicchis. Antonio Filicchi himself was ill at the time, but his son and daughter spoke to the young American very kindly of his dear cousin, Catherine Seton. On his way back to the hotel, he stopped at the English cemetery and located the grave of his uncle, William Magee Seton, noting that the tomb was "in a good state of preservation and the sides whh. support the slab, look as if they had been lately repaired and plastered." The next day, Patrizio Filicchi showed him the house where his uncle, Filippo Filicchi, lived when Guy Carleton Bayley was with him in the Via Borgo.

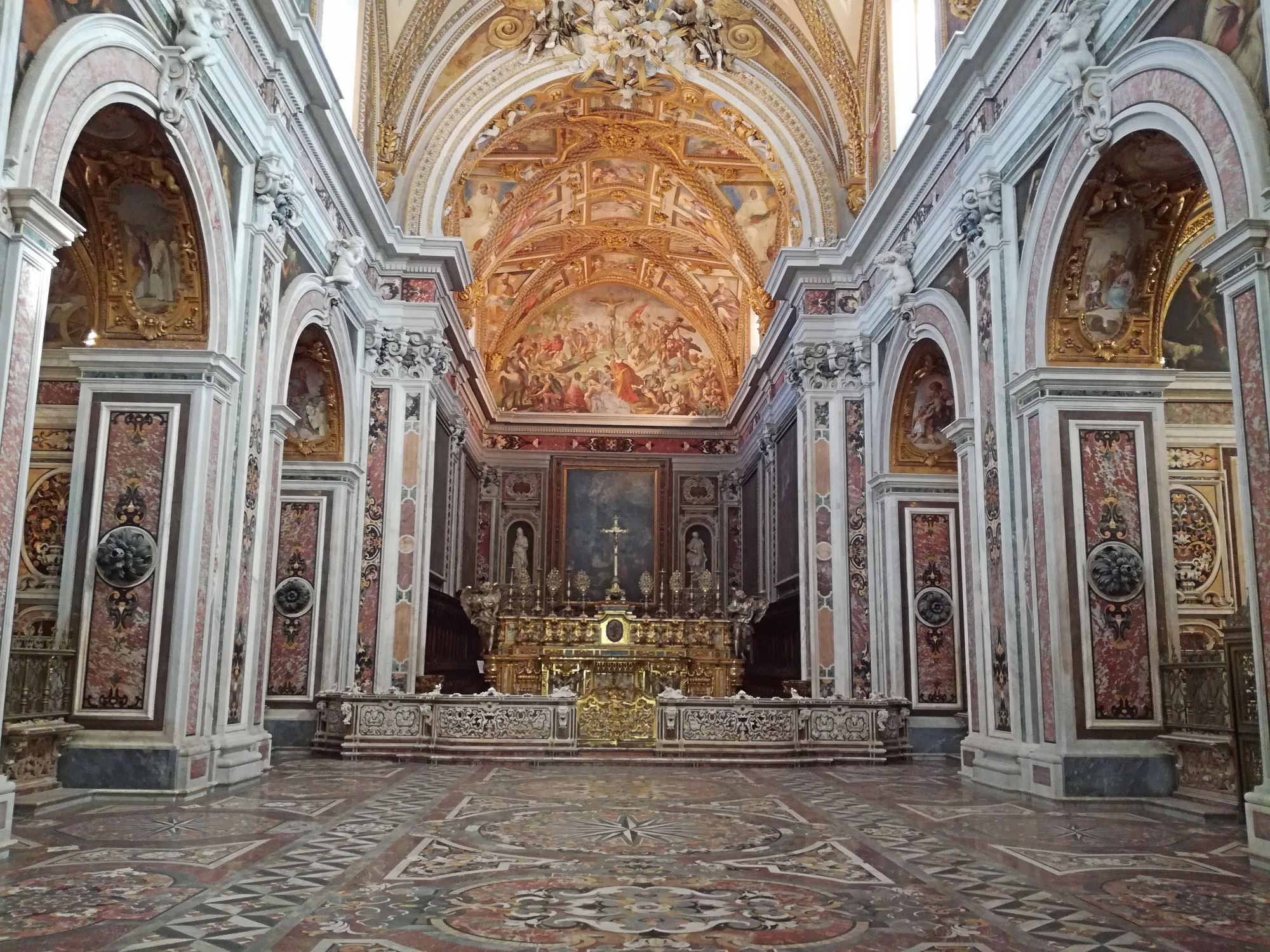
The main church of the Certosa di San Martino, which impressed Bayley as the most beautiful in Naples

After a stormy voyage he arrived in Naples on February 2, where he met again his new friends, Gale and Robinson. Together they visited the more frequented parts of the city, which was then "all alive with the gaieties of the Carnival." His interest in the remains of ancient times was deepened by the visit he made with some other Americans to the museum of antiquities at Herculaneum. Bayley declared the church of the Certosa di San Martino "the most beautiful in Naples," writing in his diary, "those old monks had a good taste in these matters." On February 8, he and his two American friends and a young English clergyman named Clarke climbed Mount Vesuvius. Two days later, Bayley made an excursion to Salerno, and several days later he and Mr. Clarke went on a similar expedition to the "famed shores of Baiae" west of Naples, with Bayley writing in his journal, "Never have I passed a day of more true and unmingled enjoyment."

But his mind was not entirely occupied with antiquities and classical lore. The Sunday before, he and the young English curate had spent the time between morning and evening services "in wandering thro' the shady part of the Terra Reale engaged in converse on Theology, Catholic claims, etc." Although he was sorely tempted to join Clarke and a companion on a journey to Jerusalem, where the Christian religion was founded, he resisted the invitation, confiding to his journal: "as I started for Rome, to Rome I must go in the first place." After a pleasant two days' tour with agreeable companions which had taken him through Capua and over the Campagna along the route of the Via Appia, he arrived in Rome on the afternoon of Thursday, February 24, 1842. The Sunday following he went in the afternoon to hear Dr. Baggs preach at "St. Maria," and the next day he took his letter of introduction to Dr. Paul Cullen, who received him kindly and helped him to find private lodgings in the city.

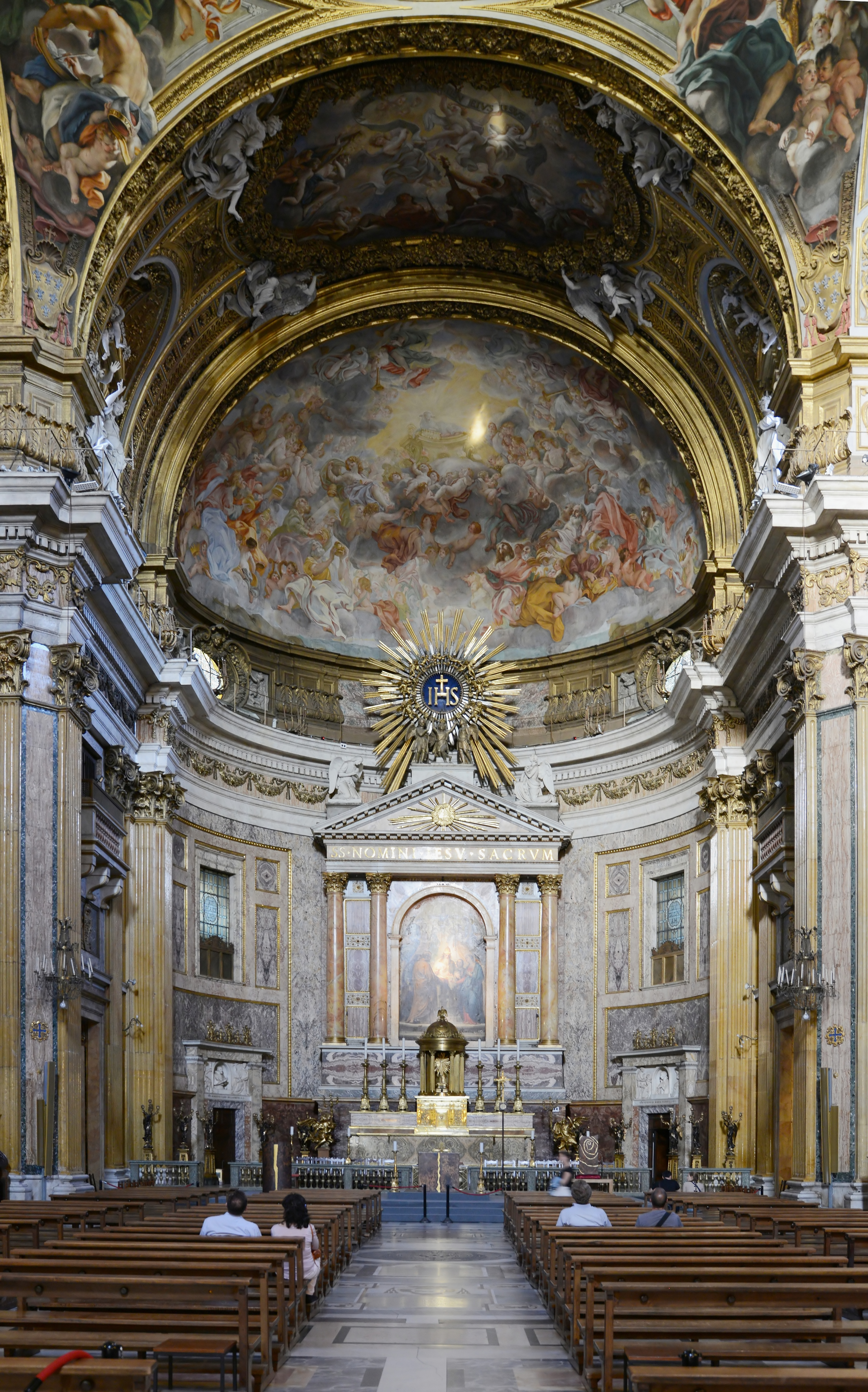
The nave and main altar of the Church of the Gesù in Rome, where Bayley was received into the Catholic Church

Bayley missed few, if any of the places of interest in Rome, visiting St. Peter's Basilica, Sant'Agnese fuori le mura, the Archbasilica of Saint John Lateran, and other Roman churches, as well as the Etruscan and Egyptian galleries in the Vatican Museums and "the noble and magnificent Bibliotheca," and recording his reactions in his journal. On March 10, he visited the English College and met Dr. Baggs, who gave him a letter of introduction to a converted Episcopal clergyman from Boston, Massachusetts, George L. Haskins, who became a lifelong friend. One day in April, as Bayley spoke to Haskins about his persistent doubts between Catholicism and Protestantism, Haskins offered to secure a room for Bayley at the Church of the Gesù where he could "make a retreat and humbly implore the illumination of the Holy Spirit." On April 19, Bayley began a retreat at the Gesù according to the Spiritual Exercises of St. Ignatius of Loyola under the direction of Bartholomew Esmonde. On the evening of the 25th and morning of the 26th, Bayley made a general confession of the sins of his life and received a conditional baptism, and on April 28, 1842, he received confirmation, and made his first Communion from the hands of Cardinal Fransoni.

Bayley and Haskins remained in Rome for more than a month. Together, they visited the rooms that had been occupied by St. Philip Neri, St. Stanislaus Kostka, and St. Aloysius Gonzaga, with Bayley writing in his journal, "there are no places in Rome that I have visited with more pleasure than such spots hallowed by the memory of departed virtue." They also paid a number of visits to the Urban College of the Propaganda, where Bayley became friends with William O'Hara, James Andrew Corcoran, and his fellow convert James Frederick Wood. On one occasion, Bayley and Haskins went to the room of Giovanni Perrone at the Roman College and spent "a short time in very pleasant conversation with him." On another day, they paid a visit to Giuseppe Mezzofanti, famed for his fluency in thirty-eight languages, who impressed Bayley as "a humble minded good old man." On May 30, accompanied by Father Esmonde, they went for an audience with Pope Gregory XVI.

The two friends left Rome on Tuesday, June 7. On the last evening, Bayley confided to his journal that at the thought of leaving "my heart fairly misgave me, but I have duties to perform and must linger here no longer." They left in the morning for Assisi where they visited the tomb of St. Francis, and went on to Florence, where they visited the many sites of historical and cultural interest, such as the Basilica of Santa Croce and the Cathedral of Santa Maria del Fiore. Before leaving Florence, he wrote: "If I had no duties to perform in this world, and no other to prepare for, I would like to spend the remainder of my days under its bright sky and among its happy and lively people." Parting from Haskins, who went to Paris by another route, Bayley left Florence alone on June 28 for Venice, and after again having missed nothing of interest to the sightseer, left Venice on July 8 for Milan, going on to Lake Como, Lausanne, and Geneva, from which he made an excursion with several other tourists to the Chamonix valley, where Bayley considered the beauty of the sunset over Mont Blanc worthy of a voyage across the Atlantic to see. Bayley continued to Dijon and arrived back in Paris on August 2. From Paris, Bayley wrote to coadjutor bishop John Hughes informing him of his intention to study for the Catholic priesthood and asking his advice and commands.

=== Catholic seminarian ===
Bayley moved into a room at the Seminary of Saint-Sulpice on August 5, 1842. In Paris, he found a large bundle of letters from his family waiting for him at the banker's. His Catholic cousin Catherine wrote that when the family received the letter Bayley had sent to his grandmother from Rome explaining his decision to convert, she left the room, not wishing to see the sorrow that "this best brightest blessing that has ever descended upon her family" would cause their aunt Helen Bayley Craig, who was afterwards "shut in her bed-room no doubt mourning over the contents" of the letter, where Catherine, after waiting a while, "ventured in" to console her. She related to Bayley that his father "bears the matter I fancy very philosophically for he has gone out to fish." She expressed optimism that Aunt Craig and Dr. Bayley would also convert to Catholicism, urging Roosevelt Bayley to write to his aunt giving a brief sketch of the reasons for his decision, as "I think Aunt is in just such a state of mind now that you may readily accomplish a miracle of divine grace". In his reply, Bayley attributed the grace of his conversion to the intercession in heaven of her saintly mother, his aunt Elizabeth Ann Seton.

After an eight-day retreat which began on October 11, 1842, Bayley began his theological studies at Saint-Sulpice. William Henry Elder of Baltimore, on his way to study at the Propaganda in Rome, visited and had a conversation with Bayley in which he told him "many things of the Convent of St. Joseph's" founded by Mother Seton at Emmitsburg, Maryland. On March 22, 1843, Bayley wrote to the superior of the house, Mother Mary Xavier Clarke, telling the sisters there that he attributed his conversion chiefly to the prayers of Mother Seton and asking them to pray for the conversion of his father, brothers, and sister, and Aunt Craig and her family. In August, Bishop Hughes visited the seminary, and Bayley met him in person for the first time. After "several pleasant visits" with Hughes at the residence of Bishop de Forbin-Janson, Bayley recorded, "I believe I will like him hugely." Hughes wished for Bayley to return to New York to complete his studies at St. John's College (Fordham University after 1907) in Fordham.

Leaving the seminary on the evening of August 17, Bayley traveled through Douai, Brussels, Antwerp, and Amsterdam seeking rare books Bishop Hughes wished him to purchase for the episcopal library, and sailed from Rotterdam on August 29 for London. Bayley spent the greater part of two weeks seeing the sights of London such as Westminster Abbey and Windsor Castle, during which he paid several visits to the offices of The Tablet and to its editor, Frederick Lucas. Bayley visited Oxford on September 14, and arriving in Birmingham on September 17, he crossed paths again with Bishop Hughes. Together they visited Nicholas Wiseman at Oscott College, and Bayley met several of those who had converted from Anglicanism to Catholicism under the influence of the Oxford movement, whose names he did not record. While Hughes left for America, Bayley remained to make a tour of Scotland and Ireland, where he heard Daniel O'Connell speak several times in Dublin. Returning from Ireland to Liverpool, Bayley sailed for New York on October 3, 1843.

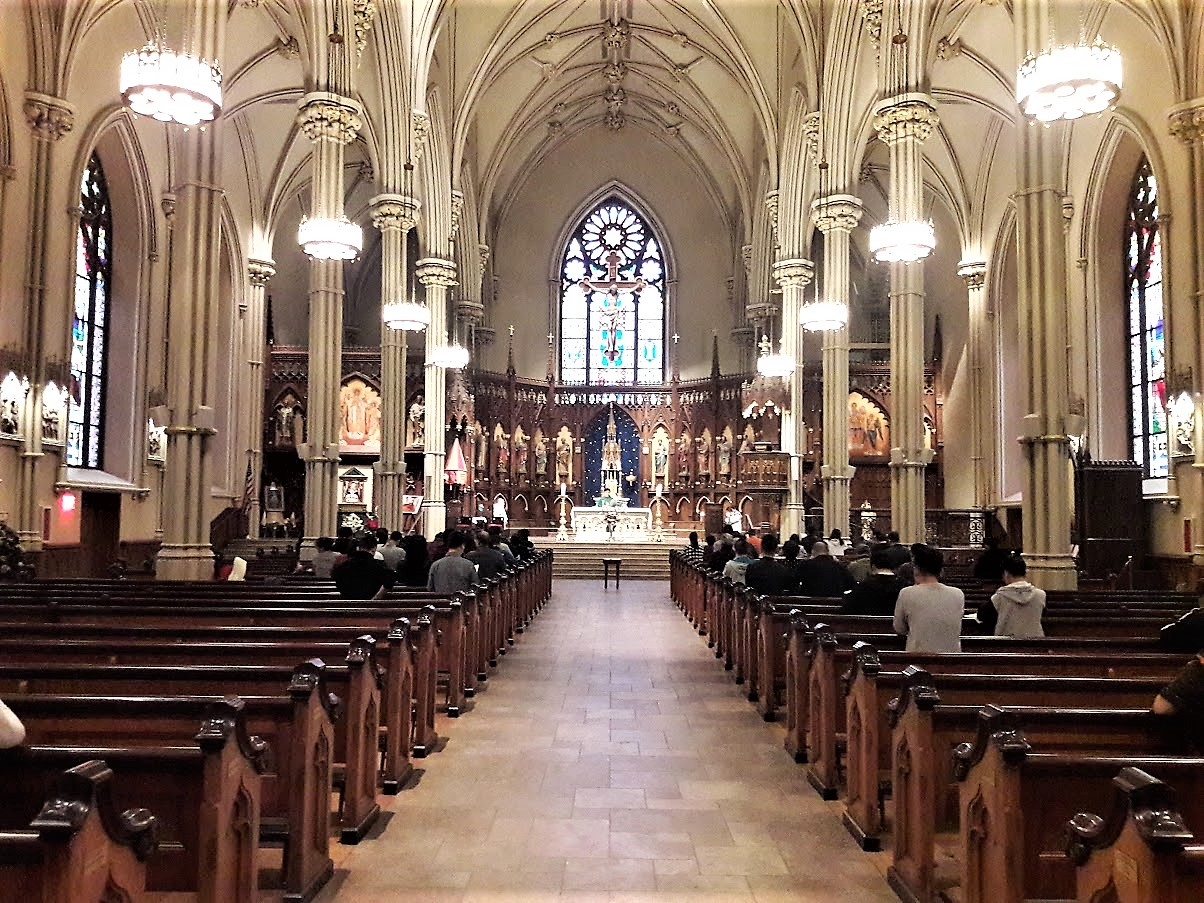
The interior of old St. Patrick's Cathedral, where Bayley was ordained a priest in 1844 and a bishop in 1853

After a five weeks' voyage, they neared the coast of New Jersey in the midst of a storm and took on a pilot on Saturday morning, November 11. Two hours after making the Navesink lighthouses, the ship struck so heavily on the shoals that there was no way of getting her off. The passengers and crew prepared themselves, observed Bayley, "for what men call the worst and awaited the end." Fortunately, the ship continued afloat until one o'clock Sunday morning when a steamer from Staten Island came to their rescue, and the passengers reached New York City soon after dawn on Sunday, November 12, 1843, nearly two years after Bayley's departure. After spending a couple of weeks visiting his relations and friends, he resumed his studies at St. John's. During the ember days of Lent, 1844, he received the tonsure and minor orders, the subdiaconate on February 28, and the diaconate on Friday, March 1. He was ordained a priest on March 2, 1844, by Bishop Hughes in St. Patrick's Old Cathedral. A week later, he was present in the cathedral on March 10 for the consecration of his old friend, John McCloskey, as the Coadjutor Bishop of New York.

== Catholic priesthood ==
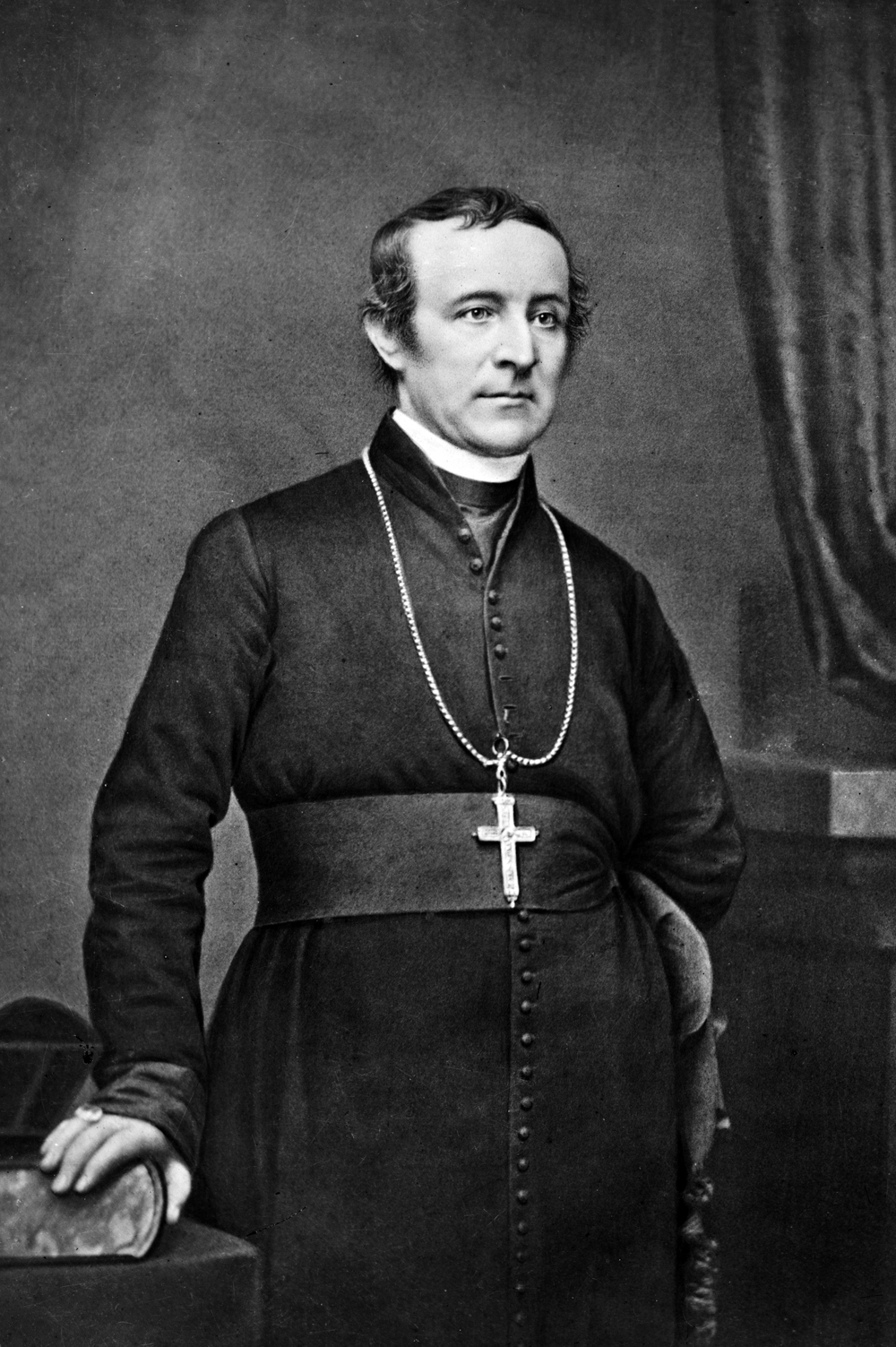
John Hughes, fourth Bishop and first Archbishop of New York, who ordained Bayley to the priesthood in 1844, and to whom Bayley served as private secretary from 1846 to 1853

In his will, Bayley's maternal grandfather, after special bequests to his wife and several others, had left half of his residuary estate to his son Isaac, and the remaining half to be divided equally among his five Bayley grandchildren, according to a second codicil of August 16, 1842. In a third codicil dated March 8, 1844, six days after Bayley's ordination, Roosevelt stated that "as I deem it neither just nor right that any part of the property should be instrumental in building up a faith which I think erroneous and unholy," he disinherited his grandson, bequeathing his one-tenth share of the estate to the Union Theological Seminary instead. This inheritance amounted to about $70,000 (equivalent to $2,700,000 in 2025). After his grandfather died on February 6, 1847, Bayley contested the will in court, alleging that the codicil referred to a part of the will which had already been revoked when the codicil was executed, and the codicil was therefore inoperative. The Superior Court decided partially in Bayley's favor in September 1849, awarding him $32,000. However, this decision was reversed by the Court of Appeals, depriving Bayley of his entire inheritance.

As John J. Conroy had been appointed to St. Joseph's Church in Albany, Bishop Hughes appointed Bayley to replace him as vice-president of St. John's College, where he also served as professor of rhetoric and belles-lettres. He began his duties on April 1, and at the same time assumed responsibility for missionary stations in New Rochelle and Port Chester, each of which he visited once a month. In the following school year, he took on the additional duties of acting as prefect of discipline for the seminarians and of lecturing on Holy Scripture.

Early in 1845, Bayley had the opportunity of visiting Mount Saint Mary's and St. Joseph's in Emmitsburg, where Mother Xavier introduced him to the assembled community, and he spoke to them about his affectionate devotion to the memory of his revered aunt, Mother Seton. The next day, Sister Sally Thompson, one of the seven women who had first come there with Mother Seton in 1809, showed him around the premises and pointed out every interesting spot, such as the room where Mother Seton died and her grave in the cemetery. "The memory of her virtues is as fresh as if she had left them but yesterday," Bayley wrote, "and all spoke of them in that simple unaffected manner that showed they had left an impression on their hearts never to be effaced—'the memory of the good is as a sweet odour.'"

The next two years were busy ones. The president of St. John's, John B. Harley, was absent a great part of the time—first on fundraising tours for the new seminary, and then because of illness—and much of his work devolved upon Bayley. When in November 1845 Bishop Hughes took Harley with him to Europe in an attempt to restore his health, the full responsibility of carrying out the bishop's plans for St. John's fell upon Bayley. That winter, Bayley made a trip to Albany and secured a charter for St. John's from the New York State Legislature, granting them full university powers. In July 1846, Bishop Hughes transferred St. John's to the Society of Jesus, and Bayley was appointed to the parish in New Brighton, Staten Island, which included responsibility for a station once a month at Richmond and attendance at the large Quarantine Hospital given over then to victims of typhus.

Upon Father Harley's death on December 8, 1846, however, Hughes summoned Bayley to replace him as his private secretary. Shortly after Bayley assumed his duties as episcopal secretary, he was charged with an added responsibility, that of being "a sort of overseeing editor of the Freeman's Journal," which Bishop Hughes had taken over in 1842. In 1846, Hughes took over the direct management—appointing Bayley to take charge of it—in order to establish it on a solid financial basis. Bayley did some little writing and attended to the business affairs of the paper, but the main work was done by James McMaster, who made an excellent editor. The bishop's object having been accomplished through Bayley's efforts, the paper was sold to McMaster in 1848.

In May 1852, Bayley accompanied Hughes to the First Plenary Council of Baltimore, where the American bishops decided to erect a number of new dioceses. On July 29, 1853, Pope Pius IX established the Diocese of Newark, and named Bayley as its bishop. The diocese was to embrace the whole state of New Jersey, which had previously been divided between the Diocese of Philadelphia and the Archdiocese of New York. On October 11, Bayley wrote to Cardinal Fransoni acknowledging the reception of the bulls and accepting the nomination.

Two other newly erected sees, the Diocese of Brooklyn and the Diocese of Burlington, had also been made suffragans of New York, newly raised to the status of an archdiocese, and so it was fitting that the three bishops-elect should be consecrated in the metropolitan cathedral, the first occurrence of such an elaborate ceremony in the United States. Bayley and his fellow suffragans John Loughlin and Louis de Goesbriand were consecrated October 30, 1853, in old St. Patrick's Cathedral, New York, by Archbishop Gaetano Bedini, the Apostolic Nuncio to Brazil, who was then en route to Rome. Bishops John McCloskey of Albany and Amadeus Rappe of Cleveland assisted as co-consecrators.

== First Bishop of Newark ==
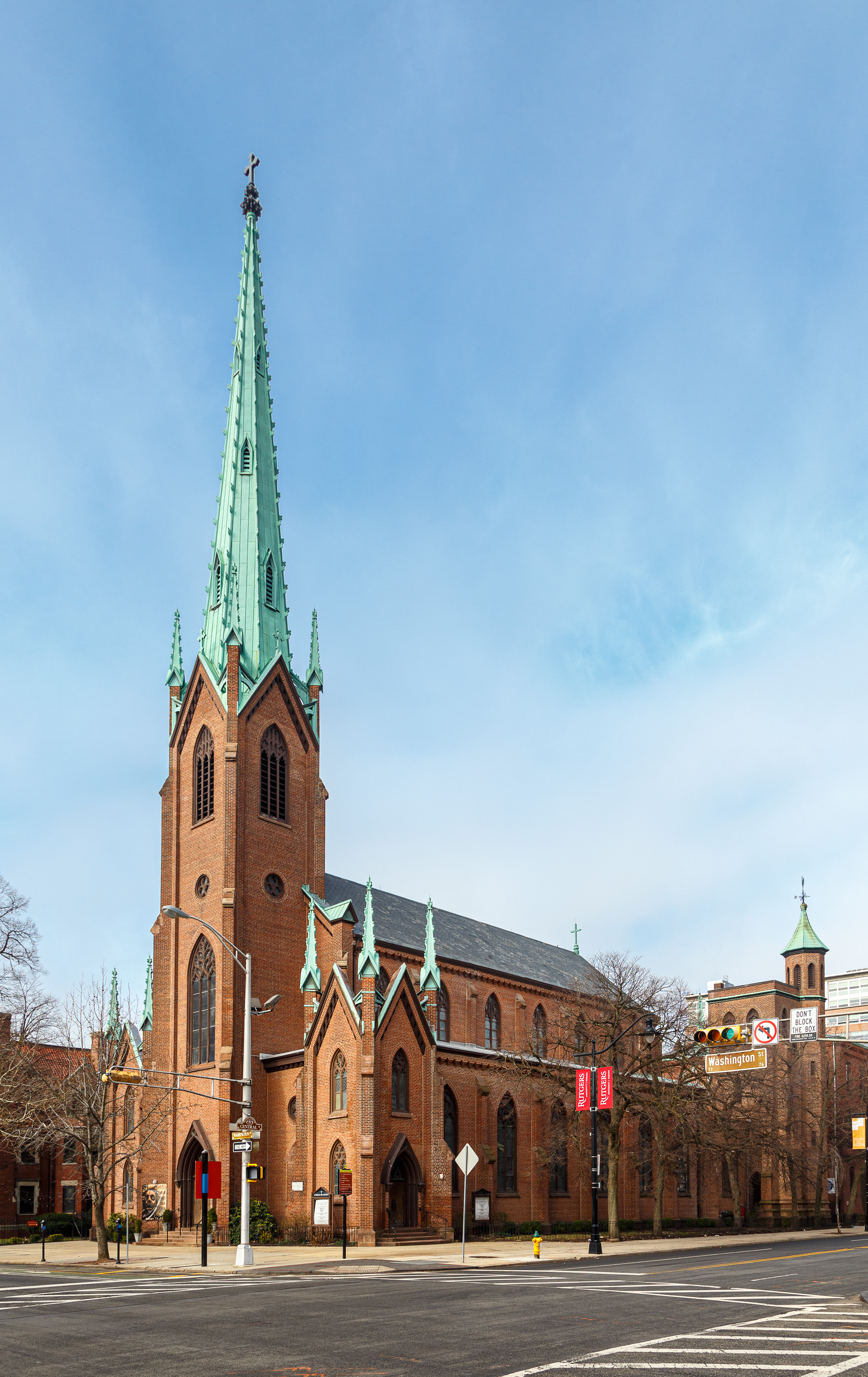
St. Patrick's Church, Newark, where Bayley took possession of his see on November 1, 1853

Bayley was installed as bishop at St. Patrick's Church, which had been designated as the cathedral of the new diocese, at a ceremony organized by the newly appointed cathedral rector Bernard J. McQuaid on November 1, 1853. The solemn high Mass was celebrated by J. W. Cummings, Bayley's friend since the spring of 1842 in Rome, after which Father McQuaid provided a banquet for the bishop and more than fifty clergy who had attended the ceremonies.

Bayley's work of organizing the diocese was not easy. The 1850 United States census counted 22 Catholic churches in New Jersey with accommodations for 9,485 worshipers, and the Metropolitan Catholic Almanac for 1854 reported the diocese had 33 churches attended by 30 clergymen. In August 1855, Bayley estimated the number of Catholics in the diocese at 40,000, for the most part Irish and Germans. It did not take him long to realize that the ever-increasing, poor, immigrant population was in no position at the time to bear the full burden of supporting those few churches which had been provided and of financing the much-needed additional ones and the other requisite institutions to care for their wants. He therefore applied for help to the European missionary societies, directing his first appeal to the Society for the Propagation of the Faith of Lyon, France in June, 1854. The Society answered his appeal with a remittance of 4,100 francs, and a total of 15,000 francs was allocated to the diocese during 1855. He also received material assistance from the Leopoldine Society.

Bayley's mission for the fledgling Diocese was to establish Catholic education. He had written just prior to leaving New York, "In our present position, the school-house has become second in importance to the House of God itself", and in a letter to one of his clergy in May 1854, he expressed the hope that soon he would have "every Catholic child in the State in Catholic schools." Bayley realized that in order to be effective in his mission he needed the help of a Diocesan community; as he put it, "no one can fill that most important office so effectually as religious women." In 1857 a group of Benedictine Sisters arrived from Pennsylvania and in the following year, Bayley sent five women to train with the Sisters of Charity. Many other communities of religious men and women joined the Diocese in the next decades.

Bayley saw need for a Catholic college, and on September 1, 1856, the need was filled by the opening of Chegary Academy (Old Seton Hall) in Madison. In 1860 the school moved to its present location in South Orange and was incorporated into a college by the state of New Jersey in 1861. The college also had a seminary which was necessary for educating new priests. Despite the original need, the number of new recruits exceeded the abilities of the seminary. Bayley was instrumental in the founding of the North American College in Rome at the request of Pope Pius IX, where he sent a young seminarian by the name of Michael Corrigan.

In a letter Bayley wrote on April 10, 1865, reviewing the condition of the diocese after his first ten years there he says:

I find that while the Catholic population has increased a third, the churches and priests have doubled in number. In 1854 there was no religious community. Now we have a monastery of Benedictines, another of Passionists, a mother-house of Sisters of Charity, conducting seventeen different establishments; two convents of Benedictine nuns, two others of German Sisters of Notre Dame and two others of the Sisters of the Poor of St. Francis. In 1854 there was no institution of learning; to-day we have a flourishing college and a diocesan seminary, an academy for young ladies, a boarding school for boys, and parish schools attached to almost all the parishes.

In addition to these he introduced the Jesuits and the Sisters of St. Joseph and of St. Dominic into the diocese.

Bayley was one of the strongest upholders of the temperance movement of the seventies. He made several journeys to Rome and the Holy Land, attending the canonization of the Japanese martyrs at Rome in 1862; the centenary of the Apostles in 1867; and the ecumenical Council in 1869. In 1871, Bishop Bayley, realizing that continuous waves of European Catholic immigrants had rendered his cathedral on Washington Avenue in Newark (St. Patrick's) too small, purchased land on the highest spot in the city where his successors subsequently built Sacred Heart Cathedral Basilica. It was dedicated decades later, in 1954.

Bishop Bayley served the developing Diocese for 19 years until he was appointed Archbishop of Baltimore on July 30, 1872.

== Archbishop of Baltimore ==
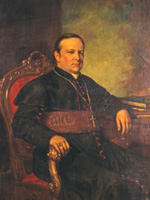
Archbishop Bayley portrait, circa 1876

At the death of Archbishop Spalding of Baltimore, Bayley was promoted, on July 30, 1872, to succeed that prelate. He left Newark with much reluctance. In 1875 as Apostolic Delegate he imposed the cardinal's biretta on Archbishop John McCloskey of New York. In May, 1876, he consecrated the Baltimore cathedral, having freed it from debt.

Convening the Eighth Provincial Synod of the clergy in August 1875, Bayley enacted many salutary regulations, particularly with regard to clerical dress, mixed marriages, and church music. Illness obliged him to ask for a coadjutor and Bishop James Gibbons of Richmond was appointed to that position on May 29, 1877. The archbishop then went abroad to seek for relief but in vain. He returned to his former home in Newark in August 1877 and after lingering for two months died in his old room, where he had labored for so long, on October 3, 1877.

Shortly before Bayley died he spoke of himself by saying, "I am Archbishop; I have been Bishop; but I like Father Bayley best of all." At his own request he was buried beside his aunt, Mother Seton, at the convent at Emmitsburg, Maryland.

In conversation, Bayley once told the ultramontane Bishop Michael Corrigan that before his conversion he thought of becoming a Jesuit, and before his consecration a Redemptorist, but from both intentions his director dissuaded him.

== Writings ==
=== History of the Catholic Church on the Island of New York ===
Bibliography and history had attracted him from his student days. Early in his priestly career, he had realized the need of gathering and preserving historical and bibliographical data for the time when the history of the Church in the United States would be written. His friend John Gilmary Shea stated that as secretary to John Hughes he did much "to rescue the archives of the diocese and draw up lists of the clergy, ordination, and the like." On January 26, 1848, Bayley sent a circular letter to the priests of the Diocese of New York asking in Bishop Hughes' name that they submit information on the history of the diocese, such as when, where, and by whom the first Mass was celebrated in the district under their jurisdiction, when and where the first church was built, and the probable number of Catholics under their care at that time. He published A Brief Sketch of the Early History of the Catholic Church on the Island of New York in December, 1853. As he explained in the preface, written but a week before he left for Newark, "Though believed to be accurate as far as it goes, it does not pretend to be a full and complete history of the rise and progress of Catholicity on the island, but rather an attempt to call attention to the subject." John Gilmary Shea wrote to Bayley in 1865 proposing to collaborate with him on an enlarged edition of the book, but Bayley's reply to this letter has not been located. In 1870, the Catholic Publication Society of New York published a "revised and enlarged" second edition which carried fuller notes and an extended appendix; but the body of the text remained substantially the same.

=== Memoirs of Simon Gabriel Bruté ===
In addition to the volume on the Church on New York he edited the Memoirs of Simon Gabriel Brute, First Bishop of Vincennes (New York, 1860), about Simon Bruté. In 1847, Bruté's successor, Bishop Celestine de la Hailandière, was driven by difficulties of administration to resign his see and return to his native France. While waiting in New York to sail, Bishop Hailandière prevailed on Bishop Hughes to prepare a biography of his predecessor, and provided him with a number of manuscripts which had belonged to Bruté.

Among these, Bayley found a small manuscript volume of notes and reminiscences of the French Revolution which he resolved to edit for publication. Although he initially intended to embody these in a "Life and Times of Bishop Bruté," his constant occupations did not permit him the leisure to compose such an ambitious work. Bayley prefaced these memoirs with a brief sketch of Bruté's life to draw out "a thread of narrative to string the notes on," and appended brief extracts which he had translated from Bruté's Journal which he believed were of interest "as affording glimpses behind the scenes, and indicating the changes in public opinion, as the people gradually returned to their senses." Letters from several of Bishop Bayley's friends and from admirers of Bruté indicated that the Memoirs met with a favorable reception. The book was described in The Catholic Historical Review in 1918 as "a mere scrap book hastily compiled," although "a fortunate publication," as without it "some of the most valuable writings of Bruté" would have been lost when the papers that had been collected by Paul Jausions to prepare a life of his uncle were consumed by the fire which destroyed St. Meinrad Abbey in 1887. Bayley's biographer M. Hildegarde Yeager writes that the stricture that the book was a mere scrap book hastily compiled "does not seem entirely justified", as the biographical sketch "did succeed in giving a fair idea of the man and his character", and "what was accomplished in the way of editing these valuable extracts from Bruté's papers seems to have been carefully done."

== Sources ==
- Clarke, Richard H. (1888). Lives of the Deceased Bishops of the Catholic Church in the United States. Vol. III. New York: Richard H. Clarke. pp. 43–67.
- Yeager, M. Hildegarde (1947). The Life of James Roosevelt Bayley, First Bishop of Newark and Eighth Archbishop of Baltimore, 1814–1877. Washington, D. C.: The Catholic University of America Press.

Catholic Church titles
Preceded by erected	Bishop of Newark; 1853–1872	Succeeded by Michael A. Corrigan
Preceded by Martin John Spalding	Archbishop of Baltimore; 1872–1877	Succeeded by James Gibbons
