= Alexander Seton =

Alexander Seton may refer to:

- Alexander Seton (Governor of Berwick) (fl. 1311 – 1340)
- Alexander Seton (d. 1332), nobleman
- Alexander Seton, Lord Gordon (died 1440)
- Alexander Seton, 1st Earl of Dunfermline (1555–1622)
- Alexander Seton, 1st Viscount of Kingston (1620–1691)
- Alexander Seaton (before 1626 – after 1649, also spelled Seton)
- Alexander Seton, 3rd Earl of Dunfermline (1642–1677), grandson of the 1st Earl
- Sir Alexander Seton, 1st Baronet (1639?–1719)
- Alexander Seton (priest) (died 1797), Archdeacon of Aghadoe
