= Francis Hayman =

English painter and illustrator (1708–1776)

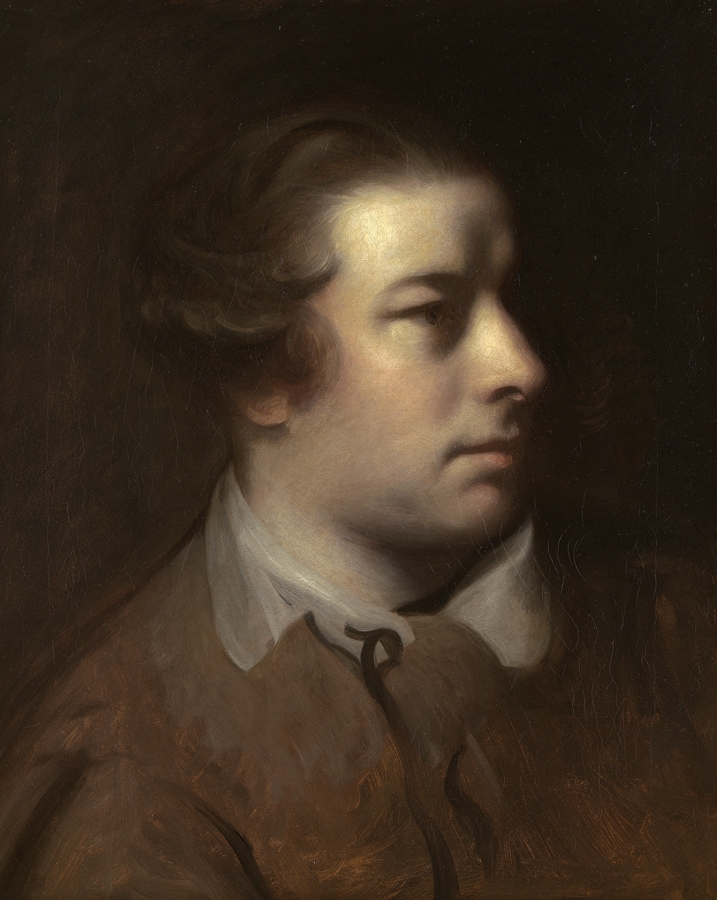
Portrait of Francis Hayman, by Sir Joshua Reynolds. Royal Albert Memorial Museum, Exeter.

Francis Hayman RA (1708 – 2 February 1776) was an English painter and illustrator who became one of the founding members of the Royal Academy in 1768, and later its first librarian.

== Life and works ==
Born in Exeter, Devon, Hayman begun his artistic career as a scene painter in London's Drury Lane theatre (where he also appeared in minor roles) before establishing a studio in St Martin's Lane.

A versatile artist influenced by the French Rococo style, he achieved some note during the 1740s through decorative paintings executed for the supper boxes at Vauxhall Pleasure Gardens in London. Hayman was also a successful portraitist and history painter.

Combining some of these, he contributed 31 pictures to a 1744 edition of Shakespeare's plays by Sir Thomas Hanmer, and later portrayed many leading contemporary actors in Shakespearean roles, including David Garrick as Richard III (1760). He also illustrated Pamela, a novel by Samuel Richardson, Milton's Paradise Lost and Paradise Regained, Tobias Smollett's translation of Don Quixote, and other well-known works. In the 1760s Hayman was commissioned by Jonathan Tyers, proprietor of Vauxhall Gardens and the Denbies estate, to paint a series of large-scale history paintings depicting British victories in the Seven Years' War.

He was an able teacher. His pupils included Mason Chamberlin, Nathaniel Dance-Holland, Thomas Seton and Lemuel Francis Abbott, and he was also a strong influence on Thomas Gainsborough.

With Joshua Reynolds, Hayman was actively involved in the formation of the Society of Artists, a forerunner of the Royal Academy, during the early 1760s.

Hayman died in 1776 and was buried in an unmarked grave in St Anne's Church, Soho.

== Gallery ==
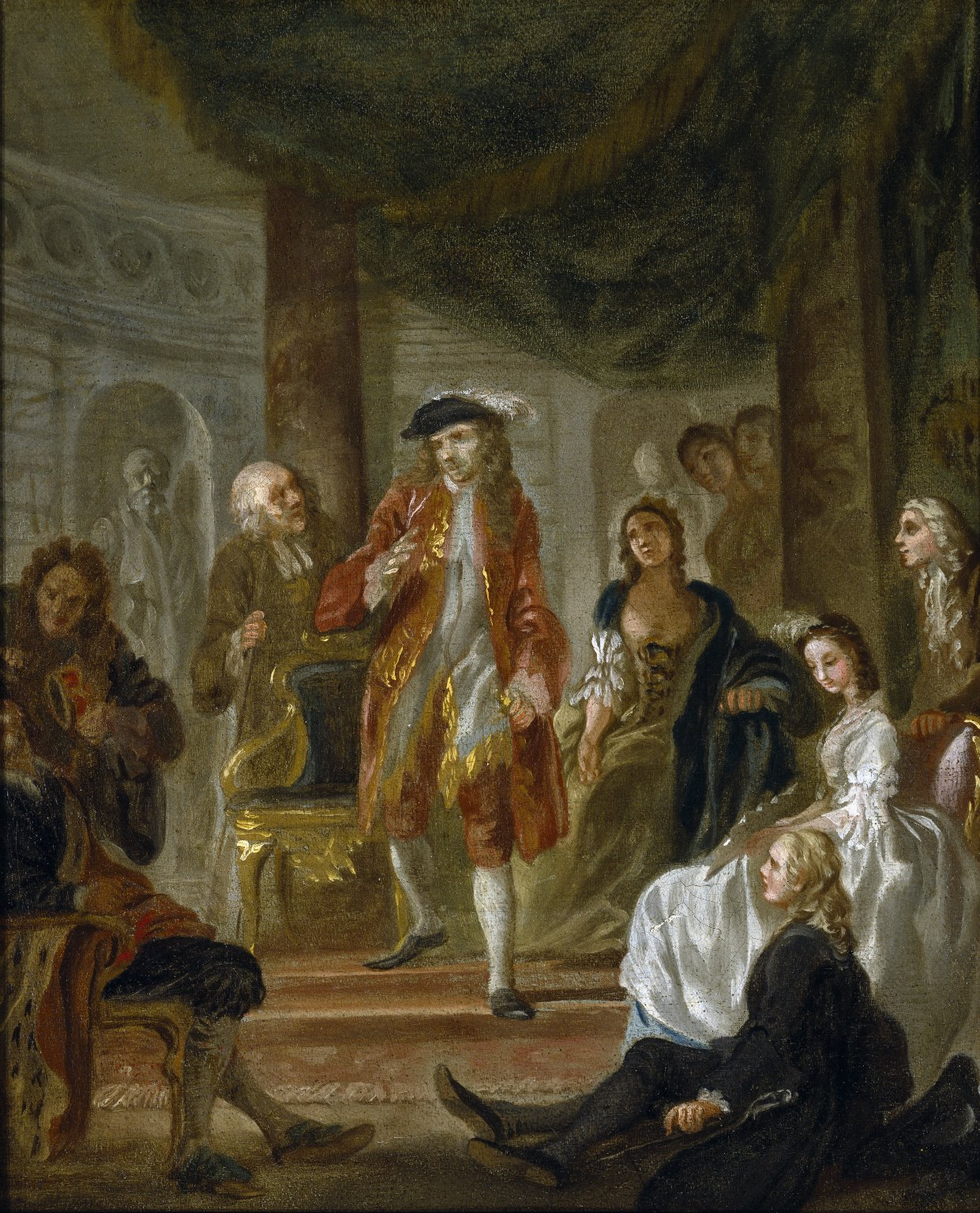
The play scene from Hamlet, c. 1745

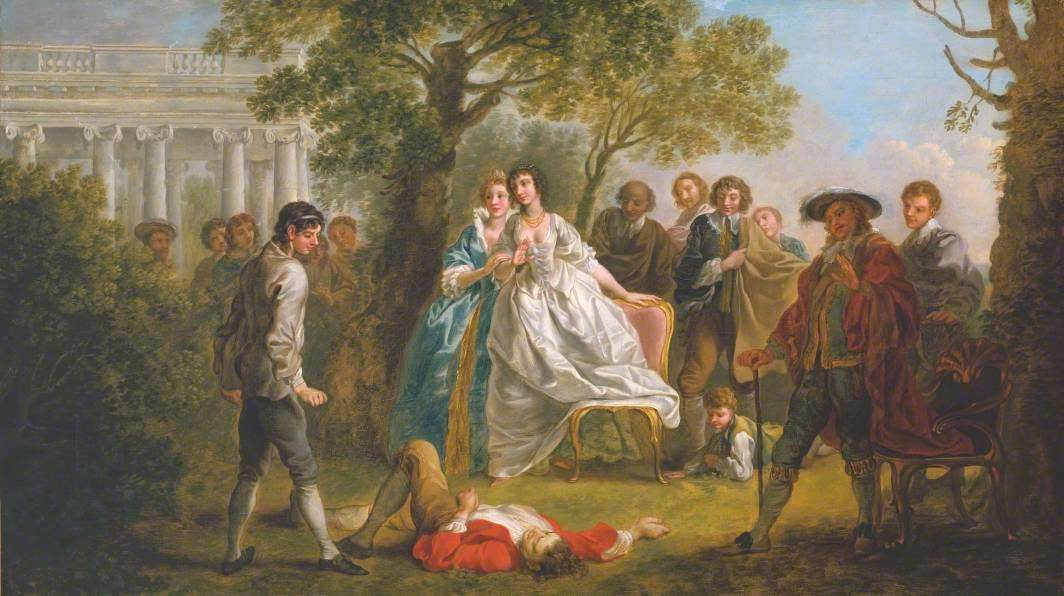
The Wrestling Scene from As You Like It, Tate, 1740-42

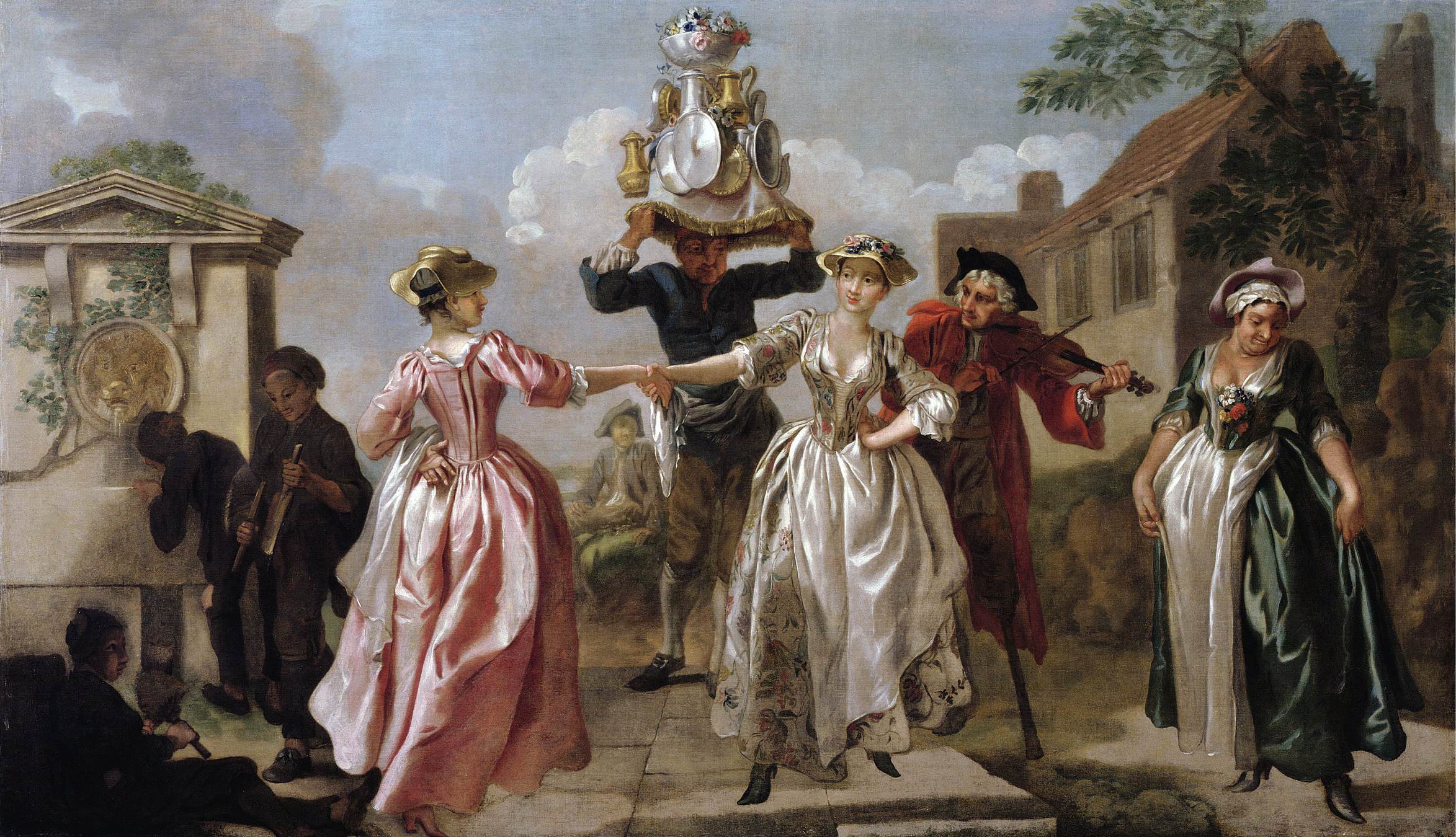
Dancing milkmaids, c. 1735. The Milkmaid's Garland, Humours of May Day, Reigen der Milchmädchen, or das Manifest

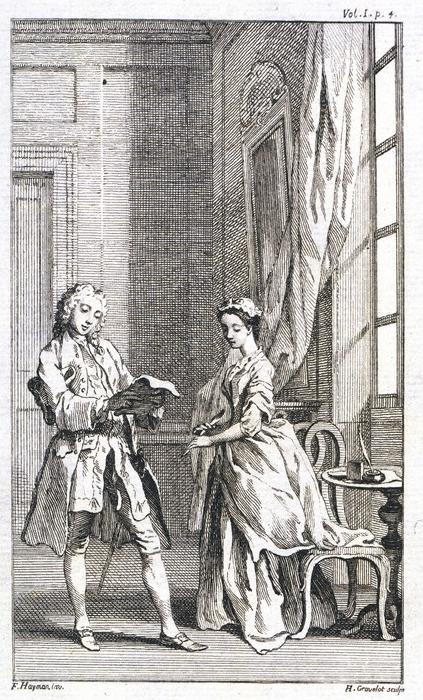
Print, 1742, V&A Museum no. 26614:53

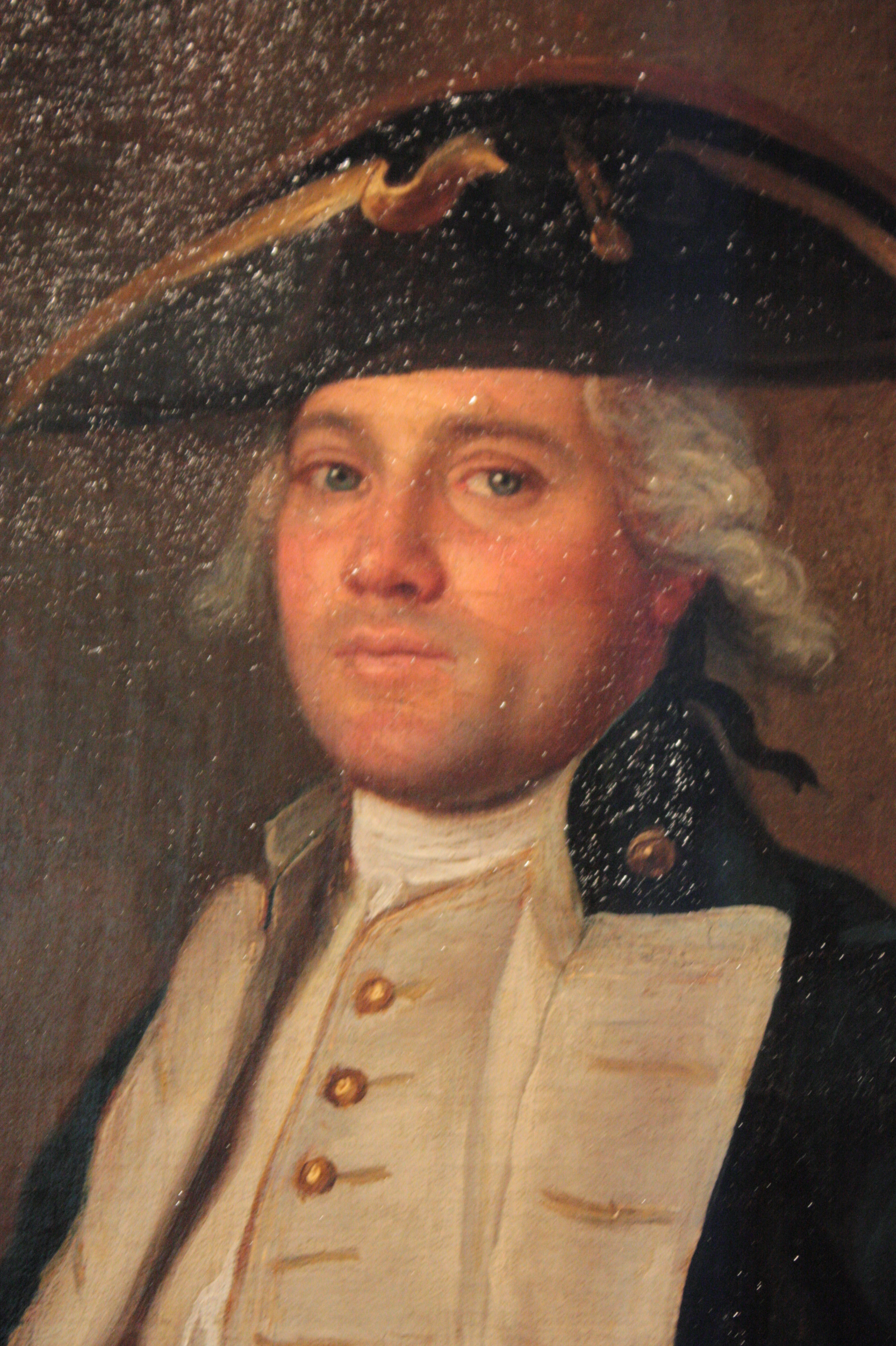
Sir Edward Vernon by Francis Hayman c.1755 (detail)

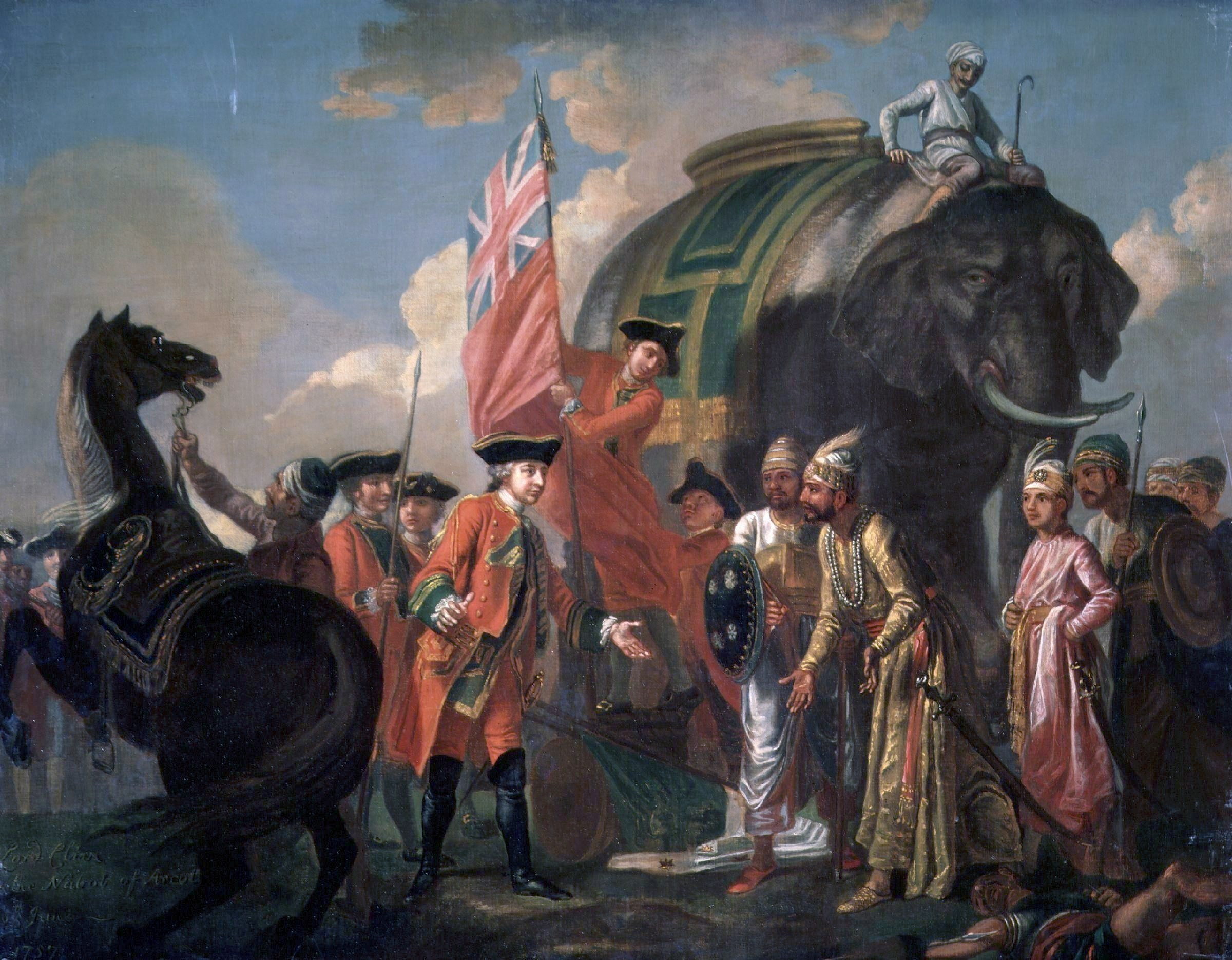
Lord Clive meeting with Mir Jafar after the Battle of Plassey in 1757 c. 1762

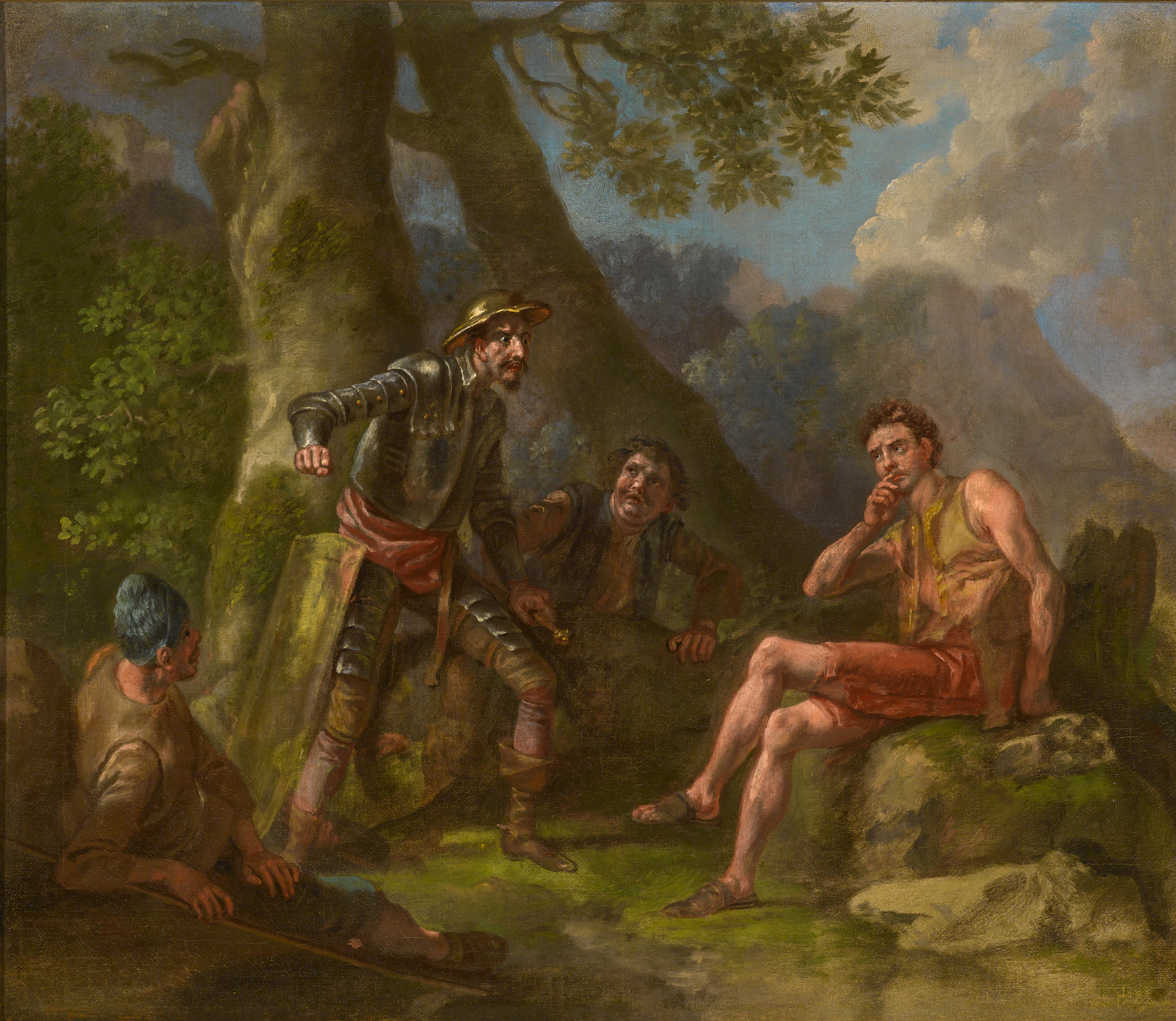
Don Quixote Disputing with the Mad Caredino, Francis Hayman, 1765 -70
