= Seton-Watson =

Seton-Watson is a surname. Notable people with the name include:

- Christopher Seton-Watson (1918–2007), Scottish historian; brother of Hugh and son of R.W.
- Hugh Seton-Watson (1916–1984), British historian and political scientist
- Robert William Seton-Watson (1879–1951), also known by the pseudonym Scotus Viator, British political activist and historian

== See also ==
- Seton (surname)
- Watson (surname)
