= Robert Seton (bishop) =

Roman Catholic archbishop (1839–1927)

His Excellency, The Most Reverend Robert Seton
- Seton in an 1893 publication
- Born: August 28, 1839; Pisa, Italy
- Died: March 22, 1927 (aged 87); Morristown, New Jersey, U.S.
- Education: Mount St. Mary's College; Academia Ecclesiastica
- Occupation: Clergyman

Robert Seton (August 28, 1839 – March 22, 1927) was an American Catholic prelate who served as Titular Archbishop of Heliopolis. He was a descendant of the aristocratic Seton and Bayley families.

== Biography ==
Robert Seton was born in Tuscany, Italy on August 28, 1839, one of nine children of William and Emily Prime Seton, seven of whom survived to adulthood. He was a grandson of Saint Elizabeth Ann Seton, nephew of Mother Mary Catherine Seton, RSM, and cousin of Archbishop James Roosevelt Bayley.

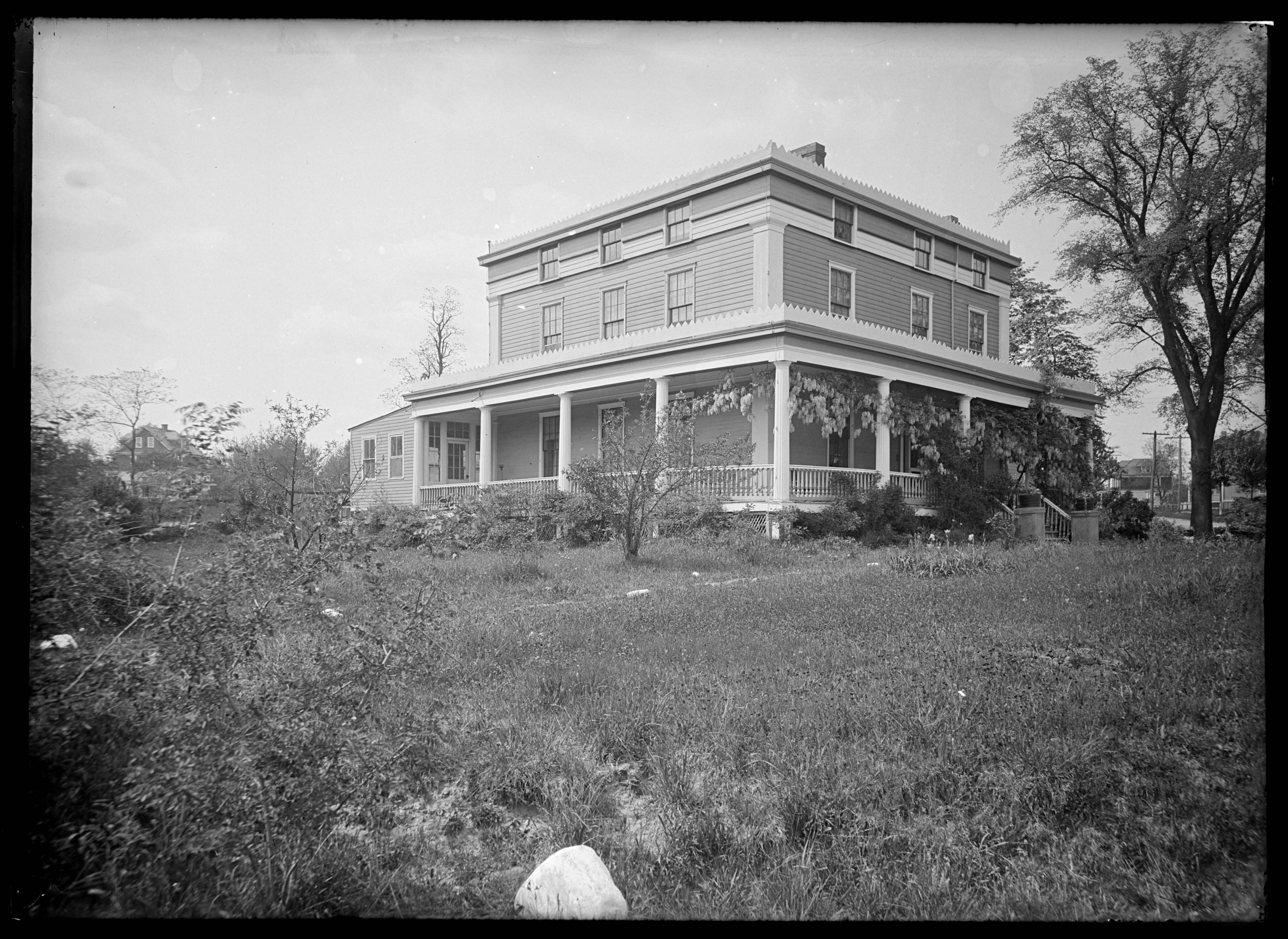
Seton Hall (the Seton family home), Eastchester, Bronx, New York City, 1913

Robert grew up at "The Cedars", an estate in the Edenwald section of The Bronx which his grandfather, banker Nathaniel Prime had given to Robert's mother, Emily. During the time of the Great Famine of Ireland, his father sent sacks of meal and flour and potatoes and barrels of apples from the estate to a relief ship loading in New York Harbor.

He was educated in Mount St. Mary's College of Emmitsburg, Maryland, and in the Academia Ecclesiastica, Rome from 1857 to 1867. He was ordained to the priesthood in Rome in 1865. He received the degree of D.D. from the Sapienza.

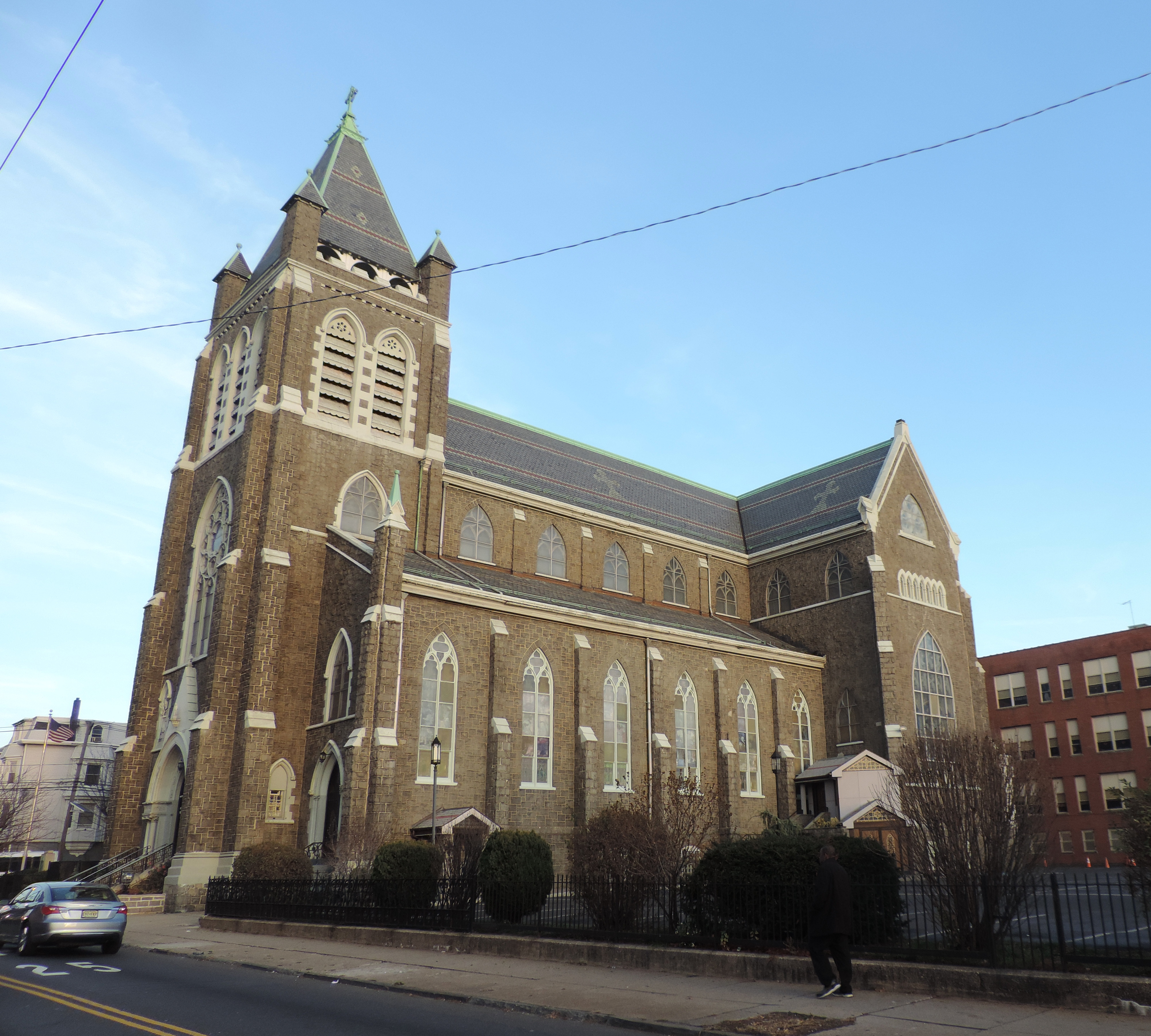
St. Joseph's Church

In 1866 he was raised to the rank of private chamberlain to Pope Pius IX. He was the first person from the United States that was honored with the Roman Prelatura, and was the dean of all the monsignori in the United States. He was made prothonotary apostolic in 1867, and chaplain to the Sisters of Charity of Saint Elizabeth at their motherhouse near Morristown.

In 1876, he became rector of St. Joseph's Church, Jersey City. He was a priest of the Diocese of Newark, New Jersey; he was a trustee of Seton Hall University. Seton returned to Rome in 1901 and was appointed Archbishop of the titular See of Heliopolis in Phoenicia by Pope Leo XIII in 1903.

Financial considerations forced a return to America, where the Sisters of Charity looked after him during his final years. Upon his retirement in 1921, Seton returned to Convent Station. He died at the College of Saint Elizabeth in Morristown, New Jersey (now Morris Township) on March 22, 1927, and is buried in Holy Sepulchre Cemetery in Newark.

== Works ==
"Robert Seton was remembered as a fairly eccentric character who made a good deal of his family background." He wrote Memoirs, Letters, and Journal of Elizabeth Seton (2 vols., New York, 1869) and Essays on Various Subjects, chiefly Roman (1882). He privately published An Old Family, the Setons of Scotland and America (1899), which is a well-researched genealogy of the Seton family. He was also a frequent contributor to Roman Catholic periodicals.
