= John Seaton (cricketer) =

English cricketer

Personal information
- Full name: John Seaton
- Born: 15 January 1844; Nottingham, Nottinghamshire, England
- Died: 14 October 1918 (aged 74); Oldham, Lancashire, England
- Batting: Right-handed
- Bowling: Right-arm medium

Domestic team information
- Years: Team
- 1872: Nottinghamshire

Career statistics
Competition	First-class
Matches	4
Runs scored	80
Batting average	11.42
100s/50s	–/–
Top score	27
Balls bowled	20
Wickets	1
Bowling average	12.00
5 wickets in innings	–
10 wickets in match	–
Best bowling	1/12
Catches/stumpings	1/–
- Source: Cricinfo, 18 February 2013

John Seaton born on 15 January 1844 and passed on 14 October 1918; was an English cricketer. Seaton was a right-handed batsman who bowled right-arm medium pace. He was born at Nottingham, Nottinghamshire.

Seaton made his first-class debut for Nottinghamshire against a combined Yorkshire in 1872 at Prince's Cricket Ground, Chelsea. He made three further first-class appearances for Nottinghamshire in that season, against Surrey at The Oval, Yorkshire at Bramall Lane, and Gloucestershire at Clifton College Close Ground. In his four first-class matches, Seaton scored 80 runs at an average of 11.42, with a high score of 27. He also took a single wicket with the ball.

He died at Oldham, Lancashire on 14 October 1918.
