= Alexander Seton (priest) =

Alexander Seton was Archdeacon of Aghadoe from 25 August 1790 until his death in 1797.
