= John Seton (musician) =

Scottish drummer

- Born: Dunoon, Scotland
- Died: New Zealand
- Genres: Pipe band
- Occupation(s): Senior Drum Major SPBA, Drum Major City of Glasgow Police Pipe Band, Co-Principal of Drumming SPBA College, WWI soldier, drum book author
- Instrument: Snare Drum
- Years active: ~1904-1954

John Seton DCM, BEM, was a Scottish drummer and drum major, and one of the first to publish notated drum scores in the pipe band idiom. He was Joint Principal of Drumming and Senior Drum Major for the Scottish Pipe Band Association, now known as the Royal Scottish Pipe Band Association or RSPBA, and the original holder of these titles at the organization's formation.

Seton's career as a drummer began in about 1904 with the Govan Police Pipe Band, which was later renamed The City of Glasgow Police Pipe Band. From 1910-1927 he was the band’s Leading Drummer.

He served in World War I with the Argyll and Sutherland Highlanders. After the war he published his first book, Bagpipe and Drum Tutor with Pipe-Major Willie Gray in 1922. This was one of the first known publications to use musical notation to describe a pipe band style drum setting.

In 1936 Seton was asked to form the drum department of a new pipe band college, along with Alex A.D. Hamilton. This effort was delayed by World War II but eventually did become the Scottish Pipe Band Association College in 1947, for which Seton was the Senior Drum Major and he and Hamilton served as co-Principals of Drumming.

Seton moved to New Zealand in the 1950s, but continued to play the drum. He published his second instructional book, 50 Years Behind the Drum in 1954. Seton died in New Zealand.

His students included: Drum Major James (Jimmy) Catherwood of the Dalzell Highland Pipe Band and Edinburgh City Police Pipe Band, Drumming Principal Alex McCormick of the Australian Pipe Band College, and his son Drum Major Jack Seton of the Glasgow City Police Pipe Band.
