= Seton Hall (disambiguation) =

Seton Hall University is a four-year University with its main campus and schools located in South Orange, New Jersey.

Seton Hall may also refer to:

- Seton Hall Preparatory School, a private High School with its main campus in West Orange, New Jersey
- Elizabeth Ann Seton (a.k.a. Mother Seton, 1774–1821), founder of a Catholic girls school in Emmitsburg, Maryland and the Sisters of Charity Roman Catholic order
