= John Thomas Seton =

Scottish painter (c. 1738–1806)

John Thomas Seton (c. 1738–1806), also spelled Thomas Seaton, was a Scottish painter.

== Life ==
Seton was the son of Christopher Seton, a gem engraver of London. He was a pupil of Francis Hayman, and studied at the St Martin's Lane Academy. He went on the Grand Tour to Italy, where he was in Rome in 1758/9 where he lived on the Strada della Croce and was involved in the expatriate artist community. He assisted in winding up the affairs of the young painter Jonathan Skelton who died while there.

He was a more rounded artist on his return to Great Britain, and was exhibiting in 1761 at the Society of Artists and receiving commission for portraits and conversation pieces from a fairly exalted clientele. Within a few years, he had settled in Edinburgh, and his portraits of Scottish high-society are amongst the more memorable of his age.

He spent a decade in India (1776–1785) where he had a good portrait practice, but returned to Scotland where he was last recorded in Edinburgh in 1806.

His work frequently appears at the auctions of both Sotheby's and Christie's.

In April 2008, the British Department for Culture, Media and Sport placed a temporary export bar on ‘a rare likeness of Alexander Dalrymple', by John Thomas Seton. Dalrymple was the first Hydrographer to the Admiralty, who ‘through his pioneering work on nautical charts, is a pivotal figure in the development of the global maritime industry as well as of the British Empire’. An attempt was made to raise funds to purchase the portrait at the recommended price of £137,500 and it was subsequently acquired by the National Museum of Scotland where the portrait is currently on display.

== Gallery ==
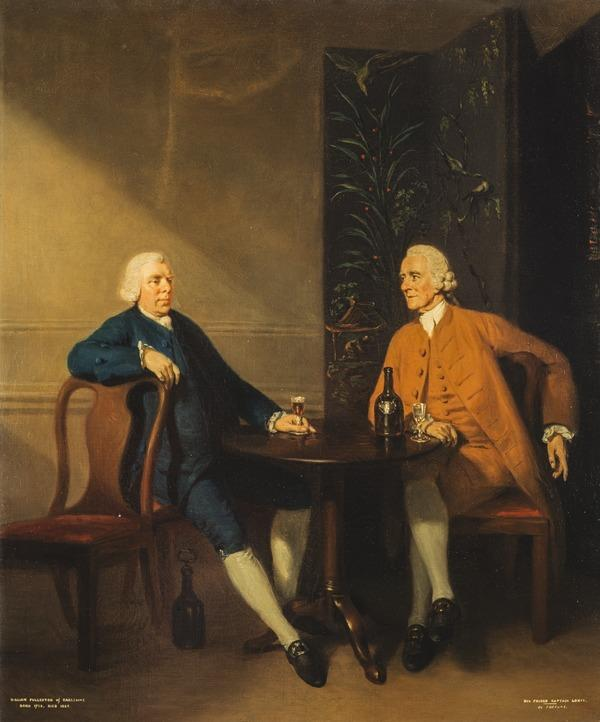
William Fullerton of Carstairs and Captain Ninian Lowis), 1773

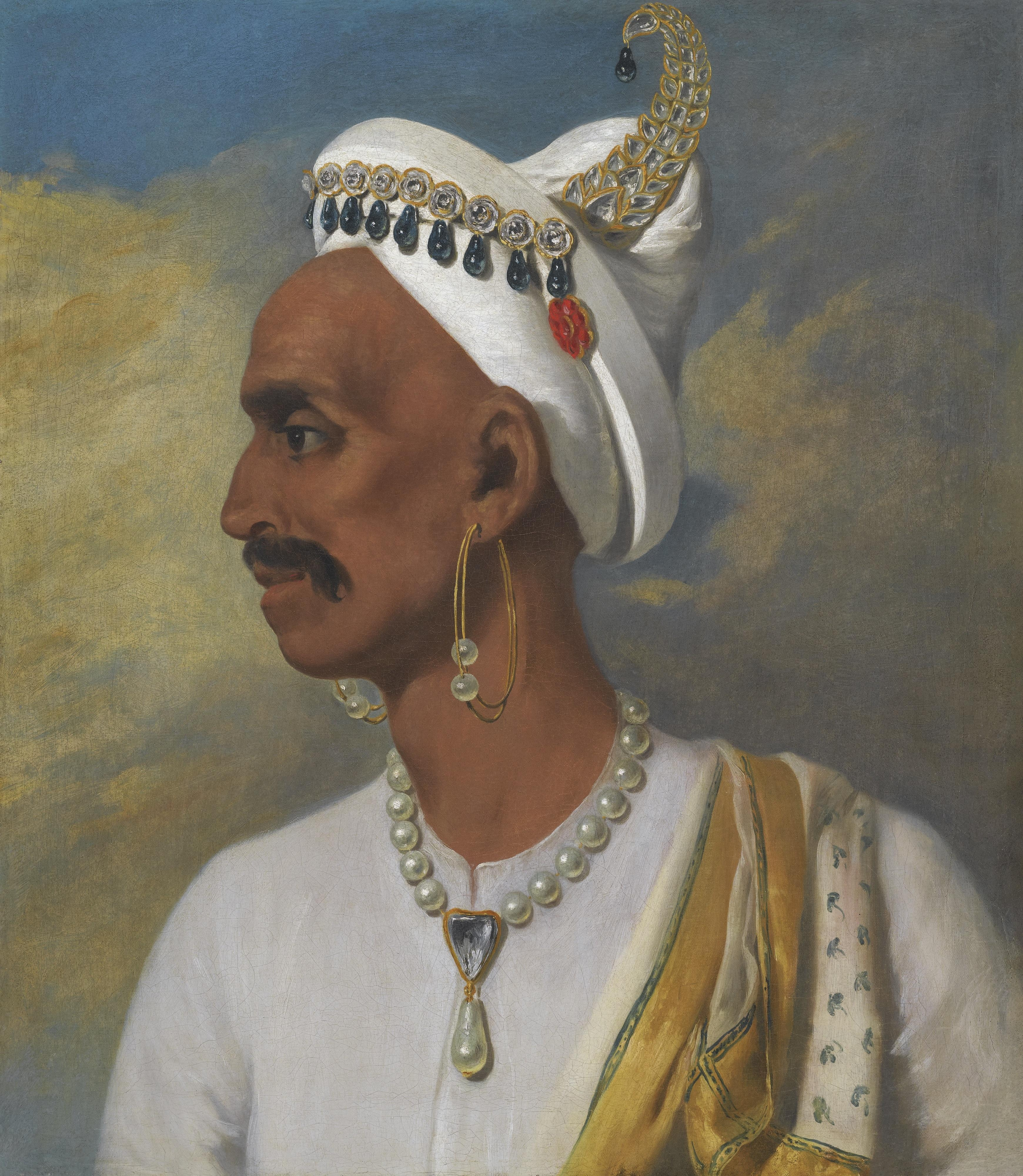
Portrait of Nana Fadnavis, 1778

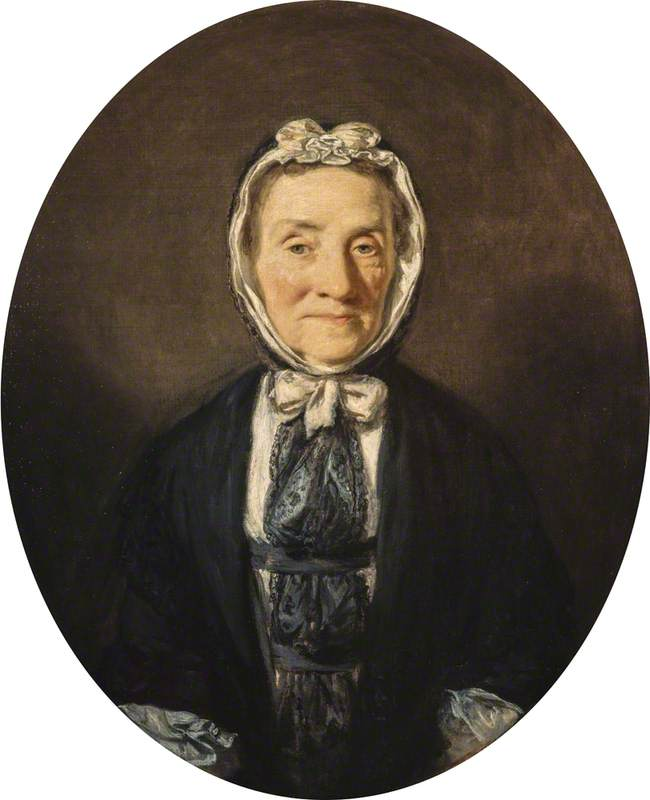
Katherine Paterson, 1776

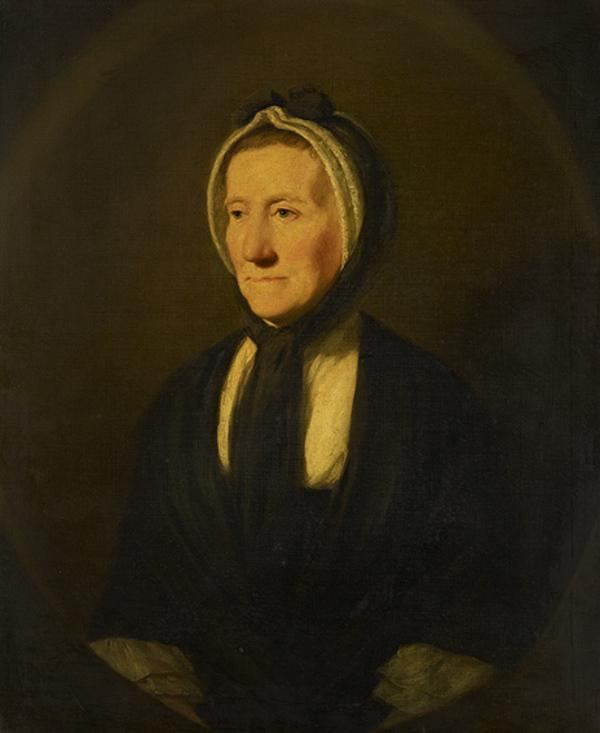
Mrs Smith, 1776

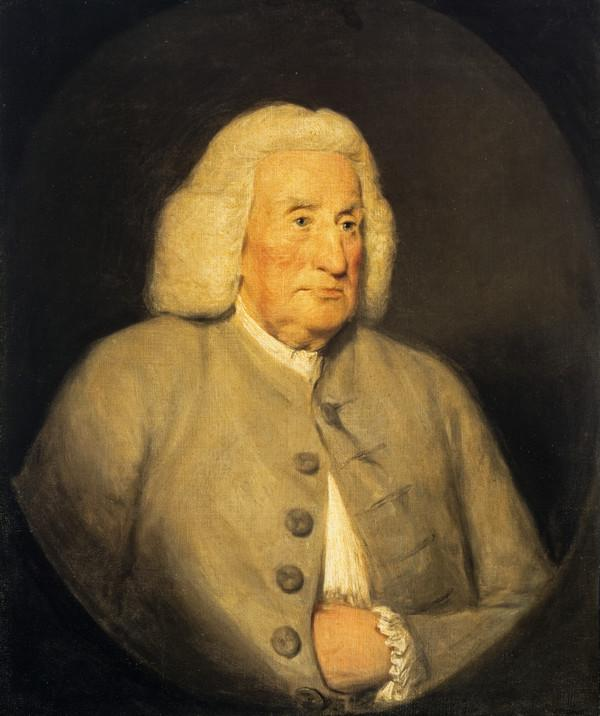
Sir Hugh Paterson, 1776
