= Catherine Seton =

American Roman Catholic religious sister

Catherine Josephine Seton RSM
- Born: June 28, 1800; Manhattan, New York City, U.S.
- Died: April 3, 1891 (aged 90)

Catherine Josephine Seton, RSM (28 June 1800 – 3 April 1891) was the daughter of Elizabeth Ann Seton, founder of the American branch of the Sisters of Charity. Catherine was the first American to join the Irish Sisters of Mercy.

== Biography ==
=== Early life ===
Catherine Josephine Seton was born in 1800, on Staten Island, New York, the fourth of five children of William Magee and Elizabeth Ann Bayley Seton. Both her maternal grandmother and an aunt who had died young were named Catherine. Her father was a partner in the import firm Seton, Maitland, and Company.

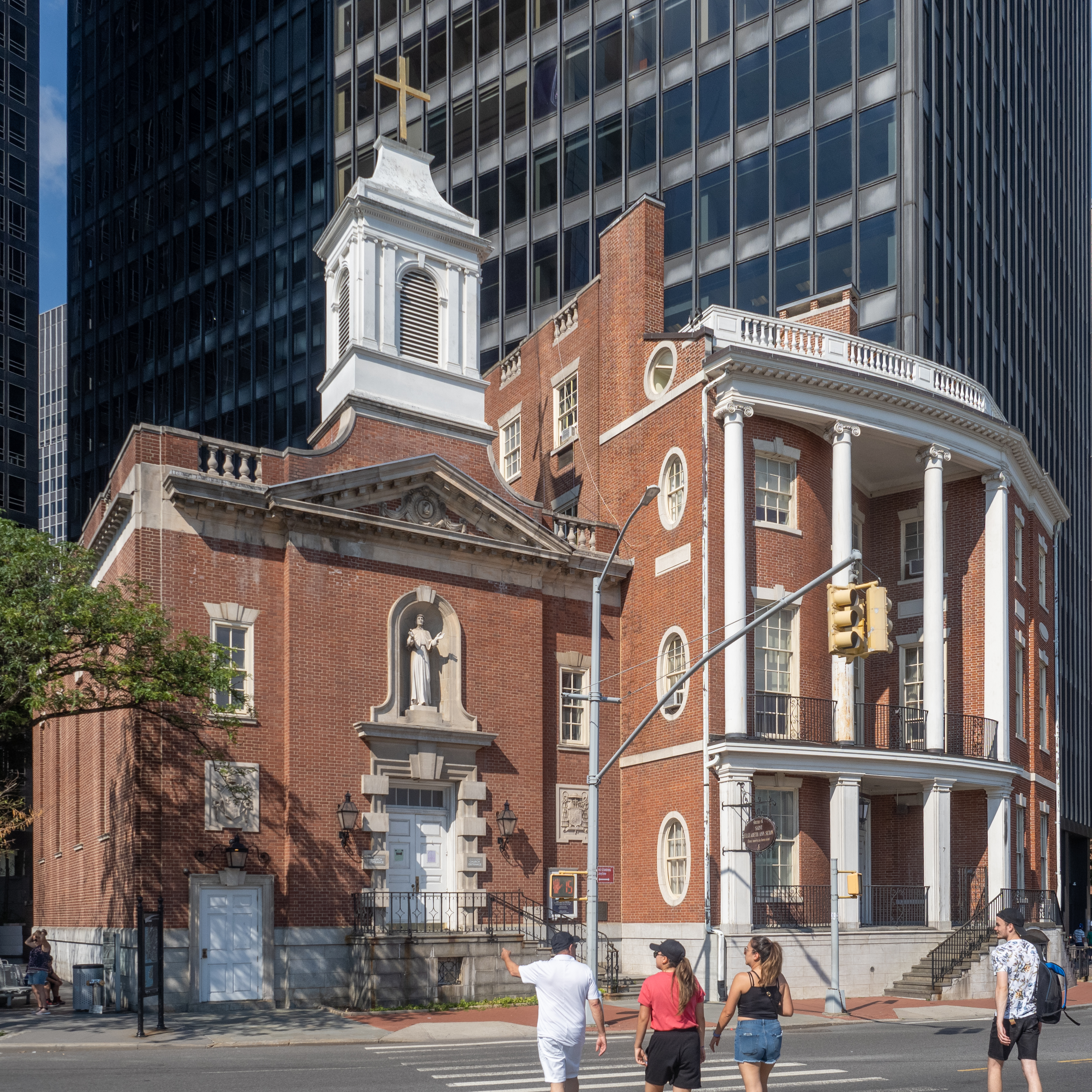
Church of Our Lady of the Most Holy Rosary (left)

The Seton family fortunes waned during the volatile economic climate preceding the War of 1812. The United Kingdom's blockade of France, and the loss of several of his ships at sea, forced William Seton into bankruptcy. The Setons lost their home at 61 Stone Street in lower Manhattan. Elizabeth and the children stayed with her father, Richard Bayley, who was the health officer for the Port of New York. In August 1801, Dr. Bayley contracted yellow fever while inspecting a ship that had just arrived. In her anxiety for his salvation Elizabeth offered to God the life of her infant daughter Catherine. Bayley died on August 17, 1801.

From 1801 to 1803, the family lived in a house at 8 State Street, on the site of the present Church of Our Lady of the Most Holy Rosary.

Catherine's father suffered from tuberculosis. In 1803, on the advice of doctors who thought a warmer climate might ease his condition, he set sail for Italy accompanied by Elizabeth and their eldest daughter Anna Maria. Presumably the rest of the children stayed with relatives, who raised her in the Episcopal Church. William Seton died in Leghorn in December. Upon her return to New York, the widow Seton converted to Catholicism, which she had encountered in Italy. Her children were likewise converted. This was not well-received by members of her social circle, and efforts to support her family by conducting a small school for young ladies were unsuccessful. At the invitation of Sulpician Louis William Valentine Dubourg, in 1809, Elizabeth and her children moved to Emmitsburg, Maryland, where she opened Saint Joseph's Academy and Free School for girls.

Catherine grew up in Emmitsburg, Maryland, where she attended her mother's school, and where she eventually taught piano and voice. She formed long-lasting friendships with people both at St. Joseph's and the nearby Mount St. Mary's College. President of the college, Rev. John Dubois became a father figure to her. Her two sisters, Anna Maria (1795-1812) and Rebecca Mary (1802-1816) died young. Although Catherine spent most of her time in Emmitsburg, her mother sent her on occasional trips to Baltimore, Annapolis, and Philadelphia for her health and social enrichment. In Baltimore, she made the acquaintance of Catherine Harper, daughter of Charles Carroll, one of the wealthiest men in America.

After her mother Elizabeth Seton died, Catherine was adopted by her "second mother" Julie Scott from 1821 until 1842. During this period, she had three tours of Europe.

On her first trip abroad, Rev. Dubois, now bishop of New York and on a fund-raising trip, took her on a tour of Rome. On her second trip, in company with Catherine Harper, she met Cornelia Connelly, who later founded the Society of the Holy Child Jesus. She traveled again in 1838 with her brother William and his family. When Catherine Seton returned to New York in 1840, Catherine engaged in various charitable works suggested by Bishop Dubois.

Dubois died in 1842. Catherine asked his successor, Bishop John Hughes to recommend a religious community. Hughes had recently arranged for the Sisters of Mercy of Dublin to establish a presence in the diocese, and he suggested Catherine wait for their arrival. The sisters disembarked from the Montezuma out of Liverpool, arriving on 14 May 1846. Under the direction of Mother Agnes O’Connor, the sisters established a convent at West Washington Place. Catherine entered the community as a choir postulant the following October at the age of forty-six. She received the habit on 6 April 1847, and was given the name "Sister Mary Catherine".

They began their work by visiting patients at Bellevue and Harlem hospitals, as well as inmates at the Tombs, Sing Sing, and Blackwell's Island penitentiary. Sister Mary Catherine visited thousands who were locked away in New York City. From her time abroad, she know French and Italian, and learned to speak German, and Spanish to communicate with each prisoner. In the latter portion of her service, she was respectfully referred to as "Mother Mary Catherine".

She was affectionately called "the Angel of the Tombs" briefly during the Civil War while she acted as a far-stationed nurse for injured Union forces.

Catherine Seton died of pneumonia at the age of ninety at St. Catherine's Convent on 81st Street. Her Requiem Mass was said by her nephew, Monsignor Robert Seton. She is buried in the Mercy plot at Calvary Cemetery (Queens).

== Sainthood cause ==
As of 2019, members of Catherine Seton's order, the Sisters of Mercy, were documenting her life for a possible candidacy for sainthood.
