= Helen Leslie, Lady Newbattle =

Scottish aristocrat

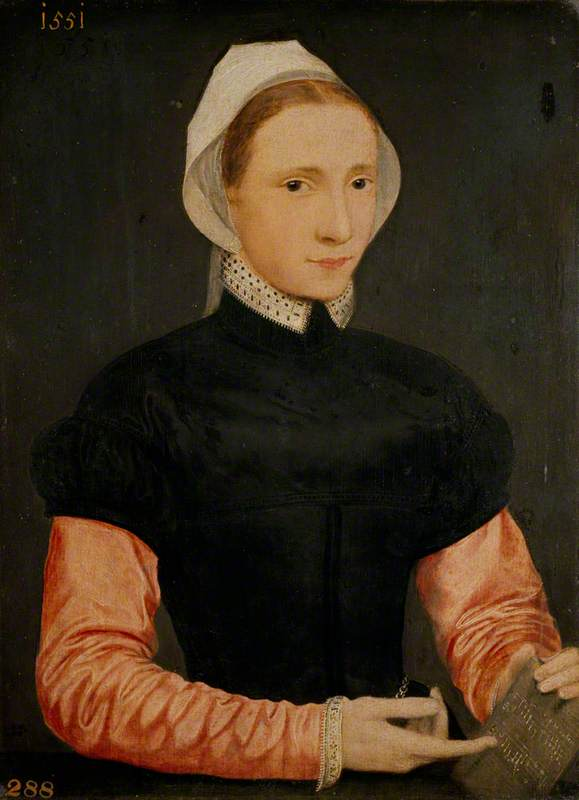
Helen Leslie, by Willem Key, Scottish National Portrait Gallery.

Helen Leslie, Lady Newbattle (1520-1594) was a Scottish aristocrat and supporter of Mary, Queen of Scots.

She was a daughter of George Leslie, 4th Earl of Rothes and Margaret Crichton. The surname is sometimes spelled "Lesley".

She first married Gilbert Seton of Parbroath, and secondly, Mark Ker of Newbattle. In early modern Scotland married women did not change their surnames.

During the "Lang Siege" of Edinburgh Castle, in January 1572 she loaned money to William Kirkcaldy of Grange to pay the wages of soldiers fighting for the cause of Mary, Queen of Scots. She took a packet of gold buttons from the jewels of Mary, Queen of Scots as a pledge from James Mosman. After the castle fell in June 1573, she brought the queen's buttons to the English commander William Drury at his lodging in Leith. He took the buttons and paid her back.

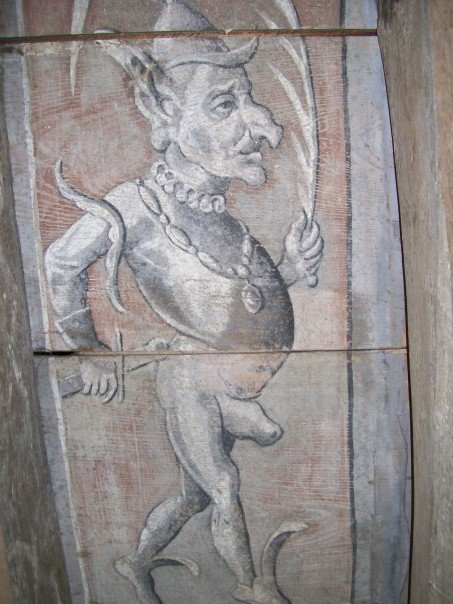
Figure from the Prestongrange painted ceiling dated 1581

From 1577 Helen Leslie and her husband rented a house on the High Street of Edinburgh from James Marjoribanks. She was involved in the management of her husband's estates, and went to law to try to terminate the lease of the coal mines at Prestongrange held by the Laird of Cockpen.

Esmé Stewart, the favourite of James VI, gave Helen Leslie and her husband Mark Kerr a "buffet" or cupboard for their hall at Prestongrange House. The ceiling of the hall was painted in 1581 with vivid emblems, ornament copied from the prints of Cornelis Bos, and comic figures copied from a French illustrated book Richard Breton's Songes drôlatiques de Pantagruel. The ceiling was removed and installed in Merchiston Tower for Napier Technical College in 1964.

Helen Leslie kept up a correspondence with John Lesley, Bishop of Ross, who had been secretary to Mary, Queen of Scots. In June 1590 he replied to her from Rouen, hoping her son George Leslie could forward the relief of his debts and his credit and rehabilitation in Scotland.

She died on 26 October 1594. She made her will at Prestongrange in September 1594 in the presence of "hir gude friend" Alexander Seton, Lord Urquhart.

== Marriages and children ==
Her first husband was Gilbert Seton of Parbroath. Their children included:

- David Seton of Parbroath (died 1601)
- Janet Seton, who married the Laird of Samuelston.

She married secondly, Mark Kerr (died 1584), Commendator of Newbattle.

Their children included:

- Mark Kerr, 1st Earl of Lothian (died 1594)
- Andrew Kerr of Fenton
- George Kerr, who was involved in the "Spanish blanks" controversy.
- William Kerr
- Catherine Kerr, who married William Maxwell, Lord Herries.

== Ancestry ==
Ancestors of Helen Leslie, Lady Newbattle

16. George Leslie, 1st Earl of Rothes
8. Andrew Leslie, Master of Rothes
17. Christina Halyburton
4. William Leslie, 3rd Earl of Rothes
18. William Sinclair, 1st Earl of Caithness
9. Marjory Sinclair
19. Marjory Sutherland
2. George Leslie, 4th Earl of Rothes
20. Sir John Balfour, Sheriff of Fife
10. Michael Balfour of Strathore
21. ...
5. Margaret Balfour
22. Sir Andrew Ogilvy of Inchmartin
11. Janet Ogilvy
23. Margaret Glen
1. Helen Leslie
24. William Crichton, 1st Lord Crichton
12. James Crichton, 2nd Lord Crichton
25. Agnes (Maitland?)
6. William Crichton, 3rd Lord Crichton
26. James Dunbar, 4th Earl of Moray
13. Janet Dunbar
27. Janet Seton
3. Margaret Crichton
28. James I of Scotland
14. James II of Scotland
29. Joan Beaufort
7. Margaret Stewart
30. Arnold, Duke of Guelders
15. Mary of Guelders
31. Catherine of Cleves
