= Prestongrange =

Coordinates: 55.952°N 2.996°W

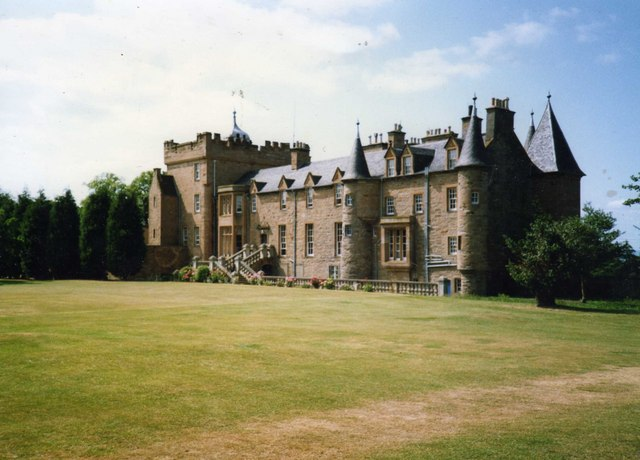
- Prestongrange House

- Location within Scotland
- OS grid reference: NT378736
- Civil parish: Prestonpans
- Council area: East Lothian Council
- Lieutenancy area: East Lothian
- Country: Scotland
- Sovereign state: United Kingdom
- Post town: PRESTONPANS
- Postcode district: EH32
- Dialling code: 01875
- Police: Scotland
- Fire: Scottish
- Ambulance: Scottish
- UK Parliament: East Lothian
- Scottish Parliament: East Lothian

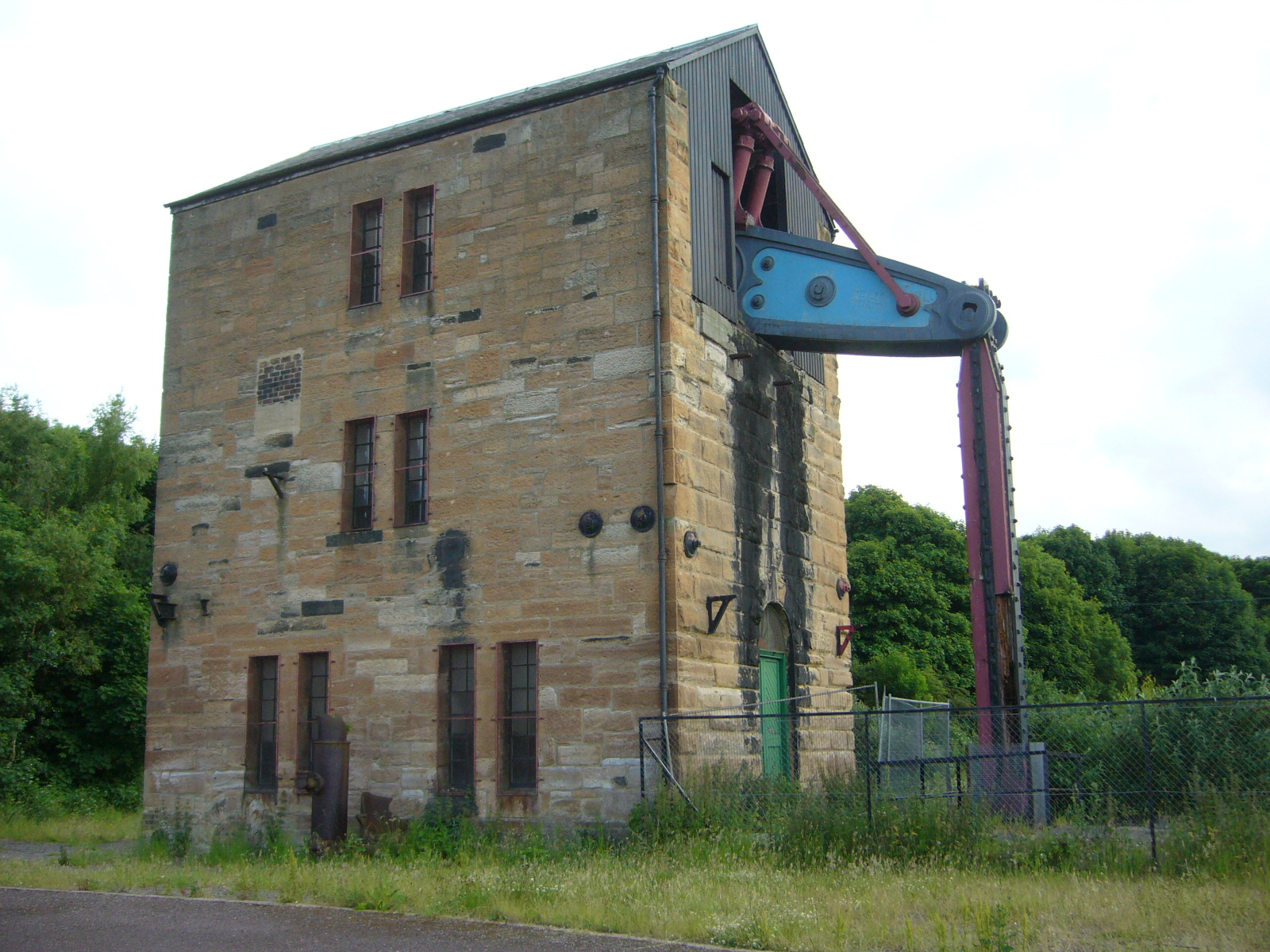
Colliery engine

Prestongrange is a place in East Lothian, Scotland, United Kingdom, situated between Musselburgh to the west, and Prestonpans to the east.

The place name derives from "Preston", meaning "priest's town", and a grange (or granary) which was worked by the Cistercian monks of Newbattle Abbey.

In the early 17th century, Mark Ker took possession of the lands from the abbey, and after the Grant Suttie family took over, the Prestongrange Colliery was no longer productive and fell into disuse.

In 1830, Sir George Grant Suttie leased Prestongrange Colliery to Matthias Dunn, the Inspector of Mines.

== Prestongrange House ==
This fine mansion-house was partly rebuilt by Mark Kerr and Helen Leslie. It passed through marriage to John Morison of Saughton Hall around 1600. Later owners included Alexander Morison, Lord Prestongrange who extended it in 1620. In the early 19th century it was greatly extended by the architect William Henry Playfair.

== See also ==
- Prestongrange Industrial Heritage Museum
- Prestongrange House, now the headquarters of the Royal Musselburgh Golf Club
- Prestongrange Parish Church
- William Grant, Lord Prestongrange
- List of places in East Lothian
