= Levenhall Links =

Coastal, industrial, and recreational area at East Lothian, Scotland

Coordinates: 55.947°N 3.028°W

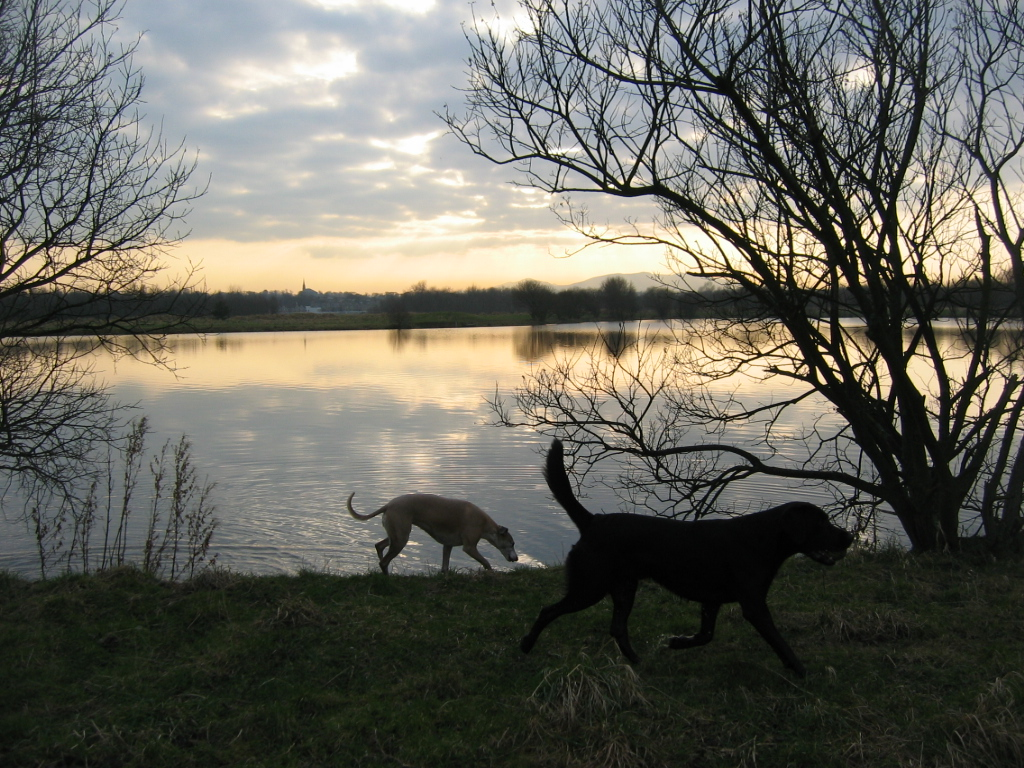
Levenhall boating lake

Levenhall Links is a coastal, industrial, and recreational area at Musselburgh, East Lothian, Scotland, UK; it is adjacent to Musselburgh Racecourse, Morrison's Haven and Prestongrange Industrial Heritage Museum. Its western boundary is the River Esk and its eastern is at Morrison's Haven.

Levenhall Links is 134 hectares of land reclaimed from the sea by building a sea wall and pumping large amounts of pulverised fuel ash into a number of ash lagoons. This infill site for fly ash from the coal fired Cockenzie Power Station has been partially restored and landscaped, shallow pools for wading birds have been created, and the area has become a popular site for birdwatchers, as well as an informal golf practice area. The Royal Musselburgh Golf Club originated at Levenhall Links before moving to Prestongrange House.

== Conservation ==
Two areas of Levenhall Links have been designated as part of the Firth of Forth Special Protection Area and are an important roosting site for wading birds at high tide, and the only major roost between Cramond and Aberlady. The boating lake attracts up to 200 wigeon who graze on the bank during the winter.

The wader scrape has also been designated as part of a Site of Special Scientific Interest (SSSI).

The site is part of the John Muir Way long-distance path along the entire East Lothian coast; Levenhall Links is part of the section between Fisherrow harbour and Cockenzie harbour.

== Wildlife ==
Levenhall Links are one of the most popular sites for birdwatching in the vicinity of Edinburgh. The ash lagoons have provided a roost site for gulls, shorebirds, and terns; while the seawall provides excellent views of the flocks of sea ducks such as common eider, velvet scoter, red-breasted merganser, long-tailed duck, and common goldeneye. Many rare visitors have been seen over the years including white-winged scoter, surf scoter, Wilson's phalarope, western sandpiper, broad-billed sandpiper, Terek sandpiper, long-billed dowitcher, lesser yellowlegs, marsh sandpiper, Bonaparte's gull, Franklin's gull, Brünnich's guillemot and citrine wagtail. It has hosted three terns that had their first occurrences for Scotland here; namely Forster's tern, lesser crested tern, and royal tern. It is also one of the most regular sites in Scotland for the Mediterranean gull.

Other wildlife seen are red fox, roe deer, brown hare, weasel, common toad, common seal, and grey seal. Otters have been recorded on the adjacent River Esk.

== 2018 and beyond ==
In November 2018, East Lothian Council granted planning permission for Scottish Power to improve the wildlife and amenity value of Levenhall Links. The plans are that Lagoon 8, the one closest to the River Esk, will be landscaped to create a large wetland area with islands to be used as roosting areas for waders, gulls, and terns, this will be protected by a moat and overlooked by paths and accessible bird hides. Lagoon 6, at the eastern end of the site, will be differently modified by infilling to create a natural habitat for birds and insects. There are also plans to regrade the surface at Lagoon 7, between Lagoon 8 and the boating pond, to make gentler slopes. The site is subject to a Pollution Prevention and Control Permit (PPC), which SEPA bears responsibility for. The ownership of the remainder of the Links will only be transferred to East Lothian Council once the planned works are complete and SEPA is satisfied that all required measures to prevent and control any pollution have been put in place.

== Photo gallery ==
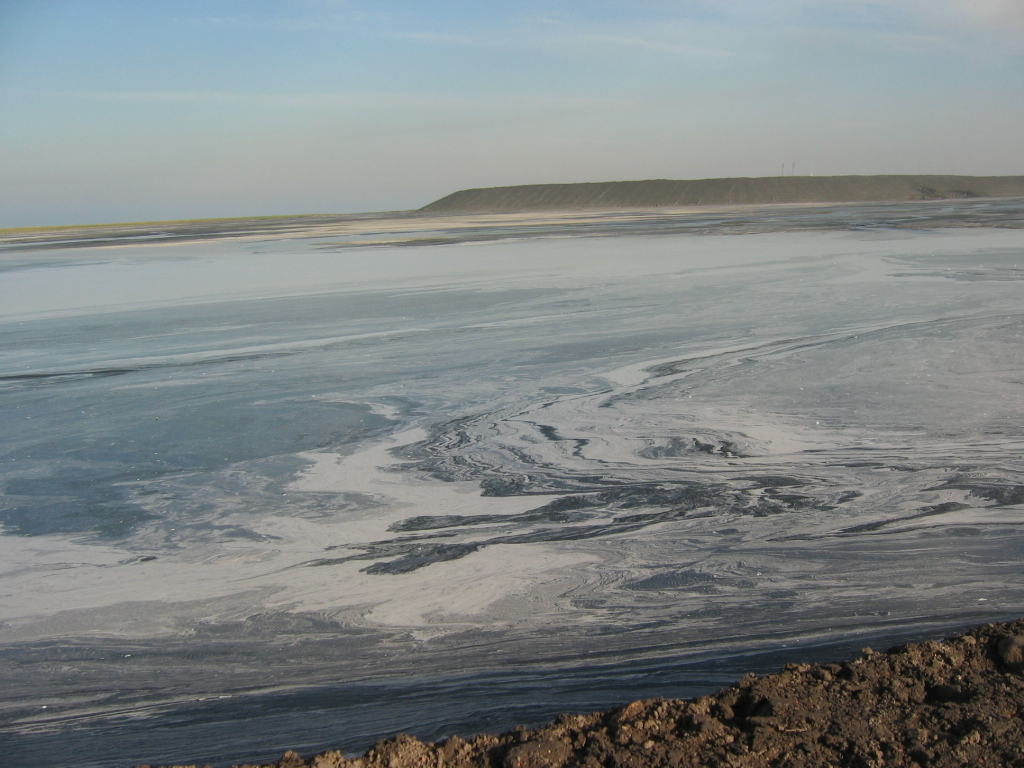
Ash lagoon

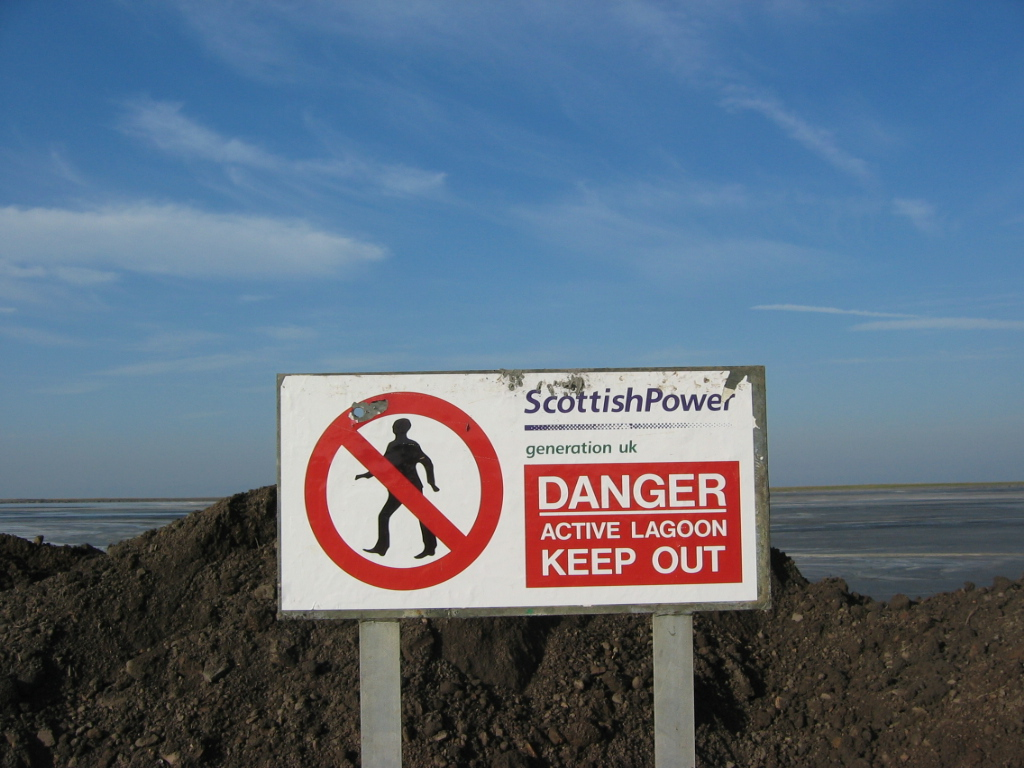
Scottish Power warning notice

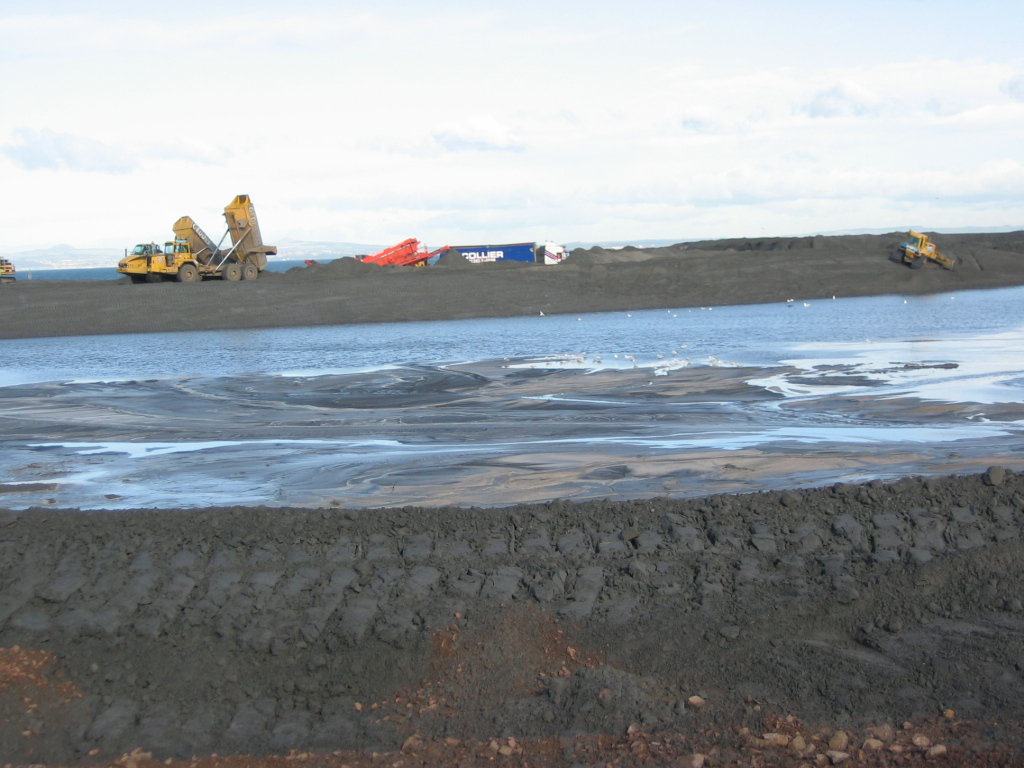
Moving the fly ash

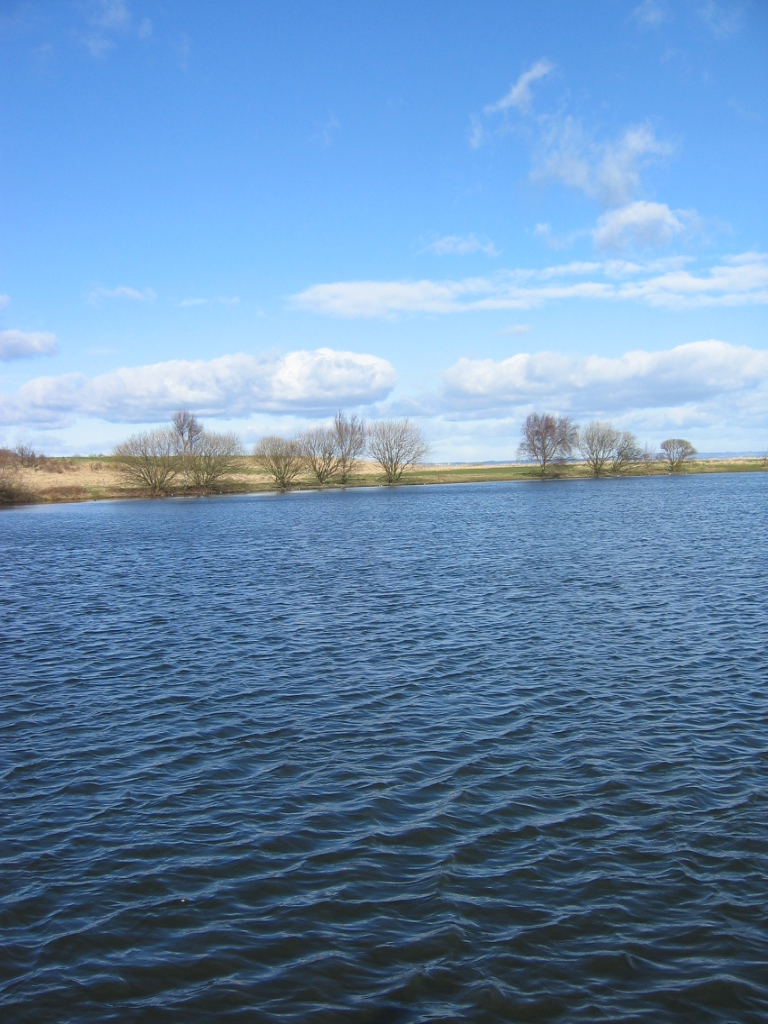
Boating lake

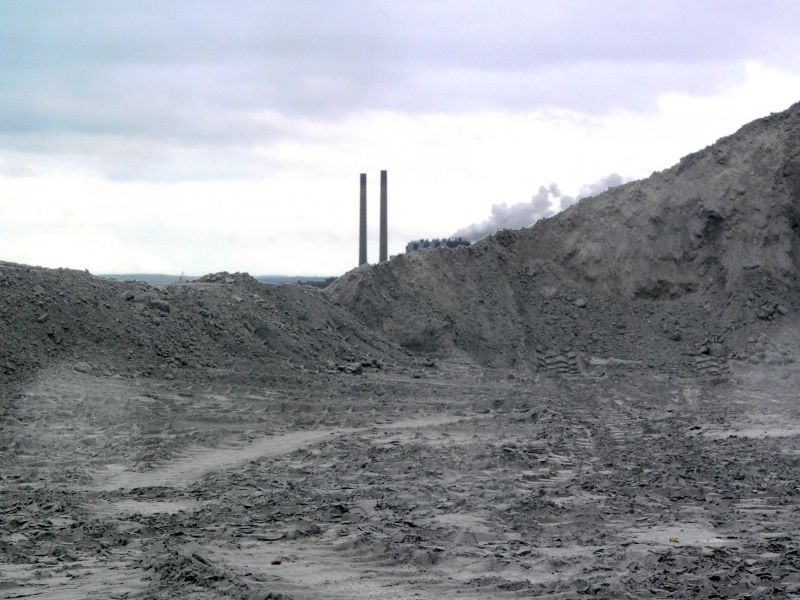
Ash lagoon and power station

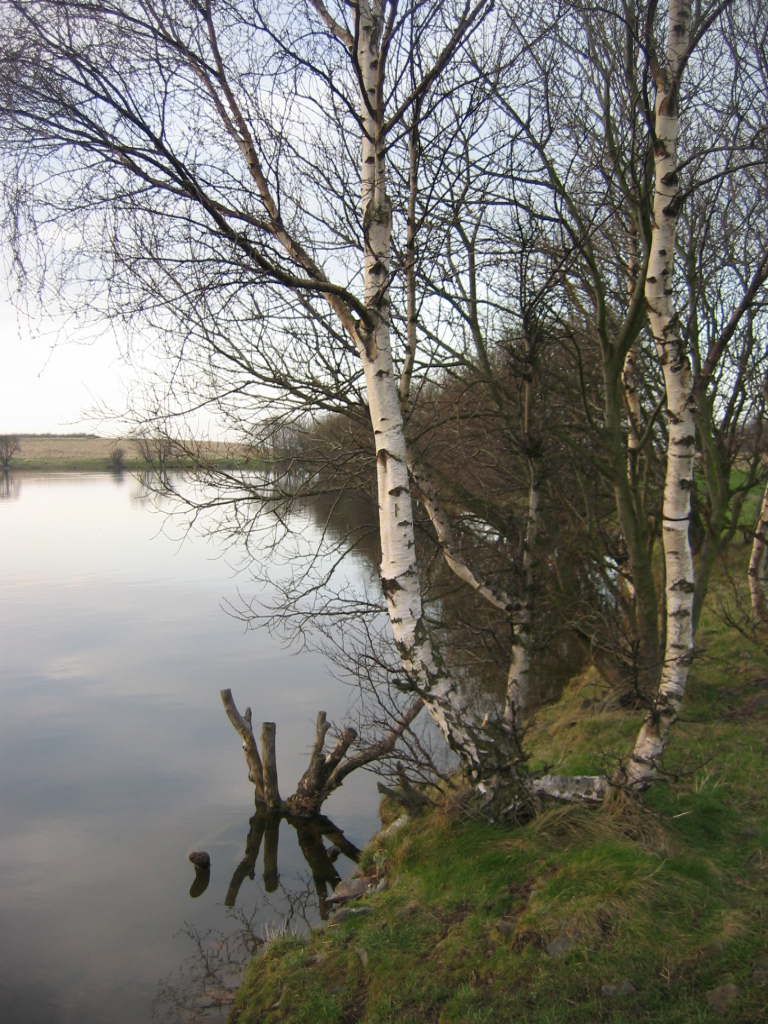
Birches at Levenhall boating lake

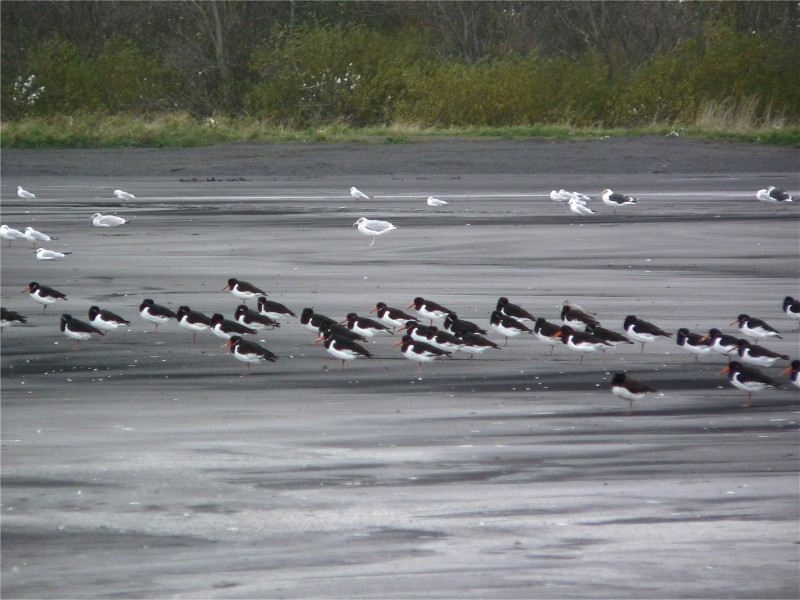
Wading birds on the ash lagoon

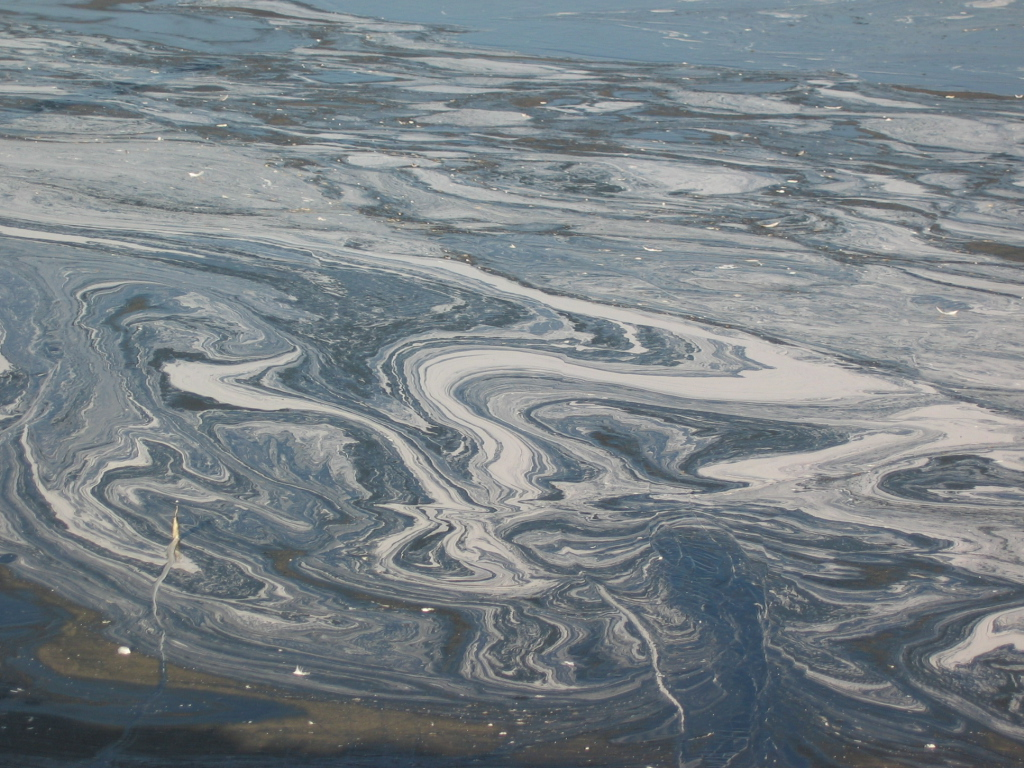
Ash lagoon
