= George Leslie, 4th Earl of Rothes =

Scottish nobleman (1484 –1558)

George Leslie, 4th Earl of Rothes (2 Aug 1484 – 24 November 1558) was a Scottish nobleman and diplomat.

George was the eldest son and heir of William Leslie, 3rd Earl of Rothes and Lord Leslie, who fell at the Battle of Flodden in 1513. George succeeded his father William, who in turn had succeeded his brother, George Leslie, the 2nd Earl.

One of his first actions was the redemption, by purchase, of part of the estate lands of the Barony of Ballinbreich (Fife), which James IV of Scotland had sold to Andrew Barton. On 1 April 1517 he had a charter to himself and to Margaret Crichton, then his fiancé. It appears, from the Charter, that the payment was made for a remaining part of the lands not held by Leslie, by Margaret. The lands were then joined into barony and Leslie was granted the lands and barony of Ballinbreich in Fife, with lands to Margaret in liferent, and all other lands belonging to the late George, Earl of Rothes, and the Crown renounced all rights and casualties from the lands.

He was Sheriff of Fife from 1529 to 1540 and a Lord of Session from 1541 and a Lord of the Articles from 1544.

George accompanied James V of Scotland on his wedding trip to France in 1536. He was tried for the murder of Cardinal Beaton and acquitted in 1546. He was ambassador to Denmark in 1550, and died at Dieppe, France in 1558.

George died while returning from the solemnization of the marriage of Mary, Queen of Scots, which he witnessed. Several of the other Scottish commissioners died, Lord Fleming at Paris, and the Bishop of Orkney and Earl of Cassillis at Dieppe on the same night as George, 24 November 1558. It was rumoured that they were murdered because of their stance on the issue of giving the Crown-Matrimonial of Scotland to the Dauphin.

== Family ==
His first marriage was to Margaret Crichton, the illegitimate daughter of William, third Lord Crichton, by the Princess Margaret Stewart. They appear, as husband and wife, in August 1517, when she is titled as Countess of Rothes. This marriage was dissolved by decree of divorce on 27 November 1520. Margaret, however, already had a liferent on lands of the Earldom (those at Ballinbreich mentioned prior) and thus appears on every major Charter of the Earldom up to October 1542. This has, in turn, led to confusion and speculation of a re-marriage between the couple (as Margaret, being born between 1478 and 1485, would be somewhere between 57 and 64 if they had reconciled and had more children).

George and Margaret had five children:

- Norman Leslie, Master of Rothes, who was involved in the murder of Cardinal Beaton and the siege of St Andrews Castle. Norman pre-deceased his father, so the next Earl was Andrew Leslie, a son of George's third marriage to Agnes, daughter of John Somerville of Cambusnethan, Lanarkshire.
- William Leslie of Cairnie, forfeited for his part in Cardinal Beaton's murder
- Helen Leslie, who married (1) Gilbert Seton of Parbroath, (2) Mark Kerr, Commendator of Newbattle.
- Janet Leslie
- Robert Leslie of Ardersier

George divorced Margaret Crichton on 27 November 1520, and married, on 5 June 1525, Elizabeth, daughter of Andrew, 3rd Lord Gray. She was the widow of John Lyon, 4th Lord Glamis. They had no children, and she died before 1530. George married thirdly, Agnes, a daughter of John Somerville of Cambusnethan, the widow of John Fleming, 2nd Lord Fleming, with issue. He then married Isobel Lundy, widow of the 7th Earl of Crawford, with no issue.

Children of George and Agnes Somerville;

- Andrew, the heir.
- James Leslie
- Margaret Leslie, who married John Cunningham of Glengarnock.
- Beatrix Leslie, who married David Beaton of Creich.
- Elizabeth (or Isabel) Leslie, married David Leslie of Inverdovate, Fife.
- Agnes Leslie, (born after 1542), married William Douglas of Lochleven, later Earl of Morton
- Euphemia Leslie, married George Learmonth of Balcomie
- Margaret Leslie, married 25 Dec 1575 Archibald Douglas, 8th Earl of Angus, (divorced 1587).

== Sources ==
- The Complete Peerage by G. E. Cockayne, edited by Geoffrey H. White, FSA., FRHist.S., vol.xi, London, 1949, pp. 190–193 & notes.
- Burke's Peerage Baronetage & Knightage edited by Peter Townend, 105th edition, London, 1970, pp. 1653 and 2305.
- "Leslie, George (d.1558)" . Dictionary of National Biography. London: Smith, Elder & Co. 1885–1900.

Peerage of Scotland
| Preceded by William Leslie | Earl of Rothes; 1513–1558 | Succeeded by Andrew Leslie |
