= Alexander Morison, Lord Prestongrange =

Scottish judge

Alexander Morison (or Morrison), Lord Prestongrange (1579–1631) was a 17th-century Scottish judge, Senator of the College of Justice and Lord President of the Court of Session.

== Life ==
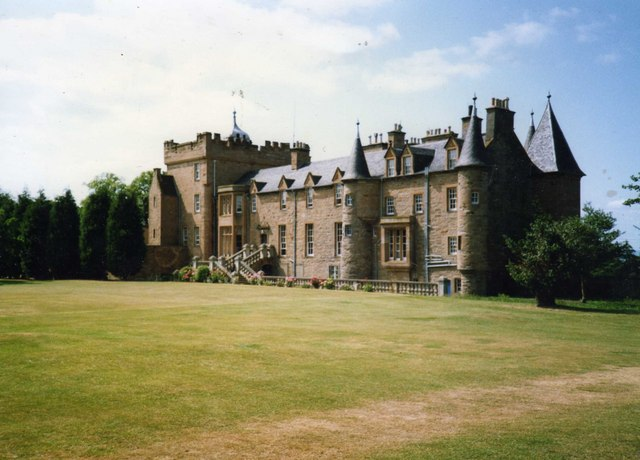
Prestongrange House, East Lothian

He was the son of John Morison of Saughtonhall (1558–1615), a burgess and treasurer of the city of Edinburgh, and his wife, Katherine Preston, daughter of Sir John Preston, Lord President of the Court of Session, and second wife Lilias Gilbert. He was born in 1579 probably in Saughton Hall, just west of Edinburgh.

John Preston (his grandfather) had built Prestongrange House, a fine mansion west of Prestonpans, and this house came to belong to Alexander through inheritance around 1600.

He trained as a lawyer at the University of Edinburgh under Henry Charteris, graduating with an MA in 1598. He passed the Scottish bar as an advocate in 1604.

In February 1626 he was elected a Senator of the College of Justice and took the title Lord Prestongrange. In 1627 he was elected Rector of the University of Edinburgh in place of Andrew Ramsay.

He died at home in Prestongrange in East Lothian on 20 September 1631.

== Family ==
In 1610 he married Eleanor Maule daughter of William Maule of Glaster. They had four daughters and one son, Alexander, who inherited the Preston Grange estate.

Their daughter Bethia married Sir Robert Spottiswoode.

His sister Catherine, married William Scott, Lord Clerkington.

== Trivia ==
Saughton Hall stood in 98 acres (40 ha) of ground and was demolished by Edinburgh Council in 1952 to make way for housing.
