= Royal Musselburgh Golf Club =

Golf club in East Lothian, Scotland

Coordinates: 55.9523°N 2.9963°W

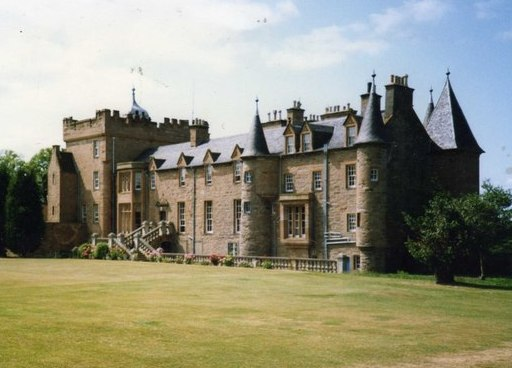
Prestongrange House is the clubhouse of the Royal Musselburgh Golf Club

The Royal Musselburgh Golf Club is a golf club at Prestongrange House, Prestongrange near Prestonpans, East Lothian, Scotland, on the B1361.

Between 1774 and 1926, the club was based at Levenhall Links, Musselburgh.

== History ==
The first golf clubs were founded in the 18th century. The first was the Royal Blackheath Golf Club, instituted in 1608, followed by the Honourable Company of Edinburgh Golfers in 1744, the Royal and Ancient Golf Club of St Andrews in 1754, and the Royal Musselburgh Golf Club in 1774. These clubs gradually accepted some responsibility for the links on which they played.

What is now the Royal Musselburgh Golf Club was established in 1774 as the Musselburgh Golf Club, and the Old Club Cup was played for the first time. It is the oldest golf trophy that has been played for continuously in the world, and it can be seen in the Clubhouse.

In 1811 the first Lady Golfer competition took place, and in 1834 the club issued a new set of rules.

The RMGC is the fifth oldest golf club in the world. It was originally played over the nine-hole course at Levenhall Links, and in 1872 the first clubhouse was built at the Links.

In 1876 the club became the Royal Musselburgh Golf Club. The royal title was granted by Prince Arthur, Duke of Connaught, godson of the Duke of Wellington. He remained as Patron of the club until his death in 1942.

In 1908 RMGC merged with the New Club, one of four golf clubs on the Links.

In 1922 the Club entered a new era through the move to Prestongrange House and Estate, made possible through CISWO, the Coal Industry Social Welfare Organisation. The new clubhouse was a 12th-century historic house, originally owned by the monks of Newbattle Abbey. An 18-hole course was designed by renowned golf course architect James Braid as a traditional parkland course, yet close to the sea. The yardage is 6237.

== The club in the 21st century ==
Royal Musselburgh Golf Club is part of Lothian and Borders Police's "Golf Initiative" which enables school pupils to have free coaching and support.

In the Telegraph newspaper's search for the most characterful golf course in Scotland, RMGC won the accolade of "Most venerable" golf course.

== Photo gallery ==
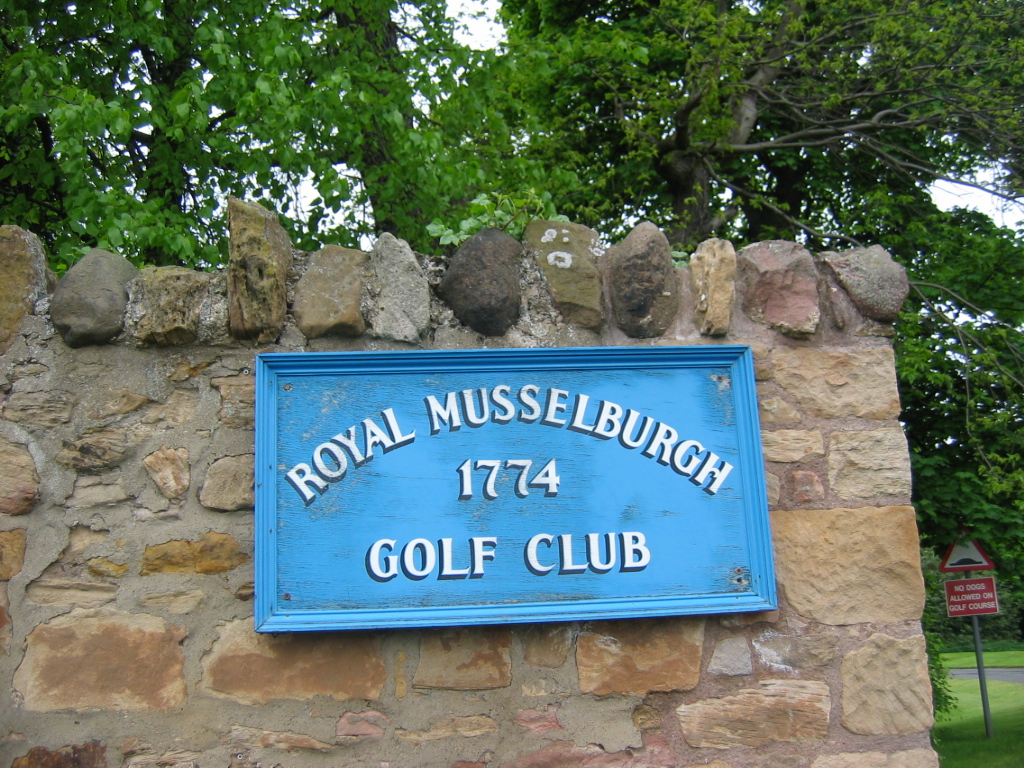
Royal Musselburgh Golf Club

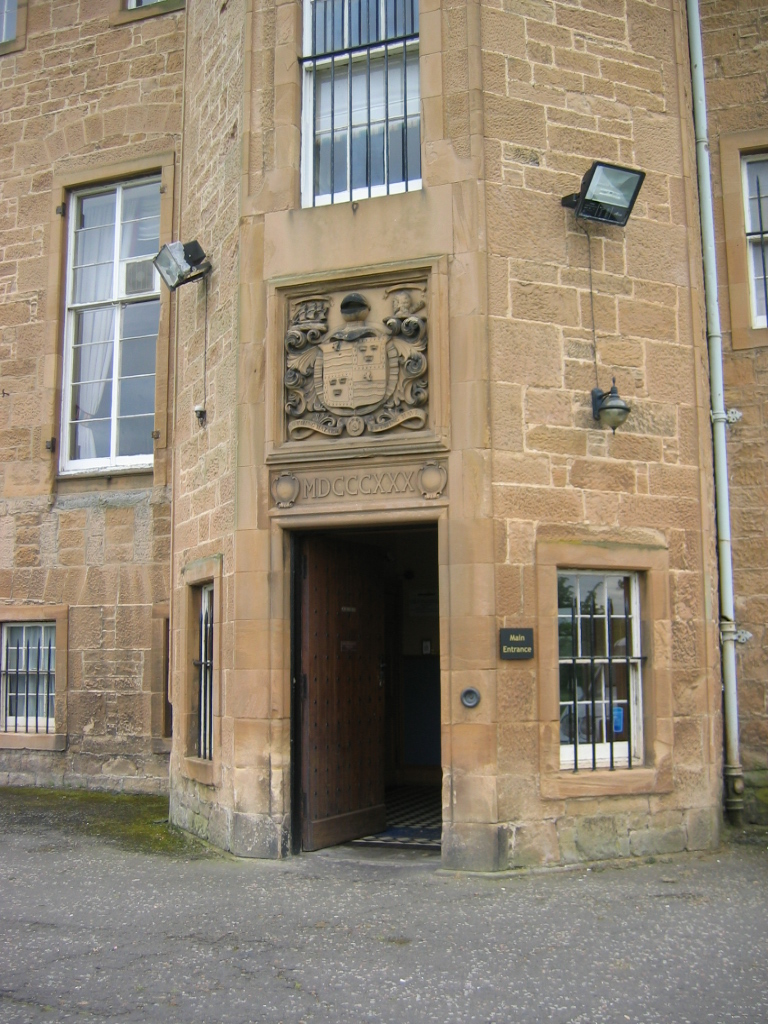
Main entrance of Prestongrange House

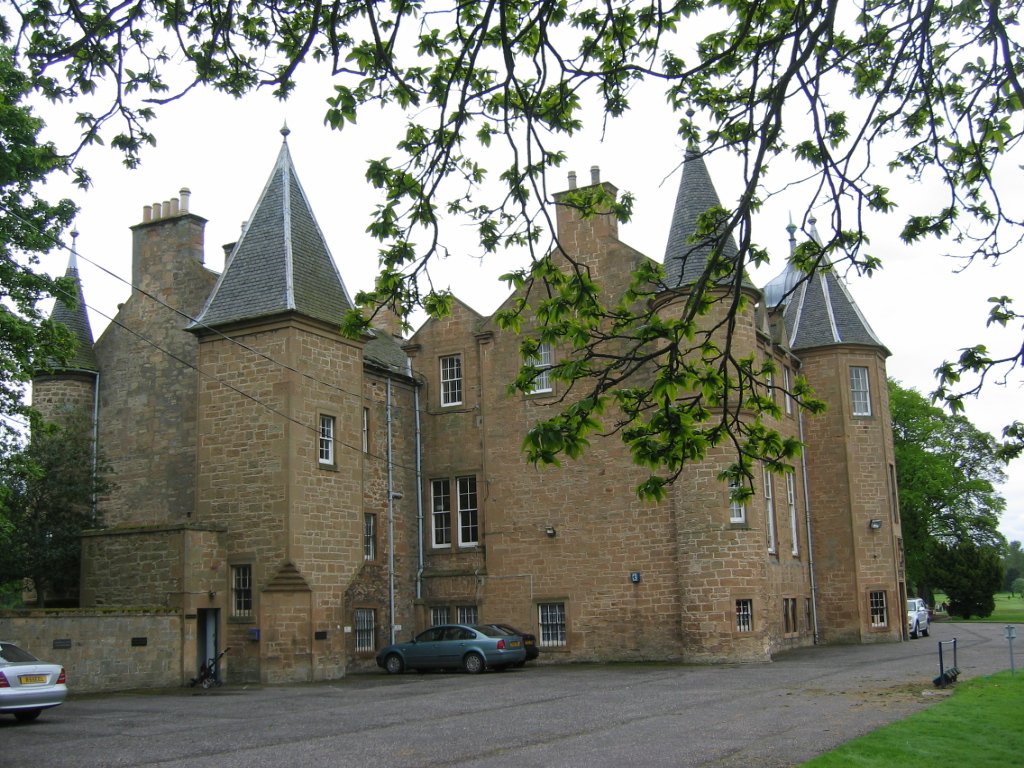
Front of Prestongrange House

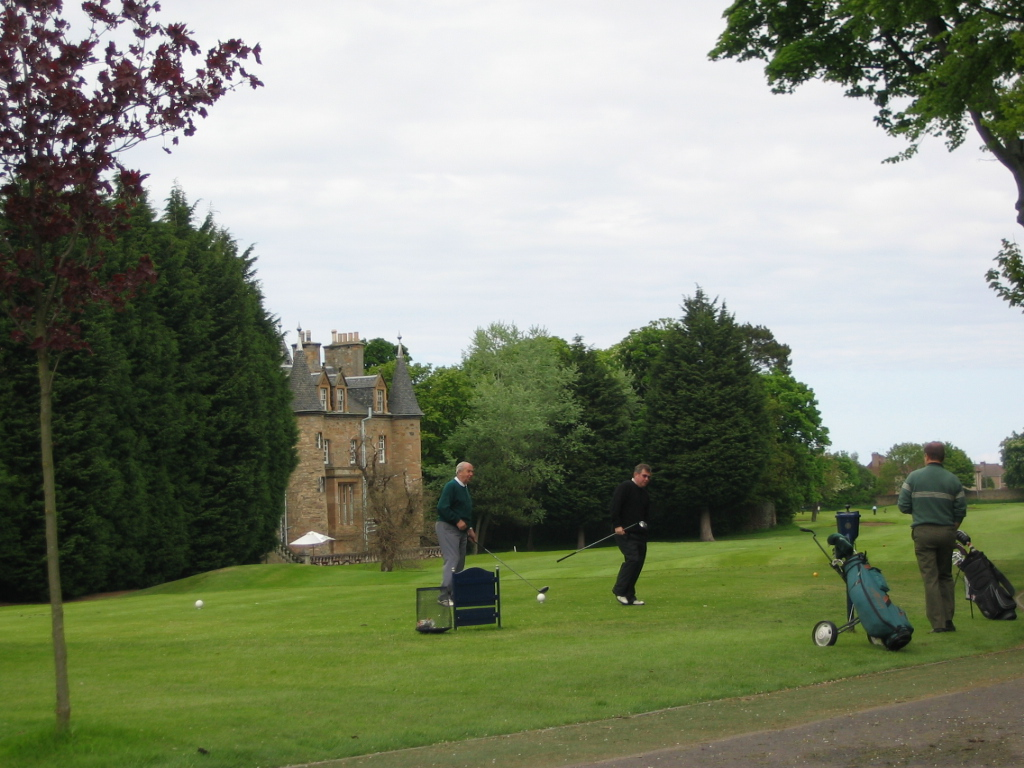
Golfers on the Royal Musselburgh golf course

== See also ==
- List of golf clubs granted Royal status
- List of places in East Lothian
- List of places in West Lothian
- List of places in Midlothian
- List of places in Edinburgh
