= Extraordinary Lord of Session =

Extraordinary Lords of Session were lay members of the Court of Session in Scotland from 1532 to 1762, and were part of the historical judiciary of Scotland.

When the Court of Session was founded in 1532, it consisted of the Lord President, 14 Ordinary Lords and three or four Extraordinary Lords. The Extraordinary Lords were nominees of the Monarch of Scotland, and did not need to be legally qualified; Extraordinary Lords were unsalaried, and free to sit or not as they pleased. This may have been a device to conciliate the barons, but it facilitated royal interference in the work of the courts, and the Extraordinary Lords tended to sit only in cases where they had a personal interest.

The number of Extraordinary Lords rose to eight in 1553 but, after protest, was reduced to four and continued at around that level until 1723 when it was provided that no future vacancies should be filled. Archbishop Burnet was the last cleric to hold judicial office, being an Extraordinary Lord from 1664 to 1668, and John Hay, 4th Marquess of Tweeddale was the last Extraordinary Lord, holding office from 1721 to 1762. The practice of appointing Extraordinary Lords ceased in 1721, and the office of Extraordinary Lord was abolished by the Section 2 of the Court of Session Act 1723. Section 1 of the same restated that Ordinary Lords of Session should be legally qualified.

== Extraordinary Lords of Session ==
- 1532: Alexander Stewart, Bishop of Moray
- 1532: John, Lord Hay of Yester
- 1532: John, Lord Lindsay
- 1532: William, Lord Herries
- 1532: John, Lord Erskine
- 1533: James Stewart, Abbot of Dryburgh
- 1533: Alexander Hamilton, Abbot of Kilwinning
- 1533: Robert, Lord Maxwell
- 1533: Hugh, Lord Somerville
- 1533: George, Lord Seton
- 1533: Sir James Hamilton of Finnart
- 1534: James Hay, Bishop of Ross
- 1539: William Ruthven, 2nd Lord Ruthven
- 1539: John, Lord Erskine
- 1541: William Keith, 4th Earl Marischal
- 1541: William, Earl of Rothes
- 1541: Robert Maxwell, 5th Lord Maxwell
- 1541: John Lindsay, 5th Lord Lindsay
- 1542: George Seton, 6th Lord Seton
- 1542: Alexander, Lord Livingston
- 1542: James Ogilvy, 4th Lord Ogilvy of Airlie
- 1544: John, Lord Innermeath
- 1544: Alexander, Lord Livingston
- 1544: James, Lord Ogilvie
- 1546: Gilbert, Earl of Cassilis
- 1546: Henry Lord Methven
- 1549: Sir George Douglas of Pittendreich
- 1550: Alexander Livingston of Dunipace
- 1554: Sir Richard Maitland of Lethington
- 1554: Adam Livingstone of Dunipace
- 1561: William Keith, 4th Earl Marischal
- 1561: William Maitland of Lethington
- 1561: James Balfour, parson of Flisk
- 1562: John Wood of Tilliedavy
- 1564: Adam Bothwell, Bishop of Orkney
- 1565: Alexander, Bishop of Galloway
- 1566: Gavin Hamilton, Commendator of Kilwinning
- 1567: Sir John Wishart of Pitarrow
- 1569: Mark Kerr, Commendator of Newbattle
- 1573: Archibald Campbell, Earl of Argyll
- 1573: Robert Boyd, Lord Boyd
- 1578: John Stewart, Earl of Atholl
- 1578: Patrick Gray, Master of Gray
- 1584: James Stewart, Lord Doune
- 1584: John Graham, Earl of Montrose
- 1584: Mark Kerr, Commendator of Newbattle
- 1586: Alexander Seton, Prior of Pluscardine, later Lord Fyvie, Earl Dunfermline
- 1588: Sir John Seton of Barns
- 1592: Thomas Hamilton, later Earl of Haddington
- 1593: William Stewart, Commendator of Blantyre, later Lord Blantyre
- 1594: Sir Robert Melville, later Lord Melville
- 1596: Peter Rollock, Bishop of Dunkeld
- 1599: Alexander Elphinstone, Master of Elphinstone
- 1601: Sir Robert Melville
- 1608: Sir Alexander Drummond
- 1610: John Spottiswoode, Archbishop of Glasgow
- 1610: Alexander Livingston
- 1616: Sir George Hay
- 1616: David Carnegie, Lord Carnegie
- 1620: John Erskine, Lord Erskine
- 1622: Sir Robert Spottiswood
- 1623: Archibald Napier
- 1626: Sir Archibald Acheson
- 1626:Patrick Lindsay, Bishop of Ross
- 1628: William Graham, Earl of Menteith
- 1628: Sir Andrew Kerr
- 1629: John Scot
- 1630: John Stewart, Earl of Traquair
- 1631: William Alexander, Viscount Stirling
- 1633: Sir John Hay
- 1633: John Maxwell, Bishop of Ross
- 1634: Archibald, Earl of Argyll
- 1635: William Alexander, Lord Alexander of Tullibody
- 1639: Archibald, Lord Angus
- 1641: John Campbell, 1st Earl of Loudoun
- 1641: John, Lord Lindsay
- 1641: John Elphinstone, 3rd Lord Balmerino
- 1649: James Elphinstone, 1st Lord Coupar
- 1649: John Kennedy, 6th Earl of Cassilis
- 1661: John Lindsay, 17th Earl of Crawford
- 1661: John, Earl of Rothes
- 1661: John, Earl of Lauderdale
- 1662: John Middleton, 1st Earl of Middleton
- 1664: John Hay, 2nd Earl of Tweeddale
- 1664: Alexander Burnet, Archbishop of Glasgow
- 1667: Alexander Bruce, 2nd Earl of Kincardine
- 1668: James Graham, 2nd Marquess of Montrose
- 1669: John, Earl of Dunfermline
- 1673: John, Earl of Atholl
- 1674: Archibald Campbell, 9th Earl of Argyll
- 1680: Alexander Stuart, 5th Earl of Moray
- 1681: William, Earl of Queensberry
- 1682: James, Earl of Perth
- 1684: Charles Middleton, 2nd Earl of Middleton
- 1686: William Douglas-Hamilton, Duke of Hamilton
- 1686: Patrick, Earl of Strathmore
- 1693: William Douglas, 1st Duke of Queensberry
- 1693: William Johnstone, 1st Marquess of Annandale
- 1693: Patrick, Lord Polwarth, later Earl of Marchmont
- 1693: William Douglas-Hamilton, Duke of Hamilton
- 1694: Archibald, Earl of Argyll
- 1696: James Douglas, 2nd Duke of Queensberry
- 1699: Hugh Campbell, 3rd Earl of Loudoun
- 1704: John Campbell, 2nd Duke of Argyll
- 1708: Archibald, Earl of Ilay
- 1712: John Murray, 1st Duke of Atholl
- 1721: John Hay, 4th Marquess of Tweeddale

== See also ==
- An historical account of the senators of the College of Justice : from its institution in MDXXXII, by George Brunton, pp xlvii-xlviii
