= Robert Spottiswood =

Scottish lawyer

Sir Robert Spottiswood (Spottiswoode, Spotiswood, Spotswood), Lord Newabbey of New Abbey and Dunipace (1596 – 16 January 1646), was a Scottish lawyer, Lord President of the Court of Session and member of the Privy Council to James VI of Scotland, and Lord President of the College of Justice and Secretary for Scotland, appointed by Charles I of Scotland.

== Early life and education ==
He was the second son of John Spottiswoode (1565–1637), archbishop of St. Andrews, and wife Rachel Lindsay, daughter of David Lindsay, bishop of Ross, and first wife Joneta Ramsay.

Educated at Glasgow Grammar School, he matriculated at Glasgow University in 1609, graduating M.A. 15 March 1613. Thence, he proceeded to Exeter College, Oxford, where he was a student of John Prideaux, afterwards bishop of Worcester. He pursued his studies on the continent, chiefly in France, where "he applied himself to the study of the laws civil and canon, and of theology, especially the oriental languages, the holy scriptures, the fathers, and church history". His father had projected his 'History of the Church' before Spottiswood began his travels and he was commissioned to make researches for documents, many of which had been carried to France during the Reformation.

In this search, Sir Robert was very successful, recovering many important papers used by the archbishop, and discovering at Rome the Black Book of Paisley, a manuscript of great value. After spending nine years abroad, Spottiswood returned home, and was received with favour by James VI, who appointed him privy councillor on 25 June 1622.

In 1629, Sir Robert married Bethia, daughter of Sir Alexander Morrison of Prestongrange, one of the senators of the College of Justice, and by her had four sons (including Alexander, father of John Spottiswood, 1666–1728) and three daughters. She died in 1639 and a copy of memorial verses in Latin is in the manuscript of the Practicks, now in Edinburgh.

== Career ==
Sir Robert was promoted to the bench on 12 July 1622, taking the title of Lord Newabbey from the lands which his father had purchased and presented to him. Four years later (14 February 1626), he was appointed an ordinary lord of session, in succession to Sir Thomas Hamilton, Earl of Melrose (afterwards Earl of Haddington). In 1633, he was nominated as one of the commissioners for the valuation of teinds and, at the same time, was appointed one of the members of the commission to survey the laws. He continued in favour during the reign of Charles I and, on the death of Sir James Skene of Curriehill in October 1633, Spottiswood was, on Charles's recommendation, elected Lord President of the Court of Session. His speech on that occasion, in which he described the relations then existing between the bench and the bar, is printed in the memoir by his grandson, John Spottiswood (1666–1728), in his edition of Sir Robert's 'Practicks,' and in the first volume of the 'Spottiswoode Miscellany.'

Sir Robert was one of the crown assessors for the trial of John Elphinstone, Lord Balmerino in 1634 and it was afterwards alleged – without much foundation – that he gave a partial and unfair aspect to the case. His attitude was so distinctly against the Covenanters that, in 1638, when the Scottish Episcopal Church was abolished by the general assembly, he was forced to flee to England, where he remained until Charles I made his second visit to Scotland.

The dominant Presbyterian party accused him of fomenting discord between the king and the Scottish people and, when he appeared before the Scottish parliament on 17 August 1641, he was committed to Edinburgh Castle. He was exempted specially from the act of oblivion proposed to parliament, but on 10 November, he obtained his liberty on condition that he should appear for trial when called for. The intention of bringing him and the other 'incendiaries' to trial was at length abandoned, in deference to the King's wish, and Spottiswood returned with King Charles I to England. When William Hamilton, Earl of Lanark, the secretary of state, was apprehended in December 1643, the king gave the seals of office to Spottiswood at Oxford, and directed him to act as secretary.

In this capacity, Spottiswood sealed several commissions, one being a warrant appointing Montrose to be his majesty's lieutenant in Scotland. Sir Robert set out from Oxford with this warrant, travelled through Wales to the Isle of Man, shipped thence to Lochaber, and, meeting Montrose in Athol, where he gave him the Royal commission.

Remaining with Montrose, Spottiswood was present at the battle of Philiphaugh on 13 September 1645, and was taken prisoner. He was taken to Glasgow, and removed thence to St. Andrews, where he was tried by Parliament on the charge of having purchased the office of Royal Secretary without the consent of the Scottish Parliament, and also with having joined with Montrose against the Covenanters. In his own defense, Sir Robert pleaded that he had taken the office of secretary at the King's command, temporarily and by necessity, and he urged that, though he had been with Montrose, he had not borne arms, and also that he had received promise of quarter before he surrendered.

On 10 January 1646, the case came on for hearing. The last defence was repelled and, after long debate, Spottiswood was sentenced to death on 16 January. He was executed at the market cross of St. Andrews on 20 January 1646. On the scaffold, he maintained his customary courage and dignity. He was not allowed to address the spectators, but he had his speech printed beforehand, and it was distributed among the multitude. A copy of it is printed in the memoir preceding the Practicks, and also in Wishart's edition of the Memoirs of Montrose.

The character of Spottiswood has been estimated variously according to the sectarian opinions of his critics. While Wishart describes him as an Episcopalian martyr whose chief crime was being the son of Archbishop Spottiswoode, Baillie denounces him as a partial and corrupt judge, and seems to regard his violent end as a meet punishment for his alleged unfairness to Lord Balmerino. Modern opinion is generally that that Spottiswoode fell victim to Covenanter retaliation for the anti-Presbyterian policies of King Charles I.

Sir Robert's only work is his 'Practicks of the Law of Scotland,' the manuscript of which is now in the Advocates' Library, Edinburgh. It was published by his grandson, John Spottiswood, advocate, in 1706, with a memoir.

== Family ==
Sir Robert married in 1629 Bethia Morison, eldest daughter of Sir Alexander Morison of Prestongrange, one of the Senators of the College of Justice, and wife Eleanor Maule. They had three sons:

- John Spottiswood, died in Ireland shortly before the Restoration of Charles II of Scotland in 1660.
- Alexander Spottiswood, succeeded to the Barony of Spottiswoode. His descendants resided at Spottiswoode, the hereditary estate.
- Dr. Robert Spottiswoode, appointed by Charles II of Scotland physician to the Governor and Garrison of Tangier, Morocco. He went there with the John Middleton, 1st Earl of Middleton. Dr. Robert married Catherine Maxwell Elliott (c. 1638 - December 1709), widow of George Elliott, and had one son:
  - Alexander Spotswood

== Sources ==
- Dictionary of National Biography,1885–1900, volume 53
- Seldens of Virginia and allied families, Volume 2 (1911) by Mary Seldon Kennedy
- A Genealogical and Heraldic Dictionary of the Landed Gentry of Great Britain and Ireland (1852) by Sir Bernard Burke.
- Murder of Sir Robert Spottiswoode',The Spottiswoode Miscellany:A Collection of Original Papers and Tracts Illustrative Chiefly of the Civil and Ecclesiastical History of Scotland, Volume 1 (Edinburgh, 1844), pp. 201–212.

Political offices
Preceded by The Duke of Hamilton	Secretary of State, Scotland; 1644; With: The Duke of Hamilton	Succeeded by The Earl of Lothian
Legal offices
Preceded by Sir James Skene of Curriehill	Lord President of the Court of Session; 1633–46	Succeeded by Sir John Gilmour of Craigmillar
