= Prestongrange Museum =

Industry museum in Prestongrange, Scotland

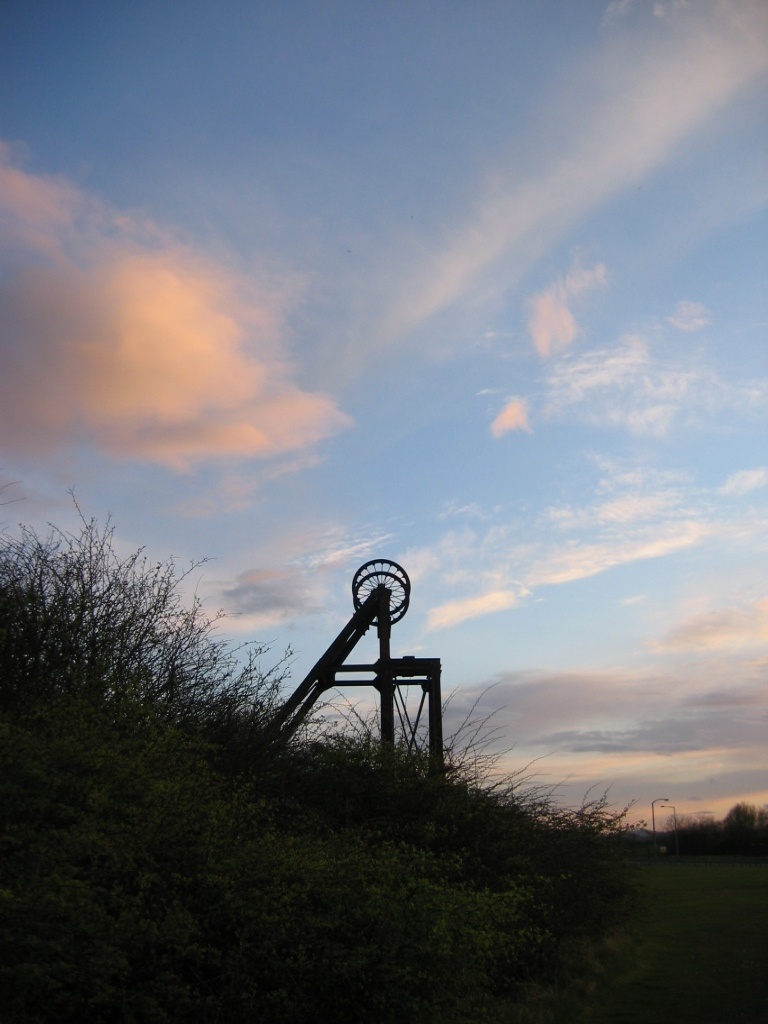
- The colliery winding gear
- Established: 28 September 1984
- Location: 8 miles east of Edinburgh
- Coordinates: 55.955°N 2.997°W
- Type: Industrial archaeology
- Website: www.prestongrange.org

Prestongrange Museum is an industrial heritage museum at Prestongrange between Musselburgh and Prestonpans on the B1348 on the East Lothian coast, Scotland. Founded as the original site of the National Mining Museum, its operation reverted to East Lothian Council Museum Service (the current operators) in 1992.

== History of the site ==
For centuries, Prestongrange was a place of intense industrial activity. A harbour, glass works, pottery, colliery, and brickworks have all left their marks on the landscape. Monks from Newbattle Abbey first mined for coal in the area in the 12th century. From that, a coal mining industry developed and the first shaft of Prestongrange's last mine was sunk in 1830. A beam engine, modified by Harvey and Company of Hoyle in Cornwall and shipped to Scotland in 1874, pumped water out of the pit in three stages at 2,955 litres a minute. The mine was eventually closed in 1963.

Cradled by woodland with views out over the Firth of Forth, the site is now a haven for wildlife where visitors are free to roam and explore monumental relics of Scotland's industrial heritage and discover giant machines such as the pit head winding gear and the Cornish beam engine, structures such as the powerhouse and a vast brick kiln, as well as coal wagons, a steam crane and more besides.

The pump house and pump is a Category A listed building. The old generating house and the Hoffmann kiln are both Category B listed.

== Development of Prestongrange Museum ==
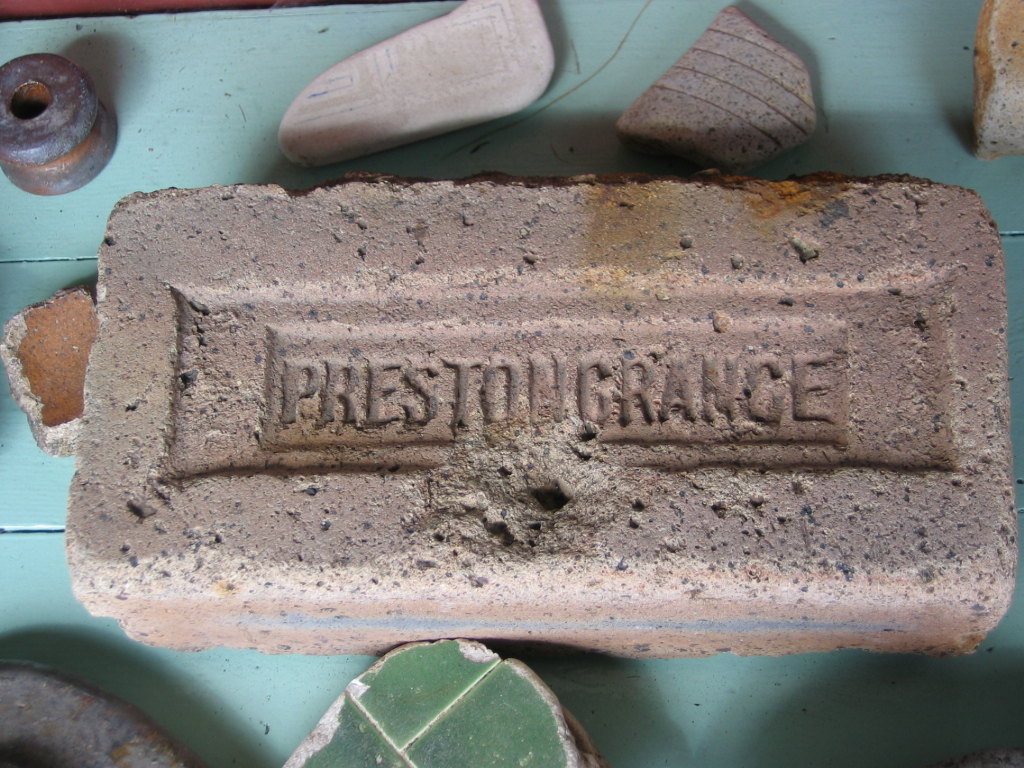
Brick in the museum's collection

By the early 1960s, the strategy of the National Coal Board meant that all of East Lothian's and most of Midlothian's collieries were earmarked for closure. At the same time, within the coalfield community, there was an awareness that technology and culture was also changing and much that was of significance was in danger of being lost forever.

Prestongrange Colliery had closed in 1962 and the site began to be cleared. However, work stopped when a new plan to turn the site into a museum was adopted. The museum was the idea of David Spence, a retired mining engineer. A steering committee was formed in 1968. Volunteers worked to clear the site and assemble exhibits. The National Mining Museum was formally launched at Prestongrange on 28 September 1984.

Prestongrange had three key merits as a museum site. First, the estate features in the earliest written account of collieries in Scotland, often dated to 1180–1210. Second, the existing colliery included the first deep shaft in Scotland, which Matthias Dunn of Newcastle sank in 1830 to the Great Seam at 420 feet (128 m). Third, the colliery housed the last Cornish beam engine remaining in situ in Scotland.

Artefacts were collected from around the coalfield and stored at Prestongrange. The interior of the beam engine house and the colliery power station became galleries. With the closure of Lady Victoria Colliery at Newtongrange in 1981, the ambitions of the steering group expanded to include that site. After operating together from 1984 to 1992, Prestongrange was withdrawn from the National Mining Museum by East Lothian District Council and recast as Prestongrange Industrial Heritage Museum to encompass the area's other once significant but vanished industries – salt boiling, chemical synthesis (particularly sulphuric acid), soap making, glass making, potteries, industrial ceramics and bricks.

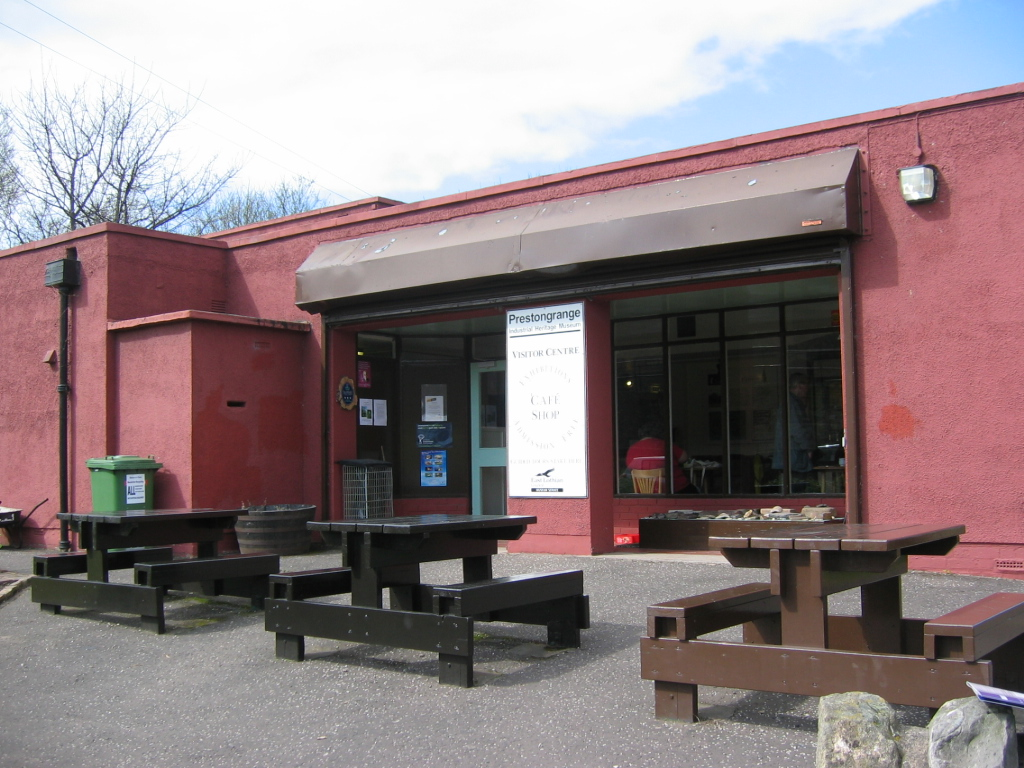
The Visitor Centre

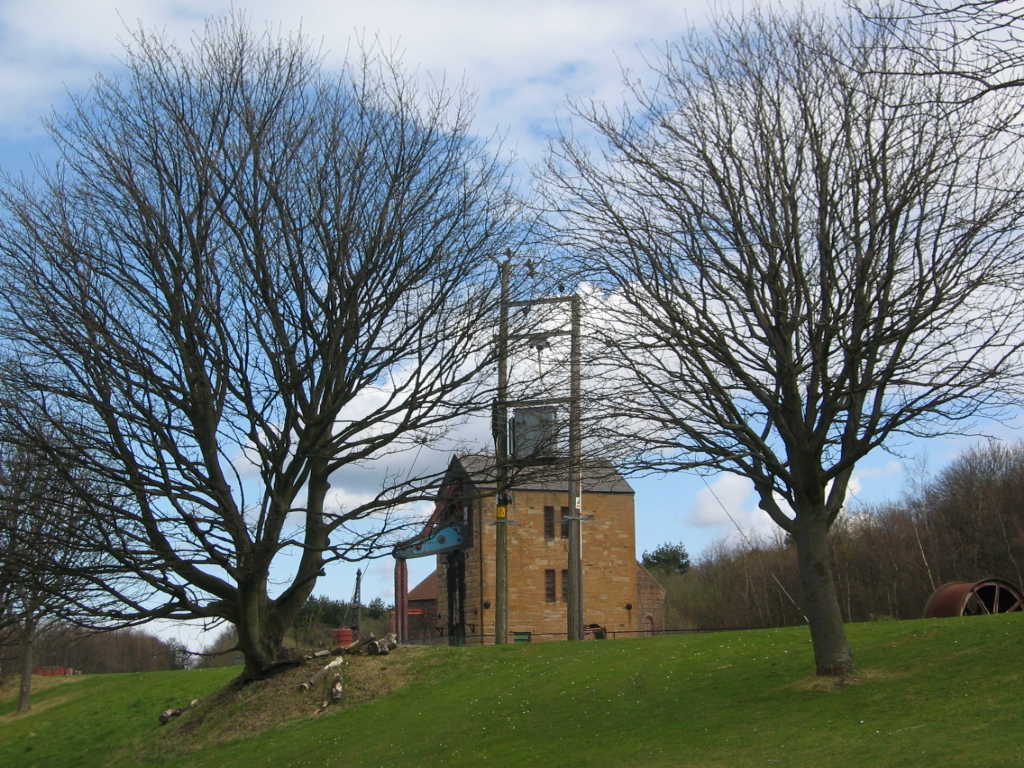
The beam engine house, showing the 'outer' (pump) end of the beam.

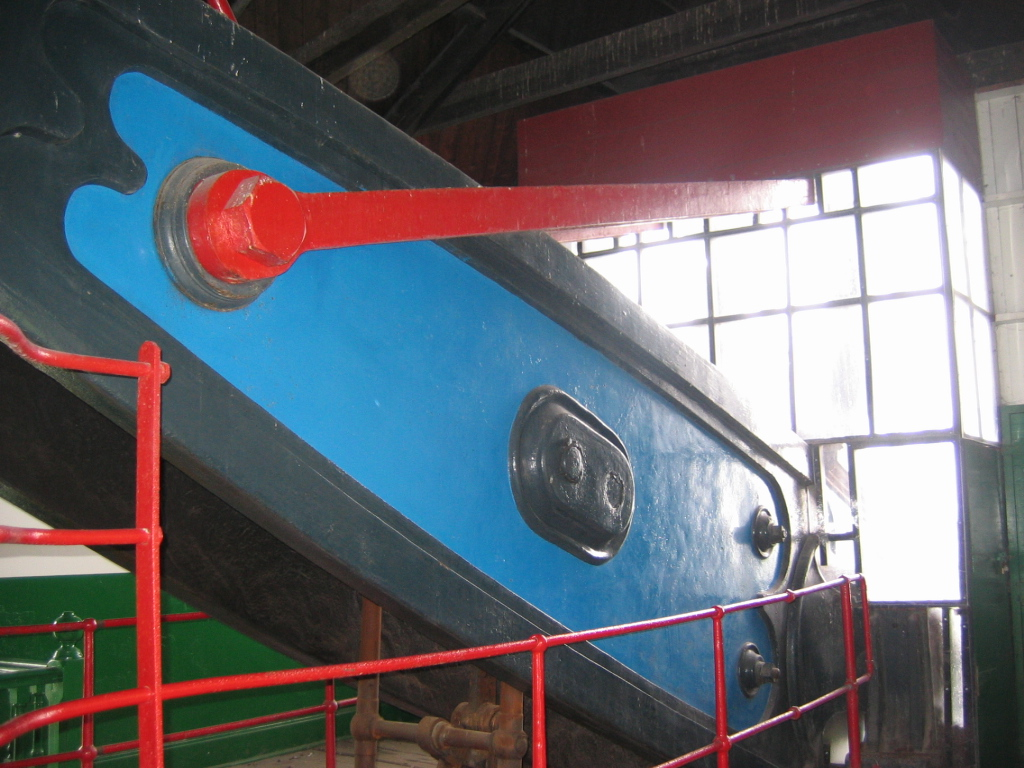
The 'inner' (cylinder) end of the beam engine.

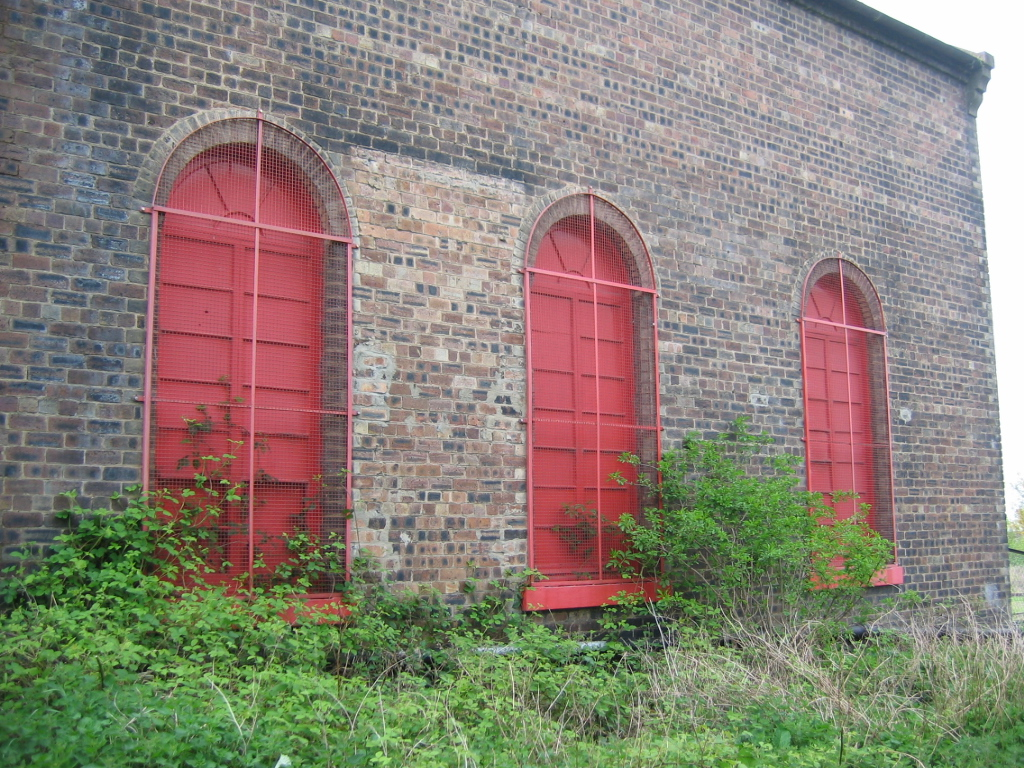
The powerhouse

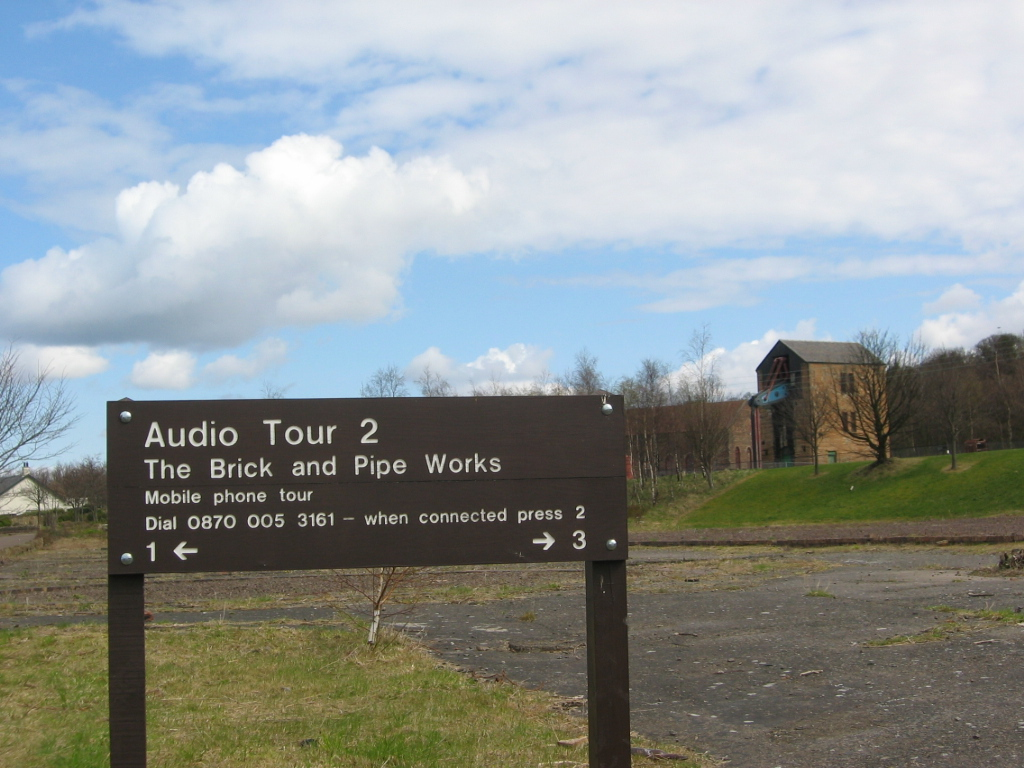
Beam engine & Audio Tour

== Main features ==
- the Hoffmann Kiln (or, more precisely, the Hoffmann Continuous Kiln)
- the Cornish engine (a type of beam engine) the only one in Scotland
- the winding engine
- the Power House
- the 17th century glass works
- the 18th century pottery site
- the 19th century coal mine and brick works
- Morrison's Haven, the 16th century harbour
- the railway (remains) and rolling stock
- the Visitor Centre with its exhibition

== Beam engine ==
The beam engine is a Cornish engine, an early type of steam engine, used to pump water from the coal mine to prevent the workings from becoming flooded. It was manufactured by J. E. Mare & Co of Plymouth to the design of engineers Hocking & Loam and used in three different mines in Cornwall before being purchased by the Prestongrange Coal and Iron Company in 1874 and shipped north. It was bought from a Cornish Mine site by Harvey and Company of Hayle, who sold it on to Prestongrange complete with a new beam of their own manufacture. The engine was installed in a new engine house, whose front wall is nearly 7 feet (2.1 m) thick in order to support the main pivot bearing of the huge cast iron beam.

The engine continued operating until 1954, when it was superseded by electric pumps, only eight years before the colliery closed. The engine is the only example in Scotland.

== Facilities ==
A self-guided tour by mobile phone is available, and it is narrated by the painter John Bellany who was born in Port Seton.

The museum is also the gateway to the annual Three Harbours Festival, jointly organised by the communities of Prestonpans, Prestongrange, Cockenzie, Port Seton and other nearby areas such as West Pans and Drum Mhor.

The museum grounds are also used for local events, guided tours, theatrical performances, and during the re-enactments of the Battle of Prestonpans. Since the completion of the Prestonpans Tapestry in July 2010, there is a possibility that this artwork may find a temporary or permanent home at Prestongrange.

== See also ==
- Industrial archaeology
- European Route of Industrial Heritage (ERIH)
- List of places in East Lothian
