= Mark Kerr (abbot) =

Scottish churchman, abbot of Newbattle

Mark Kerr or Ker (died 1584) was a Scottish churchman who became abbot of Newbattle, and then joined the reformers.

== Life ==
Kerr was the second son of Sir Andrew Kerr of Cessford, by Agnes, daughter of Robert Crichton, 2nd Lord Crichton of Sanquhar. In 1546 he was promoted abbot of Newbattle, and on renouncing Catholicism in 1560 continued to hold the benefice in commendam.

Kerr was one of those who, on 26 April 1560, signed at Edinburgh the contract to defend the "evangell of Christ'". Subsequently, he was presented to the vicarage of West Linton, Peeblesshire, by the abbot and convent of Kelso, and his presentation was confirmed by the commissioners 4 August 1567, in opposition to one made by the crown. At a parliament held at Edinburgh on 15 December of this year he was appointed one of a commission to inquire into the jurisdiction that should pertain to the kirk. On 20 April 1569 he was nominated an extraordinary lord of session, and he was also chosen a member of the privy council. By one of the articles of the Pacification of Perth in February 1572-3 he was nominated one of the judges for the trial "of all attempts committed against the abstinence be south the water of Tay".

On the fall of Regent Morton in 1578, Kerr was one of the extraordinary council of twelve appointed to carry on the government in the king's name. He was also one of the four delegates deputed on 28 September, after Morton had seized Stirling Castle, to meet Morton's delegates for the purpose of arranging the terms of a reconciliation. Receiving in 1581, after the second fall of Morton, a ratification of the commendatorship of Newbattle, he continued to be a loyal supporter of Esmé Stewart, 1st Duke of Lennox, the favourite of James VI.

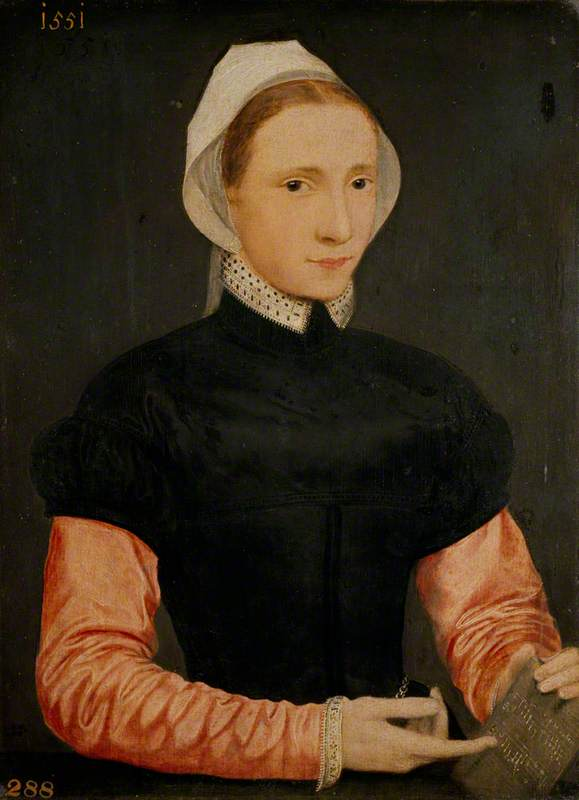
Helen Leslie, Lady Newbattle, attributed Willem Key

On 14 February 1581 Kerr met the English diplomat Thomas Randolph in Edinburgh and asked for a safe-conduct, a travel document, for Lord Seton to go as ambassador to the English court. Randolph refused, as Seton's politics had not previously favoured England, and Kerr took his answer to the king.

Esmé Stewart gave Kerr a "buffet" or cupboard, a key piece of furniture in domestic ritual, for his hall at Prestongrange House and the room was painted for him in 1581 with vivid emblems and comic figures copied from a French illustrated book Richard Breton's Songes drôlatiques de Pantagruel.

On 15 July 1581 Kerr was appointed to hear and report on the case of Sir James Balfour, who was endeavouring to be reinstated in his rights of citizenship. After the raid of Ruthven Kerr was, with Lord Herries, despatched by Lennox with offers of conciliation to the now dominant party. The proposals were rejected.

Kerr died in August 1584.

== Family ==
By his wife, Lady Helen Leslie, a daughter of George Leslie, 4th Earl of Rothes, Kerr had four sons:

- Mark Kerr, 1st Earl of Lothian;
- Andrew of Fenton;
- George, the Catholic emissary, in whose possession the "Spanish blanks" were found, and
- William;

and a daughter, Catherine, married to William Maxwell, 5th Lord Herries of Terregles. There were portraits of Kerr and his wife, ascribed to Sir Antonio More, preserved at Newbattle.
