= Preston baronets of Airdrie (1628) =

Escutcheon of Preston of Airdrie

The Preston baronetcy, of Airdrie in the County of Fife, was created in the Baronetage of Nova Scotia on 22 February 1628 for John Preston. He was the son of John Preston, Lord Fentonbarns and his first wife Elizabeth Fawside.

John Preston, 1st Baronet, married Elizabeth Turnbull who was heiress to the Airdrie estate. When she inherited the estate, in 1614, it consisted of "the lands of Airdrie, Baclany, Redwalls, Sypsies, and Pinkarton, with some other lands in the immediate neighbourhood, but also Thomaston, Mains of Pittencrieff, Kirkfield of Cupar, Glaidny, Overkellie, Arncroach, Pitkiery, and various other small tenements."

One of the Preston Baronets built a mansion house, Prestonhall, some 15 miles west of Airdrie on a site which now lies on the eastern outskirts of Cupar.

The 3rd Baronet sold the estate in 1673.

== Preston baronets, of Airdrie (1628) ==
- Sir John Preston, 1st Baronet (1583 – c. 1655)
- Sir John Preston, 2nd Baronet (died 10 June 1660)
- Sir John Preston, 3rd Baronet (died March 1675)
- Sir John Preston, 4th Baronet (died c. 1731) (Note: Two sources state that the 3rd Baronet married Jean, eldest daughter of Sir James Lumisdaine of Innergellie in 1670. One of those sources states that "he had by her a son, John, born in 1687", the other states that the 3rd Baronet died in March 1675 and that the 4th Baronet married on 16 February 1692. If the date of 1687 is correct then the 4th Baronet would have been born c. 12 years after the apparent death of the 3rd Baronet and would have married when 5 years old.)

Succession then unclear until 1784.

- Sir Robert Preston, ? Baronet (c. 1706 – c. 1792)

The descent after the death of the 4th Baronet and the accession of Robert Preston in 1784 is uncertain. The title became dormant on the latter's death c. 1792.
