= John Preston, Lord Fentonbarns =

Scottish judge

John Preston
- Born: Edinburgh, Kingdom of Scotland
- Died: 14 June 1616; Edinburgh, Kingdom of Scotland
- Occupation: Lawyer
- Known for: Lord president of the court of session
- Spouse: Lilias Gilbert

John Preston, Lord Fentonbarns (died 1616), was a Scottish lawyer and judge who became lord president of the court of session.

== Life ==
He was the son of John Preston senior, a baker by trade, a burgess, town councillor, and dean of guild in Edinburgh. John Preston was admitted advocate at the Scottish bar before 20 October 1575. He was appointed to the Commissary Court in 1580. Preston frequently appeared in cases before the privy council. On 8 March 1595 he was elected an ordinary lord of session.

Preston owned a substantial house in Blackfriars Wynd in Edinburgh, which later belonged to the Clerks of Penicuik. His main property was Fentonbarns near Dirleton. He acquired lands at Penicuik by 1609 and was sometimes called "John Preston of Pennicuik".

Preston's first attendance at the Privy Council on 24 November 1596. The same year he was, along with Edward Bruce, named king's commissioner to the general assembly of the kirk. Several further royal commissions followed. In September 1597, Preston joined a committee to advise the Scottish mint on the value of foreign silver and gold coins circulating in Scotland.

He was a member of a committee of lawyers and ministers including John Russell, Robert Rollock and the Provost Henry Nisbet who drew up a syllabus for the University of Edinburgh in July 1598 including readings from Latin authors. In January 1599, ploughmen working on his fields at Nether Liberton were threatened by Henry Wardlaw of Baberton and his armed followers. Wardlaw was arrested and imprisoned in a room above the porch of St Giles' Cathedral.

=== Royal finance and jewels ===
Preston became "Collector and Treasurer of the New Augmentation". In January 1599, James VI hoped that Preston and other exchequer officials would guarantee a sum of 1,500 crowns which he owed the goldsmith and financier George Heriot for jewels. They were minded to refuse the king. A letter from James VI of June 1599 written at Falkland Palace mentions Preston's involvement in crown finance and the royal jewels. The King had instructed him to repay a sum of money advanced on the security of some of the jewels of Anne of Denmark to George Heriot. Preston however, had reserved the money for the costs of an embassy to France. On 2 October 1601 he was named one of eight commissioners to assist the treasurer in the administration of his office. In recognition of his services James VI, on 10 February 1602, conceded to him and his wife, Lilias Gilbert, the lands of Guthrie in Midlothian, and on 30 March 1604 the lands of Penicuik with others lands in the same shire.

As a member of the Privy Council, Preston went with others to Stirling Castle in May 1603 to discuss and investigate a controversy involving Anne of Denmark who wished to take custody of her son, Prince Henry. Preston was one of the assessors at the trial in 1606 of the ministers concerned in holding the Aberdeen assembly. He was elected vice-president of the court of session on 23 October 1607, to act in the absence of Lord Balmerino, the president; was one of the assessors at the trial of Balmerino in 1608; and, on Balmerino's removal from the presidency, was, on 6 June 1609, chosen to succeed him.

About the end of April 1611 Preston was appointed one of a council of eight—the New Octavians—in whom the financial offices of the treasurership, the collectorship, and the comptrollership were vested. He died on 14 June 1616.

== Marriages and Children ==
Escutcheon of Preston of Airdrie

John Preston first married Elizabeth Fawside (sometimes styled Fawsyd), at some point between 1580-1583. She was the widow of Mr. Clement Litill (sometimes styled Little), who was the founding benefactor of Edinburgh University Library.

In 1583, John and Elizabeth had a son, Sir John Preston (the younger) of Pennycuik.

Elizabeth Fawside died on 4 October 1583. Her estate was probated at Edinburgh Commissary Court on 7 November 1583, establishing Elizabeth's "lawful son" John Preston as her only living heir.

His second wife was Lilias Gilbert, daughter of the goldsmith Michael Gilbert and his wife Sibilla Wycht. The merchant Nathaniel Udwart or Uddert was Lilias Gilbert's nephew.

John Preston the younger (son of John and first wife Elizabeth), went on to marry Elizabeth Turnbull, daughter of William Turnbull of Airdrie (in Crail). The younger John Preston owned lands near Cupar, and built a house named Prestonhall. He gained a Baronetcy of Nova Scotia on 22 February 1628, as Preston of Airdrie.

Fentonbarns and his second wife Lilias Gilbert, had a son Michael Preston, who became laird of Fentonbarns, but was executed for murder in 1631. His daughter Katherine Preston married John Morison of Saughtonhall (1558–1615), Treasurer of the City of Edinburgh, and they were parents to Alexander Morison, Lord Prestongrange.

== Notes ==
Attribution

This article incorporates text from a publication now in the public domain: Lee, Sidney, ed. (1896). "Preston, John (d.1616)". Dictionary of National Biography. Vol. 46. London: Smith, Elder & Co.
