= Abbot of Newbattle =

The Abbot of Newbattle (later Commendator of Newbattle) was the head of the Cistercian monastic community of Newbattle Abbey, Midlothian. It was founded by David I of Scotland in 1140.

== List of abbots ==
- Radulf, 1140-1147x1150
- Amfrid, 1159-1179
- Hugh, 1179-1201
- Adam, 1201-1213
- Alan, 1213-1214
- Richard, 1214-1216
- Adam de Harcarres, 1216-1219
- Richard (I), 1219-1220
- Richard (II), 1220-1223
- Constantine, 1236
- Roger, 1236-1256
- William, 1256-1259
- Adam de Maxton, 1260-1261
- Guy, 1261-1269
- Waltheof, 1269 -1272
- Patrick (?)
- Walter (?)
- John, 1291-1296
- Gervase, 1306-1323
- William, 1328 -1345
- John de Wedel, 1329 x 1342
- Andrew, 1351
- William, 1356-1362
- Hugh de Moffet, 1366-1384 x 1392
- Nicholas, 1390
- John de Halis, 1392-1399
- John Gugy, 1402-1412x1413
- William de Manuel, 1412-1419
- Thomas de Langlandis, 1422
- Thomas Livingston, 1422
- David Croyser, 1422-1432 x 1443
- Thomas de Lundie, 1443-1458
- [William Hyriot listed in Thomas Innes's notes under 1458 (Newb. Reg., xxv.]
- Patrick Mador, 1461-1472See also Deer.
- John de Creton (Crichton), 1474
- John Atkinsoune, 1478-1482 x 1488
- Peter, x 1489
- Andrew Langlands (Longant, Longlad), 1489-1503
- John Turnbull, 1503-1520
- Edward Schewill, 1520-1529
- James Haswell, 1529-1547 [1557]

== List of commendators ==
- Mark Kerr (I), 1547-1584
- Mark Kerr (II), 1567-1587

== See also ==
- Newbattle Abbey
