= William Maxwell, 5th Lord Herries of Terregles =

Scottish politician and landowner

- Died: 1603
- Occupations: Politician and landowner

William Maxwell, 5th Lord Herries of Terregles (died 1603) was a Scottish politician and landowner.

== Biography ==
William Maxwell was the eldest son of John, fourth lord Herries, by his wife Agnes, daughter of the third Lord Herries. While still Master of Herries he was, on 15 October 1580, appointed a gentleman of the chamber of James VI. On 26 January 1582-3 he was chosen a member of the privy council in place of his father, after his death on the 20th. On 9 June 1587 he became warden of the West march. On 31 January following he was, however, denounced a rebel for not entering before the council certain of his dependents charged with oppression and depredations, and on 5 February was again summoned to appear before the council on 5 March (ib. p. 248). On the 20th the general assembly also handed in a complaint against him and others for attending mass in Dumfries (Calderwood, iv. 657); but already on 16 February he had made his submission to the king (ib. p. 677). On 3 March he was therefore released from the horn (Rey. P. C. Scotl. iv. 258); and on the 5th he came under an obligation neither to hear nor suffer mass to be said within his wardening, and also to repair to the kirk of Dumfries for the hearing of the sermons (ib. p. 259). On 1 August 1588 he was appointed a commissioner for executing the act against the Spanish Armada.

About 14 October 1595 Herries, to avenge the slaughter of John, seventh or eighth lord Maxwell in 1593, came in command of about three hundred of the Maxwells to Lockerbie to attack the Johnstones, but the latter had much the best of the encounter, many of the Maxwells being slain, and others taken prisoner; On 8 March 1595-6 he appeared before the council, and protested that by his assurance to Sir James Johnstone he should not be answerable for certain Maxwells, and that he did not include in the assurance any of the Johnstones who had taken part in the late conflict (Reg. P. C. Scotl. v. 280). On 7 July he was denounced a rebel for not appearing to give his advice regarding the quieting of the borders (ib. p. 300). Shortly thereafter he was warded in Edinburgh Castle, but on the 24th was released on promising to give caution within three days to keep good rule (ib. p. 741). On 22 March 1598-9 he was charged, under pain of rebellion, to appear before the council on 6 June to underlie such order as would be given him for the quieting of the west march (ib. p. 543). He failed to do so, and was subsequently imprisoned in Tantallon Castle, but on promising to make his men answerable to justice, he was released on 11 September (ib. vi. 31). On 20 November he and others were required to submit their feud with the laird of Johnstone to arbitration (ib. p. 46), which he agreed to do, but protested that he should "reserve his duty of blood and friendship to the Lord Maxwell", and the king admitted his protest (ib. p. 91). On 17 June he was temporarily reappointed warden of the west march, in succession to Sir John Carmichael, who had a short time previously been murdered (ib. p. 117), and on 5 July the keeping of the castle of Lochmaben was given to him (ib. p. 128); but on 13 August the wardency was conferred on Sir James Johnstone (ib. p. 155). This provoked the jealousy of the Maxwells, and on 20 May 1601 Herries was charged to answer for 'a new design against Johnstone (ib. p. 240). On 20 November he and others in Dumfries were denounced for contravening the acts of parliament 'against saying and hearing mass and entertaining priests,' and were summoned before the council on 17 December (ib. p. 312), with which summons they complied (ib. p. 327). On his appearance he was, however, warded in Edinburgh Castle for not entering James Murray to answer for the slaughter of Sir James Carmichael (ib. p. 316), but on 8 Jan. he was released on giving surety to repair to the burgh of Edinburgh and there remain during the king's pleasure (ib. p. 712). On 9 February he appeared, and bound himself not to harbour John Hamilton and other Jesuits, and to defend and support the minister of Dumfries in his office and in the discipline of the kirk (ib. p. 352). On the 28th he came under an obligation not to assist Lord Maxwell and his rebellious accomplices (ib. p. 355). In May 1602 the assembly of the kirk decided that he should be placed in charge of a minister for his better instruction and confirmation in the truth, in case he repaired to Edinburgh; but it was reported in November that he had stayed only a short time in Edinburgh (Calderwood, vi. 163, 166). He died on 11 October of the following year.

== Marriage and children ==
He married Catherine Ker or Kerr, sister of Mark Kerr, 1st Earl of Lothian. They had five sons and two daughters, including:

- John, sixth lord Herries
- Sir William Maxwell of Gribton
- Sir Robert Maxwell of Sweetheart
- Edward Maxwell
- James Maxwell
- Elizabeth Maxwell, lady Urchell
- Margaret Maxwell, lady Parton.

Peerage of Scotland
| Preceded by Agnes Maxwell | Lord Herries of Terregles c. 1555–1604 | Succeeded by John Maxwell |
