= Mark Kerr, 1st Earl of Lothian =

Scottish nobleman and politician (1553–1609)

Mark Kerr (or Ker), 1st Earl of Lothian (1553 – 8 April 1609) was a Scottish nobleman and politician. He became the first Earl of Lothian in 1606.

== Family background ==
He was a member of the "famous border family" of Ker of Cessford. He was the son of Mark Kerr, abbot of Newbattle Abbey, Midlothian, and Helen Leslie, sister of the Earl of Rothes. The House of Kerr was of Anglo-Norman and Norse lineage, and the Kerrs of Fernihirst settled in Scotland in the 13th century. Kerr and his family lived in Newbattle Abbey, a mansion occupying the site of a Cistercian abbey founded in 1140.

== Career ==
Kerr was named Vicar of Linton in 1567. He was appointed Master of Requests in 1577, a role he held until 1606. He was a gentleman of the king's chamber in 1580. In 1581, he succeeded his father as Commendator of Newbottle.

Like his father, Mark Kerr was an Extraordinary Lord of Session under king beginning in 1584, with his lands at Newbattle made into a Barony.

On 28 October 1587, he was made a Lord of Parliament as Lord Newbottle, or possibly 15 October 1591. In 1587 he was made a baron and Privy Counsellor.

In December 1593, Kerr was appointed to a committee to audit the account of money spent by the Chancellor, John Maitland of Thirlestane, on the royal voyages. The funds in question came from the English subsidy and the dowry of Anne of Denmark.

In 1604 he acted as interim Chancellor. He was created Earl of Lothian on 10 July 1606, and resigned the office of Master of Requests in the same year.

An English list of the Scottish nobility states his residences were "Morphele" and Prestongrange.

== Marriage and family ==
He married Margaret Maxwell, a daughter of John Maxwell, Lord Herries. Kerr and his wife were said to have 31 children. Their children included:

- Robert Kerr, 2nd Earl of Lothian
- Anne Kerr
- Margaret Kerr, who married James Hay, 7th Lord Hay of Yester
- Janet Kerr, who married William Cunningham, 8th Earl of Glencairn
- Jean Kerr, who married (1) Robert Boyd, Master of Boyd, (2) David Lindsay, 12th Earl of Crawford, (3) Thomas Hamilton of Robertoun. In 1623 King James made steps to help the dowager Countess of Crawford and her children, because she had been a faithful servant to Anne of Denmark.

== Death ==
He died on 8 April 1609.

His wife Margaret Maxwell was accused of causing his death through witchcraft. She died at Prestongrange House on 8 January 1617.

He was succeeded by his son Robert, 2nd Earl of Lothian. The second earl had no sons, and the title passed to his daughter Anne Kerr, Countess of Lothian. In 1631 her husband was created William Kerr, 1st Earl of Lothian.

== See also ==
- Marquess of Lothian

Peerage of Scotland
New creation	Earl of Lothian; 1606–1609	Succeeded by Robert Kerr
New creation	Lord Newbattle; 1591–1609	Succeeded by Robert Kerr
