= Prestongrange House =

Historic house in East Lothian, Scotland

Coordinates: 55.9523°N 2.9964°W

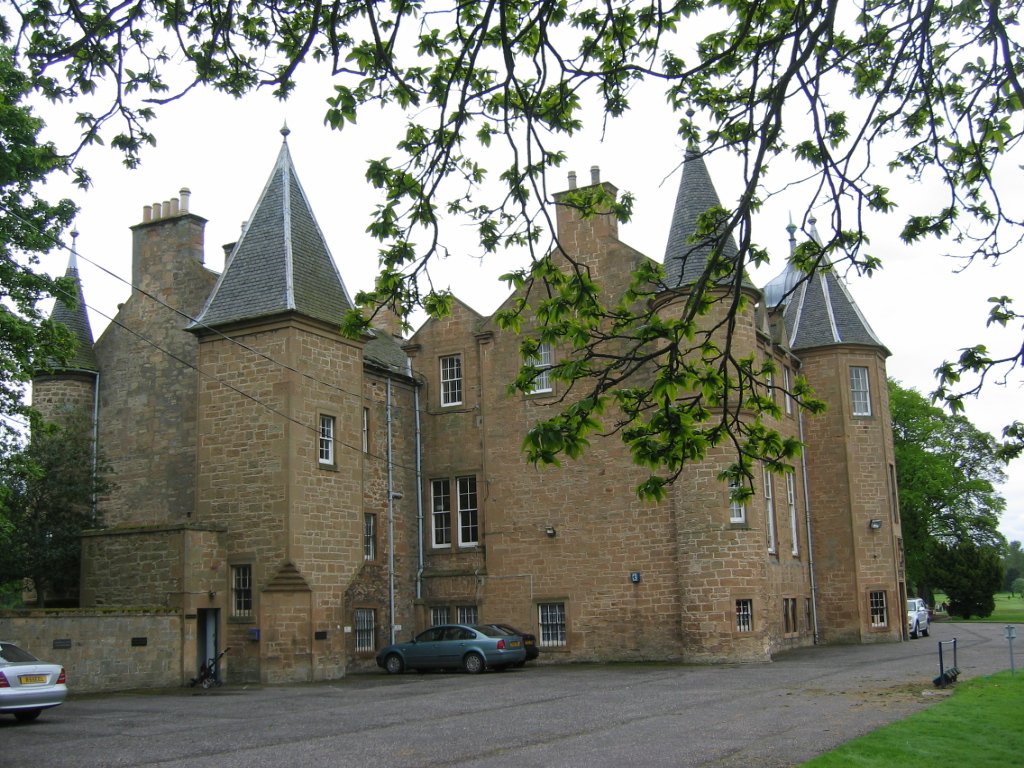
Prestongrange House

Prestongrange House is a historic house at Prestongrange near Prestonpans, East Lothian, Scotland, UK. It is situated near to two other historic houses, Hamilton House and Northfield House.

Prestongrange House is now the site of Royal Musselburgh Golf Club. The house is set in a thickly wooded park and is in the Scottish baronial style.

== History ==
Prestongrange estate was passed from Newbattle Abbey, whose monks had started coal mining at Prestongrange by the 13th century, to the Kerrs, later Earls of Lothian. Mark Kerr, 1st Earl of Lothian, received a ratification in 1587 which mentions the manor of Prestongrange. In 1609 the property was sold to the Morrison family, with Sir Alexander Morrison of Prestongrange being mentioned in sources from the 1640s, then William Morrison of Prestongrange in the 1690s and 1700s. In 1746 the estate was bought by William Grant, Lord Prestongrange who was Lord Advocate, and when his daughter, Agnes Grant, married Sir George Suttie of Balgone it passed to the Grant-Sutties. The Grant-Suttie family remained at Prestongrange until the early 20th Century. One of the most notable residents was Lady Susan Harriet Grant-Suttie, who took an active role in local politics, education, welfare and social charities. In 1925 the Royal Musselburgh Golf Club took lease of the house from the Grant-Sutties, commissioning James Braid to design their new golf course. In 1956 the house and ground were sold to the Coal Industry & Social Welfare Organisation who continue to lease the land to the golf club.

== Features ==
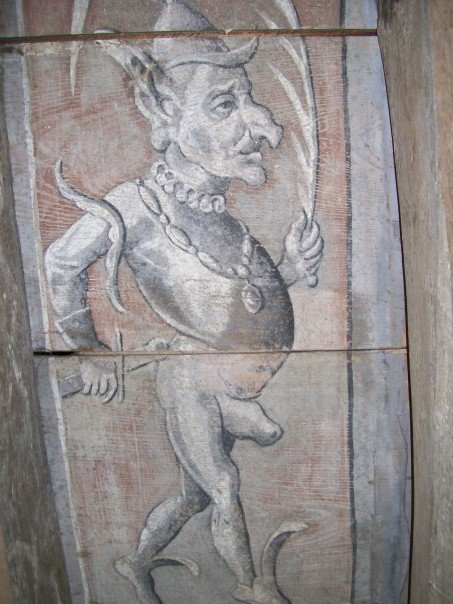
Figure from the Prestongrange House painted ceiling dated 1581

Prestongrange House, set in wooded parkland with view north over the Firth of Forth, is a large baronial mansion of three and four storeys, with square and round towers capped by ogee and conical roofs. The entrance tower has a semi-octagonal shape, the building incorporates structures which date back as far as the 15th or 16th centuries, possibly the 12th century. These older features include most of the main block and the stairtower. The house was rebuilt internally in around 1750. William Henry Playfair began work to extend the house in 1830 with the construction of a three-storey block to the south which has an octagonal entrance tower, he also added some structure to the eastern end. In 1850 Playfair added a square tower to the east of the house. Playfair's western tower is similar to work he carried out at George Heriot's School in Edinburgh and at Floors Castle near Kelso.

=== Ceiling of 1581 ===
A painted ceiling dated 1581 was rediscovered within the house in 1965. This was the finest remaining Scottish painted renaissance ceiling, and stylistically reflects the first flowering of the court of James VI. The design includes four "droll" figures which were inspired by a French illustrated book Richard Breton's Songes drôlatiques de Pantagruel. Originally, this painted hall featured a "buffet" or cupboard presented to Mark Kerr, Commendator of Newbattle, and his wife Helen Leslie, by Esmé Stewart, 1st Duke of Lennox, the favourite of James VI. The ceiling was removed and installed in Merchiston Castle tower at Napier University.

== Photo gallery ==
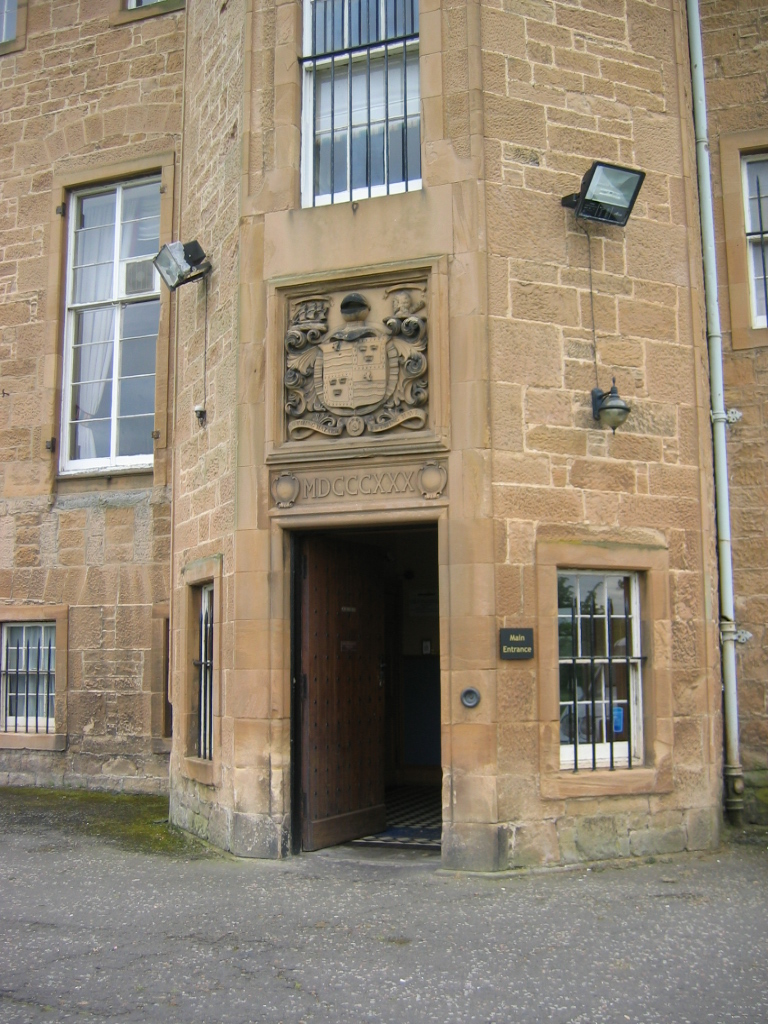
Entrance

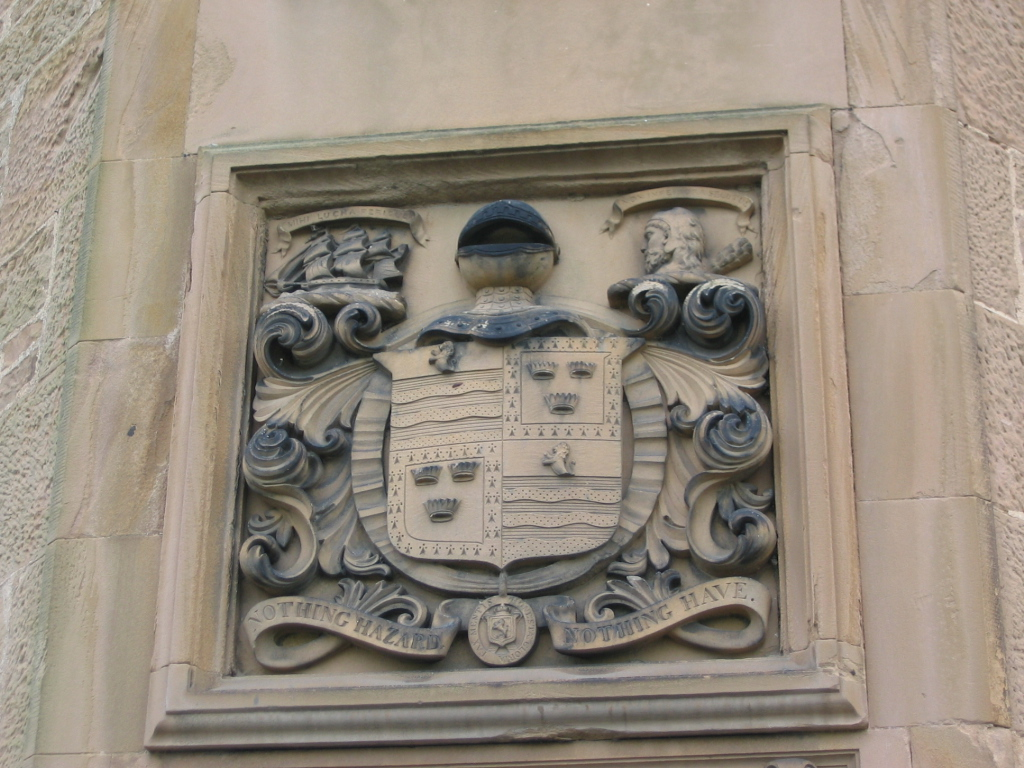
Coat of Arms

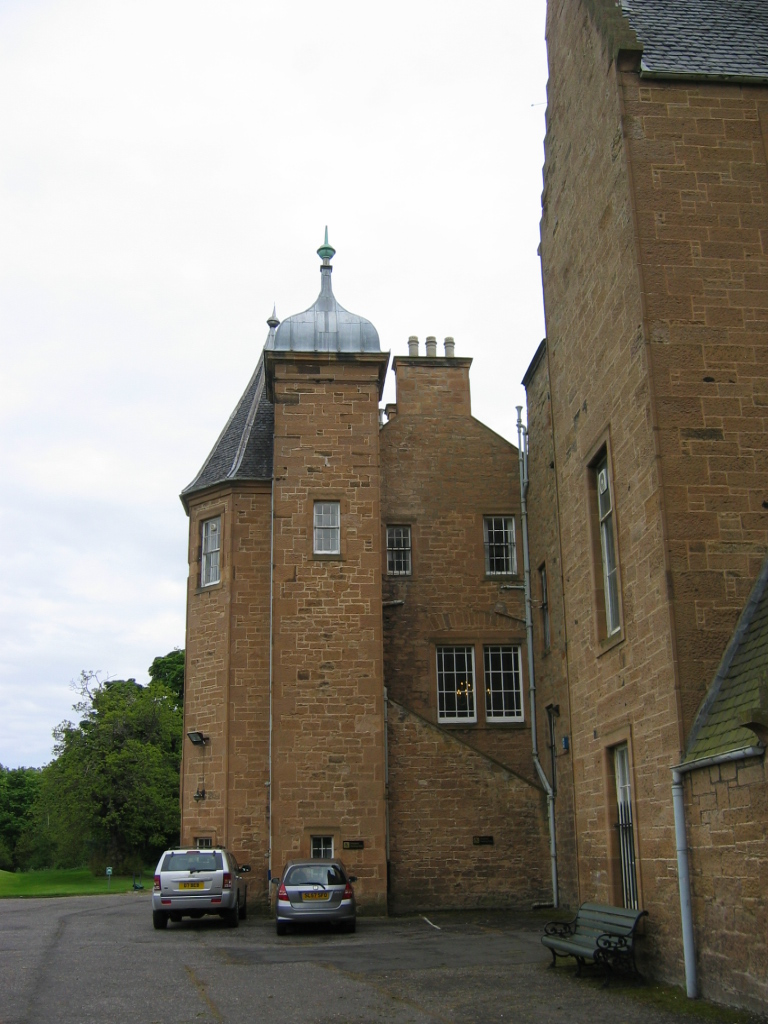
Front

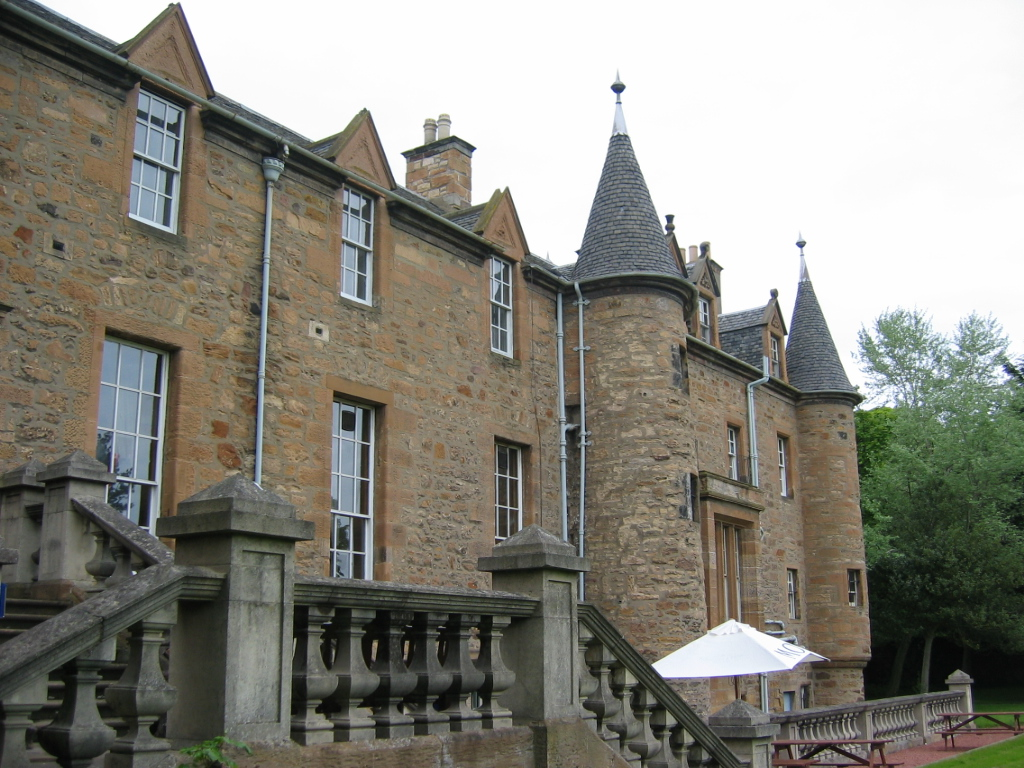
Back

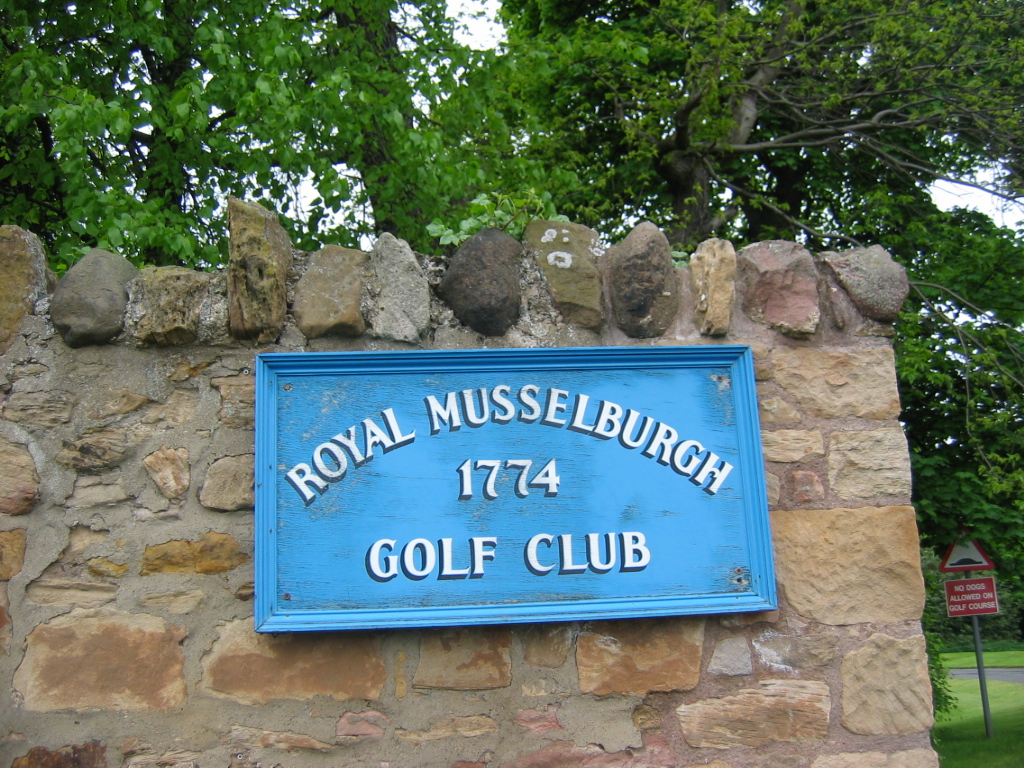
Golf Club

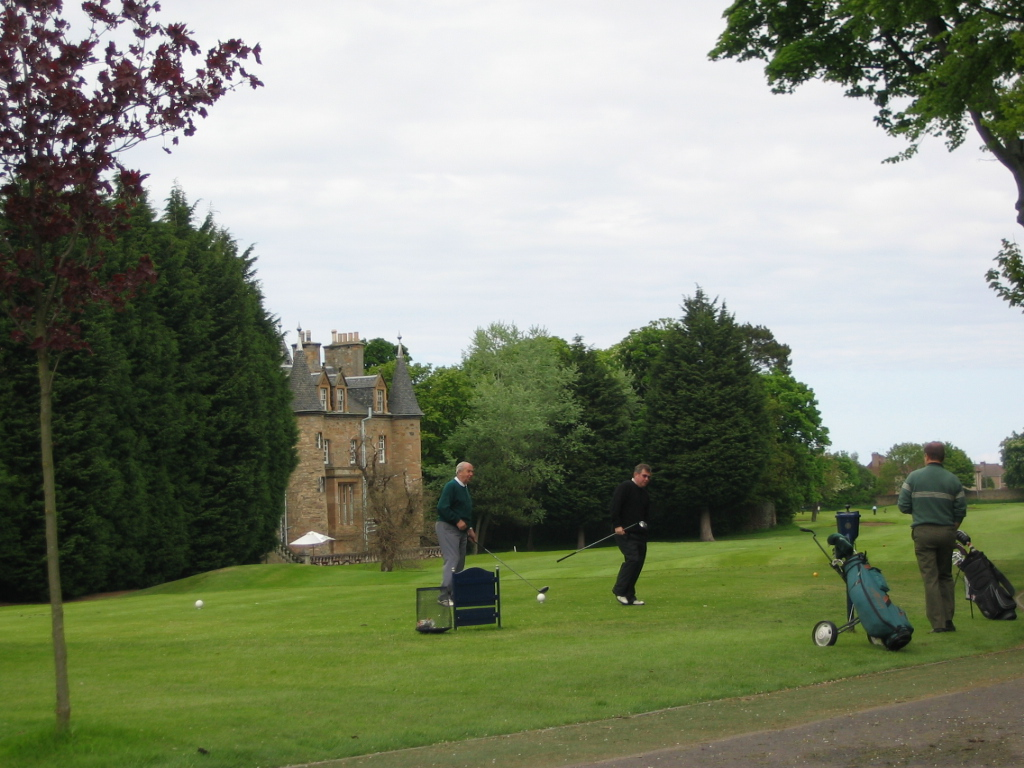
Golfers

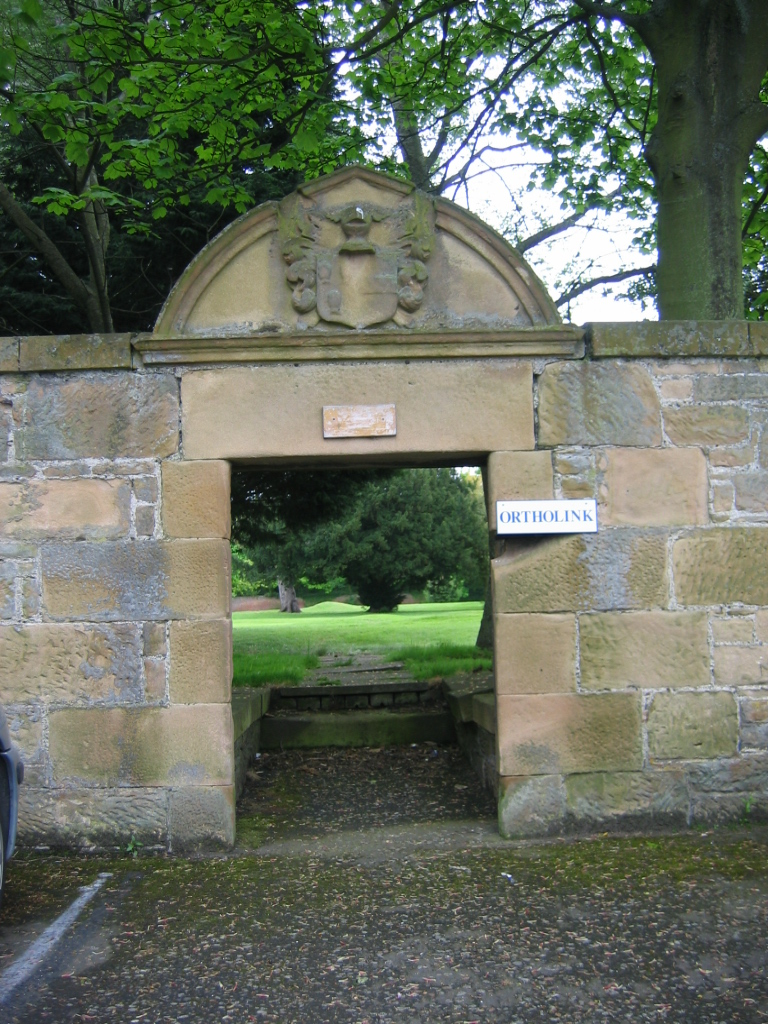
Grounds

== See also ==
- William Henry Playfair
- William Grant, Lord Prestongrange
