= Newbattle Abbey =

Abbey in Midlothian, Scotland

Coordinates: 55°52′58″N 3°04′02″W

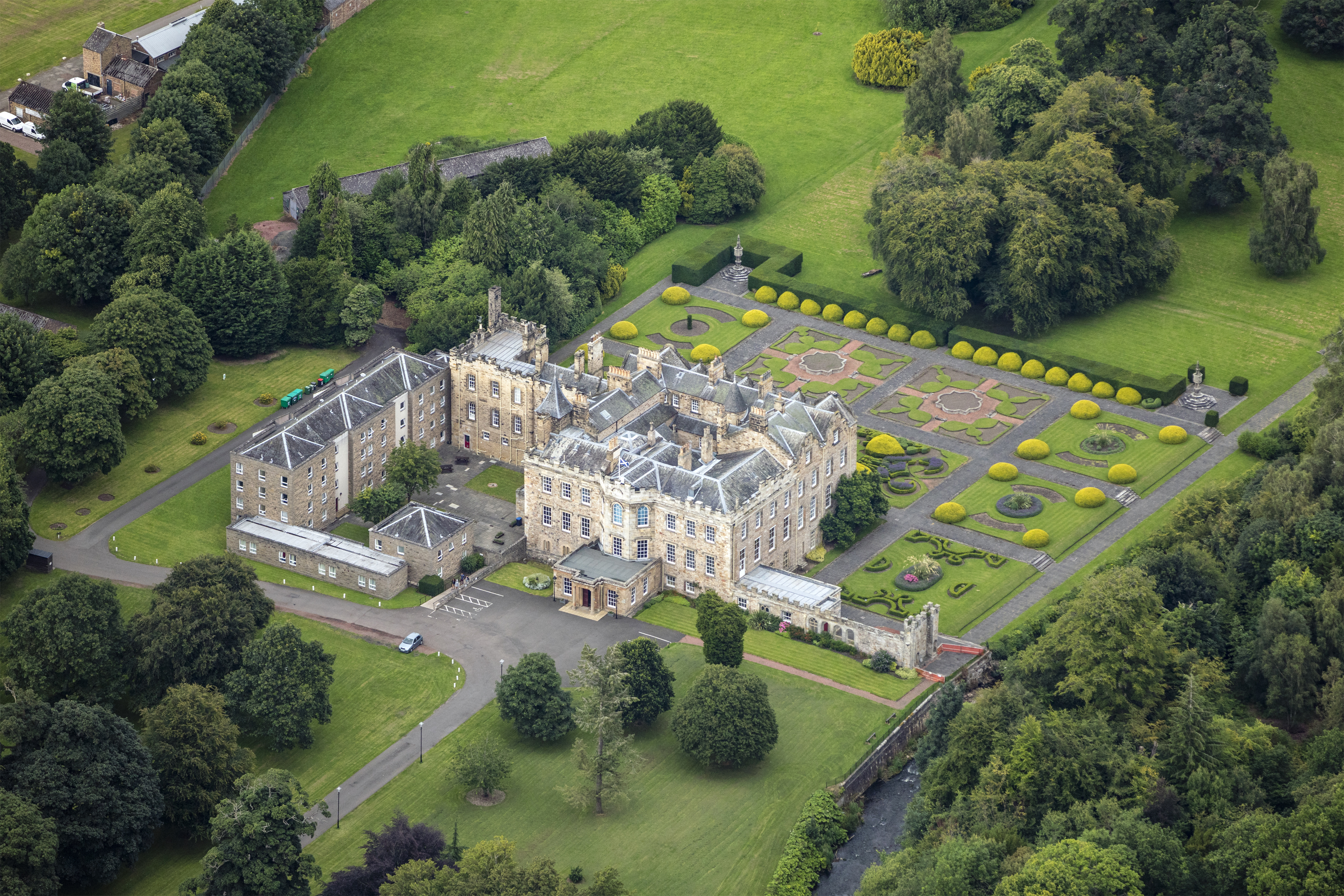
- Interactive map of Newbattle Abbey

Monastery information
- Order: Cistercian
- Established: 1140
- Disestablished: 1587
- Mother house: Melrose Abbey
- Diocese: Diocese of St Andrews
- Controlled churches: Bathgate; Clerkington; Cockpen; Eassie; Heriot; Masterton; Newbattle

People
- Founder: David I of Scotland
- Important associated figures: Thomas Livingston

Inventory of Gardens and Designed Landscapes in Scotland
- Official name: Newbattle Abbey
- Designated: 31 March 2001
- Reference no.: GDL00295

Newbattle Abbey was a Cistercian monastery near the village of Newbattle in Midlothian, Scotland, which subsequently became a stately home and then an educational institution.

== Monastery ==
It was founded in 1140 by monks from Melrose Abbey. The patron was King David I of Scotland (with his son Henry). Before 1153, the monks at Newbattle were granted rights of pannage in the royal forests of Lothian. Its church was dedicated in 1234. The abbey was burned by English royal forces in 1385 and once more in 1544. It became a secular lordship for the last commendator, Mark Kerr (Ker) in 1587.

Newbattle Abbey was a filiation of Melrose Abbey (itself a daughter of Rievaulx Abbey) and was situated, according to Cistercian usages, in a beautiful valley along the River South Esk. Rudolph, its first abbot, a strict and severe observer of the rule, devoted himself energetically to the erection of proper buildings. The church, cruciform in shape, was 240 feet in length, and the other buildings in proportion; at one period the community numbered as many as 80 monks and 70 lay-brothers.

Following its establishment, the abbey grew in wealth and gained a reputation for strict adherence to its monastic rule, with several members later appointed as bishops. It also maintained close ties with the Scottish monarchy, with numerous kings visiting regularly and providing the institution with generous patronage.

Towards the end of the 12th Century, David de Lindsay awarded land at Glengonnar, to the west of Crawford, in the upper catchment of the River Clyde, to the monks of Newbattle. His sons and grandsons extended the award and granted wider rights in the area until the middle of the 13th Century. The monastery managed its property in Clydesdale as a grange for livestock grazing and mined lead in the Lowther Hills.

One of the principal sources of income was the coal mines in its possession, for these monks were among the first, if not the first, coal miners in Scotland. The earliest mention of coal in Scotland is to be found in a charter of an Earl of Winchester, granting to them a coal mine. In 1526 King James V granted them a petition to build a harbour at Morrison's Haven, and it is from this date that Aitchison's Haven Lodge was established as a stonemason's lodge. In 1531, the Abbot of Newbattle agreed with the Abbot of Dunfermline to work his coalmine at Prestongrange so that it would drain water from the neighbouring mines (which belonged to Dunfermline Abbey) to the sea.

Newbattle suffered much from English incursions at various times, particularly in 1385 when the monastery and church were burned, and the religious either carried away or forced to flee to other monasteries; it required 40 years to repair these losses. A part of the monastery was again destroyed by the Earl of Hertford, but the destruction seems to have been chiefly confined to the church.

At the time of the Reformation but few of the monks remained, and these were pensioned by the commendator, Mark Kerr. Kerr made a timely conversion to Protestantism and was able to retain the lands around the abbey. His son, also Mark, became Lord Newbattle in 1596 and Earl of Lothian in 1606.

The monastery site, including burial grounds, traces of the chapel and cloisters and some associated buildings, is now a designated scheduled monument.

== Stately home ==
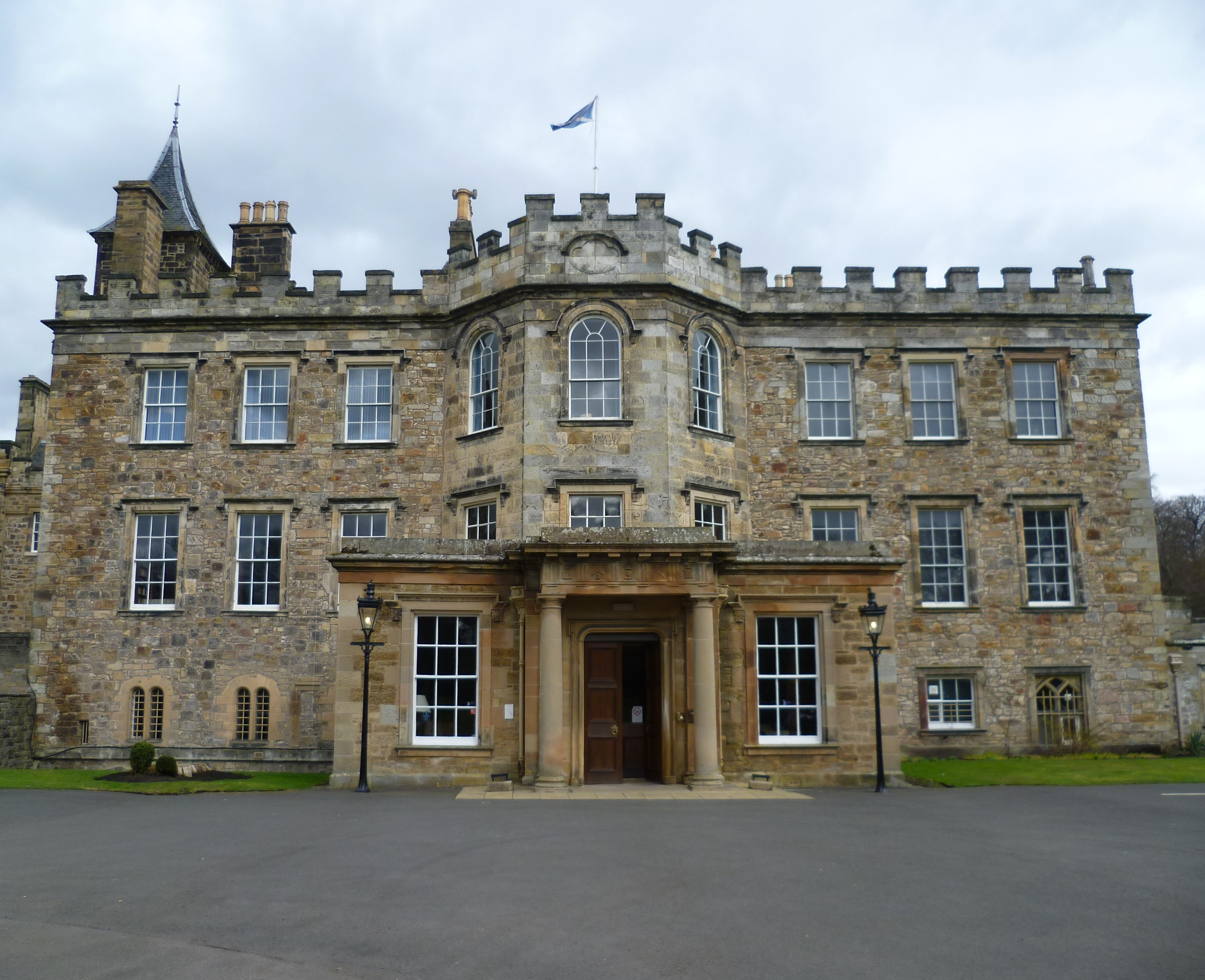
Newbattle Abbey in 2011

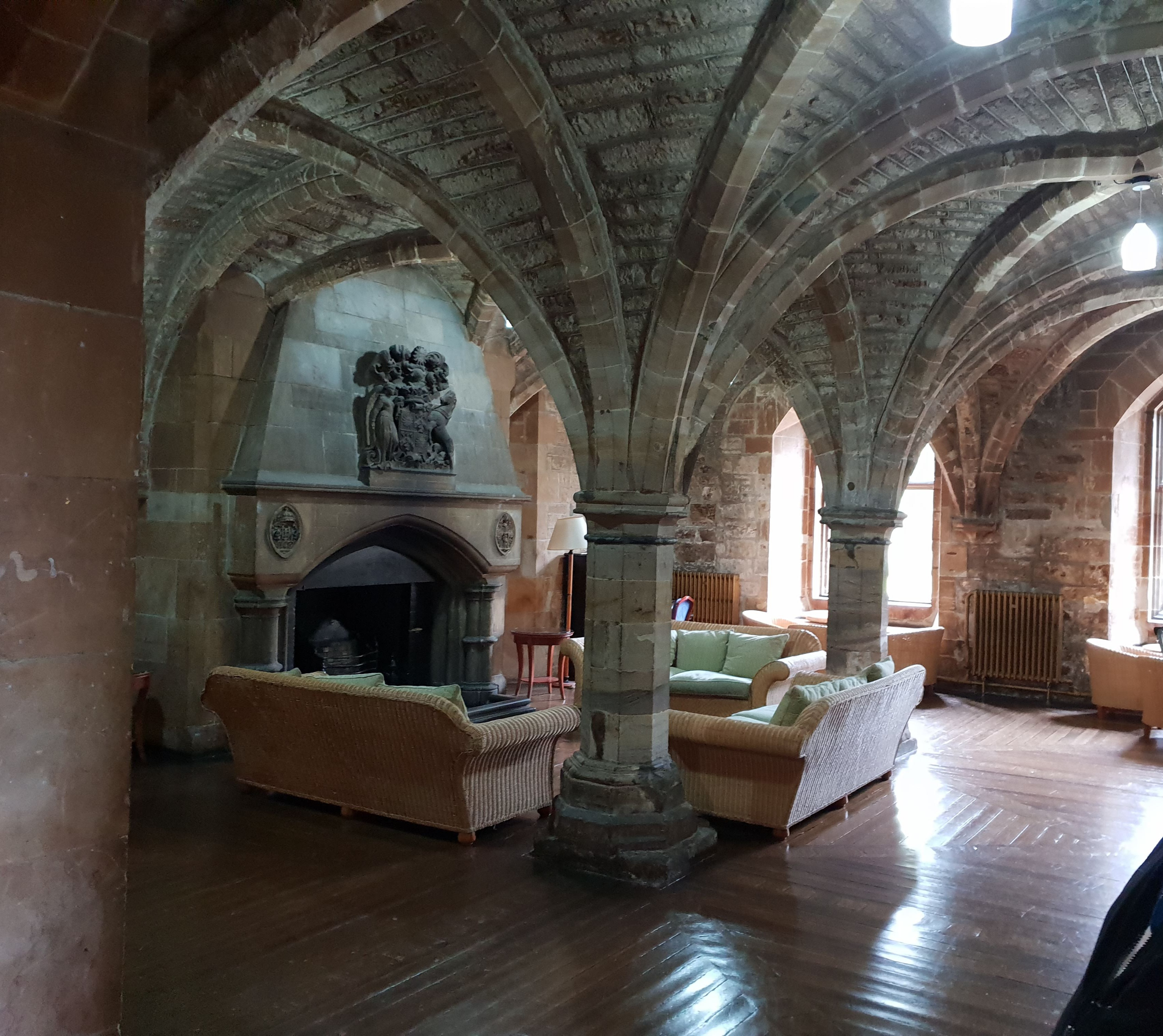
Undercroft of Newbattle Abbey College

Part of the abbey was converted into a house which survives at the core of the current building. The house incorporates part of the south end of the monastic range, with the dorter undercroft intact.

The house was modified and rebuilt successively by John Mylne in 1650, William Burn in 1836 and David Bryce in 1858. The drawing room was decorated by Thomas Bonnar around 1870. The 19th century chapel was created in a vaulted undercroft that may date from the original abbey buildings. The chapel includes a 16th-century font and a fine parquet floor, made using wood from the estate, in the style of original tile-work. The library is oak-lined and features a 17th-century moulded ceiling. The garden to the rear of the house includes a pair of large octagonal 17th century sundials. The main abbey remains lie buried to the west and north of the original house.

King George IV visited during his Scottish tour of 1822 and the King's Gate was built in his honour.

== College ==
Newbattle Abbey remained the home of the Marquesses of Lothian until being given to the nation in 1937 by Philip Kerr, 11th Marquess of Lothian, to be used as a College of Education.

The college was established under trustees from the four ancient Scottish Universities specifically for adults returning to education. New residential building was added in the 1960s and funding came through the Scottish Education Department.

In 1987 the Secretary of State for Scotland announced the intention to withdraw funding, threatening the college with closure. However, new forms of financial support have enabled the college to survive.

== Burials at the Abbey ==
- Marie de Coucy

== See also ==
- Abbot of Newbattle, for a list of abbots and commendators
- Scheduled monuments in Midlothian
