= List of Category A listed buildings in East Lothian =

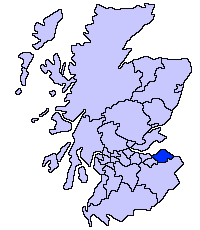
East Lothian shown within Scotland

This is a list of Category A listed buildings in the East Lothian council area in eastern Scotland.

In Scotland, the term listed building refers to a building or other structure officially designated as being of "special architectural or historic interest". Category A structures are those considered to be "buildings of national or international importance, either architectural or historic, or fine little-altered examples of some particular period, style or building type." Listing was begun by a provision in the Town and Country Planning (Scotland) Act 1947, and the current legislative basis for listing is the Planning (Listed Buildings and Conservation Areas) (Scotland) Act 1997. The authority for listing rests with Historic Scotland, an executive agency of the Scottish Government, which inherited this role from the Scottish Development Department in 1991. Once listed, severe restrictions are imposed on the modifications allowed to a building's structure or its fittings. Listed building consent must be obtained from local authorities prior to any alteration to such a structure. There are approximately 47,400 listed buildings in Scotland, of which around 8% (some 3,800) are Category A.

The council area of East Lothian covers 679 square kilometres (262 sq mi), and has a population of around 96,100. There are 124 Category A listed buildings in the area.

== Listed buildings ==
Name	Location	Date listed	Geo-coordinates	Notes	LB number	Image
Greywalls	Gullane, Duncur Road	5 February 1971	56°02′32″N 2°49′10″W	Arts and Crafts house by Sir Edwin Lutyens, 1901	1337	Upload another image See more images
St Peter's Parish Church Hall	Gullane, Main Street		56°02′06″N 2°49′50″W	Church hall by Sydney Mitchell, 1908	1363	Upload Photo
Carlekemp	North Berwick, Abbotsford Park		56°03′36″N 2°44′43″W	Elizabethan-style manor house by John Kinross, 1898	1375	Upload another image
Carlekemp Lodge	North Berwick, Abbotsford Park		56°03′31″N 2°44′43″W	Elizabethan-style gate lodge by John Kinross, 1898	1376	Upload Photo
Westerdunes	North Berwick, Abbotsford Road		56°03′26″N 2°45′17″W	Elizabethan-style manor house by John More Dick Peddie, 1908	1380	Upload Photo
Muirfield gate and gatehouse/garage (formerly known as The Pleasance)	Gullane, Duncur Road		56°02′30″N 2°49′19″W	English vernacular style house by Sydney Mitchell, 1902	1385	Upload Photo
Bunkerhill	North Berwick, Abbotsford Road		56°03′27″N 2°45′07″W	Cotswold-style mansion by Sir Robert Lorimer, 1904	1400	Upload Photo
Bolton Muir	Bolton		55°54′11″N 2°46′37″W	English vernacular-style mansion by D P Hepworth, 1930	1417	Upload Photo
Broxmouth South Lodge	Broxmouth, Dunbar		55°59′08″N 2°29′10″W	Gate lodge of circa 1740 restored 1985	1474	Upload Photo
Dirleton Castle	Dirleton		56°02′45″N 2°46′42″W	Ruins of castle dating to 13th to 16th centuries	1525	Upload another image See more images
Dirleton Parish Church, aka Dirleton Kirk	Dirleton	1971	56°02′54″N 2°47′02″W	Post-Reformation church, after 1612	1526	Upload another image See more images
Archerfield	Dirleton		56°02′50″N 2°47′43″W	Late-17th-century classical house with later additions	1536	Upload another image
Gilmerton House	Athelstaneford		55°59′26″N 2°43′27″W	18th-century house, additions by William Burn 1829	6351	Upload Photo
Pilmuir House	Bolton		55°54′52″N 2°49′24″W	House dated 1624, with early-18th-century alterations	6398	Upload Photo
Aberlady Mercat Cross	Aberlady, Main Street		56°00′34″N 2°51′39″W	18th-century mercat cross	6505	Upload another image
Aberlady Parish Church	Aberlady, Main Street		56°00′31″N 2°51′53″W	15th-century church, nave rebuilt in 1773, remodelled by William Young in 1886	6508	Upload another image See more images
Ballencrieff Granary	Ballencrieff		55°59′35″N 2°49′38″W	16th-century former house and granary	6528	Upload Photo
Gosford House	Aberlady		55°59′50″N 2°52′44″W	Classical mansion by Robert Adam, 1790	6533	Upload another image See more images
Gosford House, Hungary House	Aberlady		55°59′59″N 2°51′39″W	19th-century estate cottages	6539	Upload another image See more images
Gosford House, Mausoleum	Aberlady		56°00′01″N 2°52′27″W	Neo-classical mausoleum circa 1800	6542	Upload another image See more images
Gosford House, Stables	Aberlady		55°59′52″N 2°52′32″W	U-plan stable court by Robert Adam, 1790	6547	Upload Photo
Luffness House	Luffness		56°00′51″N 2°50′38″W	19th-century baronial house incorporating 16th-century tower house	6551	Upload another image See more images
Luffness House, Dovecot	Luffness		56°00′51″N 2°50′33″W	Late-16th-century beehive dovecot	6554	Upload another image
Nunraw Dovecot	Nunraw, Garvald		55°55′39″N 2°38′46″W	16th-century beehive dovecot	7320	Upload another image
Nunraw Old Abbey	Nunraw, Garvald		55°55′37″N 2°38′44″W	Baronial mansion by Brown and Wardrop, 1864, incorporating 15th-century keep	7321	Upload another image
Danskine Gateway	Danskine, Gifford		55°53′51″N 2°41′44″W	Early-18th-century gateway to Yester House, probably by James Smith and Alexander McGill	7329	Upload Photo
Hopes House	Longyester, Gifford		55°51′57″N 2°42′10″W	Classical mansion by James Burn, circa 1823	7342	Upload another image
Thurston Home Farm	Innerwick		55°57′45″N 2°27′32″W	Mid 19th-century steading	7711	Upload Photo
Keith Marischal Home Steading	Humbie		55°52′09″N 2°52′58″W	Early-19th-century steading	7744	Upload another image
Lennoxlove House or Lethington	Haddington		55°56′20″N 2°46′40″W	15th-century tower house enlarged in the 17th century and altered in the 19th century and in 1914 by Robert Lorimer	10814	Upload another image See more images
Lennoxlove House, Sundial	Haddington		55°56′20″N 2°46′38″W	Caryatid sundial dated 1679	10815	Upload Photo
Abbey Bridge	Amisfield Park, Haddington		55°57′42″N 2°44′58″W	Early-16th-century three-arch bridge	10820	Upload another image See more images
Stevenson House	Haddington		55°57′51″N 2°43′52″W	Early-17th-century house with substantial later additions	10821	Upload another image
Amisfield Park Walled Garden	Amisfield Park, Haddington		55°57′30″N 2°44′58″W	Neo-classical walled garden by John Henderson, dated 1786	10825	Upload another image See more images
Huntington House	Huntington, Haddington		55°57′50″N 2°49′31″W	17th-century house with 19th-century alterations	10832	Upload Photo
Huntington House, Dovecot	Huntington, Haddington		55°57′51″N 2°49′35″W	18th-century square dovecote	10833	Upload another image
Alderston Coach House	Haddington		55°57′42″N 2°48′11″W	18th-century stable block	10835	Upload Photo
St Michael's Kirk (Church of Scotland)	Inveresk, Musselburgh		55°56′14″N 3°03′04″W	Georgian church by Robert Nisbet, 1805	10880	Upload another image See more images
Catherine Lodge	Inveresk, Musselburgh		55°56′11″N 3°02′38″W	18th-century house with 19th-century addition	10886	Upload Photo
Newhailes House	Musselburgh		55°56′27″N 3°04′45″W	Classical house by James Smith, 1686	10911	Upload another image See more images
Newhailes House, Stables	Musselburgh		55°56′24″N 3°04′53″W	Late-18th-century Classical stable court	10916	Upload another image
Monkton House	Old Craighall, Musselburgh		55°55′15″N 3°04′03″W	16th- and 17th-century mansion	10919	Upload Photo
The Manor House	Inveresk		55°56′09″N 3°02′41″W	18th-century Classical villa	10935	Upload another image
Halkerston Lodge	Inveresk		55°56′08″N 3°02′40″W	House of circa 1640, restored by W Schomberg Scott, 1960	10937	Upload Photo
Inveresk Lodge	Inveresk		55°56′07″N 3°02′38″W	Late-17th-century L-plan house	10938	Upload another image See more images
Gosford House, Gateway West Lodge and Policy Walls	Aberlady		55°58′45″N 2°53′22″W	Venetian gateway by Robert William Billings, dated 1854	12711	Upload another image See more images
Phantassie Dovecot	Phantassie		55°59′16″N 2°38′52″W	18th-century beehive dovecot	14501	Upload another image See more images
Phantassie House	Phantassie		55°59′11″N 2°38′45″W	Mid 18th-century farmhouse	14503	Upload Photo
Sandy's Mill	East Linton		55°58′07″N 2°43′20″W	Mid-to-late-18th-century water mill	14519	Upload another image See more images
Prestonkirk Parish Church	East Linton		55°59′29″N 2°39′17″W	18th-century church with 13th-century chancel and 17th-century tower	14530	Upload another image See more images
Preston Mill	East Linton		55°59′32″N 2°39′04″W	18th-century water mill and kiln	14531	Upload another image See more images
Newbyth Old Mansion	Newbyth, Whitekirk		56°00′41″N 2°39′51″W	Tudor Gothic mansion by Archibald Elliot, 1817	14577	Upload another image
Tyninghame House	Tyninghame		56°00′36″N 2°36′43″W	17th-century mansion remodelled by William Burn, 1829	14586	Upload another image See more images
Tyninghame House, Sundial	Tyninghame		56°00′35″N 2°36′46″W	Replica of Newbattle Abbey sundial	14608	Upload Photo
Whitekirk Parish Church, St Mary's (Church of Scotland)	Whitekirk		56°01′30″N 2°38′58″W	15th-century parish church with 19th- and 20th-century additions	14615	Upload another image See more images
Whitekirk, Tithe Barn (or Granary)	Whitekirk		56°01′33″N 2°38′59″W	16th-century tithe barn	14617	Upload another image
Yester House Gate Lodges, Gates and Gatepiers and Railings	Gifford		55°54′02″N 2°44′39″W	Classical lodges by John Adam, 1753	14667	Upload another image
Yester House	Gifford		55°53′43″N 2°43′54″W	Classical mansion designed by James Smith and Alexander McGill, 1699-1728, with many later additions	14693	Upload another image See more images
St Bothan's Chapel, formerly St Cuthbert's Collegiate Church	Gifford		55°53′43″N 2°43′47″W	15th-century chapel remodelled by the Adam Brothers, 1753	14695	Upload another image See more images
Yester Parish Kirk	Gifford		55°54′14″N 2°44′44″W	T-plan church of 1710	14697	Upload another image See more images
Oldhamstocks Parish Church	Oldhamstocks		55°55′42″N 2°25′15″W	18th-century church with 16th-century aisle	14710	Upload another image See more images
Sydserf House	Kingston		56°01′34″N 2°44′15″W	Late-17th-century T-plan laird's house	14721	Upload Photo
Dunglass, Gazebo	Dunglass		55°56′17″N 2°22′48″W	Classical summer house dated 1712	14725	Upload Photo
Dunglass Viaduct	Dunglass		55°56′31″N 2°22′07″W	Multi-span railway viaduct by Grainger and Miller, circa 1840 (Note: Also in the Scottish Borders)	14731	Upload another image See more images
Fenton Tower	Kingston		56°01′46″N 2°44′04″W	L-plan tower house, circa 1575	14743	Upload another image See more images
Leuchie House	North Berwick		56°02′26″N 2°41′18″W	Late-18th-century classical mansion	14746	Upload another image See more images
Bower House (Bourhouse)	Bowerhouse, Dunbar		55°58′52″N 2°32′10″W	Jacobean mansion by David Bryce, 1835	14756	Upload Photo
Bourhouse (Bower House) Dovecot	Bowerhouse, Dunbar		55°58′56″N 2°32′01″W	18th-century double lectern dovecot	14757	Upload another image
Halls Farmhouse	Halls, Spott, Dunbar		55°56′48″N 2°33′23″W	Late-18th-century farmhouse, remodelled in Romanesque style by Frederick Thomas Pilkington, 1860	14760	Upload Photo
Spott Dovecot	Spott House, Spott, Dunbar		55°58′20″N 2°31′20″W	18th-century double lectern dovecot	14763	Upload another image
Biel House	Stenton		55°58′29″N 2°35′19″W	Tudor-style country house incorporating medieval tower house	14764	Upload another image See more images
Stenton Rood Well	Stenton		55°57′41″N 2°36′15″W	16th-century wellhead	14783	Upload another image
Bielgrange Farmhouse	Biel, Stenton		55°58′19″N 2°36′47″W	Classical farmhouse by Charles Ritchie, 1803	14796	Upload Photo
Whittingehame House	Whittingehame		55°57′07″N 2°38′00″W	Greek-style neo-classical mansion by Sir Robert Smirke, 1817	17485	Upload another image
Whittingehame House, East Lodge with piers	Whittingehame		55°57′54″N 2°37′24″W	Greek classical lodge by William Burn, circa 1827	17486	Upload Photo
Whittingehame House, West Lodge with quadrants and gatepiers	Whittingehame		55°56′29″N 2°39′27″W	Greek classical lodge by Sir Robert Smirke, circa 1820	17490	Upload Photo
Whittingehame Tower	Whittingehame		55°57′02″N 2°38′19″W	Late-15th- to early-16th-century L-plan tower house	17500	Upload another image See more images
Whittingehame Tower, Pavilion Lodges and Gatepiers	Whittingehame		55°57′09″N 2°38′25″W	18th-century pair of Baroque gate lodges	17502	Upload another image See more images
Northfield House Dovecot	Preston		55°57′14″N 2°58′43″W	17th-century beehive dovecot	17528	Upload another image See more images
Hamilton House	Preston		55°57′18″N 2°58′44″W	Laird's house dated 1628	17529	Upload another image See more images
Prestongrange Colliery, Pump House and Pump	Prestongrange		55°57′07″N 3°00′18″W	Beam engine pump house and pump erected 1874 by Harvey and Company of Hoyle, Cornwall	17534	Upload another image See more images
Prestongrange House	Prestongrange		55°57′09″N 2°59′47″W	16th-century house remodelled by William Henry Playfair, 1830–1850	17537	Upload another image See more images
Dolphingstone Dovecot	Prestonpans		55°56′38″N 2°59′29″W	17th-century beehive dovecot	17553	Upload another image
Northfield House	Preston		55°57′16″N 2°58′47″W	Late-16th-century mansion with later additions	17560	Upload another image See more images
Morham Parish Church	Morham		55°56′40″N 2°42′41″W	18th-century parish church	18870	Upload another image See more images
East Saltoun Parish Church	East Saltoun		55°54′04″N 2°50′31″W	Gothic T-plan church by Robert Burn, 1805	18885	Upload another image See more images
Saltoun Hall	Saltoun		55°54′22″N 2°51′51″W	Tudor mansion by William Burn, 1825, incorporating 15th-century tower house	18895	Upload another image See more images
Saltoun Hall Stables, Carriage House and Cistern-Head	Saltoun		55°54′18″N 2°51′41″W	Late-18th-century classical stable block possibly by Robert Burn	18899	Upload Photo
Winton House, South Lodge Gates and Gatepiers	Pencaitland		55°54′42″N 2°53′23″W	Late-17th- or early-18th-century wrought-iron gates	18917	Upload Photo
Fountainhall or Penkaet Castle	Fountainhall, Pencaitland		55°53′57″N 2°55′07″W	17th-century laird's house	18918	Upload Photo
Pencaitland Parish Church	Pencaitland		55°54′39″N 2°53′32″W	Largely 17th-century church incorporating pre-Reformation nave	18933	Upload another image See more images
Wester Pencaitland Farm Dovecot	Pencaitland		55°54′37″N 2°53′49″W	17th-century lectern dovecot	18942	Upload another image
Winton House	Pencaitland		55°54′55″N 2°54′02″W	Anglo-Scottish Renaissance mansion, built 1620–1627 by William Wallace	18948	Upload another image See more images
Winton House, North Lodge with Gates	Pencaitland		55°55′12″N 2°54′21″W	Early-19th-century gate lodge	18950	Upload another image
Seton House	Port Seton		55°57′55″N 2°56′06″W	Castellated country house by Robert Adam, 1791	19080	Upload another image See more images
Cockenzie House	Cockenzie		55°58′13″N 2°57′48″W	17th-century house and warehouse with later alterations	23026	Upload another image See more images
Chalmers Memorial Church	Port Seton		55°58′13″N 2°57′27″W	Eclectic style church by Sydney Mitchell and Wilson, 1904	23027	Upload another image See more images
Belhaven Brewery (Maltings, Kilns, Vaults, Brewhouse, Boilerhouse, Chimney, Office, Former Stable and Mill)	Dunbar		55°59′50″N 2°32′16″W	18th-century brewery largely rebuilt in the 19th century	24730	Upload another image See more images
Courtyard through 71-75 High Street	Dunbar		56°00′07″N 2°30′55″W	17th- and 18th-century town houses	24788	Upload Photo
Dunbar Town House (Tolbooth)	Dunbar		56°00′08″N 2°30′56″W	17th-century municipal buildings	24790	Upload another image See more images
34 High Street	Dunbar		56°00′04″N 2°30′55″W	Late-18th-century L-plan town house	24802	Upload Photo
56-60 (even numbers) High Street	Dunbar		56°00′06″N 2°30′58″W	Tenement and shops dated 1743	24806	Upload Photo
Lauderdale House	Dunbar, High Street		56°00′13″N 2°31′03″W	18th-century house with extensions by Robert and James Adam	24829	Upload another image See more images
Queen's Road Parish Church	Dunbar		55°59′57″N 2°30′42″W	Gothic Revival church by James Gillespie Graham, 1821	24842	Upload another image See more images
Old Tyne Bridge	East Linton, over the River Tyne		55°59′07″N 2°39′16″W	Mid-to-late-16th-century two-arch road bridge	26632	Upload another image See more images
Haddington Town Hall	Haddington		55°57′20″N 2°46′43″W	Town hall by William Adam, 1748, altered by James Gillespie Graham, 1830	34185	Upload another image See more images
Carlyle House	Haddington, High Street		55°57′19″N 2°46′42″W	Mid 18th-century classical house	34239	Upload Photo
Bank of Scotland	Haddington, 44 Court Street		55°57′21″N 2°46′54″W	Classical mansion of 1803	34281	Upload another image
26, 27 Market Street	Haddington		55°57′21″N 2°46′39″W	17th-century town house and shops	34303	Upload Photo
24, 25 Market Street	Haddington		55°57′21″N 2°46′38″W	17th-century town house and shops	34306	Upload Photo
7, 8 Market Street	Haddington		55°57′22″N 2°46′33″W	18th-century classical town house	34315	Upload Photo
Haddington House	Haddington, Sidegate Street		55°57′15″N 2°46′28″W	17th-century town house	34388	Upload another image
St Mary's Parish Church	Haddington		55°57′12″N 2°46′19″W	Late-14th- to late-15th-century church	34391	Upload another image See more images
Nungate Bridge	Haddington, Bridge Street		55°57′17″N 2°46′18″W	16th-century three-arch stone bridge	34414	Upload another image See more images
Musselburgh Town House	Musselburgh, High Street		55°56′35″N 3°02′56″W	18th-century town hall renovated in the 19th century	38308	Upload another image
Musselburgh Tolbooth	Musselburgh, High Street		55°56′35″N 3°02′56″W	16th-century tolbooth with tower dated 1496	38309	Upload another image See more images
Pinkie House	Musselburgh		55°56′33″N 3°02′39″W	Later 16th-century L-plan house with large 17th-century extension and later alterations	38314	Upload another image See more images
Old Bridge	Musselburgh		55°56′29″N 3°03′25″W	Early-16th-century three-arch bridge	38378	Upload another image See more images
The Grange	North Berwick, Grange Road		56°03′13″N 2°43′28″W	Late-19th-century house combining Scottish Renaissance and Arts and Crafts detail, by Robert Lorimer	38723	Upload Photo
Norham	North Berwick, Marmion Road		56°03′25″N 2°43′30″W	English cottage style house, 1895, by Thomas Duncan Rhind	38756	Upload Photo
Prestongrange Church	Prestongrange		55°57′36″N 2°58′53″W	16th-century church, rebuilt in 1774	40320	Upload another image See more images
Harlaw Hill House	Prestonpans		55°57′39″N 2°58′47″W	17th-century house with 18th-century stables	40322	Upload another image
Lennoxlove House, Garden Gateway	Haddington		55°56′20″N 2°46′39″W	Gates by Robert Lorimer, 1912, leading to formal gardens	43548	Upload Photo
Ugston Old Farm	Ugston, Haddington		55°57′46″N 2°48′48″W	Late-16th-century farm steading	43560	Upload Photo

== See also ==
- Scheduled monuments in East Lothian
