= Scheduled monuments in East Lothian =

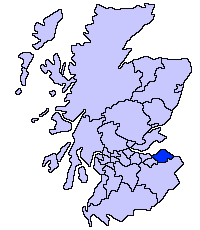
East Lothian shown within Scotland

A scheduled monument in Scotland is a nationally important archaeological site or monument which is given legal protection by being placed on a list (or "schedule") maintained by Historic Environment Scotland. The aim of scheduling is to preserve the country's most significant sites and monuments as far as possible in the form in which they have been inherited.

The process of scheduling is governed by the Ancient Monuments and Archaeological Areas Act 1979, which aims "to make provision for the investigation, preservation and recording of matters of archaeological or historical interest". The term "scheduled monument" can apply to the whole range of archaeological sites which have been deliberately constructed by human activity but are not always visible above ground. They range from prehistoric standing stones and burial sites, through Roman remains and medieval structures such as castles and monasteries, to later structures such as industrial sites and buildings constructed for the World Wars. Some buildings or structures which were both scheduled and listed have had their listing designations removed to reduce the duplication.

In 2017 there were 8238 scheduled monuments in Scotland.

== Notable Scheduled Monuments in East Lothian ==
Name	Location	Description	Ref No	Image
Black Castle	Garvald	Iron Age hillfort	SM745	
White Castle Fort	Garvald	Iron Age hill fort	SM756	
Keith Marischal Kirk and Dovecot	Humbie	Ruined chapel of early Norman Gothic style and dovecot	SM758	
Barnes Castle	Haddington	Remains of fortified grange	SM764	
Bass Castle	Bass Rock	Ruined castle	SM765	
Red Friar's Monastery Dovecot	Dunbar	15th-century former bell tower	SM767	
Preston Tower and dovecot	Prestonpans	Late medieval towerhouse and dovecot	SM774	
Redhouse Castle	Aberlady	Ruined 16th-century fortified tower-house	SM775	
Saltcoats Castle	Dirleton	16th-century courtyard castle	SM776	
Gamelshiel Castle	Stenton	Remains of small 16th century towerhouse	SM5606	
Garleton Castle	Athelstaneford	Ruined 16th-century castle	SM6049	
Tantallon Castle	North Berwick	Ruined 14th-century towers	SM13326	
Hailes Castle	Prestonkirk	Ruined 13th-century castle	SM13330	
Chesters Hill Fort	Drem, Athelstaneford	Multivallate fort of later prehistoric date	SM90072	
Dirleton Castle, dovecot and gardens	Dirleton	Ruined castle	SM90096	
Preston Market Cross	Prestonpans	Mercat	SM90242	
St Martin's Kirk	Haddington	Ruined medieval church	SM90159	

== See also ==
- List of Category A listed buildings in East Lothian
