= Georgian House =

Georgian House may refer to:

- Georgian House, Bristol
- The Georgian House, Edinburgh
- The Georgian House, British children's television series

== See also ==
- Georgian architecture
- Architecture of Georgia (country)
