= Schomberg Scott =

Scottish architect

Walter Schomberg Hepburn Scott (1910–1998) was a Scottish architect specialising in building restoration. From 1950 to 1975, he did multiple projects for the National Trust of Scotland.

== Life ==
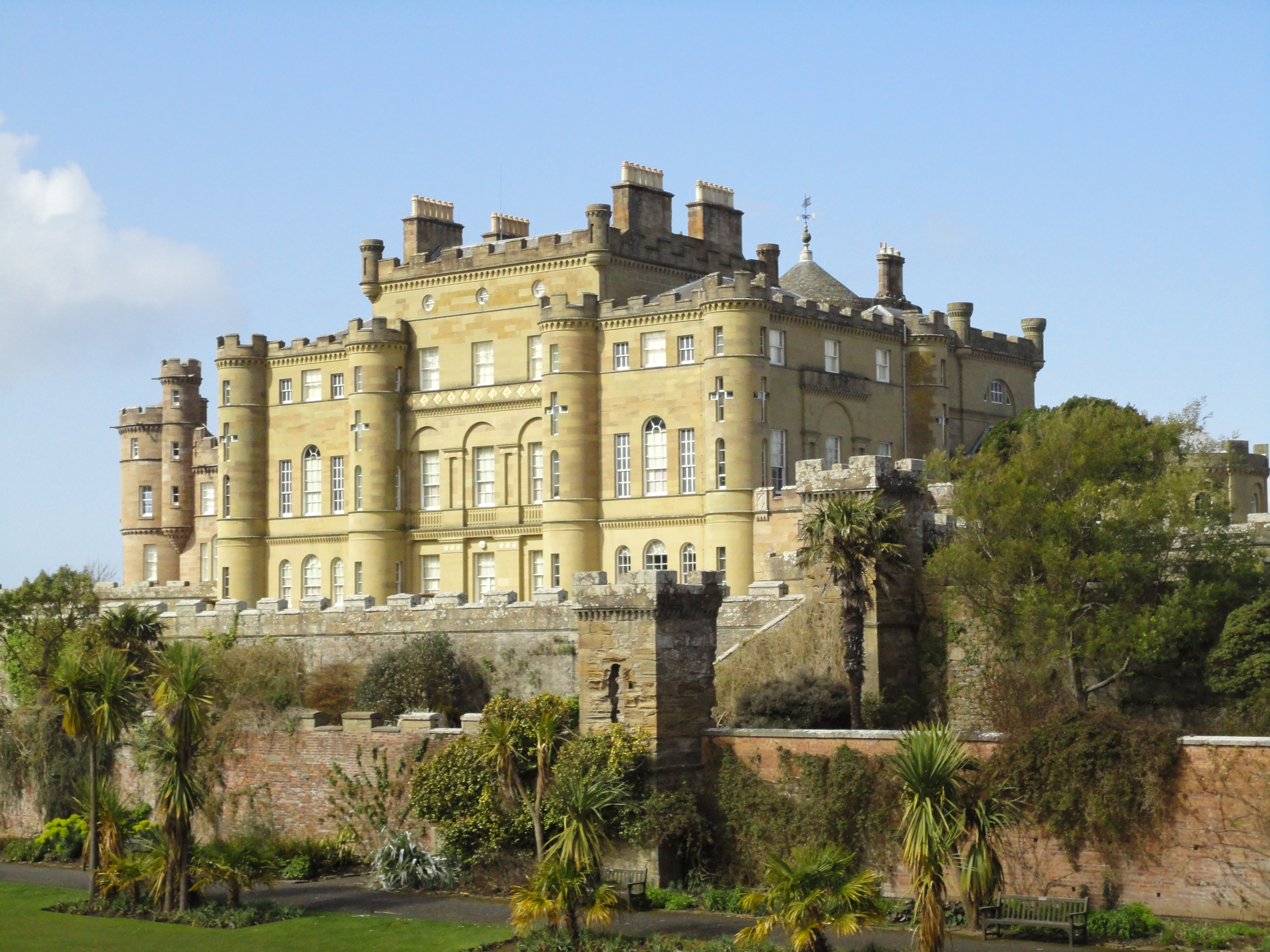
Culzean Castle

He was born on 14 September 1910 at Monteviot House in the Scottish Borders near the estate of Floors Castle, where his father, James Corpatrick Hepburn Scott, was Chamberlain to the 8th and 9th Duke of Roxburghe. His father was second son of Lord Polwarth and his mother Isobel Alice Adelaide Kerr was the daughter of the 7th Marquess of Lothian. Whilst not titled in his own right, Schomberg Scott was steeped both in aristocratic life and the country houses of Scotland from birth.

He was privately educated at Radley College then returned to Scotland to study architecture at Edinburgh College of Art. In 1934/5, he then went to work under Edinburgh architect Reginald Fairlie at 7 Ainslie Place. In 1935/6, he did an extensive tour of Europe to study architecture. On return he obtained a position in London working for the architect Darcy Braddell.

In 1937, he returned to Edinburgh to work for Orphoot, Whiting and Lindsay, but living some distance away at Broomlands House in Kelso. After a short period back in London working with Edward Maufe.

During the Second World War he served as a captain in the Royal Engineers in India, there designing a chapel in Simla. After the war he became associated with the National Trust for Scotland, his first major project being at Culzean Castle. The Trust had been formed in 1931 but had been relatively stagnant during the Second World War due to lack of finance.

Around 1950, he set up his own office in Edinburgh's West End and in 1952 became a partner in the firm of Ian Lindsay & Partners. However his interests in the National Trust were too dominant and he left around 1954. In the same year, he purchased Northfield House, located near Prestonpans in East Lothian, through contacts at the National Trust and restored it as is own home.

He retired in 1975, after his restoration of Robert Adam's Georgian House for the National Trust on Charlotte Square in Edinburgh.

Scott died in the Victoria Manor Nursing Home in Edinburgh on 11 February 1998.

== Restoration projects ==
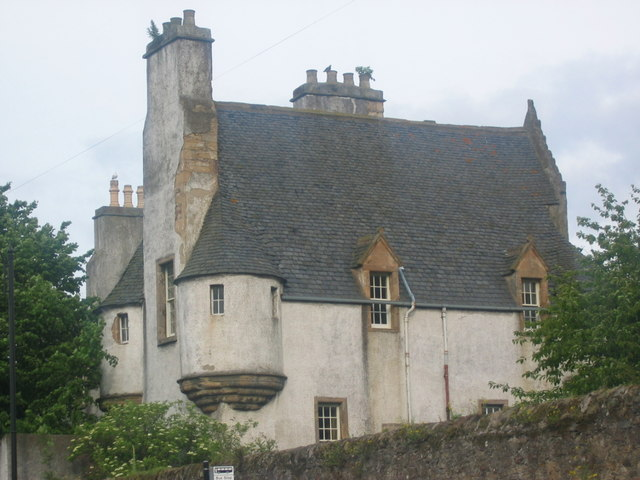
Northfield House, Preston village, East Lothian

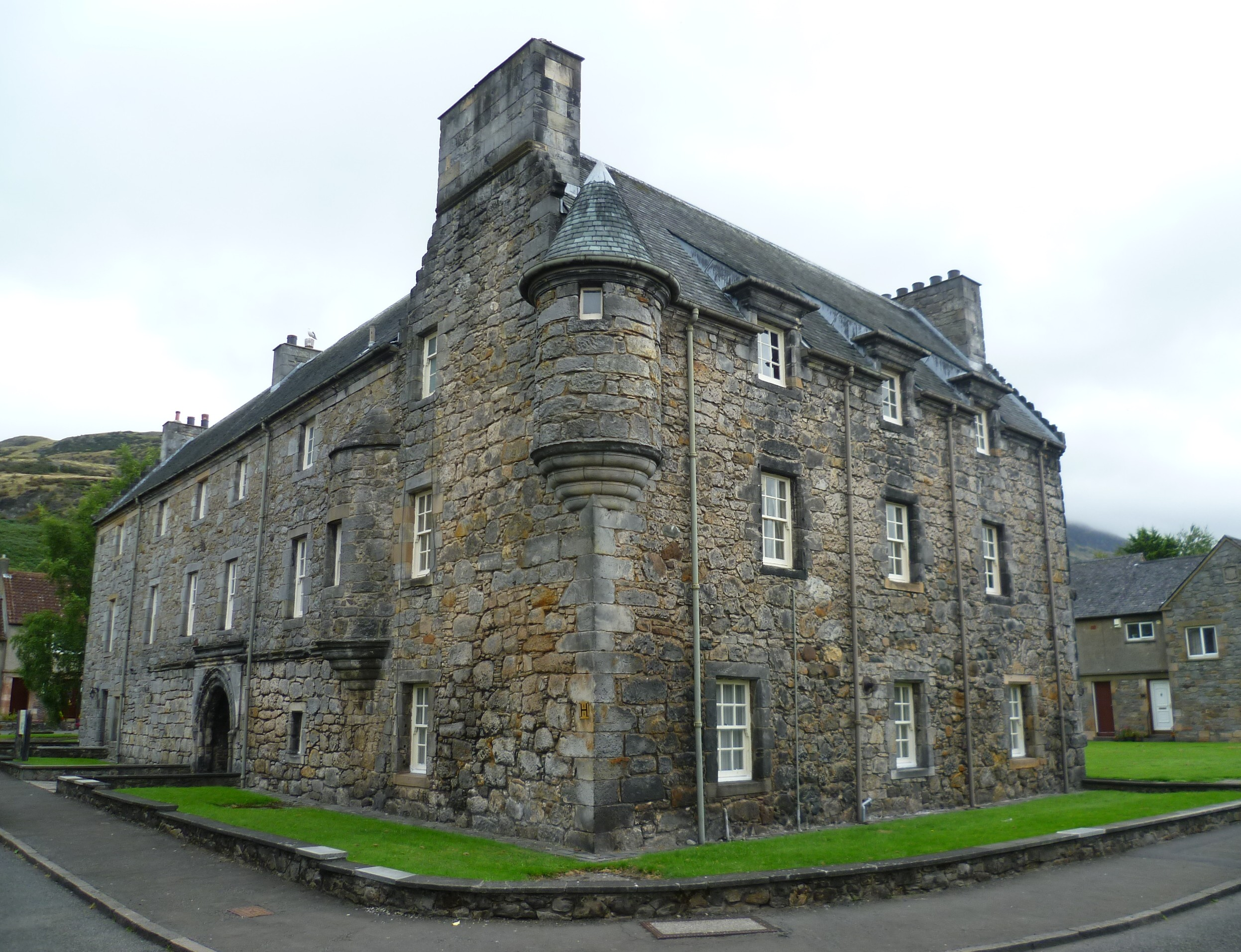
Menstrie Castle

- Mellerstain House
- Abbotsford House
- Drumlanrig Castle
- Monzie Castle
- Winton House
- Hamilton House, East Lothian (c.1938)
- Lennoxlove House
- Stobo Castle
- Cleish Castle
- Pilmuir House
- Balmuto
- Culzean Castle for NTS (1946–1950)
- Northfield House (1954)
- Airlie Castle (1956)
- Falkland Palace (1956) for NTS
- Elshieshields Tower (1957) - extension
- Gordon Castle (1960)
- Menstrie Castle (1961) restoration and conversion to flats
- Insch Parish Church (1963)
- Inverewe Garden visitor centre (1963)
- Falkland Palace visitor centre (1963)
- Crathes Castle new wing after fire and visitor centre (1967)
- House of Pitmuies (1968) including conservatory
- Pan Ha's housing, Kirkcaldy (1968)
- Haddington House (1969) rebuilding as a collegiate centre
- Pitmedden House in Pitmedden, Aberdeenshire (1972)
- Dalkeith Palace (1973)
- The Georgian House, 7 Charlotte Square (1975)

== New build projects ==
- Chapel in Simla (1944)
- Dupplin House (1970–76)
- Monteviot House (1961–63)
- Membland, Haddington (1966)
- Gannochy Lodge, Edzell (1973)
- St Matthew's Church, Barrow-in-Furness (1967)

== Publications ==
- Culzean Castle (1975)
- Let's Look at Scottish Castles and Houses
- Crathes Castle
- Leith Hall in the Heritage of Scotland

== Family ==
In February 1945 he married Deborah Howard a descendent of the Howards of Castle Howard. He had proposed by telegram from Suez during the war.
