= Preston, Prestonpans =

Coordinates: 55.955°N 2.979°W

Preston
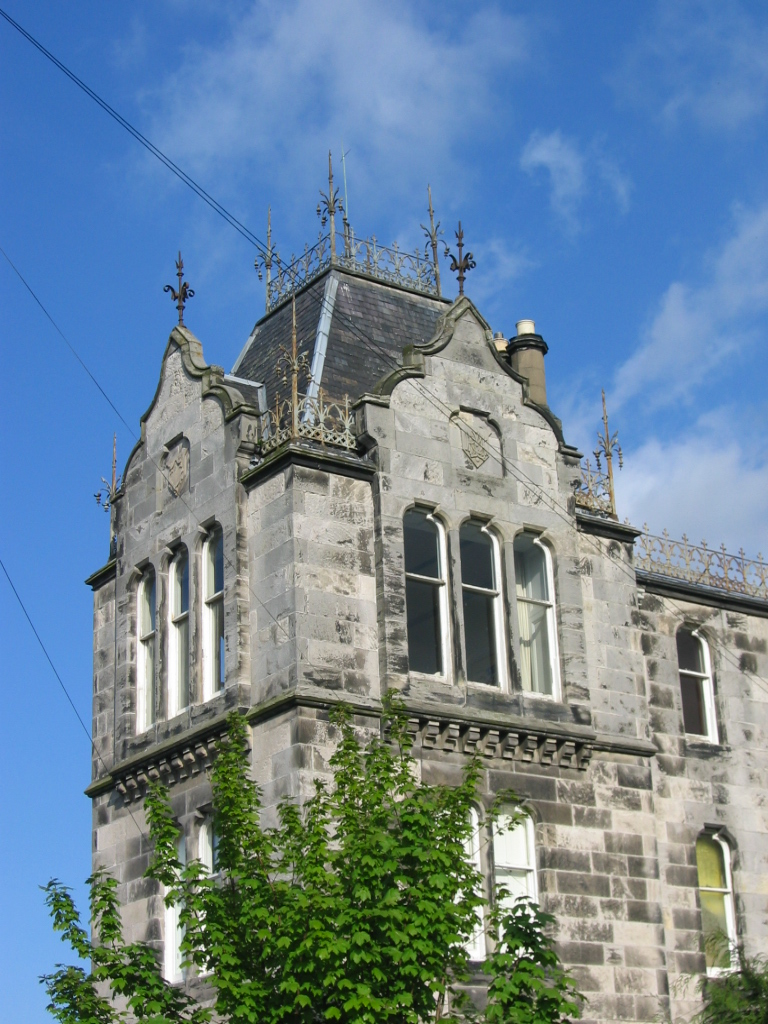
- Preston Lodge

- Location within Scotland
- OS grid reference: NT388739
- Civil parish: Prestonpans
- Council area: East Lothian Council
- Lieutenancy area: East Lothian
- Country: Scotland
- Sovereign state: United Kingdom
- Post town: PRESTONPANS
- Postcode district: EH32
- Dialling code: 01875
- Police: Scotland
- Fire: Scottish
- Ambulance: Scottish
- UK Parliament: East Lothian
- Scottish Parliament: East Lothian

Preston was a village on the East Lothian coast of Scotland, and is now a small part of the centre of Prestonpans. It is to the east of Prestongrange, and the southwest of Cockenzie and Port Seton.

The name Preston means "priest town", and the monks of Holyrood Abbey and Newbattle Abbey owned land there. The village was noted for St Jerome's Fair, held on the second Thursday of October. The chapmen of the area had formed themselves into a guild and elected their office bearers at the fair.

Two of Preston's most important structures were Preston Tower and Preston mercat cross. The mercat cross which dates from 1617, is unique both in its integrity and in that it is the only such structure in Scotland still in its original location and form. It has eight compartments, two doorways, six alcoves with semi-circular mouldings of scallop shells. The latter are said to be an allusion to the pilgrim traffic between North Berwick and St Andrews.

Preston Tower belonged to the Hamilton family (also known as the "haughty Hamiltons") who owned ten strongholds including Preston House, Hamilton House, Innerwick Castle and Brodick Castle, Arran.

Other notable buildings on the site of the former village of Preston include Northfield House and Preston Lodge, pictured on the right.

== See also ==
- List of places in East Lothian
- Morrison's Haven
- Prestongrange Industrial Heritage Museum
- Prestongrange House
- Barony of Preston and Prestonpans

== Photo gallery ==
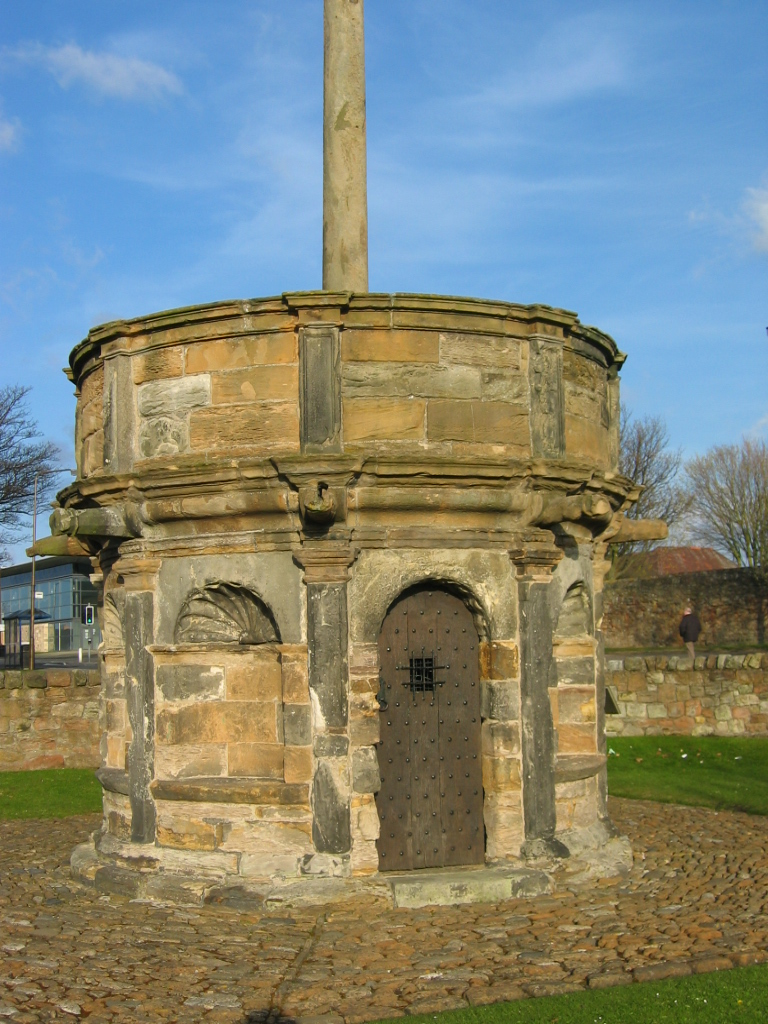

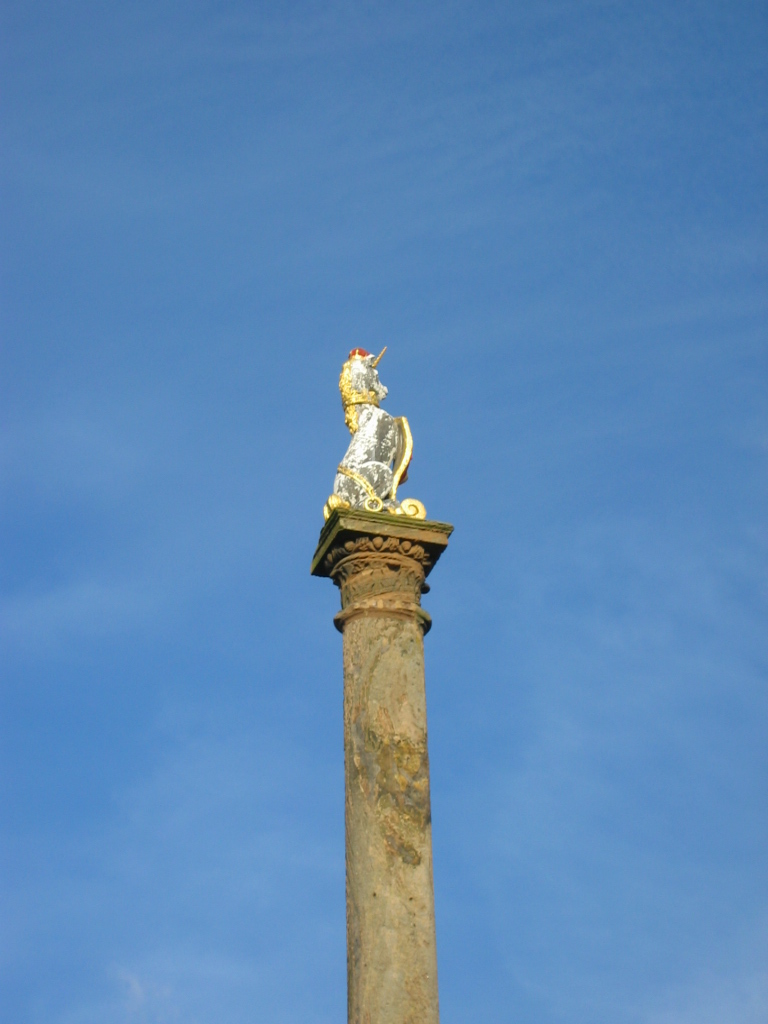

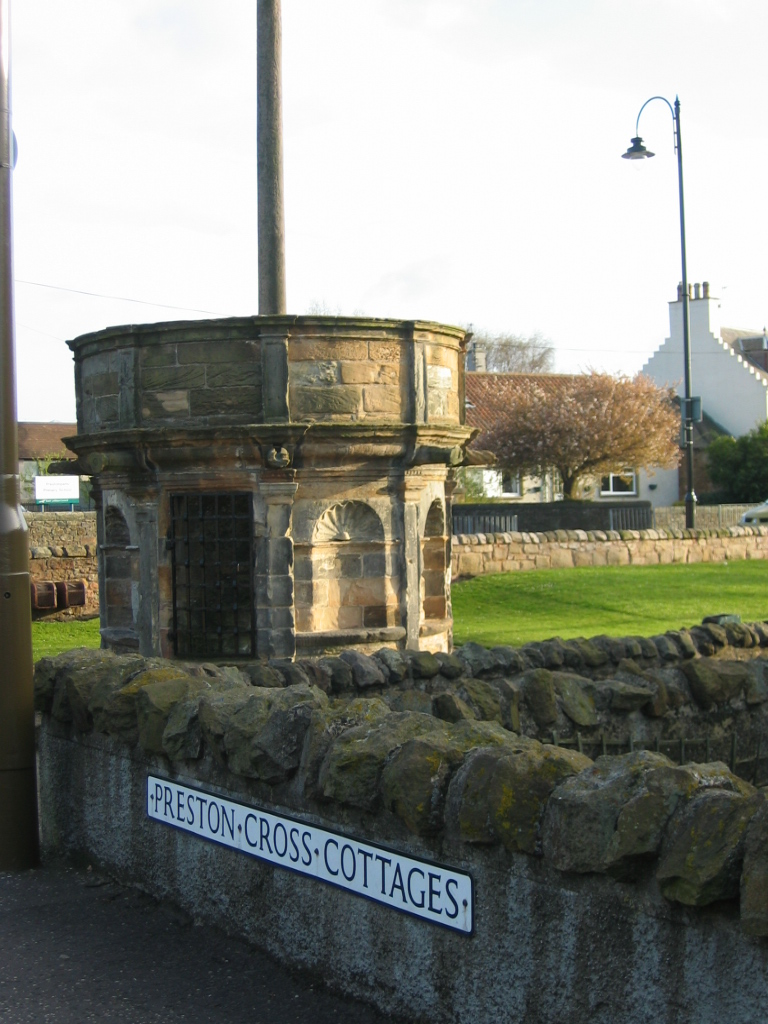

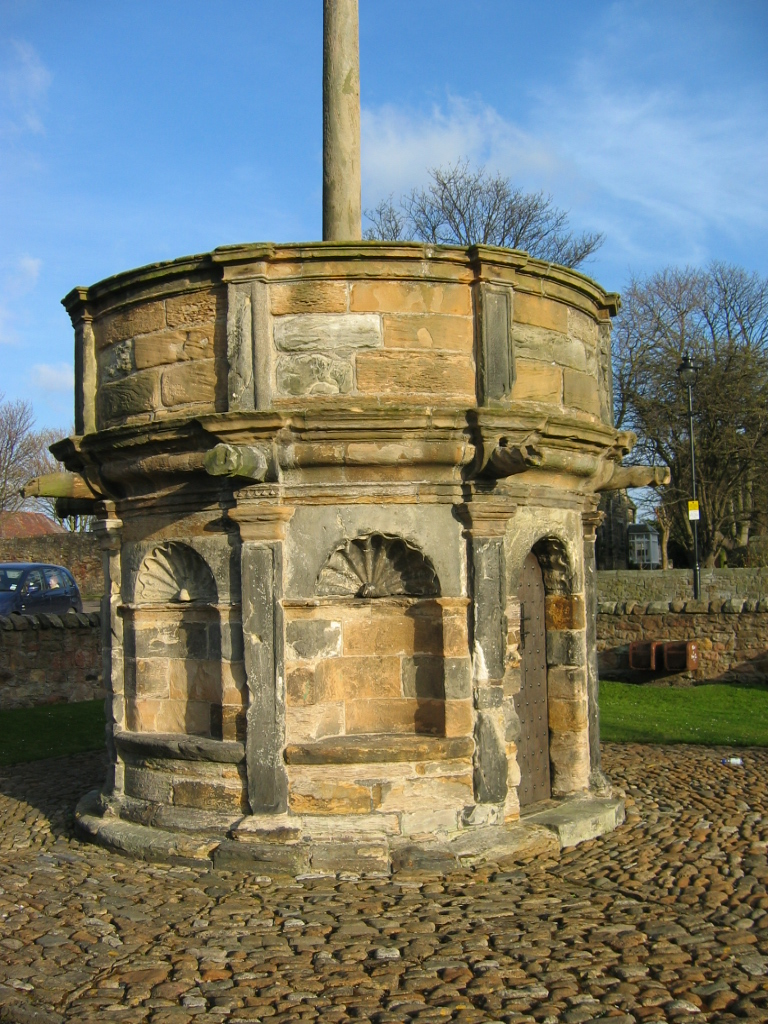
