= Prestongrange Parish Church =

Church in East Lothian, Scotland

Coordinates: 55°57′37″N 2°58′53″W

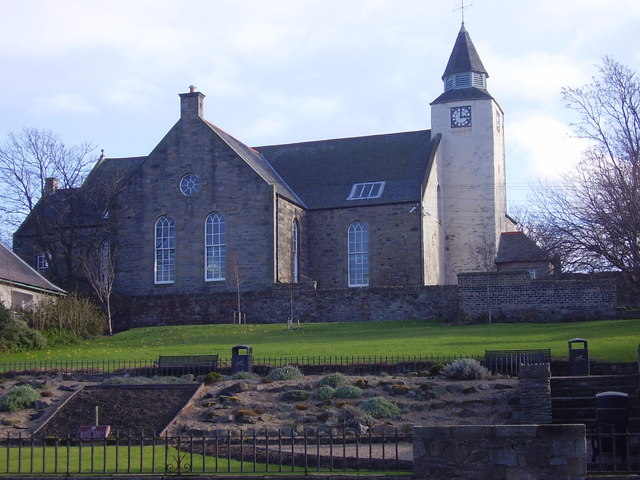
Prestongrange Parish Church

Prestongrange Parish Church is a Church of Scotland kirk situated in the former mining town of Prestonpans in East Lothian. Constructed in 1596, it is one of the first churches built in Scotland following the Scottish Reformation of 1560. In 1606, Prestonpans was created a parish in its own right, after centuries as part of the parish of Tranent.

A church had existed south of Prestonpans since the 12th century, administered by the canons of Holyrude Abbey. However, that church, near Northfield House, was destroyed in 1544 by the earl of Hertford during the Rough Wooing campaign against the Scots after their refusal to allow Princess Mary of Scotland (later Mary, Queen of Scots) to marry Henry's son, Prince Edward.

== Notable ministers ==
John Davidson, formerly of Liberton in Edinburgh was appointed first minister at the new church and financed its construction. The land was gifted by the Hamilton family, the lairds of Preston. Rev. Davidson was known for his outspokenness, unafraid to criticize bishops or even King James VI of Scots. He was imprisoned in Edinburgh in 1601 and, upon release, was banned from leaving the parish for life. Since 1596, the church has been served by 27 ministers. William Carlyle, father of Jupiter Carlyle, was minister at the time of the Battle of Prestonpans on September 21, 1745, and wrote an account of the battle after witnessing it from the church tower. William Bruce Cunningham was minister during the church split in 1843. Rev. J. Struthers served as minister for 45 years around the turn of the 20th century. Moira Herkes became the first female minister at Prestonpans upon her arrival in 1988.

== Changes ==
The church was extensively refurbished in 1774 and again in 1891, resulting in the building seen today. Only the clock tower and some surrounding masonry remain from the original 1596 church; the outline of the original west gable end is still visible inside the roof.

A major rift occurred within the Church of Scotland in 1843, leading many congregants to leave Preston Church, as it was then known. Led by the incumbent minister William Bruce Cunningham, the dissenting members eventually built their own church, the Free Church of Scotland, later the United Free Church, in West Loan, a few hundred yards from Preston Kirk. When the Church of Scotland and the United Free Church reunited in 1929, the former United Free Church congregation adopted the name Grange Church. In 1981, the two congregations reunited to form Prestongrange Parish Church.

The kirkyard contains many notable gravestones, including those of former ministers and soldiers from the Battle of Prestonpans.

== References and further reading ==
- Prestonpans and Vicinity. Historical, Ecclesiastical and Traditional - Peter McNeill *
- New Statistical Accounts for Scotland - 1799 - 1835 *
- Prestongrange Parish Church Website *
- Prestonpans - University Press - Tales of the Pans/Prestongrange Church *
- The Buildings of Scotland - Lothian except Edinburgh - Colin McWilliam - 1978 *
