= List of collegiate churches in Scotland =

Bothwell Parish is the only Collegiate church where worship is still held. It is thought that the first Collegium of canons with its own chapel was formed in St. Andrews in the 13th century, and it is thought that by the Reformation there were more than 50 secular religious houses. The proscription of the Catholic faith in 1567 meant that these houses had to close. Although Scotland endured the Iconoclasm of the Reformation, there are still some handsome structures extant. Some Collegiate churches were converted into local parish Kirks, whilst others have fallen to ruin, some a mixture of the two.

As a response to the power of medieval monastiscm, the rulers of Scotland—in common with many other Northern European states—tried to control the power of the church by encouraging local magnates to commission secular houses of worship within their lands and often within their own fortalices.

These churches were often considered as private fiefdoms within certain families as a means to ensure prayers for their souls and for the glory and immortality of their lines. Establishing previous monastic establishments as Collegia of Canons helped to "temporalise" authority over large areas of valuable land and increase the power of the crown.

== Aberdeen ==
- Saint Nicholas Collegiate Church

== Ayrshire ==
- Kilmaurs Collegiate Church
- Maybole Collegiate Church
- The Cathedral of The Isles on Great Cumbrae, one of the two cathedrals of the Diocese of Argyll and the Isles, opened in 1851 as a collegiate church.

== Dumfries & Galloway ==
- Lincluden Collegiate Church

== East Lothian ==
- Dunbar Collegiate Church
- Dunglass Collegiate Church, East Lothian
- Seton Collegiate Church
- St. Mary's Collegiate Church, Haddington
- Yester Chapel/St. Cuthbert's Collegiate Church

== Edinburgh ==
- Corstorphine Collegiate Church
- Restalrig Collegiate Church
- St. Giles Collegiate Church, Edinburgh
- Trinity Collegiate Church and Hospital, Edinburgh

== Fife ==
- Saint Salvator's Collegiate Chapel, St Andrews
- Strathmiglo Collegiate Church

== Glasgow ==
- Glasgow Collegiate Church

== Highland ==
- Dornoch Collegiate Church
- The Collegiate Church of St Duthac in Tain

== Midlothian ==
- Crichton Collegiate Church
- Dalkeith Collegiate Church
- Collegiate Chapel of St. Matthew, Roslin

== Moray ==
- Elgin Collegiate Church

== Perth and Kinross ==
- Abernethy Collegiate Church
- Dunblane Collegiate Church
- Innerpeffray Collegiate Church
- Methven Collegiate Church

== Scottish Borders ==
- Peebles Collegiate Church

== Stirling ==
- Stirling Collegiate Church

== West Dunbartonshire ==
- St Mary's Collegiate Church, Dumbarton

To be sorted:

- Semple Collegiate Church
- Easter Fowlis Collegiate Church
- Saint Nicholas Collegiate Church, Saint Andrews
- Brechin Collegiate Church
- Guthrie Collegiate Church
- Dunkeld Collegiate Church
- Fortrose Collegiate Church
- Tain Collegiate Church
- Lismore Collegiate Church
- Kilmun Collegiate Church
