= Dumbarton Collegiate Church =

- Collegiate Church of St Mary
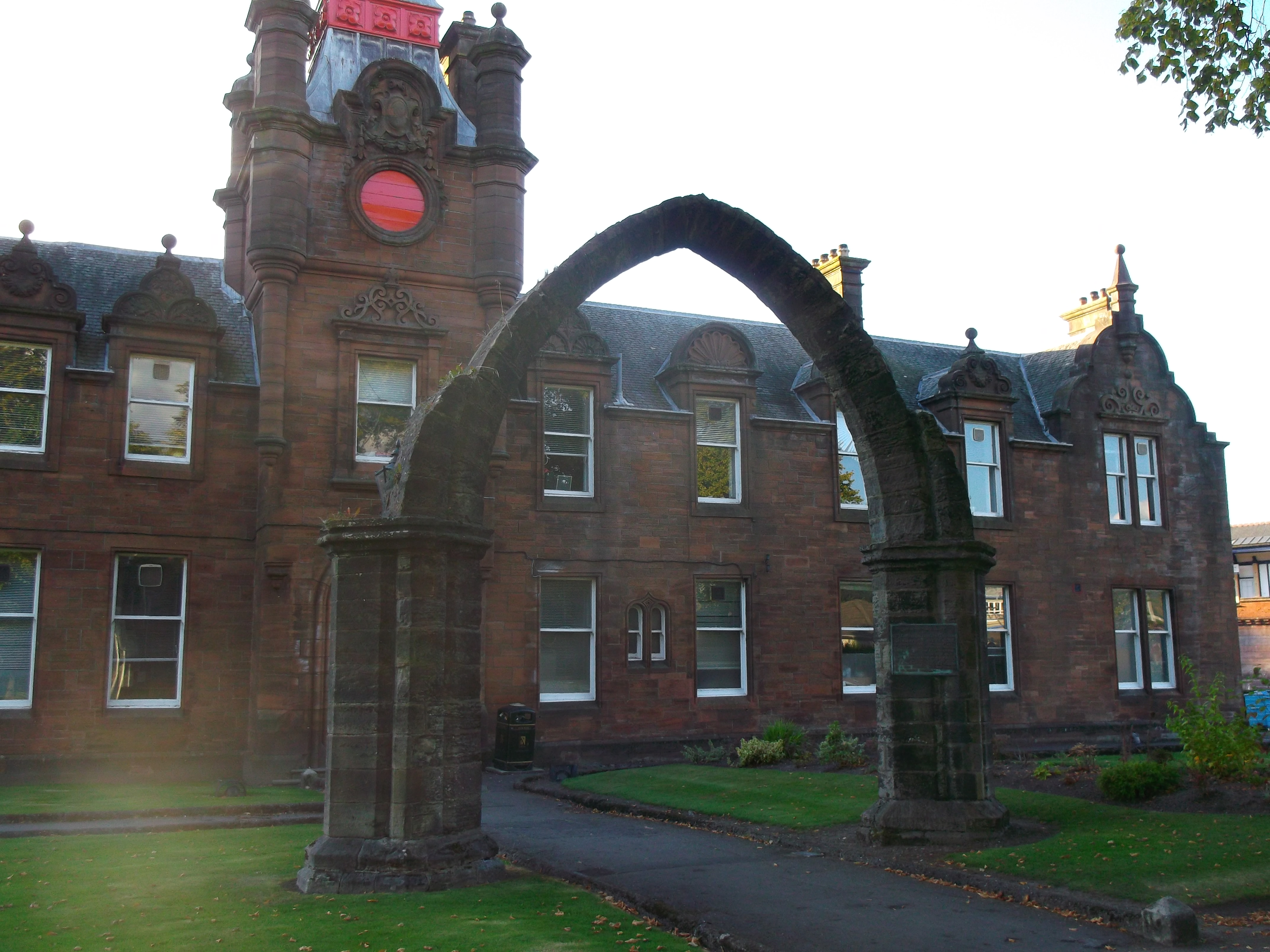
- One of the Tower Arches of St Mary's Collegiate Church Dumbarton
- Dumbarton Collegiate Church
- 55°9′47″N 4°56′7″W
- Location: Dumbarton
- Country: Scotland

History
- Founded: 1453
- Founder(s): Isabella, Countess of Lennox and Duchess of Albany

The Collegiate Church of St Mary, Dumbarton, Scotland, was founded in about 1453 by Isabella, Countess of Lennox and Duchess of Albany. During the medieval period, collegiate churches took on the responsibility of caring for the sick and elderly within their parishes. St Mary's met these needs in a hospital attached to the main church building, and a separate leper house located at a "safe" distance from the town centre. The church ceased to exist at some time during the Scottish Reformation of the mid-sixteenth century.

The site of the collegiate church is now occupied by Dumbarton Central railway station. All that remains of the once extensive building is one of the tower arches. The stone arch was removed in 1850 to a site in Church Street, Dumbarton, and moved again in 1907 to its present location in the grounds of the town's registry office, beside the railway station.

== See also ==
- List of Collegiate churches in Scotland
