= Bass Castle =

Castle in North Berwick

- Bass Rock, North Berwick in Scotland
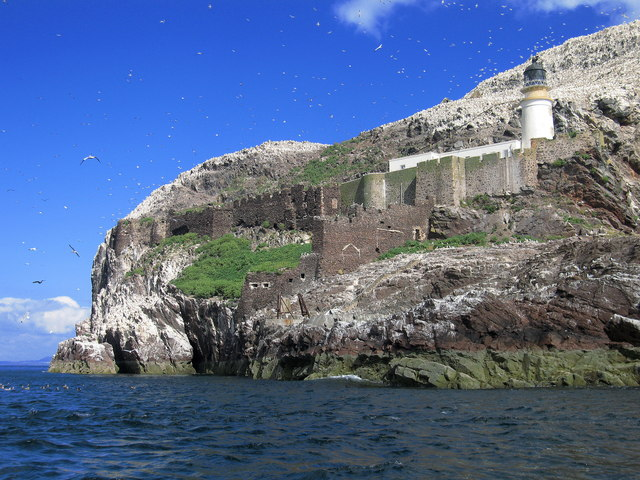
- Bass Castle walls next to the lighthouse

Location
- Coordinates: 56.0766°N 2.6417°W

Scheduled monument
- Official name: Bass Castle
- Type: Secular: castle
- Designated: 17 January 1950
- Reference no.: SM765

Bass Castle is a castle on Bass Rock located off the coast of North Berwick, Scotland.

== History ==
The current structure dates back to the sixteenth century. However, a castle on the Bass rock has been referred to as early as 1405, when the castle was said to have been a temporary refuge for Prince James from the Duke of Albany. The oldest building was thought to a hermitage built by Baldred of Tyninghame, and the chapel is known to have been consecrated in 1542 by David Beaton.

The castle was described by the French soldier Jean de Beaugué who visited during the war now known as the Rough Wooing. He wrote that the garrison of 120 subsisted on fish dropped by sea birds. The castle and island were owned by the Lauders of Bass in the sixteenth century until 1671, when it was sold to the Crown until 1706, when it was finally passed on to Sir Hew Dalrymple of North Berwick. The Lauder family are said to have owned Bass Rock since 1318.

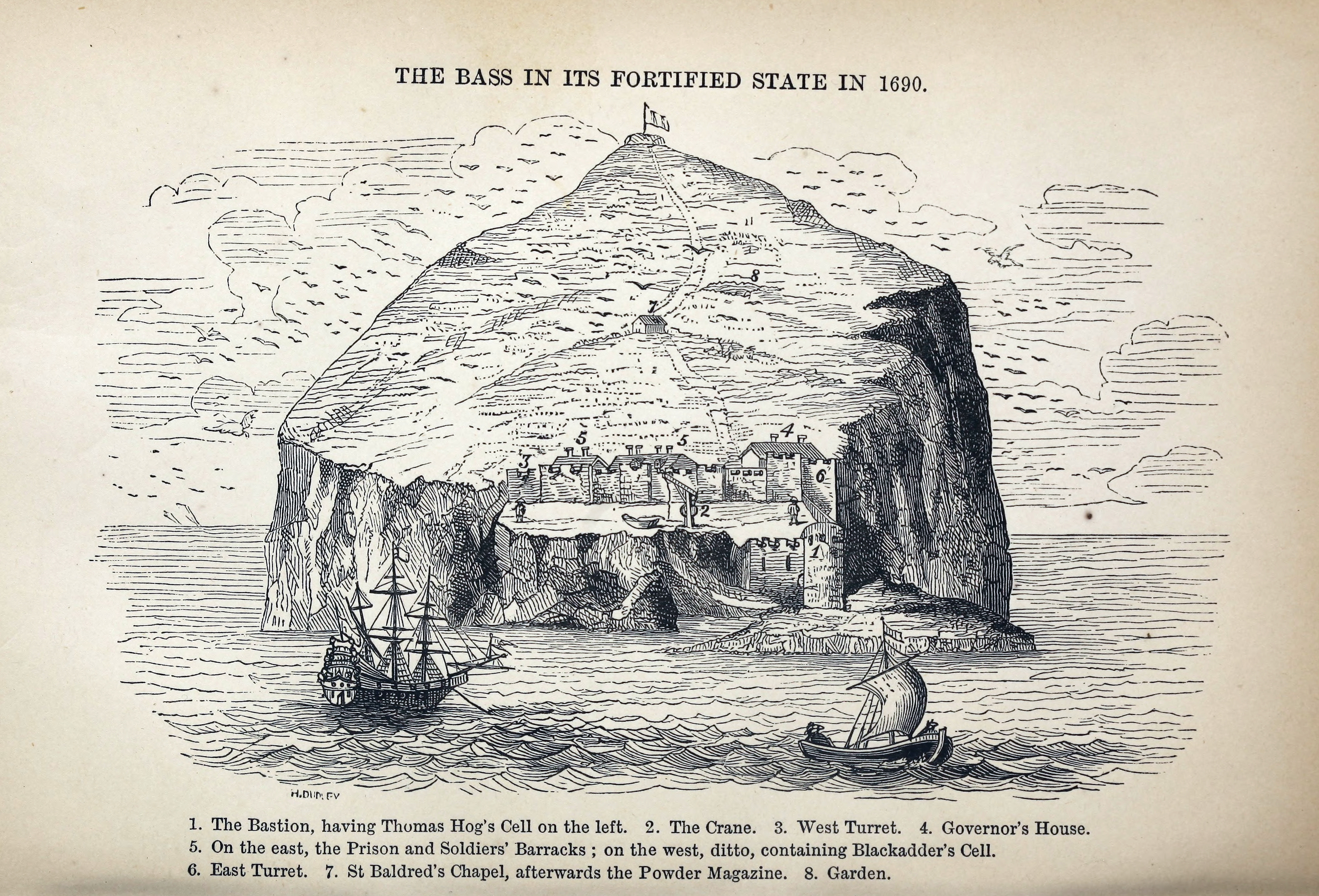
Drawing of Bass Castle when it was fortified.

In the mid-late seventeenth century, the island and a small room in the castle were used as a prison. From 1701, Bass Rock was no longer used as a prison and it is said that the castle was partially demolished in the same year.

=== Royal history ===
The castle has been visited by many historic figures including James VI in 1581. He offered to buy the island from George Lauder, but his offer was declined.

=== Modern history ===
The castle is currently a ruin, with only some of the original walls remaining. A lighthouse was built on top of it in 1902.
