= The Georgian House, Edinburgh =

National trust house in Edinburgh

Coordinates: 55°57′09″N 3°12′29″W

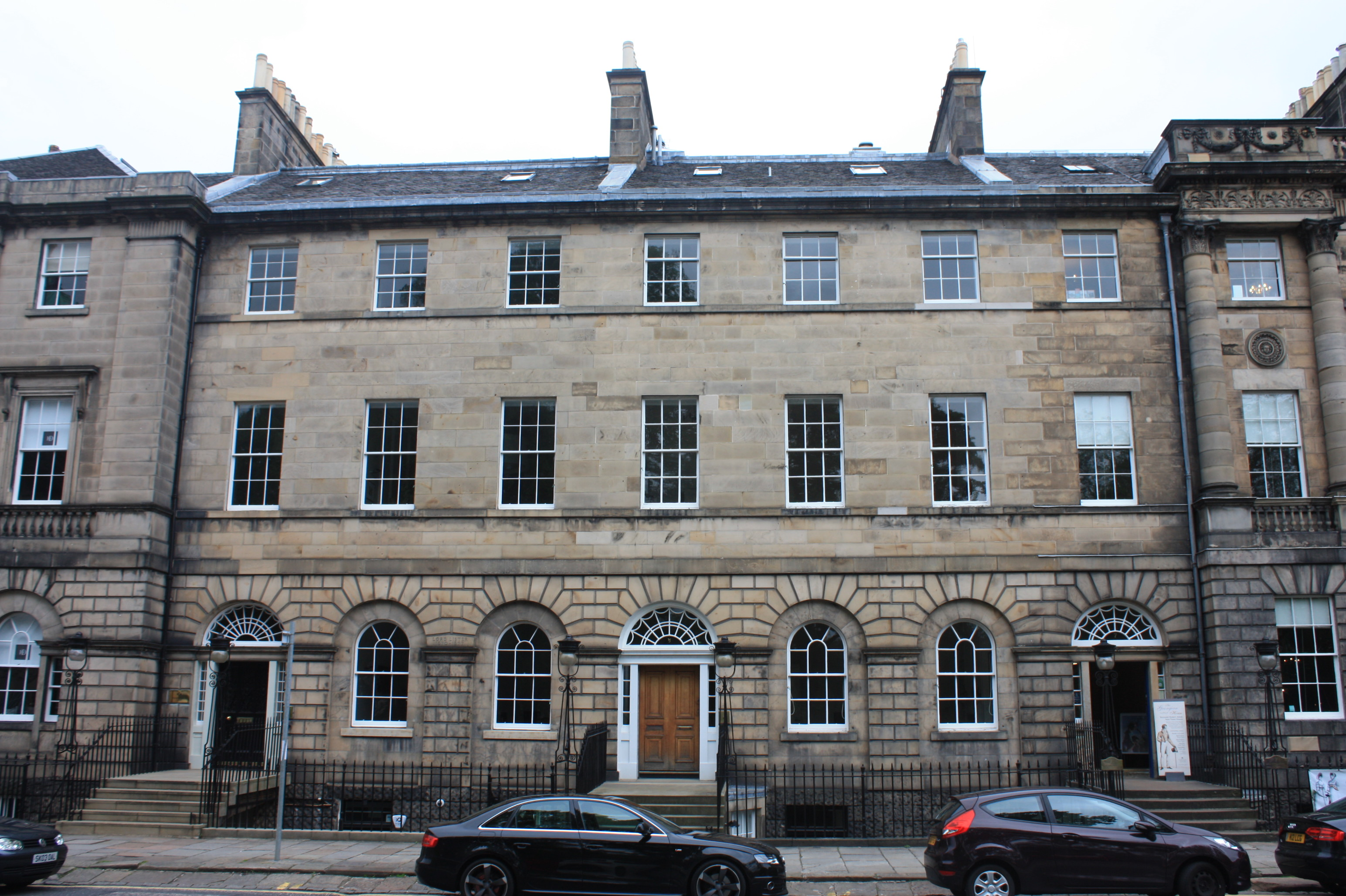
- Website: https://www.visitscotland.com/info/see-do/the-georgian-house-p246361

The Georgian House is an 18th-century townhouse situated at No. 7 Charlotte Square in the heart of the historic New Town of the city of Edinburgh, Scotland. It has been restored and furnished by the National Trust for Scotland, and is operated as a popular tourist attraction, with over 40,000 visitors annually.

== The New Town and Charlotte Square ==
In 1766 a young unknown architect named James Craig won the competition to design a layout for Edinburgh's first New Town. By this time in the mid-18th century Edinburgh had become extremely overcrowded and the rich and poor alike were living in very close quarters in cramped conditions in the tenements of the medieval Old Town. The New Town was to be constructed to the north of the Old Town, and the intention was that it would remain a strictly residential development, a privileged enclave for the wealthy away from the squalor found in the Old Town. Today visitors can experience what life was like in the Old Town by visiting Gladstone's Land on the Royal Mile, which is a restored tenement building set up as the dwelling of a 17th-century merchant.

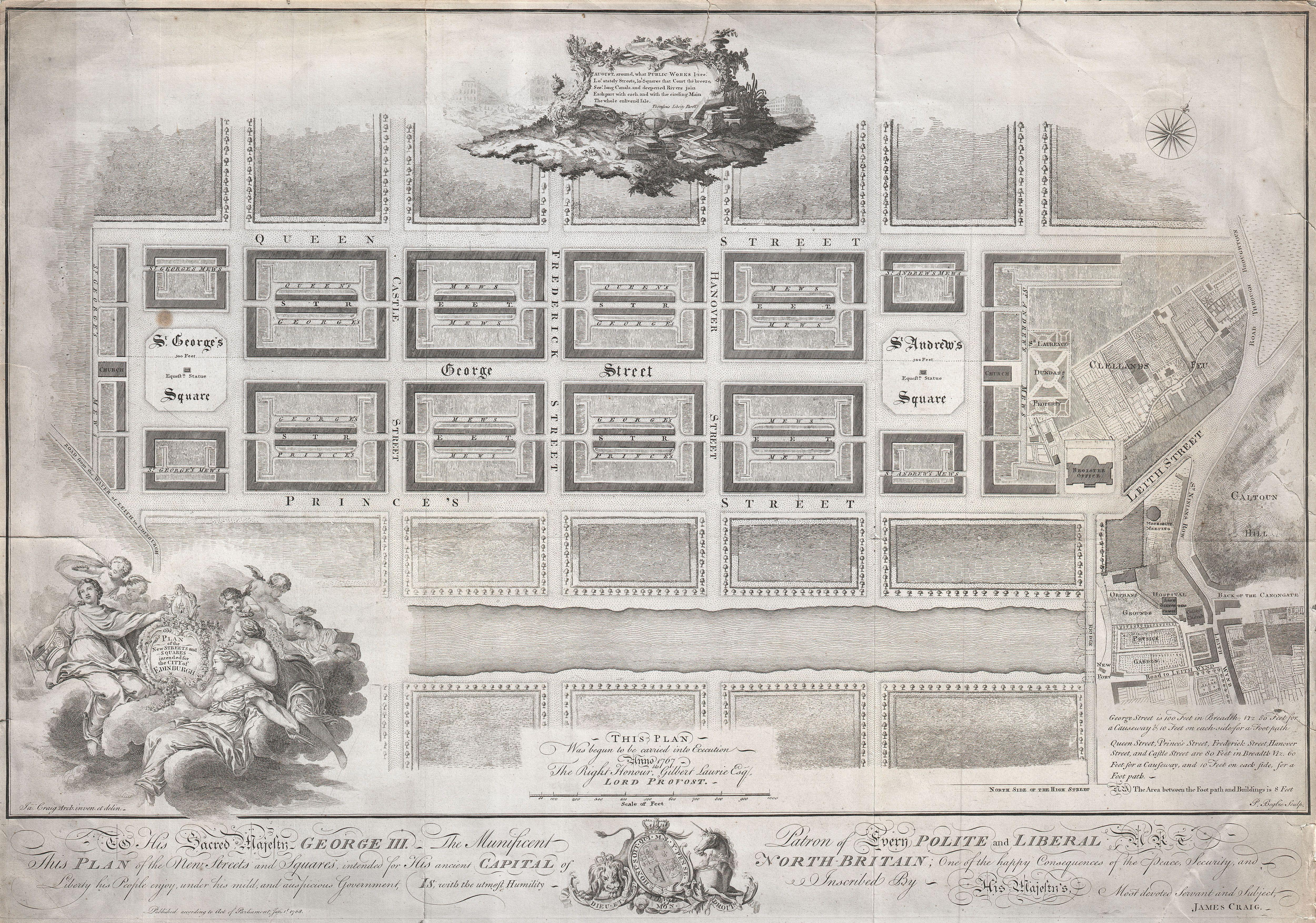
Plan for the New Town by James Craig (1768)

Craig's design for the New Town formed a grid-like pattern consisting three principal streets and two large squares with gardens for the residents use. The main thoroughfare was George Street (named after King George III), right at the centre of the development running east to west; this was the only main street to have houses constructed on both sides. Princes Street (named in honour of the King's sons) which ran parallel to George Street was designed as a terrace (meaning that it had houses on only one side) overlooking what was to become Prince's Street Gardens and facing the Old Town lay to the south of the grid. Queen Street (named for Queen Charlotte, who was the wife of George III) ran parallel to George Street on the north side of the New Town. It also had houses on one side only and again gardens were laid out for the use of the residents of the street (these gardens are still private today).

At either end of George Street were the squares. At the east end of the New Town was St Andrew Square and at the west end was Charlotte Square. The original intention was to name this western square as St George's Square in order that both patron saints of Scotland and England were represented. However, another square on the south side of the Old Town had already been built and named George Square, so to avoid any confusion between the two the New Town square was renamed in honour of the Queen. Craig's grid design was enhanced by other streets and lanes in between the main three, including Rose Street and Thistle Street. This patriotic street naming was a deliberate attempt to show that Scotland was now fully on board with the Union with England after the final defeat of the Jacobites at the Battle of Culloden in 1746. Three further streets which ran on a north to south axis completed Craig's grid: these were Hanover Street (named after the royal dynasty), Frederick Street (named after the father of George III) and Castle Street, for the views of Edinburgh Castle which the streets position affords.

The New Town was built from St Andrew Square in the east and continued west. Critics of the development began to complain that the streets were too plain and regimented and that there was a general lack of architectural merit. In response to this, Scotland's foremost architect of the day Robert Adam was asked to draw up elevations for Charlotte Square so that the New Town could be finished off with a flourish of grandeur and elegance. Adam drew up the plans in 1791, but he did not live to see the completion of the square, since he died in 1792 just as building work was commencing. The first houses were completed on the north elevation of the square and were ready for occupation by the mid-1790s. No. 7, today's Georgian House, was completed in 1796 and was purchased for £1,800 by John Lamont to serve as his townhouse to be used during the social season.

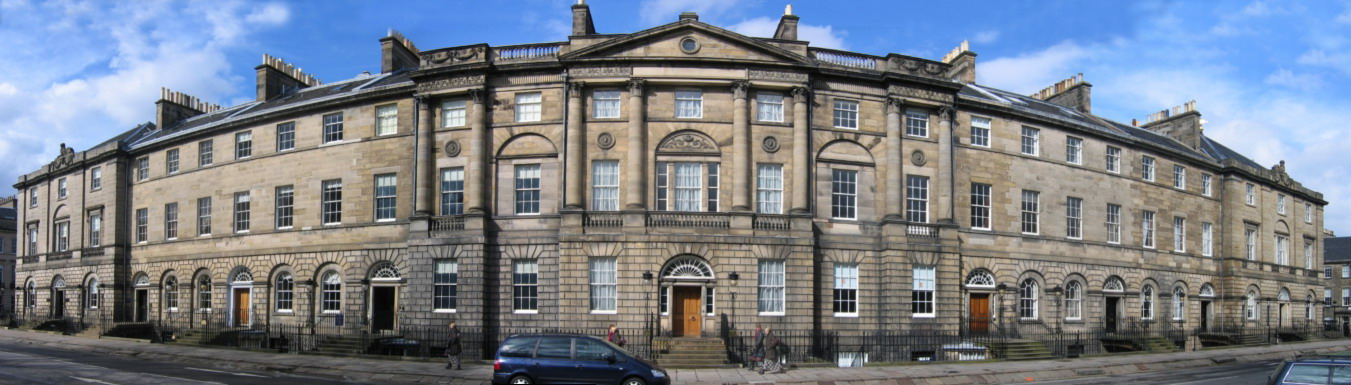
The north side of Robert Adam's Charlotte Square. No. 6 or Bute House, official residence of the First Minister of Scotland, is in the centre and the Georgian House No. 7 is next door on the left of the picture.

== Occupants of No. 7 Charlotte Square ==
1796-1815

John Lamont of Lamont was born in c. 1741 and was the eldest of seven children. He became the 18th Chief of the Clan Lamont in 1767 and inherited the Ardlamont Estate in Argyllshire. As a member of the landed gentry he was not in paid employment and his main income came from the rents collected from his tenants. In 1773, he married Helen Campbell and the couple had five children together: John, Amelia, Norman, Georgina and Helen Elizabeth.

Although John Lamont was a comparatively wealthy person he had inherited some debts and owing to his own extravagant lifestyle his financial difficulties began to mount up. He spent much of his time in London where he attempted to involve himself in politics and lived beyond his means. His portrait was painted by one of Scotland's most sought after artists of the day, Henry Raeburn. He died at his Ardlamont country seat in 1816, heavily in debt. The previous year he had sold No. 7 Charlotte Square for £3,000 and had abandoned his urban pursuits.

It is this first owner who is of most interest to the visitors of the Georgian House today, due to the fact that it has been restored to represent what the house may have looked like at the time it was occupied by the Lamont family around the turn of the 19th century.

1815-1845

The second owner of the property was Mrs Catherine Farquharson of Invercauld. She was a widow with three children. Catherine was the only survivor of 11 children and she therefore inherited her father's estate, which in normal circumstances would have gone to the male heir, so she was a woman of independent wealth. The 1841 shows that she was living in the house with one relative and eight servants. The house was sold in 1845.

1845-1889

Charles Neaves, Lord Neaves bought the house in 1845. He had a very distinguished career as a criminal lawyer. In 1852 he was made Solicitor-General, before succeeding Lord Cockburn to the bench in 1853. Five years later he was appointed a Lord of Judiciary. In 1851 the census shows that he and his wife had eight children, and employed six servants. By 1861, there were 10 children and 10 servants which included a butler and a pageboy. In 1881 Mrs Neaves is a widow and her three unmarried daughters live with her, along with seven servants.

1889-1927

In 1889 Rev Alexander Whyte moved into No. 7 with his wife. It was to be his home for the next 27 years. He was minister of St. George's Free Church. The couple had altogether eight children. Robert aged 24 was killed in action in the First World War, Alexander Frederick, born in 1883 was an MP, was knighted and became the President of the Indian Legislative Assembly. Dr Whyte was born in 1836 in Kirriemuir and he served his apprenticeship to a shoemaker before becoming a school teacher. He saved up enough money to go to Aberdeen University and then to New College, Edinburgh to study theology. In 1880 he became minister of Free St George's and in 1880 he married Jane Barbour of Bonskeid. Nine years later they moved into No. 7 Charlotte Square from 52 Melville Street. He died in 1921, and Mrs Whyte remained in the house as a widow until 1927.

It was during the occupancy of the Whytes that in 1913, `Abdu'l-Bahá the son of the founder of the Baháʼí Faith came to stay at No. 7 Charlotte Square during his tour of the United kingdom.

1927-1966

The Bute Family were the fifth owners of No. 7 Charlotte Square. It was the 4th Marquess of Bute (1881–1947) who in 1927 purchased the house and added it to his earlier acquisitions of Nos. 5 and 6, so now he owned the middle section of Robert Adam's 'palace front' design. He used his influence to get the other owners of properties on the North side of the square to restore the facade to be more in line with Adam's original design. He removed many Victorian alterations such as dormer windows in the attics, lower drawing room windows and altered front doors. The Marquis did not live in No. 7 and instead let it out to be used as the showrooms and workshops of Whytock and Reid, the antique dealers and cabinet makers.

On the death in 1956 of the 5th marquess of Bute, Nos 5, 6 and 7 passed through the Land Fund procedures to the National Trust for Scotland (NTS) in part satisfaction of death duties. After the lease to Whytock and Reid expired in 1973 The NTS decided to restore the basement, ground and first floors of the property as a Georgian Show House, not a museum, but as close as possible to a living house, so that it gives the feeling of a family home. The restoration was designed by Schomberg Scott who had a long history of working with the NTS and was his final project before retiring.

== No. 7 Charlotte Square Today, The Georgian House ==
The Georgian House is one of the most visited sites in the NTS, and plays host to in excess of 40,000 visitors each year, from local schoolchildren to sightseers from all over the world. Over 200 local people volunteer at the Georgian House, the vast majority of them as 'room guides', who are there to answer any questions that visitors may have as they walk round the house. Most of the furnishings and fittings in the house date from at the later Georgian period (c1760-1830), but some objects are older still.

When visitors arrive at the property they are greeted at the reception in the Hallway, here the admission tickets are issued and a member of staff or volunteer gives an introduction to the house and points them in the direction they should go to begin the tour of the property. There is no guided tour, visitors are free to walk around the house at their own pace, and in each of the main restored rooms there is a volunteer guide on hand to answer visitors questions.

The Basement

The Kitchen is found at the rear of the basement and has an adjoining scullery, it is well equipped with items which all date back to the Georgian period and have been acquired for the trust over the years. There is also a Servants Room and wine cellar. On this floor there is also a gift shop, the house wine cellar and a china closet.

The Ground Floor

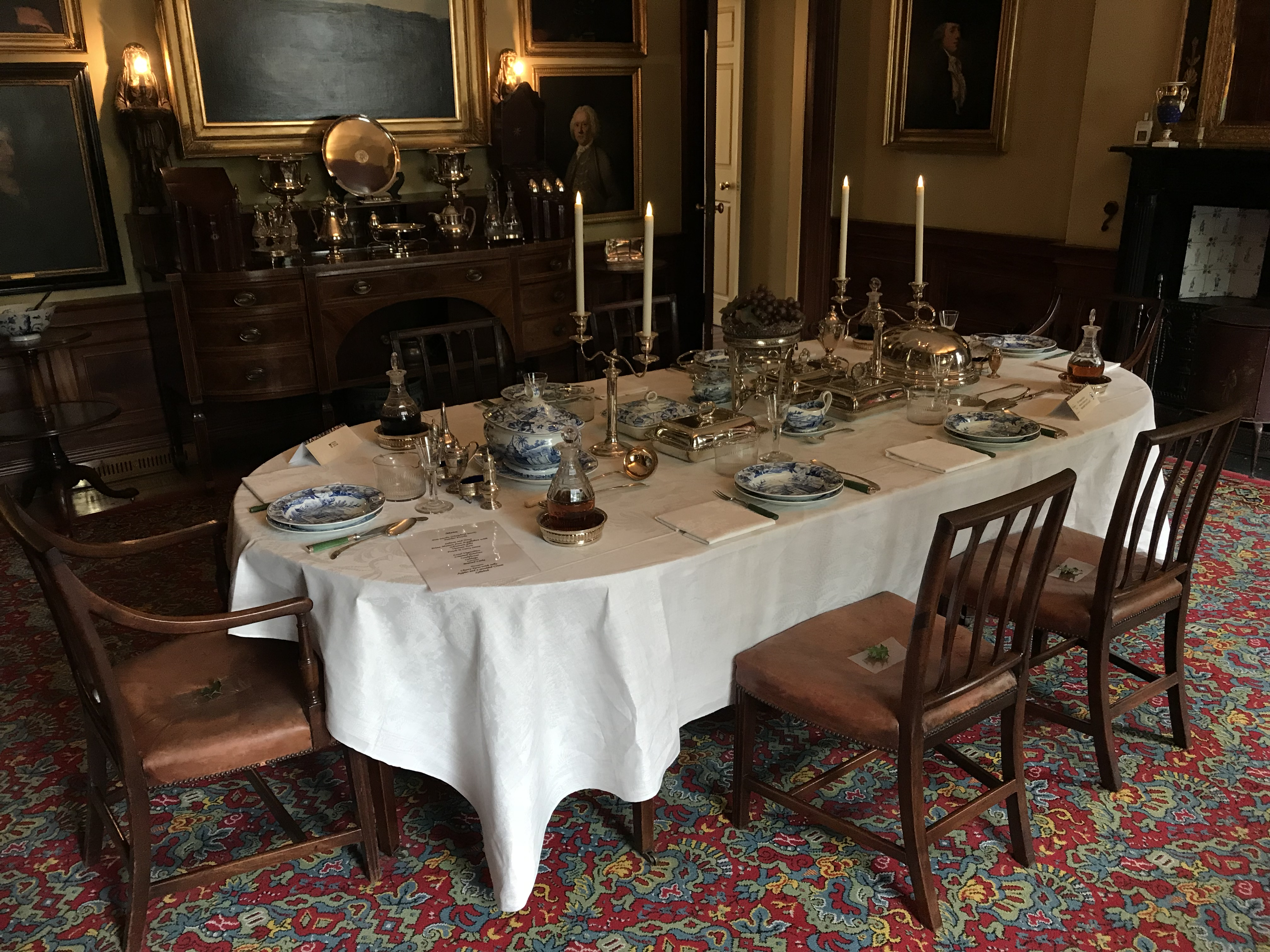
The dining room

There are two rooms to be seen on the ground floor. The dining room is at the front of the house, the table is set as it would have been for dinner around 1810. The walls are adorned with many portraits, in the 18th and 19th century this was done so that you could show off about your ancestors as you entertained friends to dinner.

There is a narrow passage between the dining room and the bedroom which contains a c. 1805 flushing toilet. The master bedroom overlooks the rear of the house and sits directly above the kitchen. The bed is the dominant feature in the room, it dates from 1774 and was made for Newliston House on the outskirts of Edinburgh.

The First Floor

There are a further two rooms on this floor - the Drawing Room, and the Parlour. The Drawing Room is at the front of the house overlooking Charlotte Square garden. It is the full width of the house, and it is where the family would have entertained on a more lavish scale. There are many fine paintings on the walls, some by well-known artists, a neo-classical revival marble fireplace and an 1802 square piano of which a recording of it being played can be heard in the background in this room. As of 2011 this room features a fitted carpet which represents the fact that these were commonly found in drawing rooms in the 18th century. The new carpet was made to an original design from 1797.

The Parlour is the room where the family would have gathered on a daily basis, as they would have only opened up the drawing room when entertaining on a larger scale. This is the room where tea would have been served and therefore there are tea caddies on the table, there are also two tea tables and there are Minton and Spode tea services in the bureau. The walls are painted the same colour as in the drawing room to reflect the fact that on an evening when there was large entertainments both rooms would be used to accommodate guests. The colour scheme is based on research carried out by the trust into Culzean Castle which was being decorated at the time Charlotte Square was being built.

Second and Third Floors

Most visitors to the house choose to begin the tour in the second floor. Here there is a short film which introduces the visitors to the history of the New Town, and to the lifestyle of the Lamont family and their servants in around the year 1810. These two floors have not been restored, as until recently they were used as the flat of the Moderator of the Church of Scotland. Nowadays on the Second Floor there are public toilets, and one of the larger rooms has been opened up as an activity room for young and old where they can handle objects which were common in the Georgian times and guess what they were used for, write with a feather quill pen, and the children can try on some Georgian style clothes.

== Visitor Information ==
The Georgian House is open from 1 March to 31 October. Opening hours for most of the season are 10am to 5pm, last admission at 4pm.
