= Dunbar Collegiate Church =

Church in East Lothian, Scotland

Dunbar Parish Church
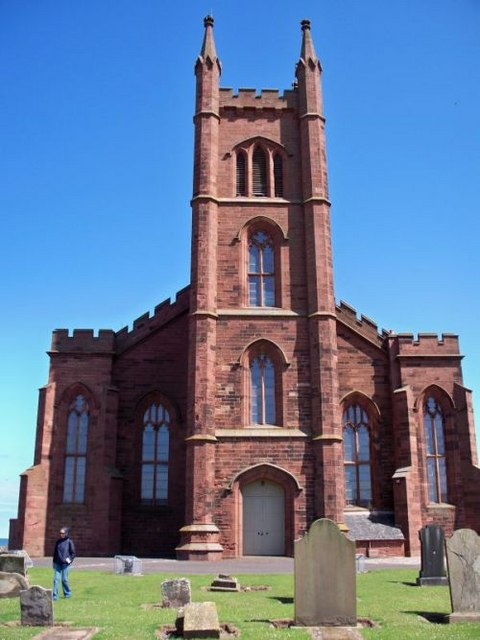
- Dunbar Parish Church
- Dunbar Parish Church
- 55.99911°N 2.51179°W
- Location: Dunbar
- Country: Scotland
- Denomination: Church of Scotland
- Website: dunbarparishchurch.org

Architecture
- Heritage designation: Category A
- Designated: 5 February 1971
- Architect: James Gillespie Graham
- Style: Perpendicular Gothic
- Groundbreaking: 1818
- Completed: 1821

Administration
- Parish: Dunbar

Dunbar Collegiate Church is renowned as having been the first collegiate church, in 1342, to have been established in the Lothians. The church was situated on the same site as the present-day parish church, on Queen's Road just south of Dunbar town centre.

== History ==
The first mention of a church at Dunbar came in 1176 in the Taxatio of Lothian when the church was described as Eclessia de Dunbar. This church, dedicated to St. Bega, served the parish as a whole until 1342 and its foundation as a collegiate church. On 21 April 1342, Patrick, 9th Earl of Dunbar was granted by charter, his right to the proprietorship of the church. The church would have a dean, archdean and eight prebendaries with responsibility to Dunbar, these being Spott, Belton, Pinkerton, Linton, Chirnside, Dunse, Stenton and Pitcox. The Dunbars were no strangers to the patronage of religious establishments, with the foundation of a house of Trinity friars in 1218, and then a monastery of Carmelite monks in 1263, by the 6th and 7th earls respectively. Dunbar Collegiate continued as decreed until it became forfeit to the crown in 1435. For a while the church was 'enjoyed' by the Duke of Albany during the reign of King James III of Scotland, before returning to the Dunbars. In 1483, it, once again, reverted to the crown and stayed that way until the Protestant Reformation in 1560.

== Post Reformation ==
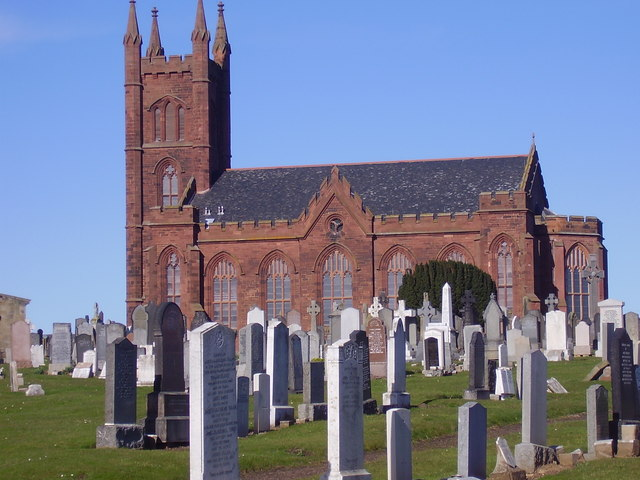
Another view of Dunbar Kirk

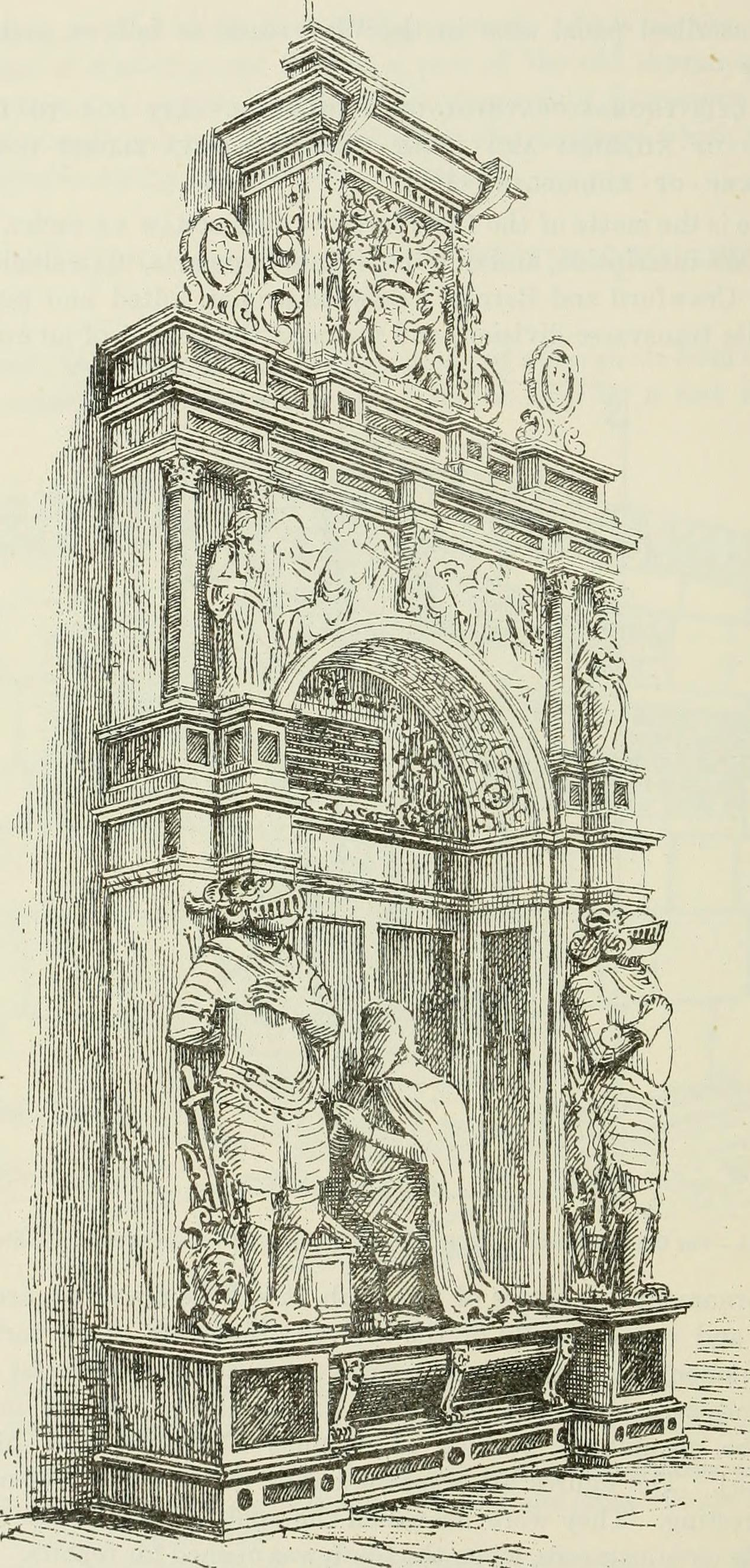
Monument to George Home, 1st Earl of Dunbar

Dunbar Collegiate Church, unlike many other chapels, churches and monasteries in the area, was spared from the over-zealous exploits of the people as they rejoiced in the popular fury, laying waste and burning anything associated with old faith. The old church became, once again, the parish church, this time of the reformed faith. Much repair and renewal work had been carried out over the years, the building looked like a hybrid of Saxon, Gothic and Norman architecture. In 1779 the church was almost totally rebuilt. Then in 1819–1821 a new church was built, and opened on 20 April 1821 with the Reverend John Jaffray the first minister at the new building. There is a magnificent monument in the church to a tireless servant of James VI and I, George Hume, 1st Earl of Dunbar (1556-1611), High Treasurer of Scotland and Chancellor of the Exchequer of England.

The church was restored and re-opened in 1897 at a cost of £4,500 (equivalent to £505,698 in 2025). This work consisted in removing the whole of the old interior with its high gallery and introducing a nave and aisle arrangement with an arcade of five stone arches on each side, and throwing out the apse of a semi-octagonal form at the east end. These alterations provided room at the east end of the church for. a communion table, communion chair and seats for the elsders. The monument to the Earl of Dunbar which stood directly behind the pulpit was removed to the east end of the north aisle. A vestry for the minister was added behind the monument. The pulpit and organ chamber were placed on the opposite side. Some stained glass in memory of the Hay and Drysdale families were added in the angular windows. A gallery was provided at the west end approached by staircases fitted into the western turrets. The room over the tower vestibule was fitted up as an elders’ vestry. Accommodation was provided for 1,400 worshippers. The work was carried out by W. & J. Hay, architects of Liverpool.

== Noted Cleric ==
Columba de Dunbar became dean of the Collegiate Church in 1412 before taking up at the post of Bishop of Moray at Elgin Cathedral where he died in 1435. He is buried in the Dunbar Aisle at the great cathedral.

== See also ==
- List of places in East Lothian
- List of collegiate churches in Scotland
