= Northfield House =

Historic house at Preston, East Lothian, Scotland

Coordinates: 55.9545°N 2.9797°W

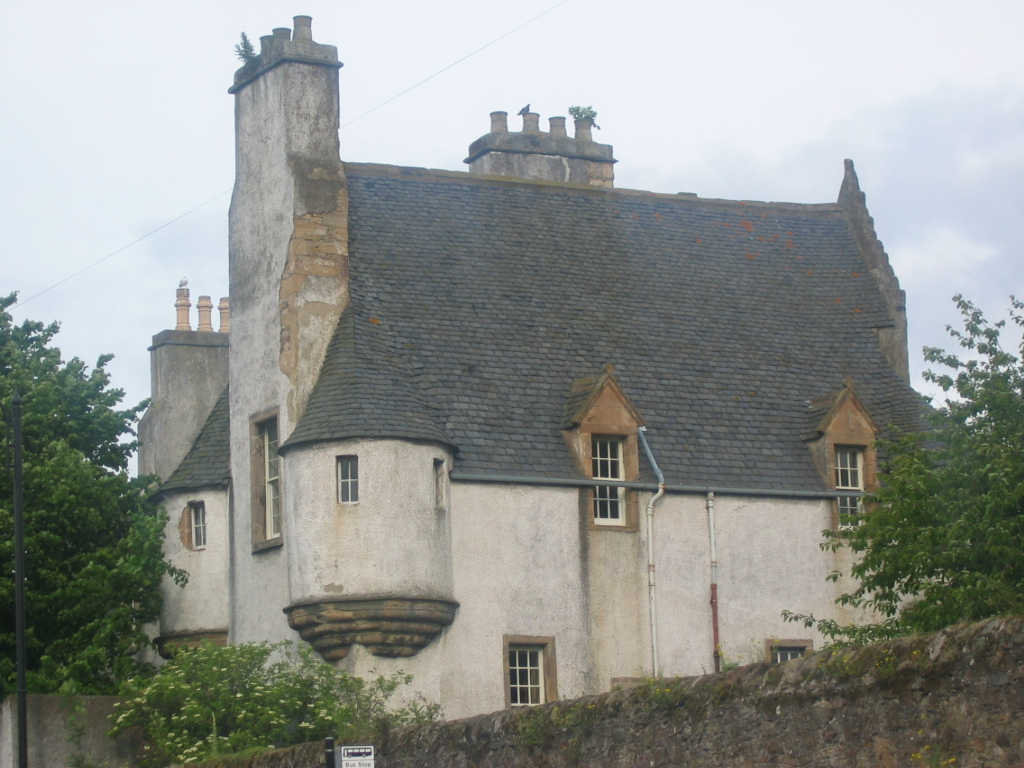

General information
- Type: Preston, East Lothian
- Location: Scotland

Northfield House is a seventeenth-century historic house at Preston, East Lothian, Scotland, UK. It is situated very close to Hamilton House and Preston Tower, and one mile east to Prestongrange House and the Royal Musselburgh Golf Club. It is a Category A listed building.

== History ==
This L-plan house was built for the Hamiltons of Preston (who occupied nearby Preston Tower) in the late 16th century and was sold to Joseph Marjoribanks, a burgess of Edinburgh in 1607. He and his wife Marion Symesoune enlarged and embellished the house, the completion of the work being commemorated by the magnificent door on the south side of the house which incorporates the date 1611 and the motto (in Scots) "Excep the Lord Buld Inwane Bulds Man" and the Marjoribanks and Symesoune arms. Marjoribanks was a Baillie of Edinburgh. In 1617, when James VI and I visited Scotland, Marjoribanks hosted banquets for the courtiers James Maxwell and James Bowie and the Lord Provost, William Nisbet, and for the Dean of Westminster, George Montaigne.

The house was occupied for most of the 17th century by the Marjoribanks family, and was eventually sold around the year 1700. In 1746 it was owned by a surgeon named A. Nesbit, and later by James Syme, a slater, whose son, a Royal Navy Captain, later sold it in 1896 to James McNeill a mining engineer from Wishaw who had acquired the estate to work the coal.

In 1954 the architect Schomberg Scott bought Northfield House with its walled garden of about 2 acres from Miss McNeill, James McNeill's daughter. Miss McNeill sold off the remainder of the estate for development over the ensuing years with the result that the house is now surrounded by 19th and 20th century development of mixed quality and the old home farm buildings are converted into dwellings. An early 17th century chimneypiece was added in 1954 having been rescued from the demolition of the nearby Woolmet House due to mine workings.

By 1999 the house and garden were in serious disrepair and in late 1999 the trustees of Mr and Mrs Scott's contract of marriage trust sold it to Finlay Lockie who has been restoring both house and garden gradually since. Finlay Lockie gave a tour of the House on BBC Two's "Castle in the Country", season 4, episode 9 (part of the Floors Castle series), first broadcast on 23 July 2008.

Apart from a brief period between the death of Schomberg Scott and acquisition of the house by Finlay Lockie, the house has been continuously occupied as a private house. It has never belonged to East Lothian Council, though the council was concerned as to its future when it was empty and has been supportive of Lockie's restoration efforts. The National Trust for Scotland did at one time consider making the house into a museum of painted ceilings - the house has several fine ceilings (beam and board painted in floral patterns and arabesques in egg tempera) in good condition, but this plan never came to fruition. The house was put on the market in October 2020.

In the former grounds of Northfield House stands a 16th-century beehive doocot (Scots for "dovecot"), also a Category A listed building. There are also some interesting garden features including brick-lined walls (18th and 19th century) and a mock bartizan accessible by a stone stair within the garden.

== See also ==
- List of places in East Lothian

== Photo gallery ==
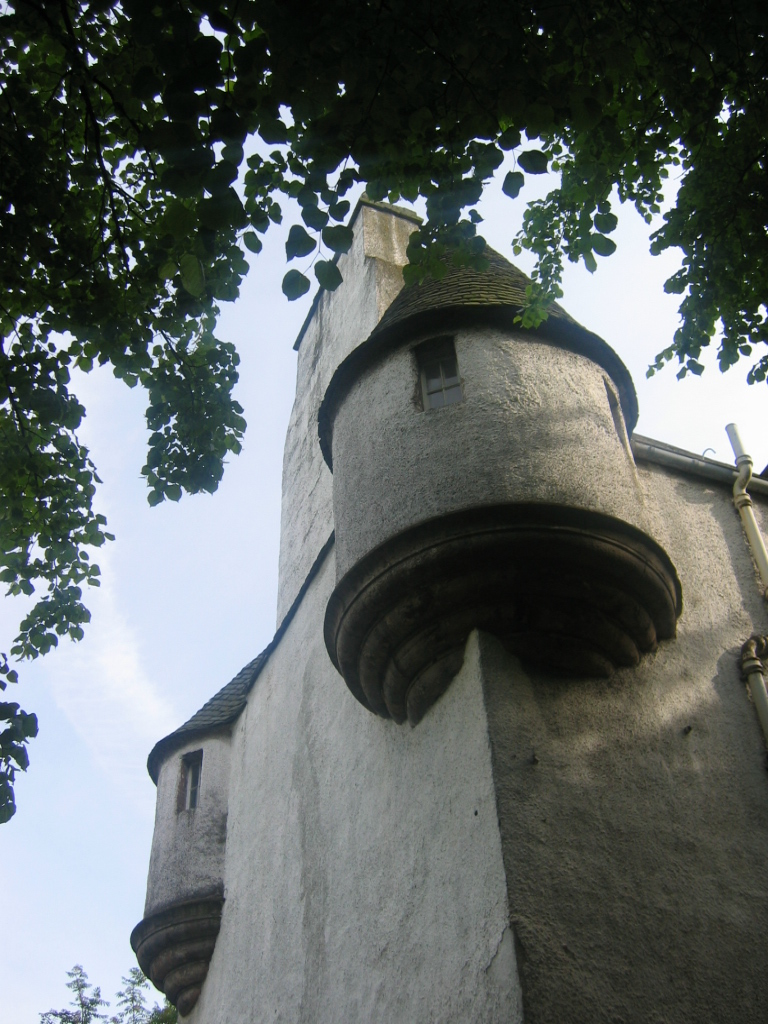

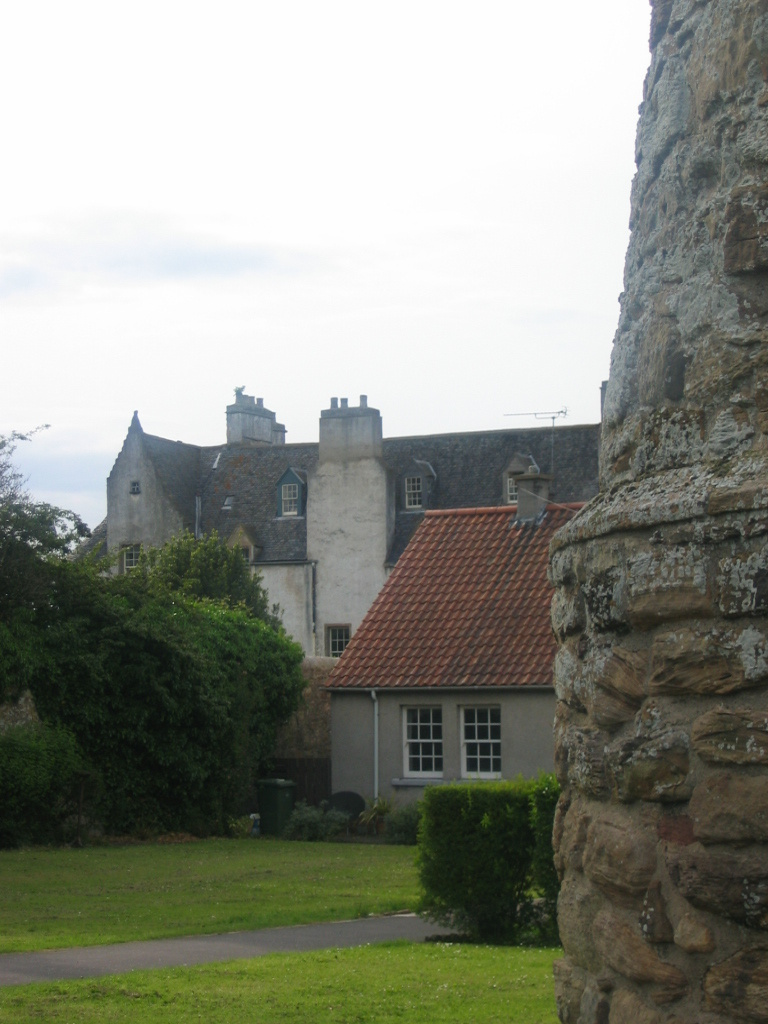

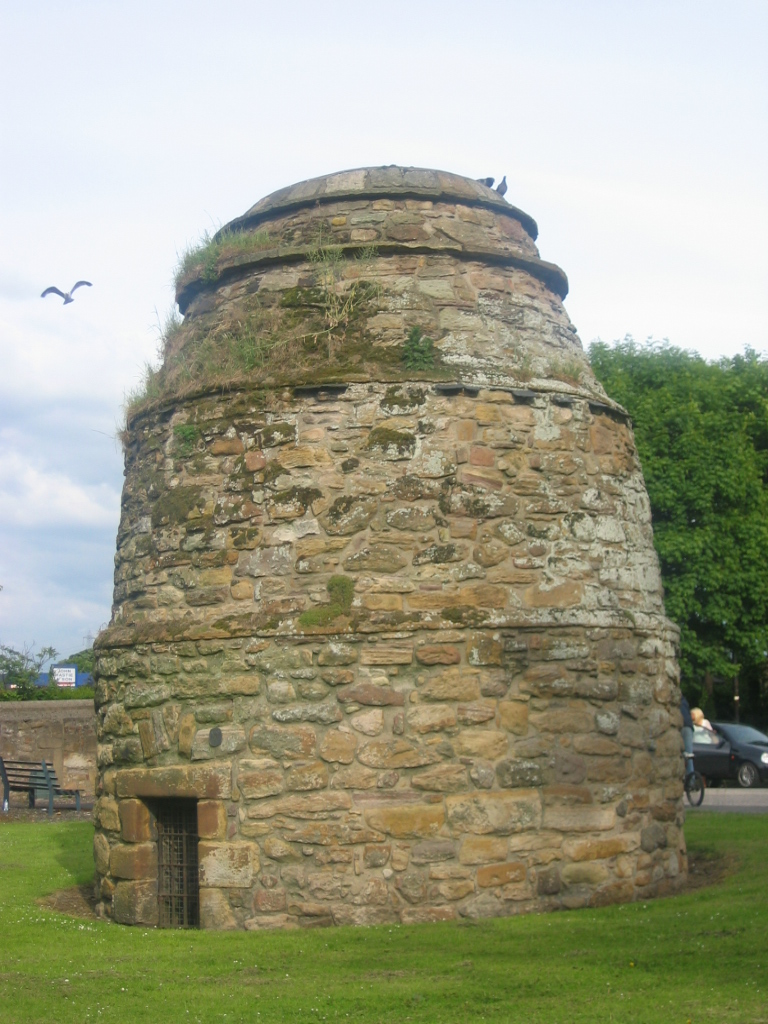

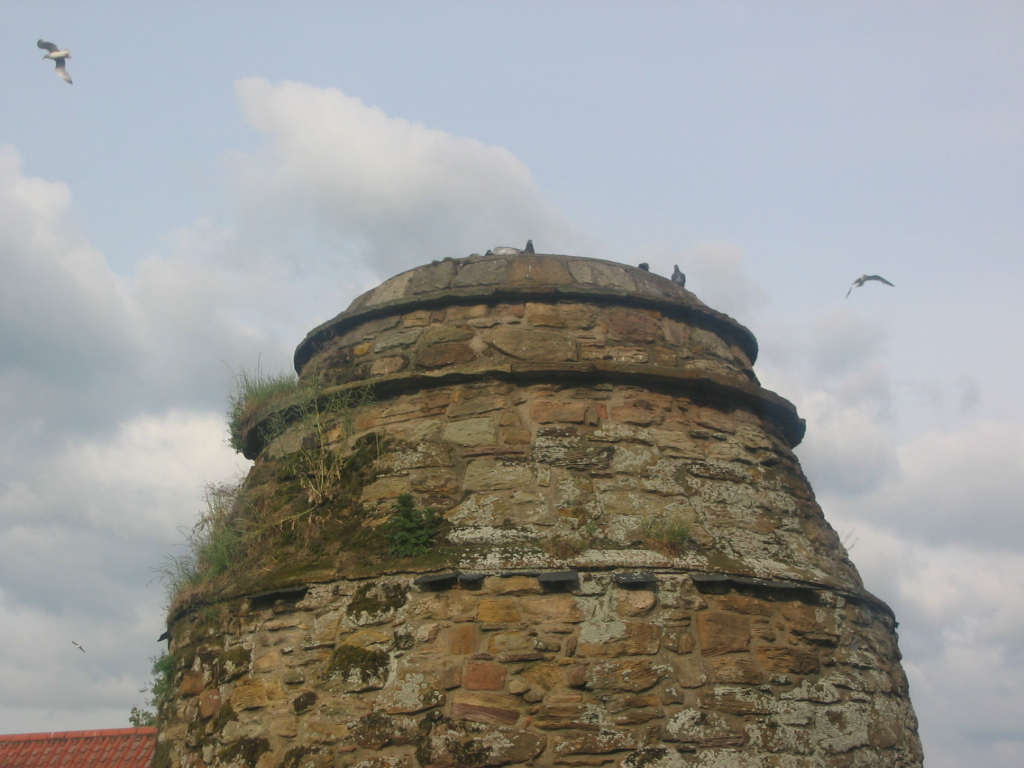
