= Preston Tower, East Lothian =

Ruined keep in East Lothian, Scotland

Coordinates: 55.9557°N 2.9781°W

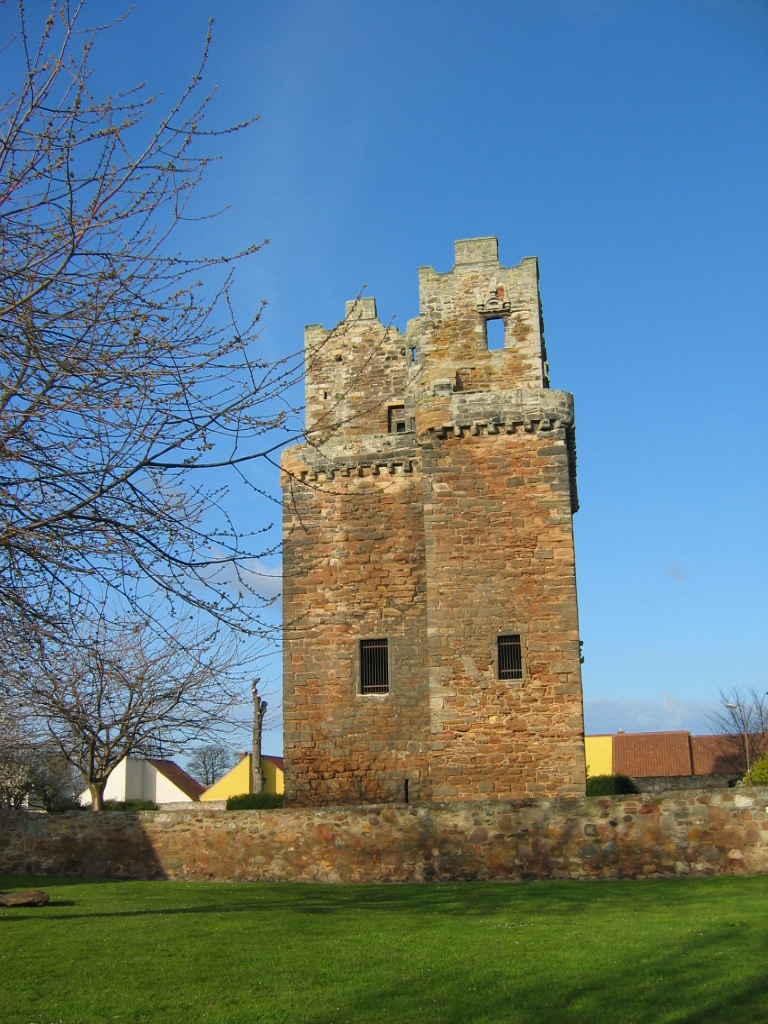
Preston Tower

Preston Tower is a ruined L-plan keep in the ancient Scottish village of Prestonpans. It is situated within a few metres of two other historic houses, Hamilton House and Northfield House.

== History ==
The original structure, some of which may date from the 14th century, has four storeys. A further two storeys were added above the parapet in 1626, with Renaissance windows bearing the initials SIDKH (Sir John and Dame Katherine Hamilton).

The entrance to the Tower had a lean-to hoarding from which items could be dropped, for instance boulders, hot sand, or boiling oil.

Preston passed by marriage to the "haughty Hamiltons" (also known as "Hameldone") at the close of the 14th century. David Hamilton of Preston went to France with James V in 1536. Preston Tower was burnt by the Earl of Hertford on 16 May 1544 following the burning of Edinburgh during the war known as the Rough Wooing. David Hamilton was a Master Usher for Regent Arran, and a depute warden of the Middle March of the border with England. The Preston estate included a coal mine, and John Hamilton sent coal by boat to Dunbar Castle.

During her Regency of Scotland, Mary of Guise anticipated an English invasion and asked Hamilton and the inhabitants of Prestonpans and Tranent to accommodate and provide food for French soldiers in May 1555 and February 1558. Supplies for the forts at Eyemouth and Inchkeith, including building lime, were shipped from Preston. Hamilton fought for Mary, Queen of Scots at the battle of Langside, and his son, the younger laird of Preston, was captured and made prisoner.

David Hamilton's widow, Jonet Bailie, died in 1592. Her will mentions cattle and hogs on the farm, and an iron chain and winch with buckets for draining a mine. Their son George married Barbara Cockburn (died November 1610), a daughter of John Cockburn of Ormiston. In 1587, George Hamilton of Preston and his brothers Patrick and John Hamilton feuar of Preston had attacked the lawyer and author Habbakuk Bissett at St Giles' Cathedral, injuring his hand. Patrick Hamilton was captain of Brodick Castle and committed other crimes on Arran, and was denounced as a rebel. John Hamilton was imprisoned in Blackness Castle to await trial.

In August 1617, James VI and I (who had returned to Scotland for a visit) made Preston and Prestonpans a free barony for George Hamilton's grandson John and his wife Jean Otterburn, including rights to hold St Jerome's fair for three days in October and rebuild the harbour. John Hamilton and the Earl of Lothian held a trial for John Hunter, the blacksmith in Prestonpans. Over several years he had stolen iron plough shares and fittings from farms in the neighbouring villages for scrap metal. John married secondly, Katherine Howison (died 1629) and their initials were carved on Preston Tower. They employed a stone mason, William Pedden, who also worked at Winton Castle, and a glazier, James Wauche. A family pew in the church also featured their carved initials and painted heraldry.

The tower was burnt again in 1650 Oliver Cromwell with the loss of the family records. After being restored it burnt again, accidentally, in 1663 and was abandoned for the nearby Preston House, East Lothian. One of the Hamilton family was the noted covenanter Robert Hamilton, a commander in the battles of Drumclog and Bothwell Brig. After this, the family were forfeited in 1684, but recovered the property in the 19th century.

Preston Tower was purchased by the National Trust for Scotland in 1969. It is currently under the guardianship of East Lothian Council.

The site also has a laburnum arch, and a herb garden, and a lectern-style doocot which dates from the mid-17th century, after Cromwell had sacked the Tower. Preston Tower has a pit-prison but the Preston Merkat Cross was eventually used as the local prison instead.

In 2026 the tower, along with the doocot and gardens, was one of ten winners of the annual Royal Incorporation of Architects in Scotland (RIAS) awards. The judges said that it "exemplifies careful stewardship of heritage, combining delicacy, rigour and social relevance to produce a building and landscape that is enduring, inspiring and beloved by its community".

== Photo gallery ==
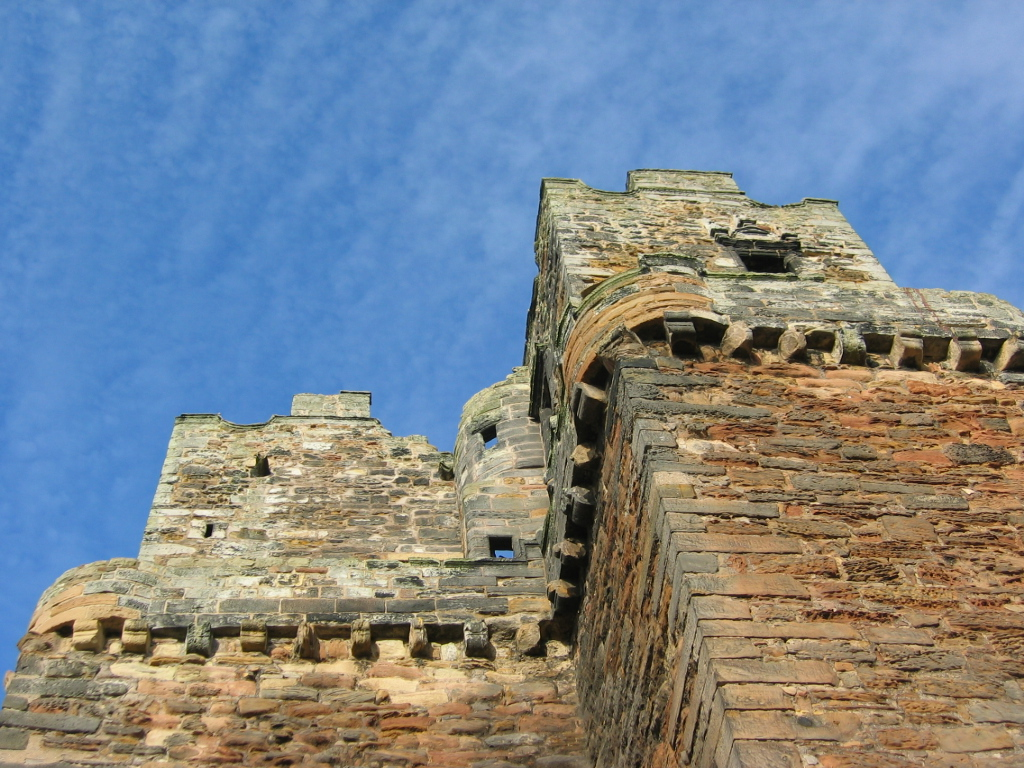

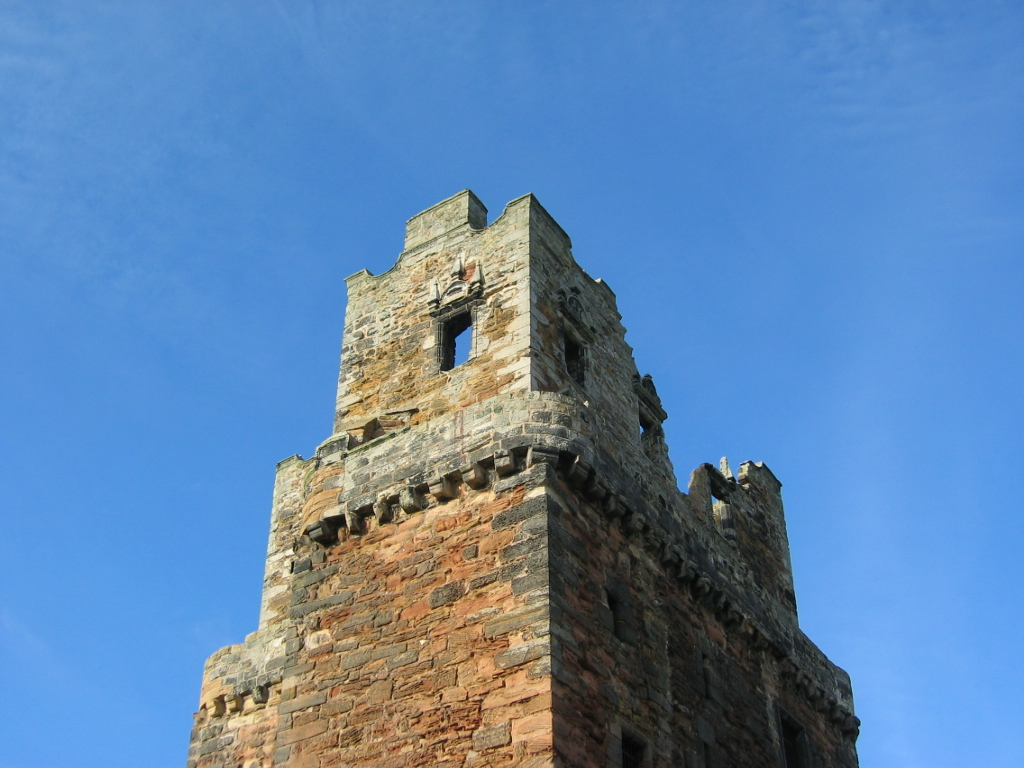

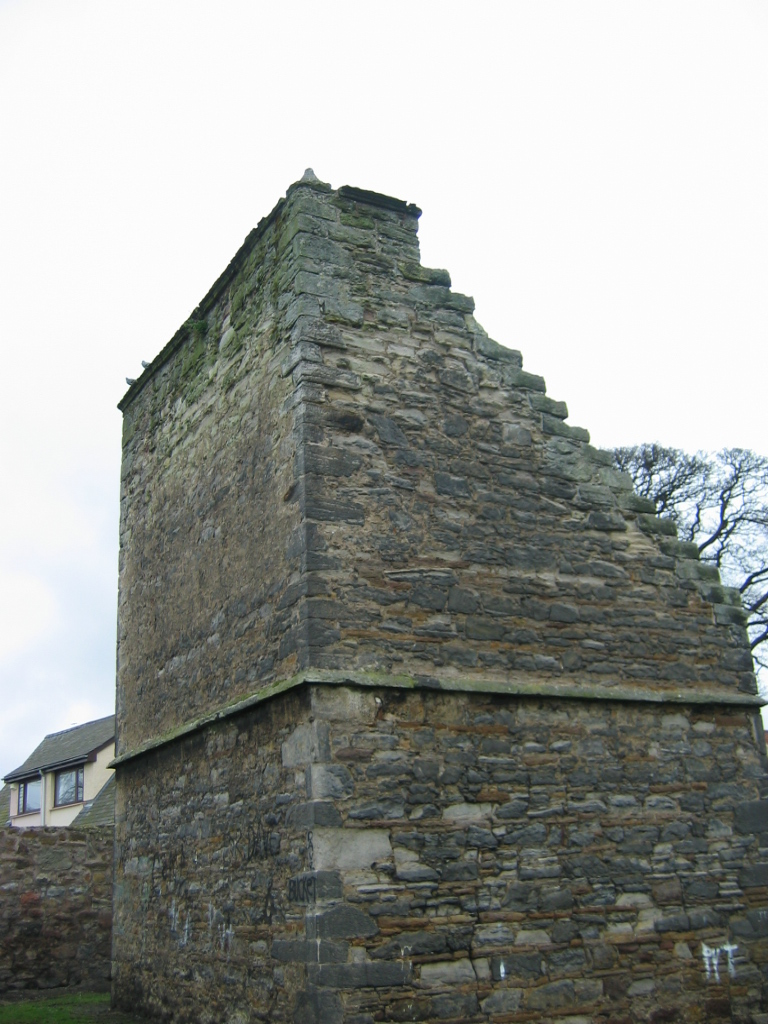
Lectern doocot at Preston Tower

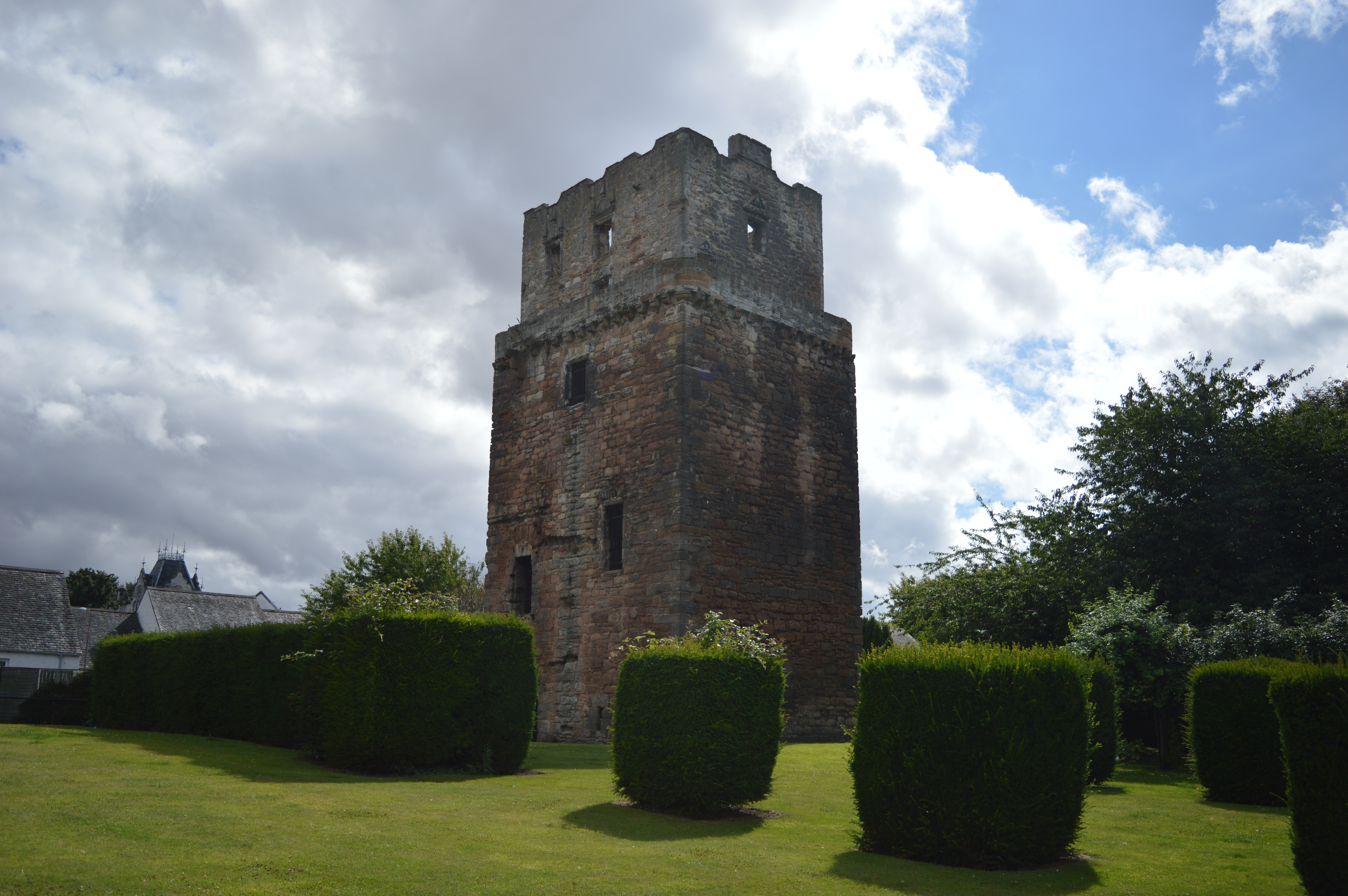

== See also ==
- List of places in East Lothian
