= Hamilton House, East Lothian =

Historic house in Prestonpans, East Lothian, Scotland

Coordinates: 55.9549°N 2.9788°W

Hamilton House, also known as Magdalen's House, is a 17th-century "Laird's House" in the town of Prestonpans in East Lothian, Scotland. It is an exemplar of this type of architecture and has retained its crow-stepped gables and corner towers. It is owned by the National Trust for Scotland and is a Category A Listed Building.

== History ==
The house was built in 1626 as a replacement for Preston Tower for Sir John Hamilton, Lord Magdalens, who was a Senator of the College of Justice and the brother of the 1st Earl of Haddington. The property was vacated by the Hamiltons in the 1740s, and in the 19th century it was converted into a barracks and later used as a tavern. Around 1880 the Hislop family are recorded as being the owners of the building. Eventually the building fell into dereliction and was about to be demolished when it was sold to The National Trust of Scotland in 1937 and the NTS restored it as a private residence. It is now a Category A Listed Building.

== Location ==
Hamilton House is located in the small town of Prestonpans in East Lothian, 12.6 miles (20.3 km) from Edinburgh. It sits at the corner of West Loan and Preston Road within the part of the town known as Preston near the Preston Tower, Prestonpans Mercat cross and Northfield House.

== Features ==
Hamilton House comprises a two-storey main block with projecting wings at either end. The date 1628 (or 1626) appears in a panel above the former main entrance, with the initials IH and KS representing Sir John Hamilton, Lord Magdalen, and Katherine Sympson, while thee three pediments of the dormers have the Hamilton's coat of arms, their impaled initials and the date 1628, as well as the arms of Katherine Sympson. The exterior is harled and whitewashed, has chamfered stone edges and crow-stepped gables, known in Scots as corbie-stepped. The chimney stacks have stripped quoins. The house has a hexagonal stair tower which stands in the corner of the main block with south wing and which contains the main entrance, above which is the inscription "Praised be the Lord My Strenth and My Redeimer", while at the other end of the main block there is a round conical roofed, corbelled-out turret. The house has a steep roof tiled with stones. When the road outside was widened an outbuilding and a passageway were demolished, reducing the size of the courtyard. The adjacent road is also around 500mm higher than the original dirt road, from when the surface was macadamed in the 19th century. The interior of the building has been completely re-ordered in relation to its original form.

== Controversy ==
The National Trust for Scotland wanted to sell the building in 2007 but changed their mind to find a "restoring tenant" but in 2017 concerns were raised from the local community about the condition of the building.

== Photo gallery ==
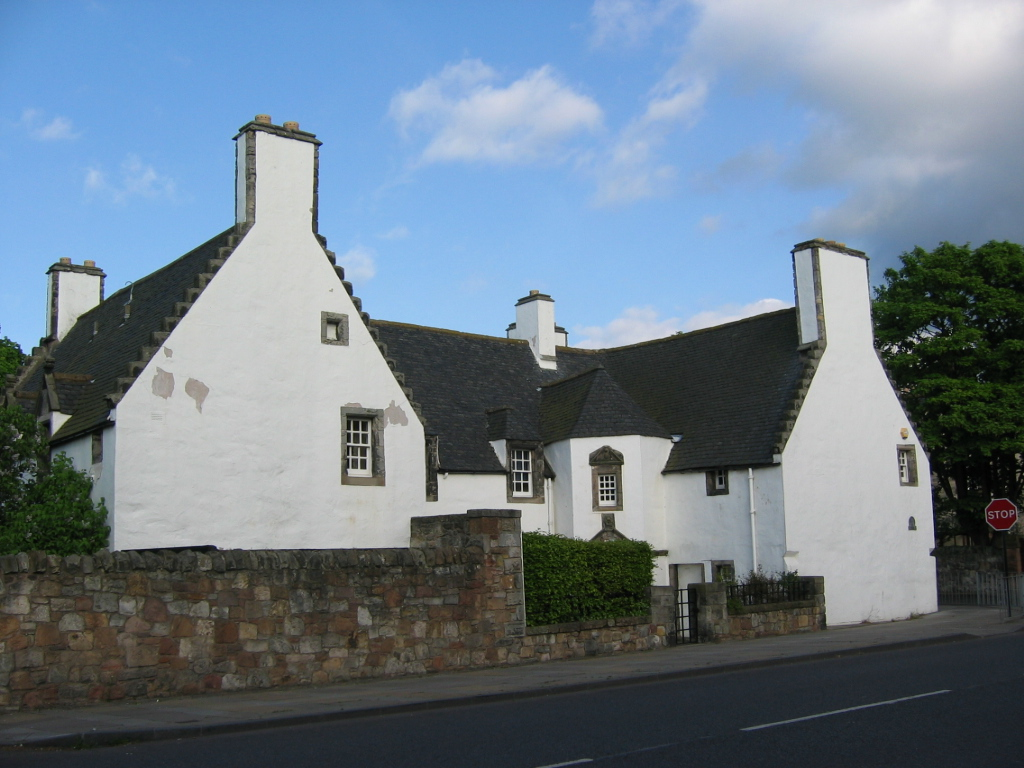

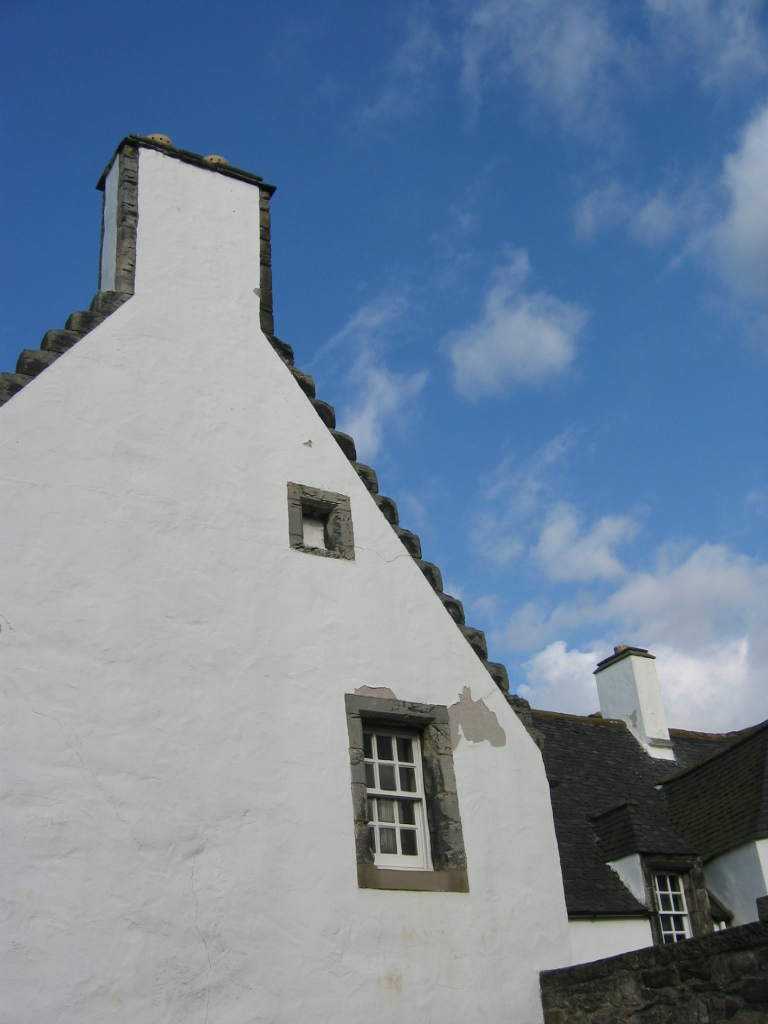

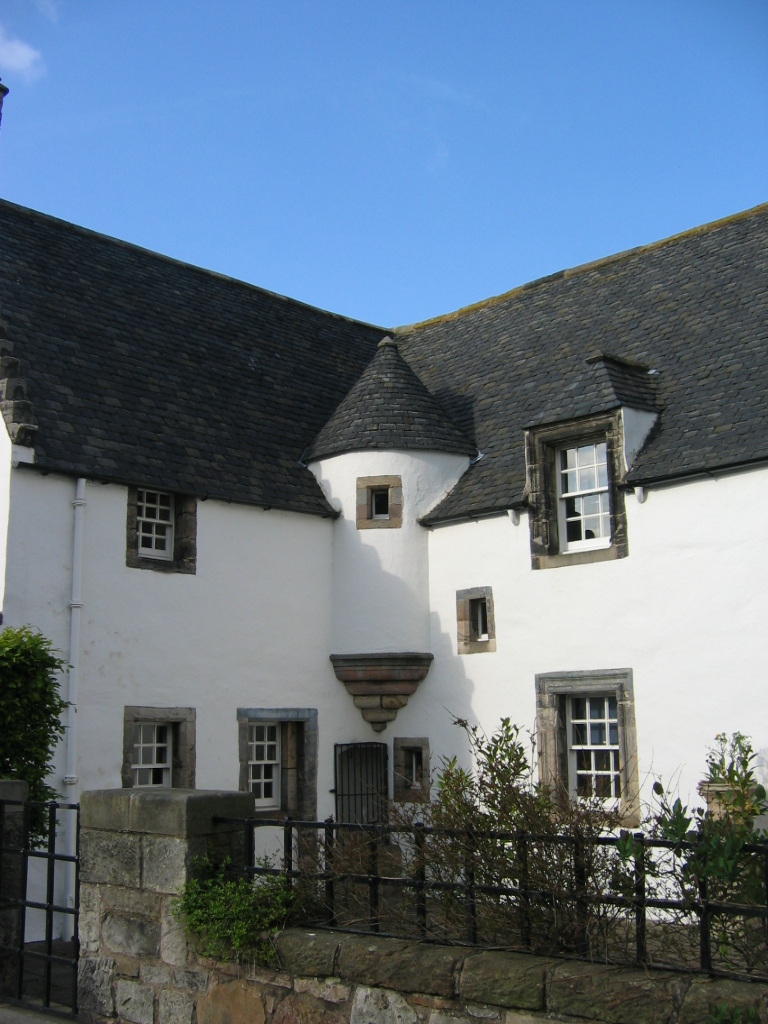

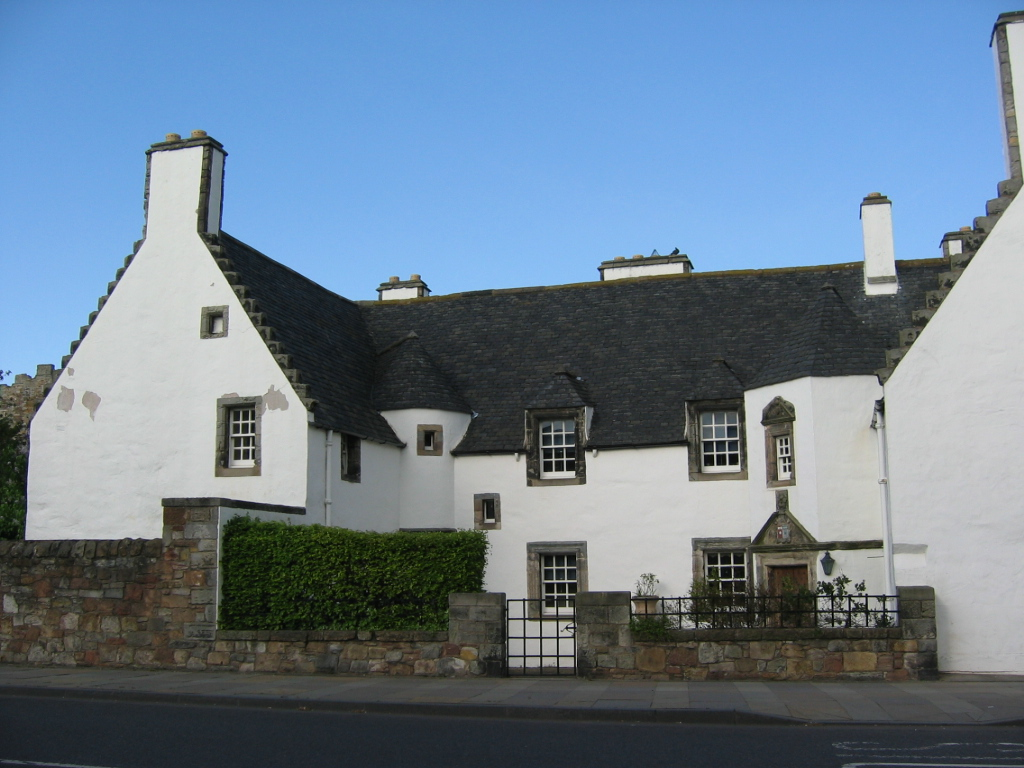

== See also ==
- Duke of Hamilton
- James Hamilton, 1st Duke of Hamilton
- List of places in East Lothian
