= James Macintyre Henry =

Scottish architect

James Mcintyre Henry (1852 – 18 September 1929) was an architect who practiced in Edinburgh and Lothian. His works include the Royal British Hotel and Lothian Chambers in Edinburgh.

== Early life ==
He was born in Dunkeld in 1852. His parents were William Henry, an innkeeper and Isabella Henry. He was their fourth son.

== Career ==
He was articled to Andrew Heiton in 1866 and stayed with him until 1872. He moved to Edinburgh, having secured a place in the office of David Bryce, then worked on Blair Castle for John Stewart-Murray, 7th Duke of Atholl. After the death of Bryce, he moved to the offices of John Charles Hay. He set up his own practice in 1883.

Thomas Forbes Maclennan became his assistant in 1894 and eventually went into partnership with him in 1905. Henry seems to have acted as practice manager from this point.
