= List of listed buildings in Prestonpans, East Lothian =

This is a list of listed buildings in the parish of Prestonpans in East Lothian, Scotland.

== List ==
| Name | Location | Date listed | Grid ref. (Note: Sometimes known as OSGB36, the grid reference (where provided) is based on the British national grid reference system used by the Ordnance Survey. • "Guide to National Grid". Ordnance Survey. • "Get-a-map". Ordnance Survey.) | Geo-coordinates | Notes | LB number (Note: Historic Environment Scotland assign a unique alphanumeric identifier to each designated site in Scotland, for listed buildings this always begins with "LB", for example "LB12345".) | Image |
|---|---|---|---|---|---|---|---|
| High Street, War Memorial | | | | 55°57′35″N 2°59′04″W | Category B | 43946 | Upload another image See more images |
| 228 High Street (Walford) With Garden Walls And N Gateway | | | | 55°57′31″N 2°59′20″W | Category C(S) | 40323 | Upload Photo |
| Preston, Preston Tower, Walls And Gatepiers | | | | 55°57′21″N 2°58′39″W | Category B | 17532 | Upload another image |
| Preston, Preston Road, Nursery Cottage, Including Boundary Wall And Gate | | | | 55°57′18″N 2°58′38″W | Category C(S) | 47015 | Upload Photo |
| Harlaw Hill House, With Stables And West Boundary Wall | | | | 55°57′38″N 2°58′47″W | Category A | 40322 | Upload Photo |
| Preston, Northfield House Dovecot | | | | 55°57′14″N 2°58′43″W | Category A | 17528 | Upload another image See more images |
| Preston, Hamilton House, Including Boundary Walls, Doorway, Gatepiers, Gate And Railings | | | | 55°57′18″N 2°58′44″W | Category A | 17529 | Upload another image See more images |
| 147-155 (Odd Nos) High Street | | | | 55°57′33″N 2°59′07″W | Category C(S) | 43947 | Upload Photo |
| Rock Cottage | | | | 55°57′37″N 2°59′01″W | Category C(S) | 43949 | Upload Photo |
| Prestongrange Colliery, Pump House And Pump | | | | 55°57′07″N 3°00′18″W | Category A | 17534 | Upload Photo |
| Prestongrange Colliery, Old Generating House | | | | 55°57′07″N 3°00′17″W | Category B | 17535 | Upload Photo |
| Prestongrange House | | | | 55°57′09″N 2°59′47″W | Category A | 17537 | Upload another image See more images |
| Preston, Preston Road, Dovecot House, Including Boundary Wall | | | | 55°57′17″N 2°58′44″W | Category C(S) | 47014 | Upload another image |
| Prestongrange House, Boundary Walls | | | | 55°57′12″N 2°59′34″W | Category B | 47021 | Upload Photo |
| Prestongrange House, East Lodge, And Gate Arch | | | | 55°57′14″N 2°59′36″W | Category C(S) | 47022 | Upload Photo |
| East Loan, Winfields With Boundary Walls And Gateways | | | | 55°57′34″N 2°58′47″W | Category B | 43944 | Upload Photo |
| Kirk Street, Prestongrange Church, Church Of Scotland | | | | 55°57′36″N 2°58′53″W | Category A | 40320 | Upload another image See more images |
| Preston, Preston Tower | | | | 55°57′21″N 2°58′41″W | Category A | 17530 | Upload another image |
| Preston, Preston Cross | | | | 55°57′20″N 2°58′34″W | Category A | 17533 | Upload another image See more images |
| Prestongrange House, North Lodge (Burn's Yard), Including Boundary Walls | | | | 55°57′15″N 2°59′57″W | Category C(S) | 17538 | Upload Photo |
| Drummore House Boundary Wall And Gatepiers To East Lodge Entrance | | | | 55°56′57″N 3°00′24″W | Category C(S) | 47012 | Upload Photo |
| West Loan, Public Library With Gatepiers, Gates And Walls | | | | 55°57′31″N 2°58′57″W | Category B | 43951 | Upload Photo |
| High Street, Old West Burial Ground | | | | 55°57′29″N 2°59′16″W | Category B | 40325 | Upload another image See more images |
| Drummore House, Including Boundary Wall, And Well | | | | 55°56′53″N 3°00′43″W | Category B | 17552 | Upload Photo |
| Preston, Northfield House, Including Boundary Walls, Gates, Gatepiers And Corner Bartizan | | | | 55°57′16″N 2°58′47″W | Category A | 17560 | Upload another image See more images |
| Prestongrange House, South Lodge And Gate Arch | | | | 55°56′59″N 2°59′43″W | Category C(S) | 47023 | Upload Photo |
| East Loan, Rose Cottage With Boundary Wall | | | | 55°57′36″N 2°58′46″W | Category C(S) | 43943 | Upload another image |
| West Loan, Grange Church, St Andrews Episcopal Church With Boundary Walls | | | | 55°57′31″N 2°59′00″W | Category C(S) | 43950 | Upload Photo |
| West Loan, Former Grange Manse With Gatepiers Gate And Boundary Walls | | | | 55°57′24″N 2°58′49″W | Category B | 40321 | Upload Photo |
| 227 High Street, The Gothenburg (Formerly Forth Tavern) | | | | 55°57′27″N 2°59′26″W | Category B | 40324 | Upload another image See more images |
| Preston, Preston Road, Athelstane Lodge, Including Ancillary Structures And Boundary Walls | | | | 55°57′18″N 2°58′35″W | Category B | 19660 | Upload Photo |
| Prestongrange Colliery, Hoffman Kiln | | | | 55°57′04″N 3°00′32″W | Category B | 47020 | Upload Photo |
| High Street, Town Hall | | | | 55°57′32″N 2°59′08″W | Category C(S) | 43945 | Upload another image See more images |
| Kirk Wynd, Thomas Alexander's Monument | | | | 55°57′37″N 2°58′56″W | Category C(S) | 43948 | Upload another image See more images |
| Preston, Station Road, Preston Lodge, Including Boundary Walls And Gatepeirs | | | | 55°57′17″N 2°58′39″W | Category B | 40326 | Upload Photo |
| Preston, Preston Tower Dovecot | | | | 55°57′24″N 2°58′43″W | Category B | 17531 | Upload another image |
| Dolphingstone Dovecot | | | | 55°56′38″N 2°59′29″W | Category A | 17553 | Upload another image |
| Preston, Polwarth Playing Field Pavilion | | | | 55°57′19″N 2°58′29″W | Category C(S) | 47013 | Upload Photo |

== Key ==
The scheme for classifying buildings in Scotland is:

- Category A: "buildings of national or international importance, either architectural or historic; or fine, little-altered examples of some particular period, style or building type."
- Category B: "buildings of regional or more than local importance; or major examples of some particular period, style or building type, which may have been altered."
- Category C: "buildings of local importance; lesser examples of any period, style, or building type, as originally constructed or moderately altered; and simple traditional buildings which group well with other listed buildings."

In March 2016 there were 47,288 listed buildings in Scotland. Of these, 8% were Category A, and 50% were Category B, with the remaining 42% being Category C.

== See also ==
- List of listed buildings in East Lothian
