= List of listed buildings in Edinburgh/26 =

This is a list of listed buildings in Edinburgh, Scotland.

== List ==
Name	Location	Date listed	Grid ref. (Note: Sometimes known as OSGB36, the grid reference (where provided) is based on the British national grid reference system used by the Ordnance Survey. • "Guide to National Grid". Ordnance Survey. • "Get-a-map". Ordnance Survey.)	Geo-coordinates	Notes	LB number (Note: Historic Environment Scotland assign a unique alphanumeric identifier to each designated site in Scotland, for listed buildings this always begins with "LB", for example "LB12345".)	Image
76-78 Buchleuch Street				55°56′31″N 3°11′03″W	Category B	28400	Upload another image
16 And 18 Calton Hill Including Railings And Boundary Walls				55°57′16″N 3°11′09″W	Category B	28407	Upload Photo
46 And 48 Candlemaker Row				55°56′50″N 3°11′31″W	Category B	28417	Upload Photo
14 And 16 Blacket Place, Including Boundary Walls				55°56′14″N 3°10′28″W	Category B	28311	Upload Photo
18 Blacket Place, Including Boundary Wall				55°56′14″N 3°10′29″W	Category B	28312	Upload Photo
2-4 (Even Nos) New Skinner's Close (Former Skinner's Hall) Including 3 And 4 South Gray's Close				55°56′59″N 3°11′07″W	Category A	28325	Upload Photo
50 Blackfriars Street				55°56′57″N 3°11′10″W	Category B	28327	Upload Photo
4 Barnshot Road With Boundary Wall And Gate				55°54′21″N 3°15′25″W	Category C(S)	28270	Upload Photo
15 Blacket Avenue, Including Boundary Walls And Pedestrian Gateway				55°56′14″N 3°10′19″W	Category B	28296	Upload Photo
Abbey Strand, Western Building, 'Thompson's Court'				55°57′10″N 3°10′27″W	Category A	28208	Upload another image
3, 3B Albany Street, Including Railings				55°57′24″N 3°11′34″W	Category A	28218	Upload Photo
Stenhouse Mill(House) Stenhouse Mill Lane And Crescent				55°55′46″N 3°15′20″W	Category A	28125	Upload another image See more images
Nether Liberton, 7 Old Mill Lane, Old Mill Cottage And Outbuildings				55°55′28″N 3°09′55″W	Category C(S)	28194	Upload Photo
Craig House (Old) Off Craighouse Road, Napier University				55°55′22″N 3°13′35″W	Category A	28046	Upload Photo
Craigroyston House Marine Drive				55°58′44″N 3°15′21″W	Category B	28048	Upload Photo
Drylaw House Off Groathill Road North				55°57′52″N 3°15′11″W	Category A	28060	Upload Photo
Duddingston House (105 Milton Road West), Former Stables And Office (115-127 (Odd Numbers) Milton Road West)				55°56′21″N 3°08′13″W	Category A	28065	Upload another image See more images
32 Manor Place Easter Coates House, (Formerly Old Coates House), Including Walls To N				55°56′56″N 3°13′00″W	Category A	28070	Upload another image
19 Winton Loan, Morton House Pavilions, Entrance Gateway And Boundary Wall				55°53′50″N 3°11′41″W	Category B	28093	Upload Photo
Muirhouse, 36 Marine Drive				55°58′42″N 3°15′57″W	Category A	28099	Upload Photo
University Of Edinburgh Reid School Of Music Teviot Row				55°56′42″N 3°11′21″W	Category A	27995	Upload another image See more images
Mayfield Road And West Mains Road, University Of Edinburgh, King's Buildings, Grant Institute (Geology)				55°55′26″N 3°10′27″W	Category B	28004	Upload another image See more images
Craigmillar Castle And Dovevot, Craigmillar Castle Road				55°55′32″N 3°08′27″W	Category A	28016	Upload another image
Lauriston Castle Cramond Road South				55°58′16″N 3°16′43″W	Category A	28019	Upload another image
Lauriston Castle-Sundial Cramond Road South				55°58′16″N 3°16′43″W	Category B	28020	Upload Photo
Holyrood Road And Queen's Drive, Holyrood Lodge				55°57′06″N 3°10′23″W	Category B	28023	Upload another image
Holyroodhouse, 28 And 30 Croft-An-Righ (Croft And Righ House) Including Boundary Walls And Gates				55°57′15″N 3°10′17″W	Category A	28029	Upload another image
122 Corstorphine Road, Beechwood House (Murrayfield Hospital), Including 112-114 (Even Nos), Boundary Wall, Section Of Garden Wall And Out-Building, Corstorphine Road				55°56′38″N 3°15′52″W	Category A	28031	Upload another image
31-33 (Inclusive Nos) Water Street				55°58′30″N 3°10′10″W	Category B	27917	Upload Photo
Meadows Park - Middle Meadow Walk Gatepiers				55°56′43″N 3°11′28″W	Category B	27928	Upload another image
Rosebank Cemetery, Pilrig Street				55°58′03″N 3°11′07″W	Category C(S)	27935	Upload another image See more images
Saughton Public Park, Rose Garden, Sundial				55°56′04″N 3°14′56″W	Category C(S)	27936	Upload another image
Redford Road, Old Bridge				55°54′18″N 3°14′25″W	Category B	27944	Upload Photo
Warriston Road Railway Bridge Carrying Railway Over Warriston Road				55°57′56″N 3°11′56″W	Category B	27954	Upload Photo
555 Castlehill, Former Reservoir, With Retaining Wall, Steps, Railings And Balustrade To N And Drinking Fountain On W Wall				55°56′57″N 3°11′46″W	Category B	27962	Upload another image
Donaldson's School For The Deaf 54 Henderson Row				55°57′39″N 3°12′23″W	Category B	27972	Upload Photo
Lauriston Place, George Heriot's School, Science Block				55°56′48″N 3°11′43″W	Category B	27979	Upload Photo
19 And 21 Pilrig Street With Boundary Walls And Railings				55°57′54″N 3°10′46″W	Category B	27850	Upload Photo
27 Pilrig Street With Boundary Walls And Railings				55°57′55″N 3°10′46″W	Category B	27853	Upload Photo
Edinburgh Castle Esplanade, Statue Of Earl Haig				55°56′56″N 3°11′50″W	Category B	27860	Upload another image See more images
Princes Street Gardens, Royal Scots Greys Monument				55°57′05″N 3°11′58″W	Category B	27872	Upload another image See more images
St Andrew Place, Leith Academy Primary School, Former Leith Academy, And Gatepiers				55°58′14″N 3°10′07″W	Category B	27877	Upload Photo
St Andrew Place, St Andrew's UP Church (Formerly Secession)				55°58′14″N 3°10′09″W	Category B	27878	Upload Photo
Shore, Police Box				55°55′51″N 3°12′52″W	Category B	27882	Upload Photo
58 Shore				55°58′31″N 3°10′13″W	Category B	27894	Upload Photo
George Iv Bridge, Greyfriars Bobby Fountain				55°56′49″N 3°11′29″W	Category A	27899	Upload another image See more images
50, 51 Timberbush				55°58′35″N 3°10′07″W	Category C(S)	27906	Upload Photo
St George's Well, Off St Bernard's Bridge				55°57′13″N 3°12′44″W	Category B	27907	Upload another image
306 Leith Walk With Boundary Wall				55°57′55″N 3°10′37″W	Category C(S)	27739	Upload Photo
5 Windsor Place				55°57′07″N 3°06′47″W	Category C(S)	27799	Upload Photo
27-29 (Inclusive Nos) Maritime Street				55°58′31″N 3°10′04″W	Category B	27804	Upload Photo
Redford Road, Covenanters' Monument				55°54′17″N 3°14′19″W	Category B	27809	Upload another image
35-45 (Odd Nos) Windsor Place				55°57′04″N 3°06′48″W	Category B	27814	Upload Photo
Calton Hill, Off Regent Road, Nelson's Monument				55°57′15″N 3°10′58″W	Category A	27823	Upload another image
20 And 22 Leith Walk And 3 Cassel's Lane With Boundary Walls And Railings				55°58′13″N 3°10′21″W	Category B	27663	Upload Photo
59-63 George Iv Bridge, Lothian Chambers, Including Boundary Balustrade				55°56′57″N 3°11′32″W	Category B	27674	Upload another image
42 Leith Walk With Boundary Walls And Railings				55°58′12″N 3°10′22″W	Category B	27677	Upload Photo
1 The Mound, National Gallery Of Scotland With Railings				55°57′03″N 3°11′44″W	Category A	27679	Upload another image See more images
52 Leith Walk With Boundary Walls And Railings				55°58′11″N 3°10′23″W	Category B	27682	Upload Photo
Ratho Village, Baird Road, War Memorial				55°55′27″N 3°22′48″W	Category B	27690	Upload Photo
9 Rosefield Place				55°57′07″N 3°07′04″W	Category C(S)	27696	Upload Photo
80-90 (Even Nos) Leith Walk				55°58′09″N 3°10′24″W	Category B	27697	Upload Photo
Parliament Square, Parliament Hall				55°56′56″N 3°11′27″W	Category A	27704	Upload another image See more images
214 Leith Walk With Railings				55°58′01″N 3°10′31″W	Category C(S)	27707	Upload Photo
11 Tipperlinn Road With Boundary Wall, Gates And Railings				55°55′49″N 3°12′56″W	Category B	27708	Upload Photo
276, 278 Leith Walk And 1, 3 Balfour Street				55°57′56″N 3°10′35″W	Category C(S)	27722	Upload Photo
Ratho Village, Main Street, Lodge To The Lodge And Gatepiers				55°55′20″N 3°22′41″W	Category C(S)	27733	Upload Photo
163 Canongate, Canongate Tolbooth				55°57′06″N 3°10′48″W	Category A	27582	Upload another image
Leith Docks, Albert Dock With Swing Bridge				55°58′45″N 3°09′55″W	Category B	27590	Upload Photo
20-26 (Even Nos) Morningside Road				55°56′00″N 3°12′38″W	Category C(S)	27591	Upload Photo
26 Regent Street				55°57′11″N 3°06′44″W	Category C(S)	27605	Upload Photo
Newliston House, Sundial				55°56′43″N 3°25′36″W	Category B	27623	Upload Photo
Newmills Road, Gowanhill Farm				55°53′55″N 3°20′38″W	Category C(S)	27632	Upload Photo
Leith Docks, Prince Of Wales Dry Dock, Hydraulic Station				55°58′46″N 3°10′07″W	Category B	27634	Upload Photo
Leith Walk And Pilrig Street, Pilrig Dalmeny Church And Halls (C Of S)				55°57′50″N 3°10′41″W	Category A	27649	Upload Photo
18 (Formerly 18 And 19) Jordan Lane				55°55′38″N 3°12′19″W	Category C(S)	27502	Upload Photo
The King's Hall, (Formerly St Paul's Newington Church Of Scotland) 41A South Clerk Street				55°56′26″N 3°10′49″W	Category B	27504	Upload another image
294-300 (Even Nos) Portobello High Street				55°57′06″N 3°06′33″W	Category C(S)	27511	Upload Photo
73-81 (Odd Nos) Henderson Street				55°58′29″N 3°10′20″W	Category C(S)	27521	Upload Photo
11 Morningside Place With Boundary Walls And Gatepiers				55°55′50″N 3°12′44″W	Category B	27531	Upload Photo
Kirkliston Village, Queensferry Road/Main Street, War Memorial				55°57′23″N 3°24′06″W	Category B	27538	Upload Photo
12 And 12A John's Place				55°58′19″N 3°10′04″W	Category B	27555	Upload Photo
7 Hampton Terrace, National Bible Society Of Scotland Building (Formerly Roseburn Free Church, Latterly Wester Coates Parish Church)				55°56′44″N 3°13′46″W	Category C(S)	27557	Upload Photo
Long Dalmahoy Road, Hagg's Farm With Steading				55°53′36″N 3°23′02″W	Category C(S)	27558	Upload Photo
67 And 69 Morningside				55°55′53″N 3°12′35″W	Category C(S)	27566	Upload Photo
69B Morningside Road, Napier University Morningside Campus (Former Morningside Parish Church) With Boundary Walls, Gatepiers And Railings				55°55′52″N 3°12′34″W	Category B	27571	Upload Photo
51 Regent Street				55°57′14″N 3°06′37″W	Category C(S)	27573	Upload Photo
8 And 10 Regent Street				55°57′10″N 3°06′45″W	Category C(S)	27579	Upload Photo
West Bowling Green Street, Bridge				55°58′22″N 3°10′47″W	Category B	27456	Upload Photo
13 Bellevue Crescent, St Mary's Church (Church Of Scotland), Including Railings				55°57′37″N 3°11′37″W	Category A	27461	Upload another image
1-5 (Odd Nos) Great Junction Street, 2 And 4 Leith Walk And 2, 4 Kirk Street				55°58′14″N 3°10′21″W	Category B	27464	Upload Photo
11 Jordan Lane				55°55′38″N 3°12′24″W	Category C(S)	27470	Upload Photo
12 Jordan Lane				55°55′38″N 3°12′23″W	Category C(S)	27474	Upload Photo
16 Jordan Lane				55°55′38″N 3°12′21″W	Category B	27493	Upload Photo
Heriot-Watt University, Riccarton Estate, South Strip, Gatepiers				55°54′19″N 3°19′03″W	Category B	27376	Upload Photo
37 Spylaw Road, Craigard				55°55′55″N 3°13′12″W	Category B	27397	Upload another image
3 And 3A South Fort Street And 95 Ferry Road With Steps And Railings; EH6 4DL				55°58′29″N 3°10′59″W	Category B	27402	Upload Photo
71-77 (Odd Nos) Duke Street				55°58′11″N 3°10′08″W	Category B	27412	Upload Photo
Hermitage Of Braid, Off Braid Road, Dovecot With Wall				55°55′12″N 3°12′15″W	Category B	27413	Upload another image
Humbie Dovecot				55°57′56″N 3°25′08″W	Category C(S)	27416	Upload Photo
Humbie Farmhouse				55°57′48″N 3°25′10″W	Category C(S)	27422	Upload Photo
16 South Fort Street (The Village Inn) And 1-3 (Odd Nos) Trafalgar Lane				55°58′27″N 3°11′00″W	Category C(S)	27428	Upload Photo
16 Hermitage Drive, Drumearn, With Boundary Walls And Gatepiers				55°55′13″N 3°12′18″W	Category B	27433	Upload Photo
143 Grange Loan Astley Ainslie Hospital, St Roque With Garden Fountain And Dragon Bench				55°55′47″N 3°11′44″W	Category B	27324	Upload Photo
Oa Johnston Terrace, St Columba's (Free) Church, With Railings				55°56′56″N 3°11′39″W	Category B	27325	Upload another image
21 And 22 (1F & 2F) Portland Place And 1 (1-9) Portland Street With Steps And Railings; EH6 6LA And EH6 4SX Respectively				55°58′41″N 3°10′52″W	Category B	27326	Upload Photo
Harvest Road, Hillwood House With Former Coach House And Stables				55°56′04″N 3°23′26″W	Category C(S)	27327	Upload Photo
8-12 (Even Nos) North Fort Street With Front Walls; EH6 4EX				55°58′30″N 3°11′01″W	Category C(S)	27235	Upload Photo
8 Glasgow Road, Middle Norton				55°56′16″N 3°22′06″W	Category C(S)	27252	Upload Photo
25 Falcon Gardens, St Peter's Primary School				55°55′47″N 3°12′16″W	Category C(S)	27265	Upload Photo
5 Napier Road With Boundary Wall And Gatepiers				55°56′00″N 3°13′03″W	Category B	27270	Upload Photo
Gogar Station Road, Gogar Bank House, North Lodge				55°55′30″N 3°19′22″W	Category C(S)	27285	Upload Photo
90-102(Even Nos) Inchview Terrace, Portobello Road, Former Wm Ramsay Technical Institute With Gatepiers, Gates And Railings				55°57′26″N 3°07′28″W	Category A	27288	Upload Photo
Mansfield Road, Harmeny House, (Now School)				55°52′40″N 3°20′03″W	Category B	27181	Upload Photo
31 And 33 Pittville Street				55°57′08″N 3°06′23″W	Category C(S)	27188	Upload Photo
Glasgow Road, Norton House Hotel, Railway Bridge				55°56′04″N 3°22′33″W	Category B	27196	Upload Photo
Glasgow Road, Norton House Hotel, Former Stables, The Norton Tavern				55°56′01″N 3°23′09″W	Category B	27205	Upload Photo
3 And 4 East Brighton Crescent				55°57′02″N 3°06′54″W	Category B	27209	Upload Photo
91 And 93 Constitution Street				55°58′23″N 3°10′04″W	Category C(S)	27210	Upload Photo
Gilmore Place Viewforth Church With Boundary Walls Gatepiers And Railings				55°56′23″N 3°12′45″W	Category B	27104	Upload another image
41 Cowgate, Magdalene Chapel				55°56′53″N 3°11′33″W	Category A	27110	Upload another image
26 And 28 Brighton Place				55°57′07″N 3°06′59″W	Category B	27116	Upload Photo
6 Casselbank Street				55°58′13″N 3°10′27″W	Category B	27133	Upload Photo
63-69 (Odd Nos) Madeira Street With Garden Walls And Railings; EH6 4AX				55°58′35″N 3°11′00″W	Category C(S)	27142	Upload Photo
Greyfriars Place, Greyfriars Church (Church Of Scotland)				55°56′48″N 3°11′32″W	Category A	27018	Upload another image
3 Ettrick Road				55°56′00″N 3°13′09″W	Category B	27033	Upload Photo
Catchpell House, Carpet Lane (Adjoining Donaldson's Warehouse)				55°58′33″N 3°10′08″W	Category C(S)	27068	Upload Photo
47, 49, 51-53 Milton Road East, Queen's Bay Lodge (Eventide Home) And Outbuilding				55°56′42″N 3°05′48″W	Category B	27083	Upload Photo
3, 5 And 7 Lochend Road With Boundary Wall And Railings				55°58′08″N 3°09′59″W	Category C(S)	26943	Upload Photo
54 Canaan Lane, Woodburn House				55°55′39″N 3°12′08″W	Category B	26948	Upload another image
12-16 (Even Nos) Smith's Place				55°58′01″N 3°10′25″W	Category B	26970	Upload Photo
Dalmahoy Estate, North Lodge				55°54′29″N 3°22′05″W	Category C(S)	26976	Upload Photo
17 And 19 John Street				55°57′07″N 3°06′15″W	Category C(S)	26977	Upload Photo
16 Prospect Bank Road, Prospect Bank House, With Boundary Wall And Railings				55°58′05″N 3°09′16″W	Category B	26979	Upload Photo
Ladycroft Cottage And Boundary Wall				55°53′04″N 3°20′17″W	Category C(S)	26980	Upload Photo
221 Ferry Road, Victoria Park Hotel With Boundary Walls; EH6 4NN				55°58′24″N 3°11′29″W	Category C(S)	26986	Upload Photo
13A Murrayfield Avenue, Church Of The Good Shepherd (Scottish Episcopal Church)				55°56′50″N 3°14′12″W	Category B	26995	Upload another image See more images
223 (G1, 1F1, 1F2, 1F3 & 1F4) Ferry Road, Agra Lodge, With Boundary Wall, Gatepiers And Gates; EH6 4SP				55°58′23″N 3°11′35″W	Category B	26998	Upload Photo
Bonnington Bond, Bonnington Road, 15-21 Breadalbane Street And Anderson Place				55°58′18″N 3°10′53″W	Category B	27016	Upload Photo
26 George Iv Bridge, Frankenstein Pub (Former Elim Pentecostal Church)				55°56′50″N 3°11′30″W	Category B	26862	Upload another image
49-57 Bernard Street				55°58′34″N 3°10′09″W	Category B	26872	Upload Photo
Dell Road, St Cuthbert's Parish Church (Church Of Scotland) And Churchyard With Boundary Wall, Offertory House, And Gates				55°54′32″N 3°15′22″W	Category B	26874	Upload another image See more images
Commercial Wharf, 3, 4, And 5/1-31 (Inclusive Nos) The Cooperage; EH6 6LF				55°58′34″N 3°10′15″W	Category B	26878	Upload Photo
Haymarket, Heart Of Midlothian War Memorial				55°56′47″N 3°12′59″W	Category C(S)	26889	Upload another image See more images
1 John Street And 2 Abercorn Terrace With Boundary Walls				55°57′03″N 3°06′18″W	Category B	26904	Upload Photo
82-84 Even Nos Slateford Road				55°56′00″N 3°14′09″W	Category B	26795	Upload Photo
Buccleuch And Greyfriars Church (Free Church) West Crosscauseway				55°56′39″N 3°11′05″W	Category B	26798	Upload Photo
Ashley House, Walled Garden With Pavilion And Stores				55°55′38″N 3°21′31″W	Category B	26801	Upload Photo
Glenbrook Road, The Boathouse With Gatepiers				55°52′50″N 3°21′42″W	Category C(S)	26805	Upload Photo
Birdsmill Railway Viaduct, River Almond (Off M8)				55°55′35″N 3°25′44″W	Category B	26813	Upload another image

== Key ==
The scheme for classifying buildings in Scotland is:

- Category A: "buildings of national or international importance, either architectural or historic; or fine, little-altered examples of some particular period, style or building type."
- Category B: "buildings of regional or more than local importance; or major examples of some particular period, style or building type, which may have been altered."
- Category C: "buildings of local importance; lesser examples of any period, style, or building type, as originally constructed or moderately altered; and simple traditional buildings which group well with other listed buildings."

In March 2016 there were 47,288 listed buildings in Scotland. Of these, 8% were Category A, and 50% were Category B, with the remaining 42% being Category C.

== See also ==
- List of listed buildings in Edinburgh
