= James Mylne (poet) =

Scottish poet and landowner

James Mylne (1737–1788) was a Scottish poet and laird of Lochill near Prestonpans, Haddingtonshire. A collection of his writing, "Poems, consisting of Miscellaneous Pieces and two Tragedies," was published by his son George after his death. Among the contents of the collection was an invitation to Robert Burns to visit him on his estate. The two tragedies of the collection are 'The British Kings,' regarding Arthurian Britain, and 'Darthula,' regarding prehistoric Ulster.

Mylne was born on 4 June 1737 at Suttie Barns near Haddingtonshire. He died on 9 December 1788.
