= Hotel Indigo Edinburgh =

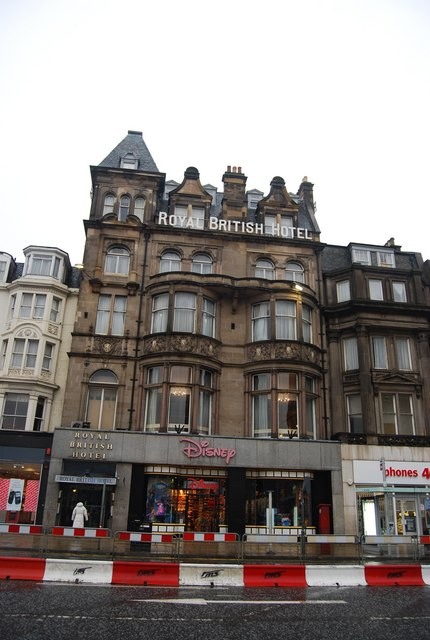
- The view of the Hotel Indigo Edinburgh from across Princes Street
- Interactive map of the Hotel Indigo Edinburgh area
- Former names: Royal British Hotel

General information
- Status: Completed
- Type: Hotel
- Architectural style: Victorian
- Location: 20 Princes Street; EH2 2AN, Edinburgh, Scotland
- Coordinates: 55.95325°N 3.1909°W
- Construction started: 1896
- Completed: 1898
- Opened: 1899
- Owner: Hotel Indigo

Technical details
- Material: red Peterhead granite Sicilian marble stone from Prudham quarries, Northumberland

Design and construction
- Architect: James Macintyre Henry

Other information
- Number of rooms: 64
- Number of restaurants: 1 (Twenty Princes Street)
- Number of bars: 1
- Public transit: St Andrew Square; Edinburgh Waverley

Website
- Official website

Listed Building – Category B
- Official name: 19 and 20 Princes Street, incorporating the Royal British Hotel
- Designated: 20 February 1985
- Reference no.: LB29502

Hotel Indigo Edinburgh is a hotel on Princes Street, Edinburgh. In 2016 it became part of the Hotel Indigo chain.
