= Lothian Chambers =

County building in Edinburgh, Scotland

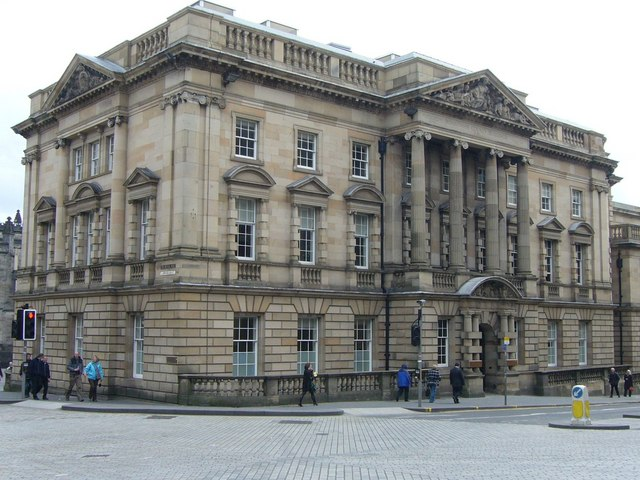
- Lothian Chambers

- Shown in Edinburgh
- 55.9492°N 3.1922°W
- Location: George IV Bridge, Edinburgh

History
- Built: 1904

Site notes
- Architect: James Macintyre Henry
- Architectural style: Palladian style

Listed Building – Category B
- Official name: Midlothian County Buildings, George IV Bridge, Edinburgh
- Designated: 14 December 1970
- Reference no.: LB27674

Lothian Chambers, formerly Midlothian County Buildings, is a municipal structure on George IV Bridge in Edinburgh, Scotland. The structure, which accommodates the Consulate-General of France and the French Institute for Scotland, is a Category B listed building.

== History ==
Following the implementation of the Local Government (Scotland) Act 1889, which established county councils in every county, it became necessary to find offices for Midlothian County Council. The new county council initially occupied the old county hall which had been built to a design by Archibald Elliot in 1816. However, the building had become dilapidated and the new county leaders decided to demolish the old building and to commission a new structure on the same site.

The new building was designed by James Macintyre Henry in the Palladian style, built in ashlar stone and was completed in 1904. The design involved a symmetrical main frontage with nine bays facing onto George IV Bridge; the central section of three bays, which projected forward, featured a doorway on the ground floor flanked by pairs of banded Doric order columns supporting an entablature with triglyphs and a segmental pediment. On the first floor, there was a tetrastyle portico formed by Ionic order columns supporting an entablature inscribed with the words "Midlothian County Buildings" and a pediment with fine carvings in the tympanum. The outer bays were fenestrated with sash windows which were augmented by voussoirs on the ground floor and by pediments on the first floor. At roof level, there was a balustrade. Internally, the principal room was a marble-floored assembly hall on the first floor.

An ornate frieze, designed by William Birnie Rhind and depicting the mining, agriculture and fishing industries, was installed high up on the rear elevation of the building which faced St Giles' Cathedral. An extension, which was connected to the main building by a tunnel, was designed by Sir Robert Matthew of Robert Matthew Johnson Marshall in the modernist style and erected on the opposite side of George IV Bridge in 1968.

Following the abolition of the county council, the building became the offices and meeting place of Lothian Regional Council in 1975. After the introduction of unitary authorities in 1996, the building became the responsibility of City of Edinburgh Council and was used for committee meetings of the new Scottish Parliament from 1999 until the new Scottish Parliament Building was opened in October 2004. It then became the local Registrar's Office as well as an approved venue for weddings and civil partnership ceremonies in 2007. Following a review in 2017, Edinburgh City Council decided that the building was surplus to requirements and, in 2018, the local Registrar's Office relocated to new premises at 253 High Street. The French Consulate-General and the French Institute for Scotland then relocated from their former premises in Randolph Crescent into Lothian Chambers.

== See also ==
- List of listed buildings in Edinburgh/26
