= Prestonpans Town Hall =

Municipal building in Prestonpans, Scotland

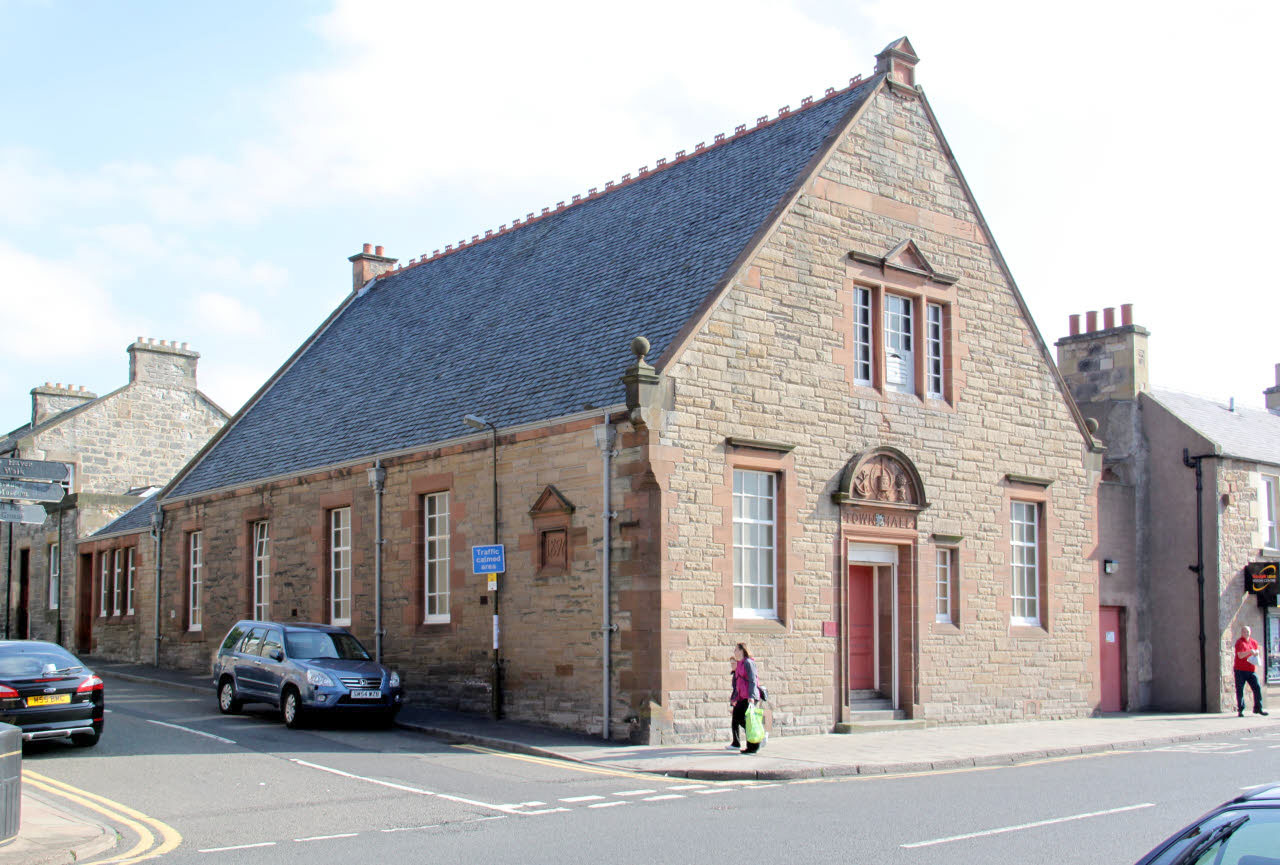
- Prestonpans Town Hall

- Shown in East Lothian
- 55.9589°N 2.9855°W
- Location: High Street, Prestonpans

History
- Built: 1897

Site notes
- Architect: Peter Whitecross
- Architectural style: Renaissance Revival style

Listed Building – Category C(S)
- Official name: High Street, Town Hall
- Designated: 20 March 1997
- Reference no.: LB43945

Prestonpans Town Hall is a municipal building on the High Street of Prestonpans, East Lothian, Scotland. The building, which is largely used as a community events venue, is a Category C listed building.

== History ==
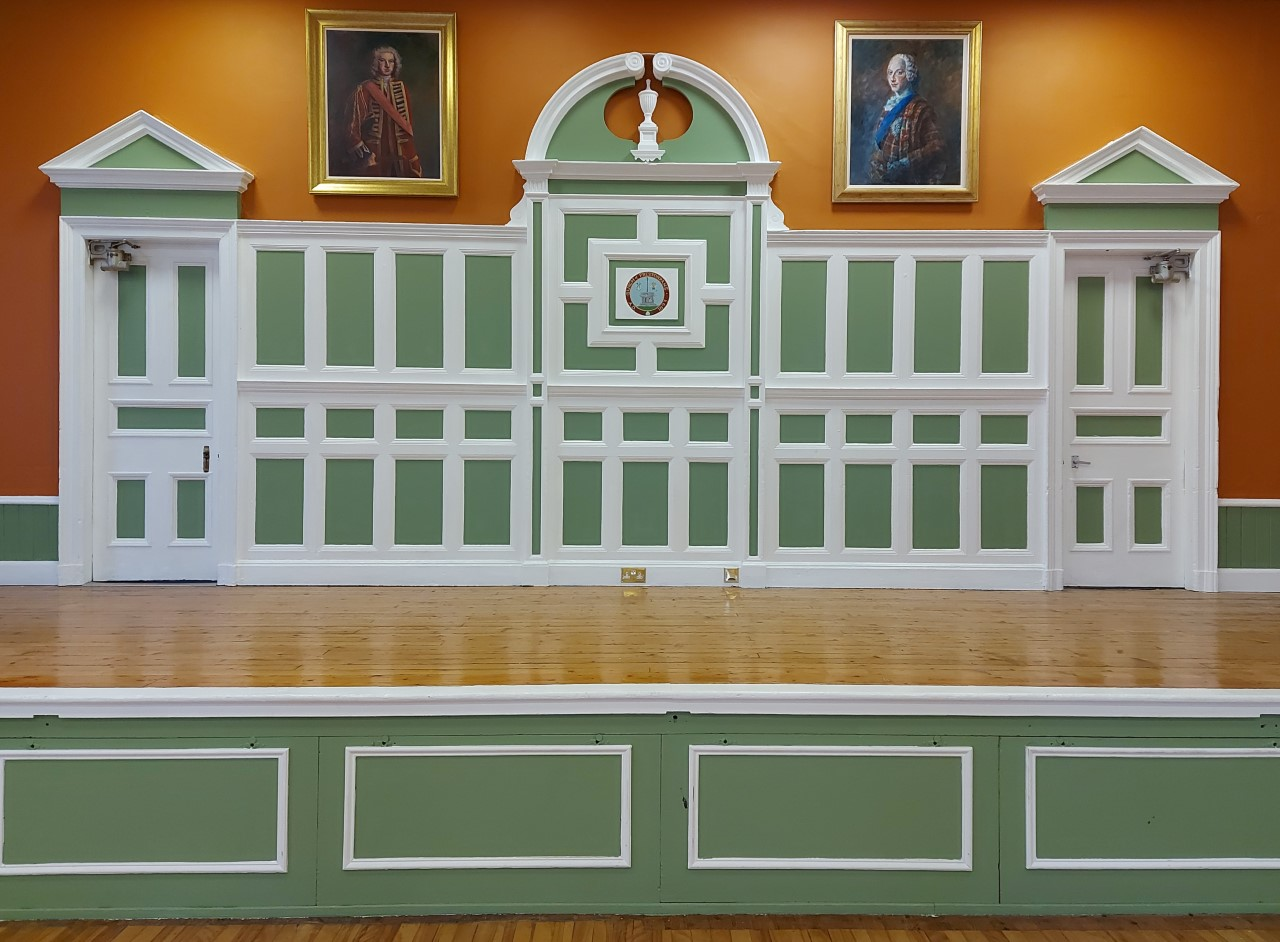
Prestonpans Town Hall interior, following renovations in 2021.

Following significant population growth, largely associated with the fishing, salt panning and coal mining industries, Prestonpans became a burgh in 1862. In 1875, the new burgh leaders decided to procure a meeting place for civic events: The site they selected was open ground on the south side of the High Street. The new building, financed by public subscription, was designed by a local architect, Peter Whitecross, in Renaissance Revival style. It was built in red sandstone by Cooper and Son of Musselburgh, at a cost of £1,500, and was officially opened by Haddingtonshire member of parliament Richard Haldane on 9 August 1897. The guests at the ceremony included Colonel Thomas Cadell of the 2nd Bengal Fusiliers, who had been awarded the Victoria Cross for his actions as a junior officer during the Indian Rebellion.

The design involved a symmetrical main frontage with three bays facing onto the High Street; the central bay featured an off-centre doorway with a stone architrave supporting a frieze inscribed with the words "Town Hall" and a segmental pediment with a coat of arms in the tympanum. The doorway was flanked by a sash window to the left and by a small window and, beyond that, by a sash window to the right. The gable above contained a three-light mullioned window with a small pediment. The building extended south along New Street with the first of the five bays containing a carved date stone. Internally, the principal room was the main hall.

In the mid-20th century the building was extended to the west, enclosing the lane that previously existed there, and to the south, establishing additional facilities. It was used exclusively as an events venue with the burgh council officers and their departments based in the Town Chambers.

In April, 2021, the Battle of Prestonpans (1745) Heritage Trust acquired a five-year lease over the building from the East Lothian Council with the objective of renovating it and preparing it as museum space, to commemorate the Battle of Prestonpans, a battle in which Jacobite forces, led by the Stuart exile and pretender to the throne, Charles Edward Stuart, defeated a government army under the command of Sir John Cope, just to the south of Prestonpans on 21 September 1745. Following an extensive programme of renovation works to the main hall, which was carried out in summer 2021, the building re-opened with a conference on Jacobite themes. It became the site of the Prestonpans Jacobite Museum in April 2023.

== See also ==
- List of listed buildings in Prestonpans, East Lothian
