= Lothian =

Region of the Scottish Lowlands

Coordinates: 55°54′33″N 3°05′04″W

- Country: Scotland

Area
  - Total: 1,720 km^{2} (666 sq mi)

Population (2014)
  - Total: 858,090
  - Density: 497/km^{2} (1,288/sq mi)

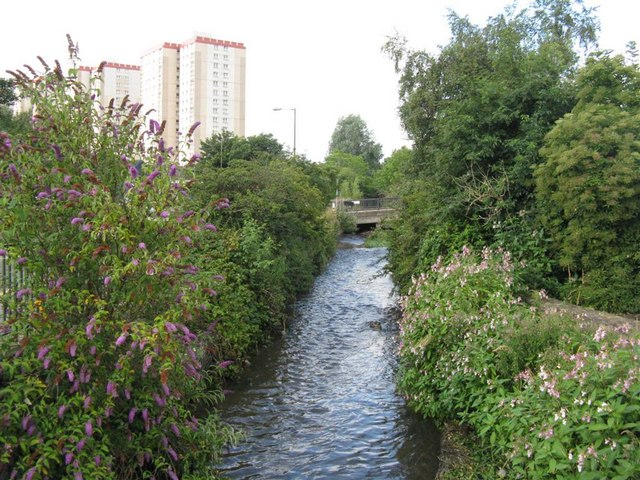
The Lothian (Burdiehouse) Burn as it passes through Edinburgh

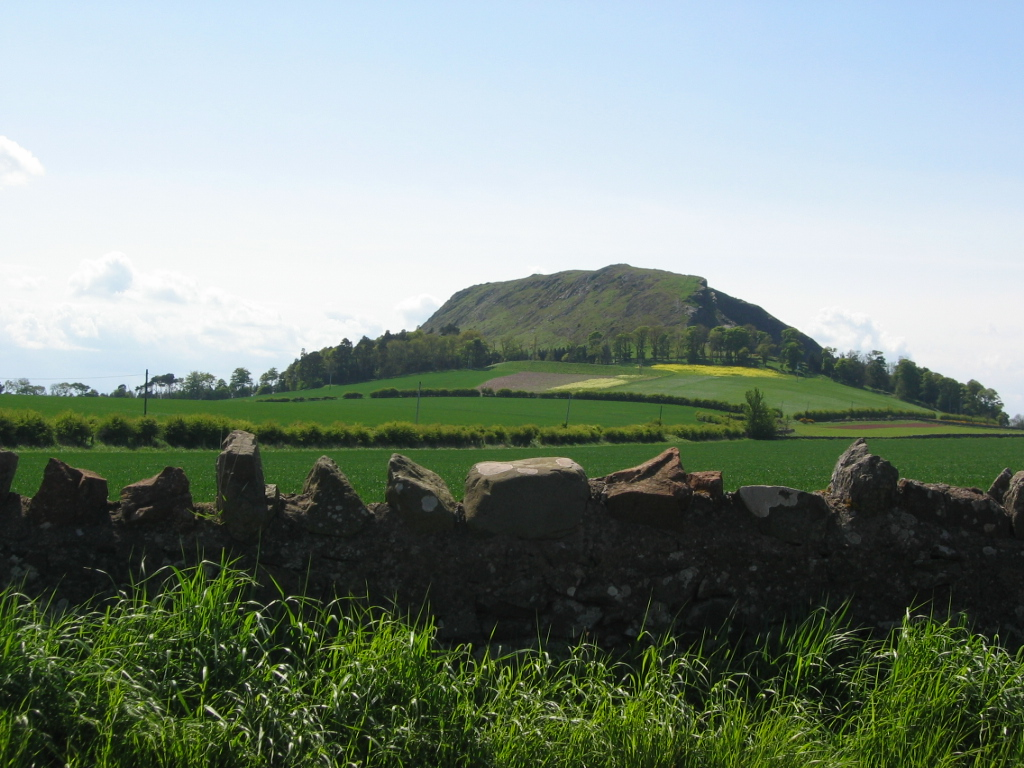
Traprain Law in East Lothian, said to be the site of King Lot's capital

Lothian (/ˈloʊðiən/; Scots: Lowden, Loudan, -en, -o(u)n; Scottish Gaelic: Lodainn [ˈl̪ˠot̪aɲ]) is a region of the Scottish Lowlands, lying between the southern shore of the Firth of Forth and the Lammermuir Hills and the Moorfoot Hills. The principal settlement is the Scottish capital, Edinburgh, while other significant towns include Livingston, Linlithgow, Bathgate, Queensferry, Dalkeith, Bonnyrigg, Penicuik, Musselburgh, Prestonpans, Tranent, North Berwick, Dunbar and Haddington.

Historically, the term Lothian referred to a province encompassing most of what is now southeastern Scotland. In the 7th century it came under the control of the Anglian kingdom of Bernicia, the northern part of the later kingdom of Northumbria, but the Angles' grip on Lothian was weakened following the Battle of Nechtansmere in which they were defeated by the Picts.

Subsequent Scottish history saw the region subdivided into three counties—Midlothian, East Lothian, and West Lothian—leading to the popular designation of "the Lothians".

== Etymology ==
The origin of the name is debated. It perhaps comes from the British *Lugudūniānā (Lleuddiniawn in Modern Welsh spelling), meaning "country of the fort of Lugus", the latter being a Celtic god. Alternatively, it may take its name from a watercourse that flows through the region, now known as the Lothian Burn, (Note: Also known as the Burdiehouse, Niddrie, or Brunstane Burn as it passes through those neighbourhoods.) the name of which comes from either the British lutna meaning "dark or muddy stream," (Note: In contrast to the nearby Peffer Burn, the name of which comes from pefr, 'clear stream'.) *lǭd, with a meaning associated with flooding (cf. Leeds, London), or lǖch, meaning "bright, shining."

A popular legend is that the name comes from King Lot, who is king of Lothian in the Arthurian legend. The usual Latin form of the name is Laudonia.

== Anglian settlement ==
Lothian was settled by Angles at an early stage and formed part of the Kingdom of Bernicia, which extended south into present-day Northumberland and Durham. Many place names in the Lothians and Scottish Borders demonstrate that the English language became firmly established in the region from the 6th century onwards. In due course, Bernicia united with Deira to form the Kingdom of Northumbria. Important Anglo-Saxon structural remains have been found in Aberlady along with various artefacts such as an early 9th-century Anglo-Saxon coin.

Little is recorded of Lothian's history specifically at this time. After the Norse-speaking Viking Great Army conquered southern Northumbria (including areas that would later become Yorkshire), northern Northumbria – centred on the former Anglian kingdom of Bernicia – was cut off from the other Anglo-Saxon kingdoms. How much Norse influence spread north of the River Tees is uncertain. Bernicia continued as a distinct territory, sometimes described as having a king, at other times an ealdorman (earl). Bernicia became distinct from other English territories at this time due to its links with the other Christian kingdoms in what is present-day Scotland and seems to have little to do with the Norse-controlled areas to the south. Roger of Wendover wrote that Edgar, King of the English granted Laudian to Kenneth II, King of Scots in 973 on condition that he come to court whenever the English king or his successors wore his crown. It is widely accepted by medieval historians that this marks the point at which Lothian became part of Scotland. Despite this transaction, the control of Lothian was not finally settled and the region was taken by the Scots at the Battle of Carham in 1018 and the River Tweed became the de facto Anglo-Scottish border.

William the Conqueror invaded Lothian and crossed over the River Forth but was not able to conquer it. At this time Lothian appears in the Anglo-Saxon Chronicle as Loðen or Loþen. As late as 1091, the Chronicle describes how the Scottish king, Malcolm Canmore, "went with his army out of Scotland into Lothian in England".

== Language ==
In the post-Roman period, Lothian was dominated by British-speakers whose language is generally called Cumbric and was closely related to Welsh. In Welsh tradition Lothian is part of the "Old North" (Hen Ogledd). Reminders exist in British place-names like Tranent, Linlithgow and Penicuik.

During the Anglo-Saxon period, the Northumbrian dialect of Old English came to be spoken in the region. Initially confined to Lothian and the Borders, the language would grow, change, and spread across the lowlands of Scotland, becoming the Scots language. The dialects of the modern Lothians are usually considered to be part of Central Scots. Place names in the Lothians of Anglian origin include Ingliston.

Although one of the few areas of mainland Scotland where the Gaelic language was never dominant, the presence of some Gaelic place-names, e.g. Dalry, Currie, Balerno and Cockenzie, has been attributed to the "temporary occupation...[and] the presence of a landowning Gaelic-speaking aristocracy and their followers for something like 150–200 years."

== Governance ==
Arms of the Lothian Regional Council

By 1305, the area of Lothian had been divided into three shires (the area controlled by a sheriff), called the shires of Edinburgh (or Edinburghshire), Haddington (or Haddingtonshire), and Linlithgow (or Linlithgowshire). Each of these three counties had an informal alternative name referencing their position within the former province of Lothian: Edinburghshire was also known as Midlothian, Haddingtonshire as East Lothian, and Linlithgowshire as West Lothian. The city of Edinburgh was made a county of itself in 1482, making it administratively independent from the surrounding county of Edinburghshire.

The three Lothian counties were all legally renamed during the 20th century, with Haddingtonshire becoming East Lothian in 1921, Linlithgowshire becoming West Lothian in 1925, and Edinburghshire becoming Midlothian in 1947.

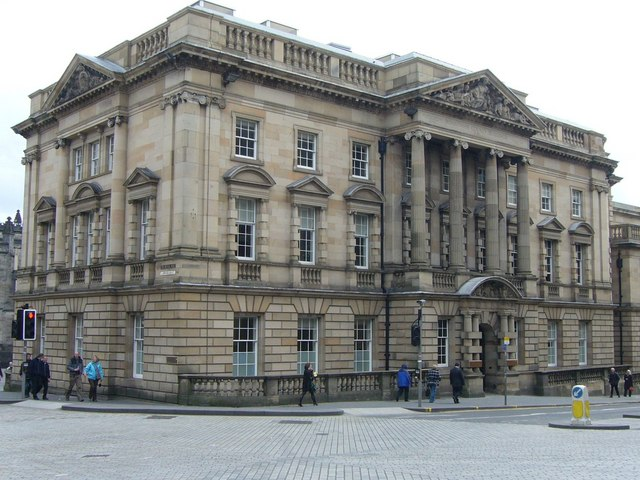
Lothian Chambers, Edinburgh: headquarters of Lothian Regional Council 1975–1996

In 1975 the old county councils and burgh corporations were abolished under the Local Government (Scotland) Act 1973, being replaced with regions and districts. Lothian Regional Council formally took over responsibility from the old county councils in May 1975. The Lothian region was split into four districts: East Lothian, Edinburgh, Midlothian, and West Lothian. Each district was broadly based on the areas of the pre-1975 counties and city, but with some notable alterations. The Lothian Regional Council was responsible for education, social work, water, sewerage, and transport (including local buses within Edinburgh). The regional council was based at Lothian Chambers on King George IV Bridge in Edinburgh, which had been built in 1904 as the headquarters of the old Midlothian County Council.

Lothian Regional Council was abolished in 1996 under the Local Government etc. (Scotland) Act 1994. The region's four districts took over all local government functions as unitary council areas.

=== Political control ===
The first election to the Lothian Regional Council was held in 1974, initially operating as a shadow authority alongside the outgoing authorities until the new system came into force on 16 May 1975. Political control of the council from 1975 until its abolition in 1996 was as follows:

Political control of council
Party in control	Years
No overall control	1975–1978
Labour	1978–1982
No overall control	1982–1986
Labour	1986–1996

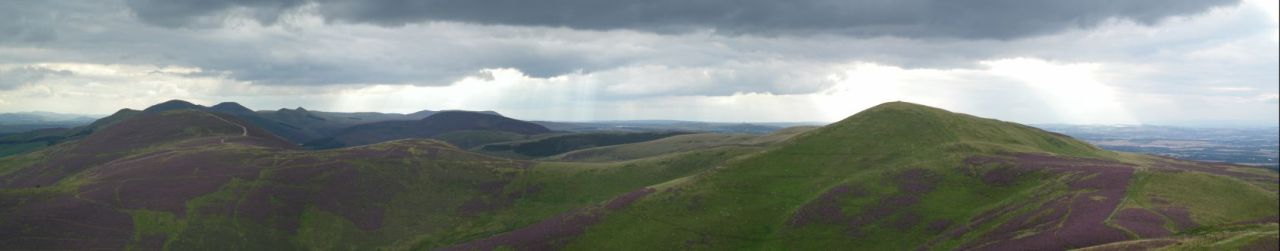
The Pentland Hills in rural Lothian
