= Institut français du Royaume-Uni =

French cultural institute in the United Kingdom

Coordinates: 51.4946°N 0.177°W

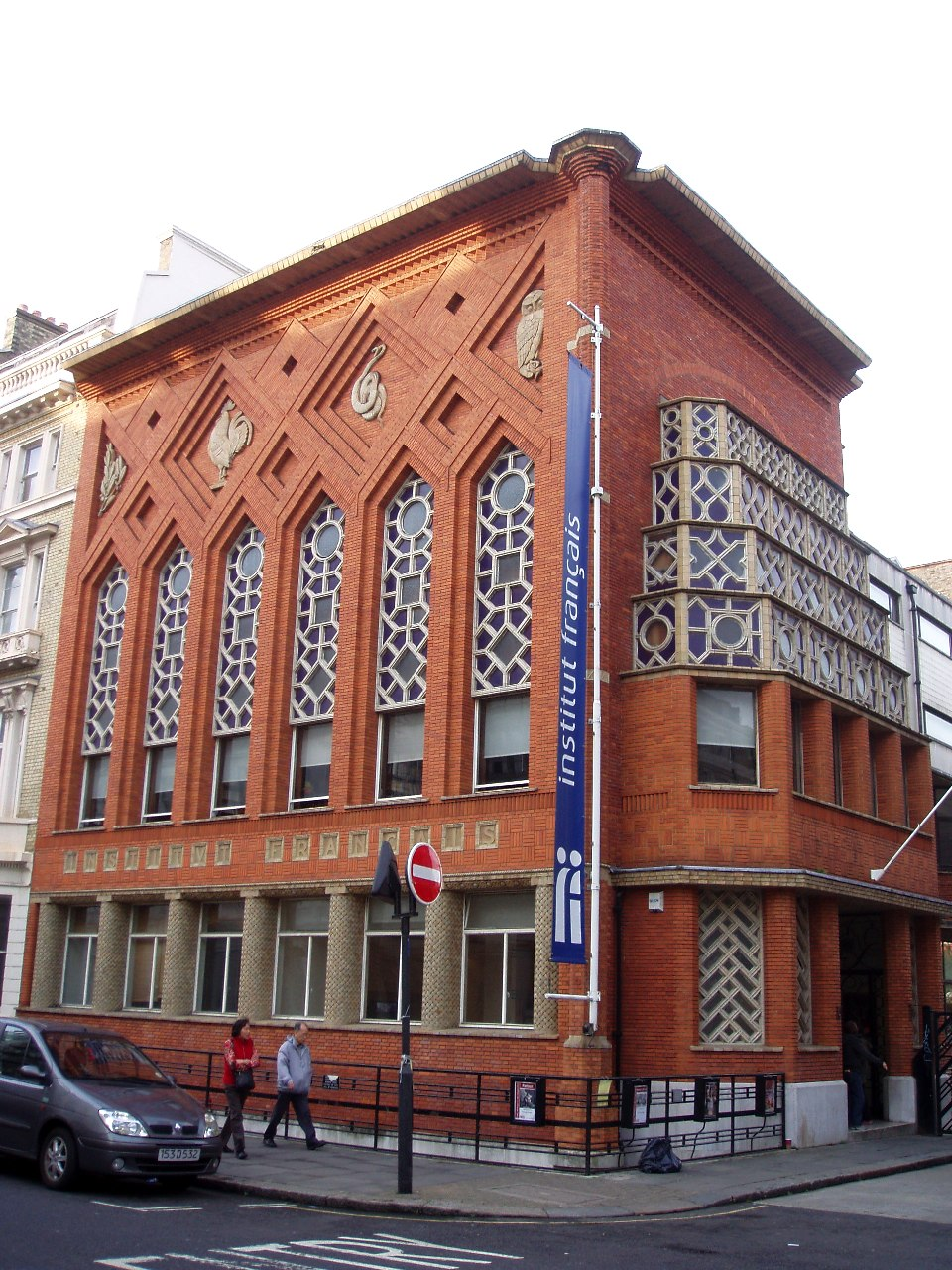
The Institut français building in Queensberry Place, London

The Institut français du Royaume-Uni is a branch of the Institut français, which represents and promotes French learning and culture in the United Kingdom. It is situated in London's South Kensington at Queensberry Place, a turning off Cromwell Road, facing the Natural History Museum.

Founded in 1910, as The Université des Lettres française the Institut Français has branches in London and Edinburgh (See: French Institute for Scotland).

"Marie d'Orliac, who had become Marie Bohn on her marriage, directed the Institute and the school from 1910 to 1920."

The London branch includes the Ciné Lumière cinema, and a library which includes the Bibliothèque Quentin Blake for children's books. It is a Grade II listed building.
