= French Institute for Scotland =

Cultural centre in City of Edinburgh, Scotland

Coordinates: 55.95233°N 3.21231°W

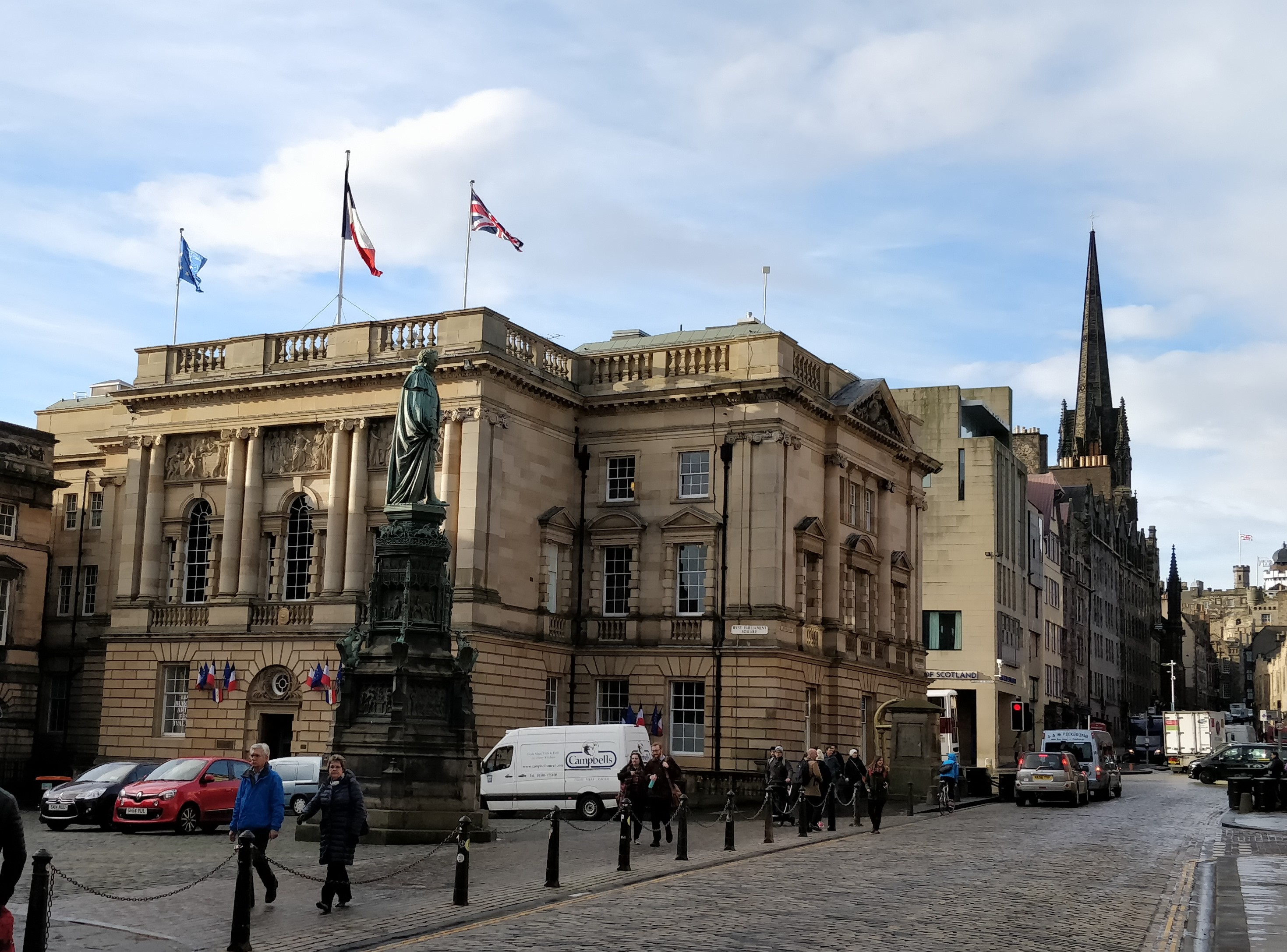
Lothian Chambers, the new home of the French Consulate-General and the French Institute for Scotland on Edinburgh's Royal Mile.

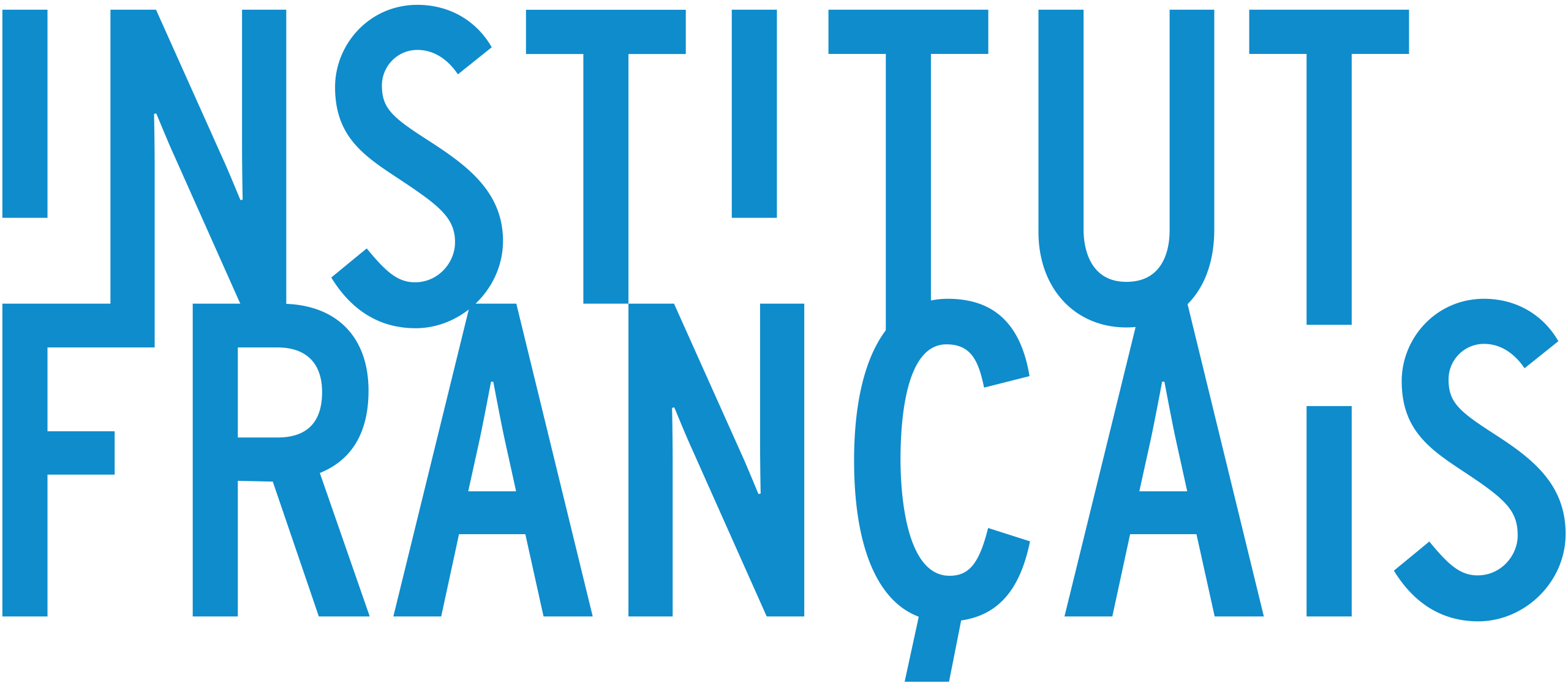
Logo of the Institut Français.

The French Institute (French: Institut français) in Edinburgh is a cultural centre promoting French language and French culture in Edinburgh and in Scotland and part of the wider Institut Français network around the world. It operates alongside the Institut français du Royaume-Uni in London and is administered by the French Foreign Ministry.

It is co-located with Edinburgh's French consulate on the city's Royal Mile. The Institute itself comprises a cultural department, a courses department and a media library. It also hosts the Education officer for Scotland.

== History ==
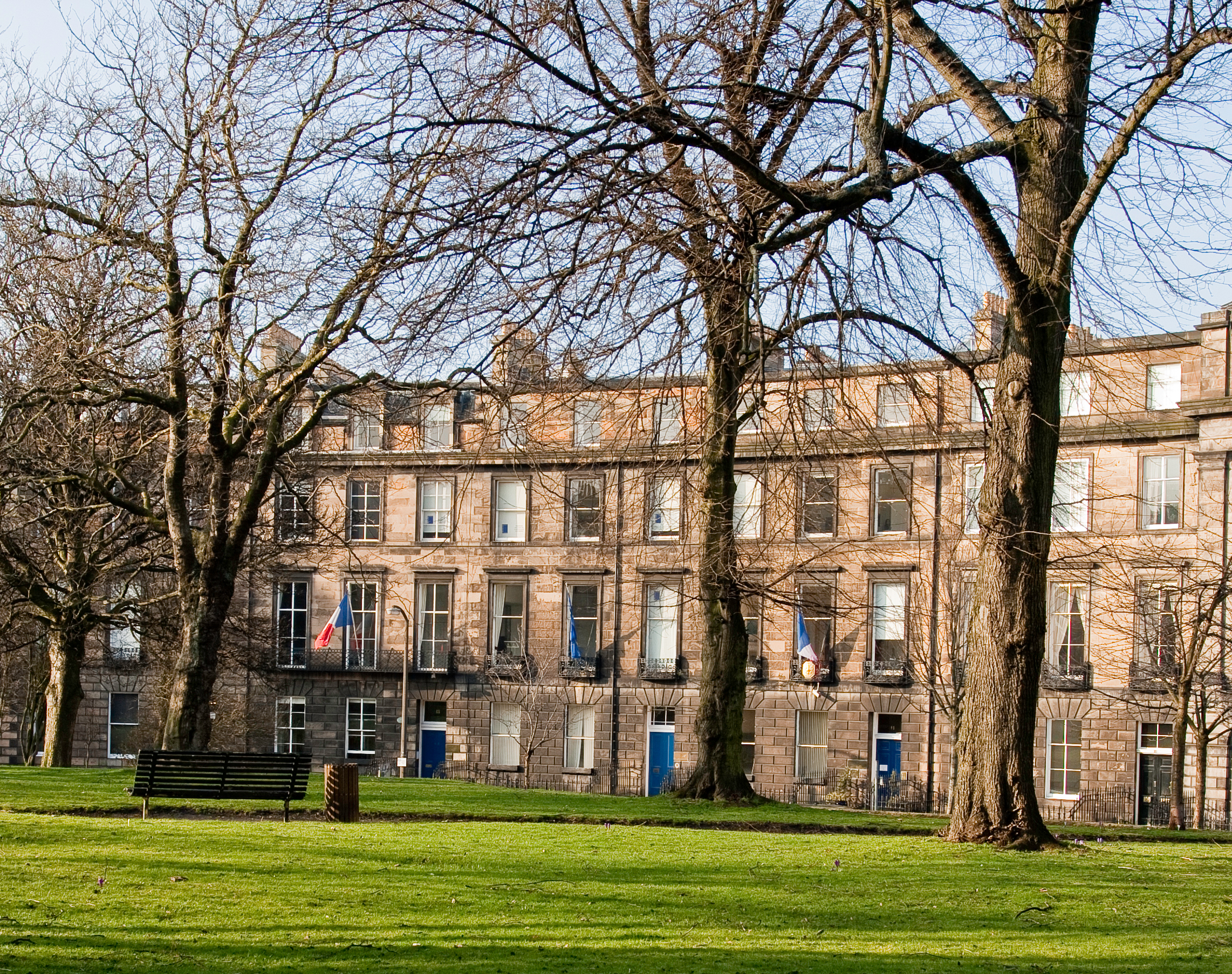
The former location of the Institute in Randolph Crescent

The Auld Alliance, which is the beginning of the friendship between Scotland and France against England was signed in 1295. In 1942, the General de Gaulle said about this alliance it was the "oldest alliance in the world". Founded in 1946 by René Massigli, ambassador of France to the United Kingdom, the French Institute relocated from a row of townhouses in Randolph Crescent in Edinburgh's West End to Lothian Chambers in 2018.

=== Directors of the French Institute for Scotland ===
- 2023 - ... : Stéphane Pailler
- 2019 - 2023 : Laurence Païs
- 2015 - 2019 :
- 2010 - 2015 : Vincent Guérin
- 2008 - 2010 : Vacant
- 2006 - 2008 : Anne Laval
- 2003 - 2006 : Olga Poivre d'Arvor
- 2001 - 2003 : Ashok Adicéam
- 1997 - 2001 : Jean-Marc Terrasse
- 1993 - 1997 : Stéphane Crouzat
- 1987 - 1993 : Alain Bourdon
- 1978 - 1980 : Pierre Alexandre
- 1975 - 1978 : Michel Sciama
- 1970s : Henry Monteagle
- 1966 - 1969 : Georges Prudhomme
- 1960s : René Escande de Messières (c. 1957)

== Activities ==
=== Cultural events ===
In 2011, for the Edinburgh Festival Fringe, the French Institute presented a show, 'Two Johnnies live upstairs', especially created for the building by the French compagny Mythos festival. This show has been selected as one of the highlights of 2011 by The Scotsman. The French Institute is also involved in the Edinburgh cultural life and is a partner of the Cameo, Edinburgh and hosts the office of the French Film festival UK.

==== Cultural events list ====
===== Exhibitions =====
Year	Month	Exhibition's name	Artists, colletives, and partners
2011	January- February	Philippe La Gautrière	Rebel(le)
2011	April	Vive la tapisserie 2 !	Collective STAR
2011	Mai - June	Collection One	The Photographers Collective
2011	June - July	Rennes 1981	Patrice Poch et Gildas Raffenel
2011	July	Bulles, Jazz, Blues 'Quand la BD swingue !'	Produced by Wallonie-Bruxelles International
2011	October	Paris exposé	Students from Stevenson College Edinburgh led by Alan McEwan and Jon Lee

===== Théâtre, cinéma, concerts... =====
Year	Month	Event	Event's name	Artists	Partners
2011	January	Special	Brittany - Scotland year launch		
2011	February	Cinema	Bretons shorts	Vivement lundi !	The Filmhouse
2011	May	Meeting	Breton chefs meet Scottish products	Students from the lycée hotelier (cookery school) of Dinard et Scottish chefs	
2011	June	Cinema	Cinéconcerts : 'From Silent to loud'	Five Bretons bands : Bikini Machine, Olivier Mellano, Laetitia Sheriff, Montgomery, NeirdA & Z3RO	Tentracks
2011	August	Theatre	'Two Johnnies live upstairs'	Mythos (festival)	
2011	November	Concert	'Santa Cruz in Scotland'	Santa Cruz	

=== The Media Library ===
==== Activities ====
The Media Library organises activities for kids in French. L'Oreille Musicale, workshop about French music is new from 2011. On November edition, l'Oreille musicale invited the Breton band Santa Cruz to speak about their musical tastes and influences. The library is open all week days and access is free. By contrast, only the French Institute members can borrow documents.

==== Collection ====
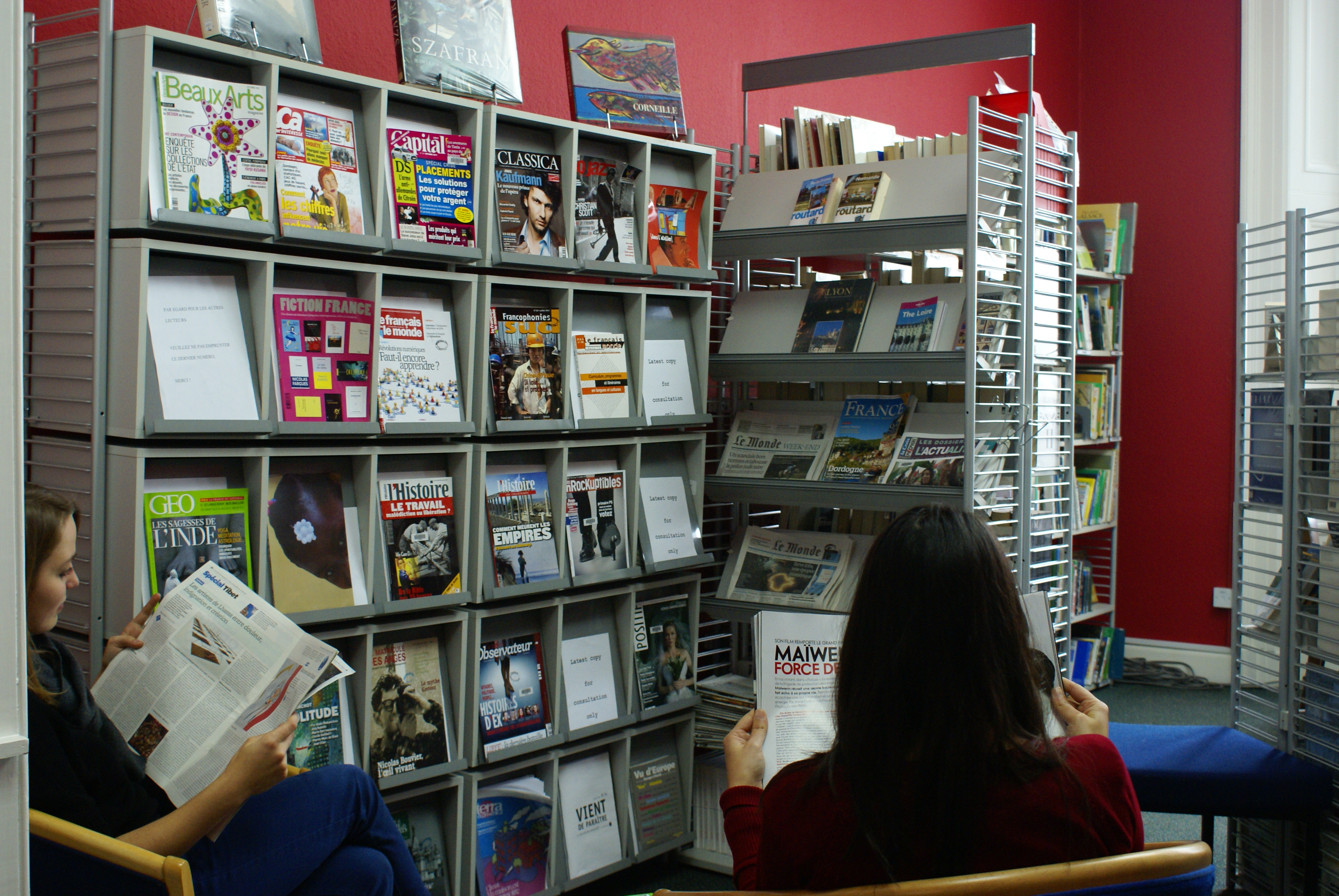
Media Library's newspapers

The media library contains over 10.000 documents, mainly in French, about a lot of different aspects of France and French culture. You can find documents about literature, art, history, geography, humanities and children's literature. A lot of references book are available, like dictionaries, encyclopaedias and travel guides. The novel collection contain many novels by Scottish authors translated in French (e.g. Robert Louis Stevenson, Ian Rankin and Val McDermid).

You can read or borrow newspapers like: Libération, Le Monde, Le Point, general-interest magazines: ELLE, Les Inrockuptibles and more specialised magazines like Beaux-Arts and Positif. The CD & DVD shelves contain 1500 CDs (audio-books and music) and almost 1000 films and documentaries.

=== Language classes ===
Every term, about 500 students come to the Institute to learn French.

== Bibliography ==
- Alan John Steele (professeur à l'Université d'Édimbourg), L'Institut français d'Écosse, cinquante ans d'histoire, 1946–1996, Institut français d'Écosse, 1996, 85 p. (ISBN 978-095296830-6)
- Alan John Steele, 60@ifecosse : 1946-2006, Institut français d'Écosse, 2006, 208 p. (ISBN 978-095296832-0)
