= Prestonpans =

Town in East Lothian, Scotland

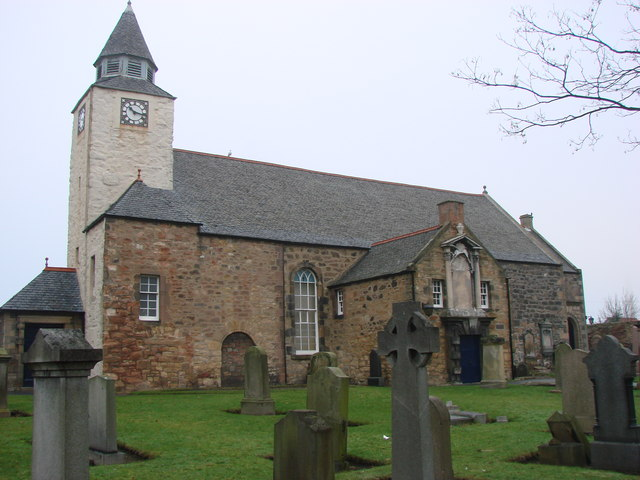
- Prestonpans Old Parish Church

- Location within East Lothian
- Population: 10,460 (2020)
- Demonym: Panner(s)
- OS grid reference: NT401745
- Council area: East Lothian
- Lieutenancy area: East Lothian
- Country: Scotland
- Sovereign state: United Kingdom
- Post town: Prestonpans
- Postcode district: EH32
- Dialling code: 01875
- Police: Scotland
- Fire: Scottish
- Ambulance: Scottish
- UK Parliament: East Lothian
- Scottish Parliament: East Lothian

Prestonpans (/prɛstənˈpænz/ Scottish Gaelic: Baile an t-Sagairt, Scots: The Pans) is a mining town, situated approximately eight miles east of Edinburgh, Scotland, in the council area of East Lothian. The population as of 2020 is 10,460. It is near the site of the 1745 Battle of Prestonpans (first called the Battle of Gladsmuir, then renamed the Battle of Tranent, and later still renamed the Battle of Prestonpans – although evidence shows the battle occurred a few miles outside of town). Prestonpans is famous for its murals, with many such artworks depicting local history.

== History ==
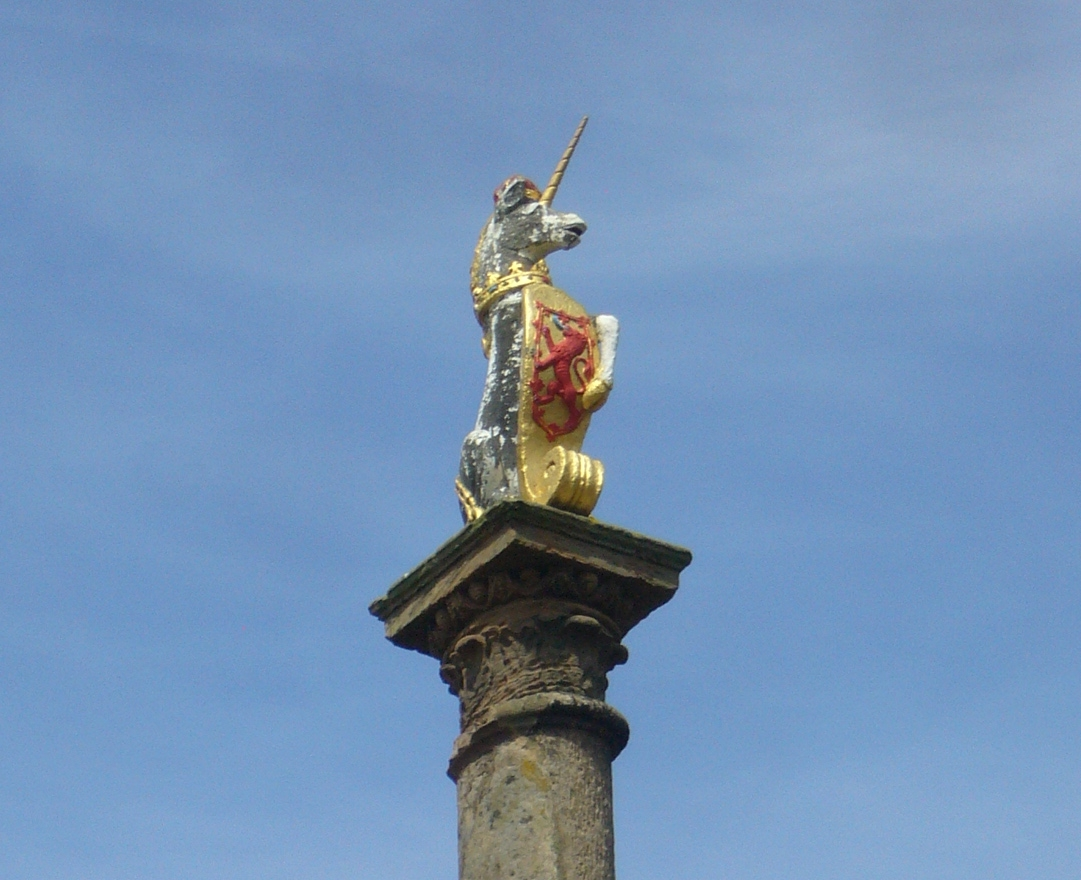
Royal unicorn on Preston Cross

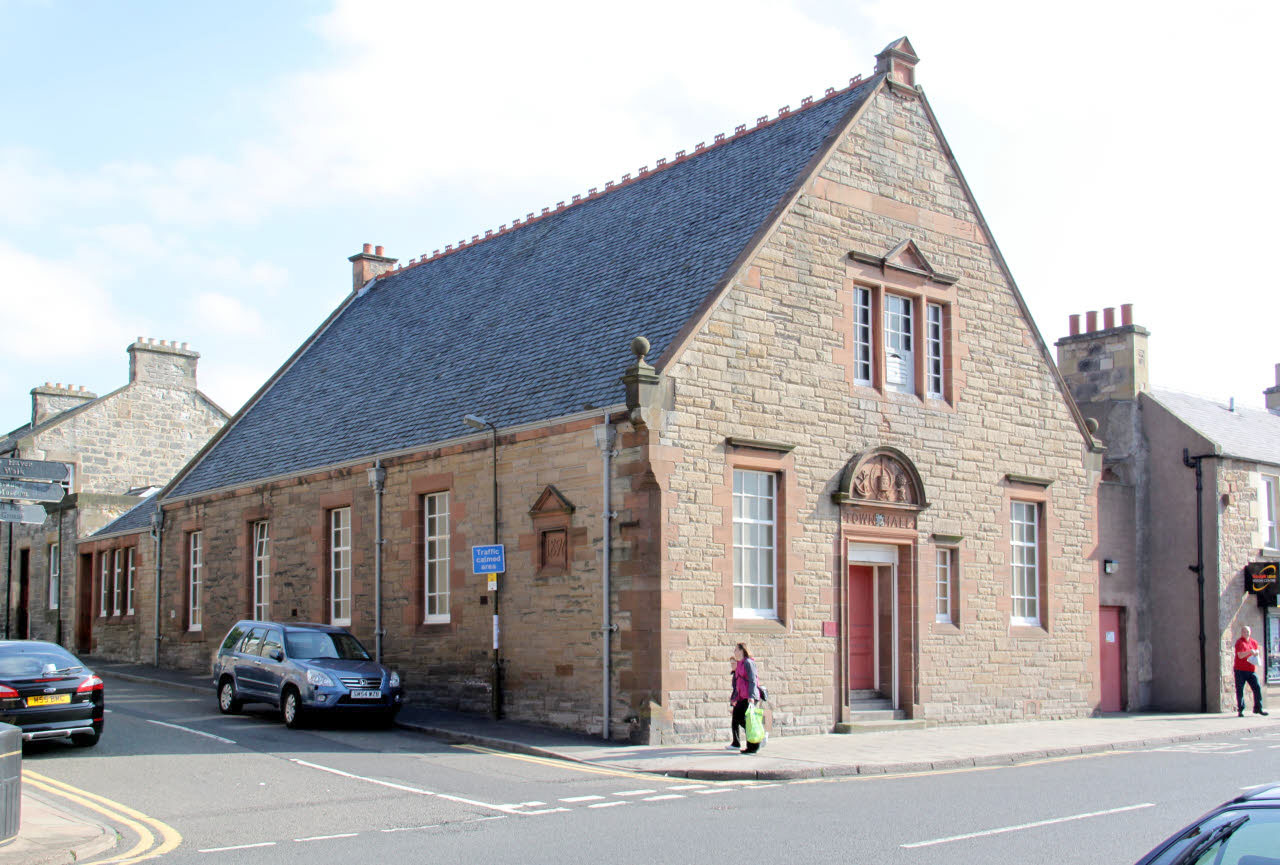
Prestonpans Town Hall

=== Foundation ===
According to legend Prestonpans was founded in the 11th century by a traveller named Althamer, who became shipwrecked on the local beach/coastal area. Finding it impossible to get home, the survivors of the wreck decided to remain where they were and founded a settlement named "Althamer" in honour of their leader. The monks of Newbattle and Holyrood arrived in the district in the 12th century and, by 1198, were undertaking salt manufacturing using pans on the seashore: the settlement, which had been named "Althamer" was renamed "Prestonpans". Preston Tower, an L-plan keep, was built by the Hamilton Family in the mid-15th century.

One of the first post-Reformation churches was built in Prestonpans in 1596, for and at the expense of the new minister, John Davidson. The church was greatly re-modelled in 1774. Ten years after the original building of the new church, Prestonpans became a Parish in its own right, having previously formed part of the Parish of Tranent. Prestonpans Town Hall was completed in 1897.

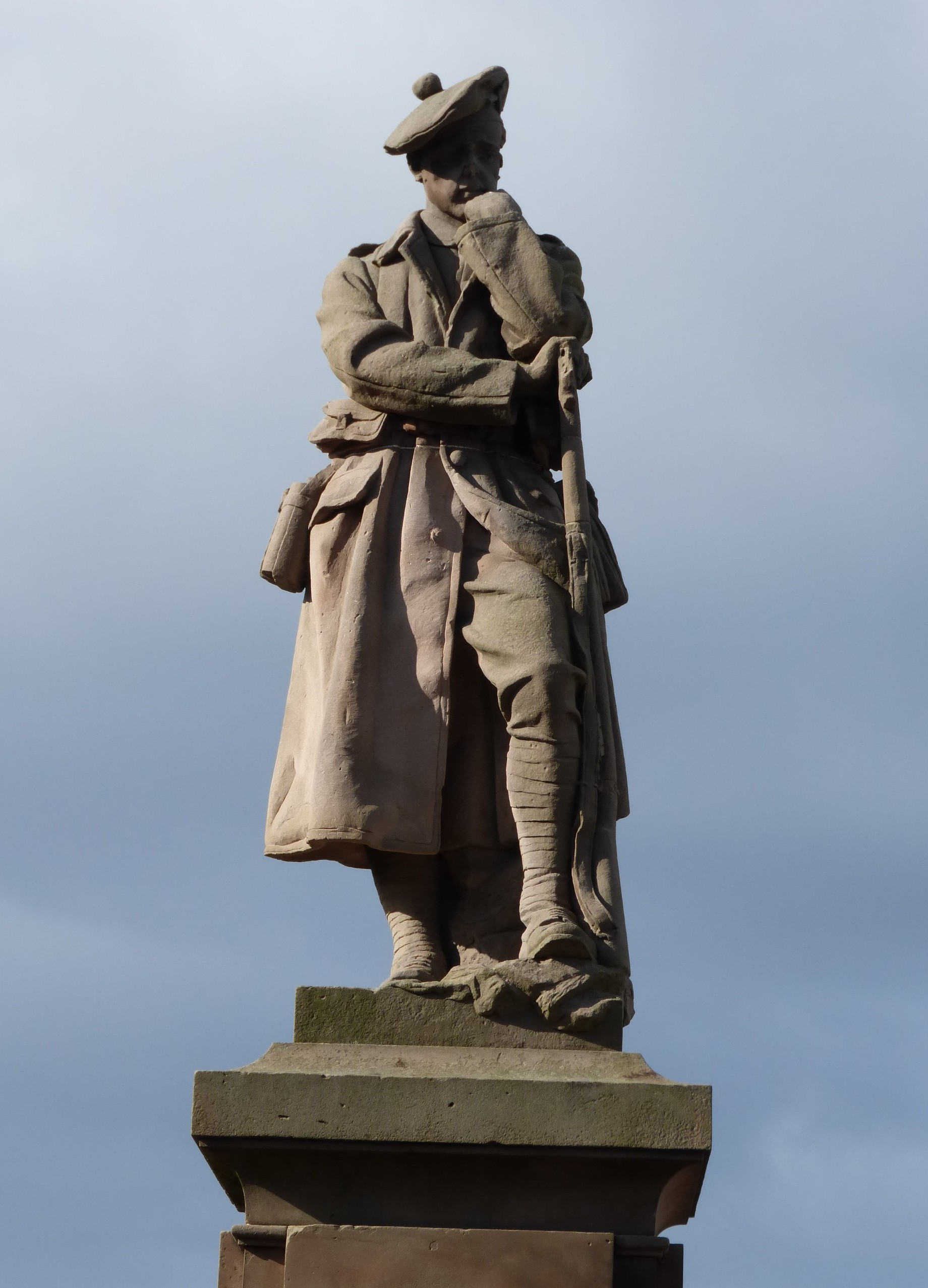
War Memorial statue by Birnie Rhind (1921)

A war memorial, which commemorates the lives of local service personnel who died in the First World War, Second World War and the Spanish Civil War, stands near the town centre but is slightly obscured by the flanking buildings. It takes the form of a Scottish soldier in a Tam o' Shanter bonnet and greatcoat sculpted by William Birnie Rhind in 1921.

=== Industry ===
Salt panning was a very important industry in the early history of Prestonpans. By the beginning of the fifteenth century there were 10 salt works belonging to the town capable of producing between 800 and 900 bushels of salt per week. However, Prestonpans was not a one-industry town, and many other industries flourished in Prestonpans and contributed towards the town's growth. The discovery and mining of coal by the Newbattle monks in the early thirteenth century was arguably the first instance of coal mining in Britain. The mining of coal in Prestonpans began in the year 1210, and continued for centuries.

Prestonpans at one point, had many breweries, all of which have now closed. The oldest brewery in Prestonpans belonged to the Fowler family and was built in 1720. The Fowlers obtained it in 1774 and it was in production into the 20th century. There was also a soap works in the town known as James Mellis and Co.

The town was served, for several hundred years, by the harbour at nearby Prestongrange, known as Morrison's Haven or "Acheson's Haven". Fishing boats sailed from the harbour and herring was the most important catch. The harvesting of oysters was a lucrative industry up to the early twentieth century.The Annual Reports of the Fishery Board for Scotland provide an insight into the decline of fishing in Prestonpans in the years before the First World War.

Fishery Statistics

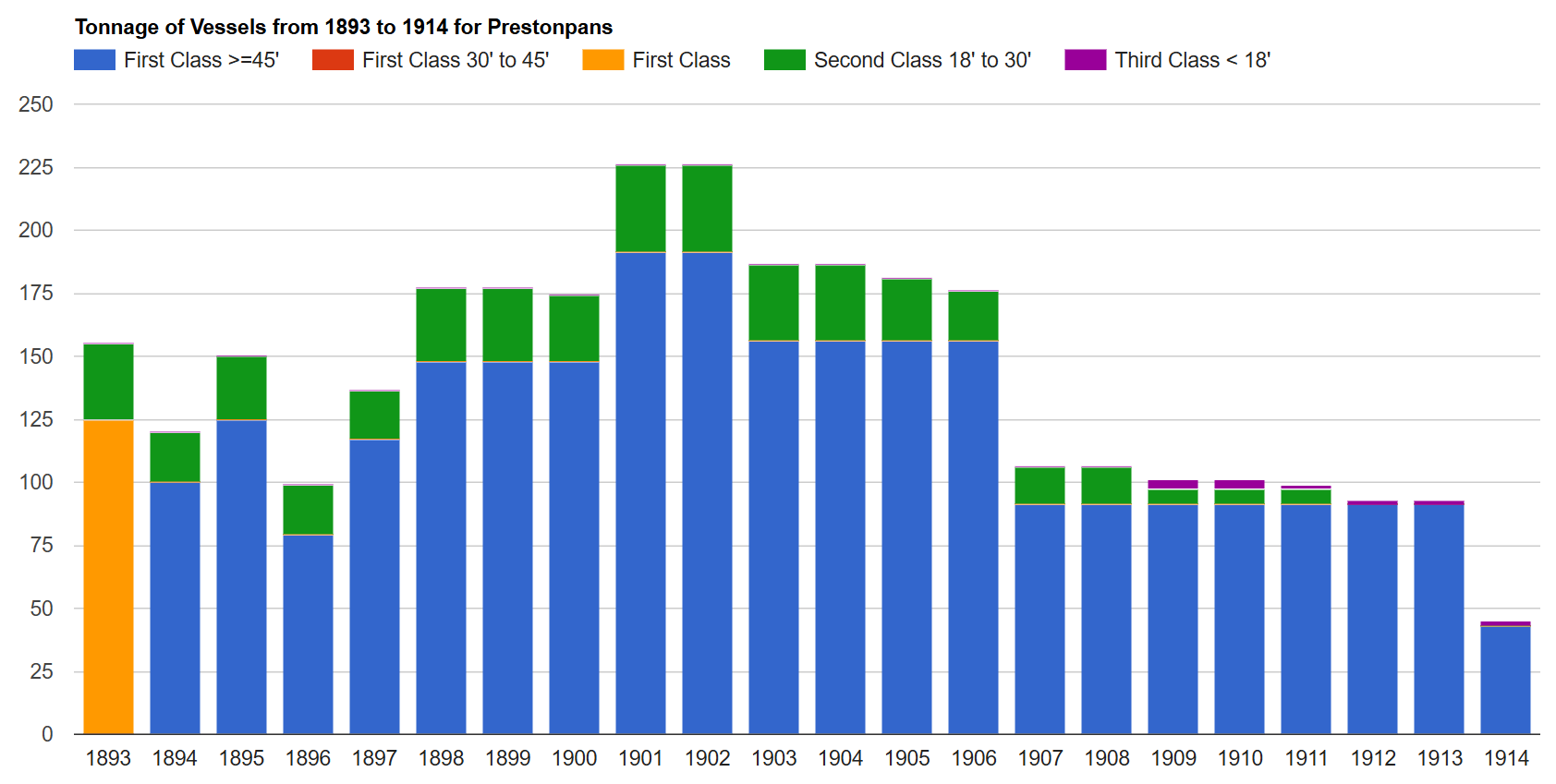
Tonnage of vessels

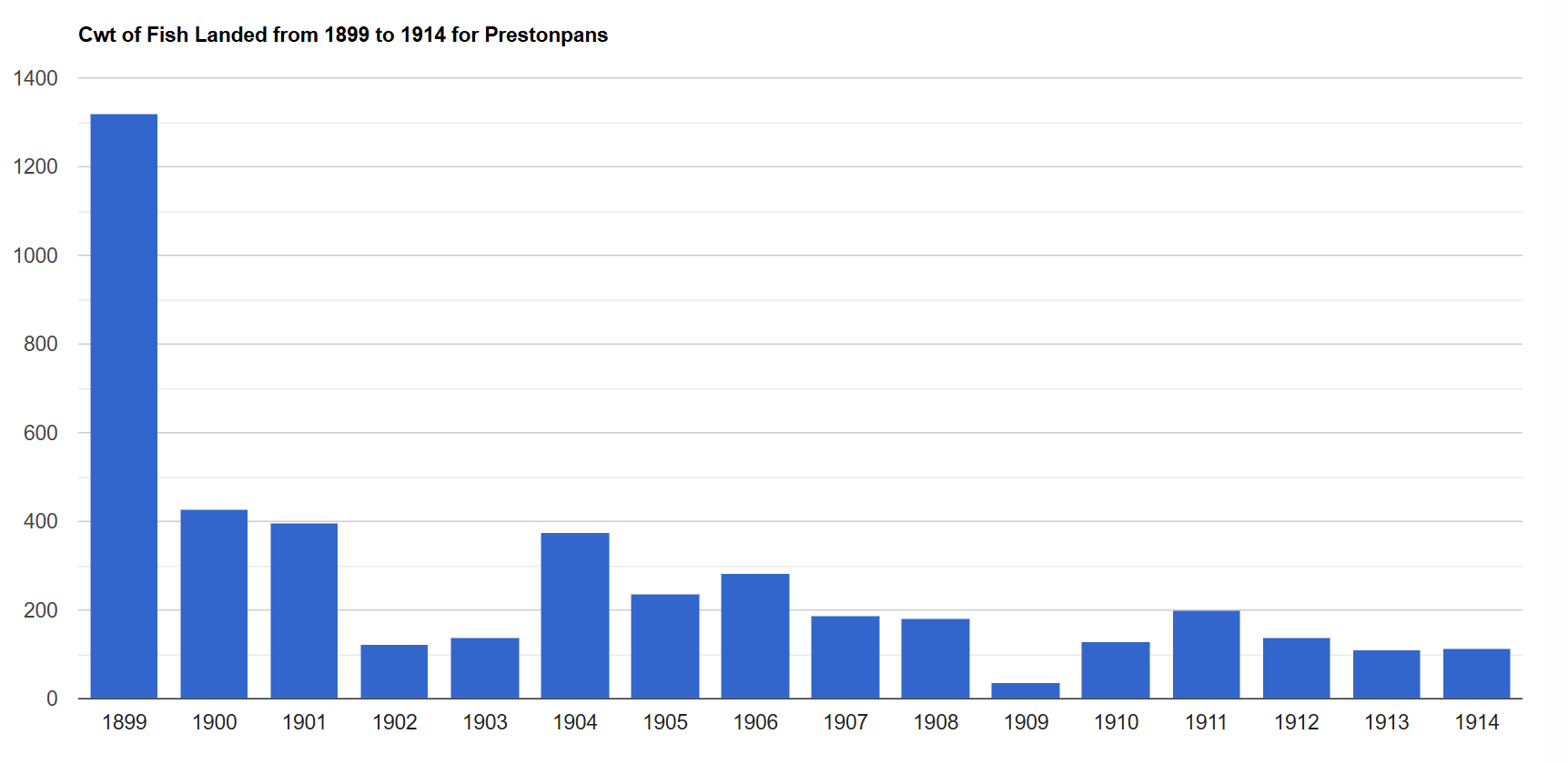
Cwt of fish landed

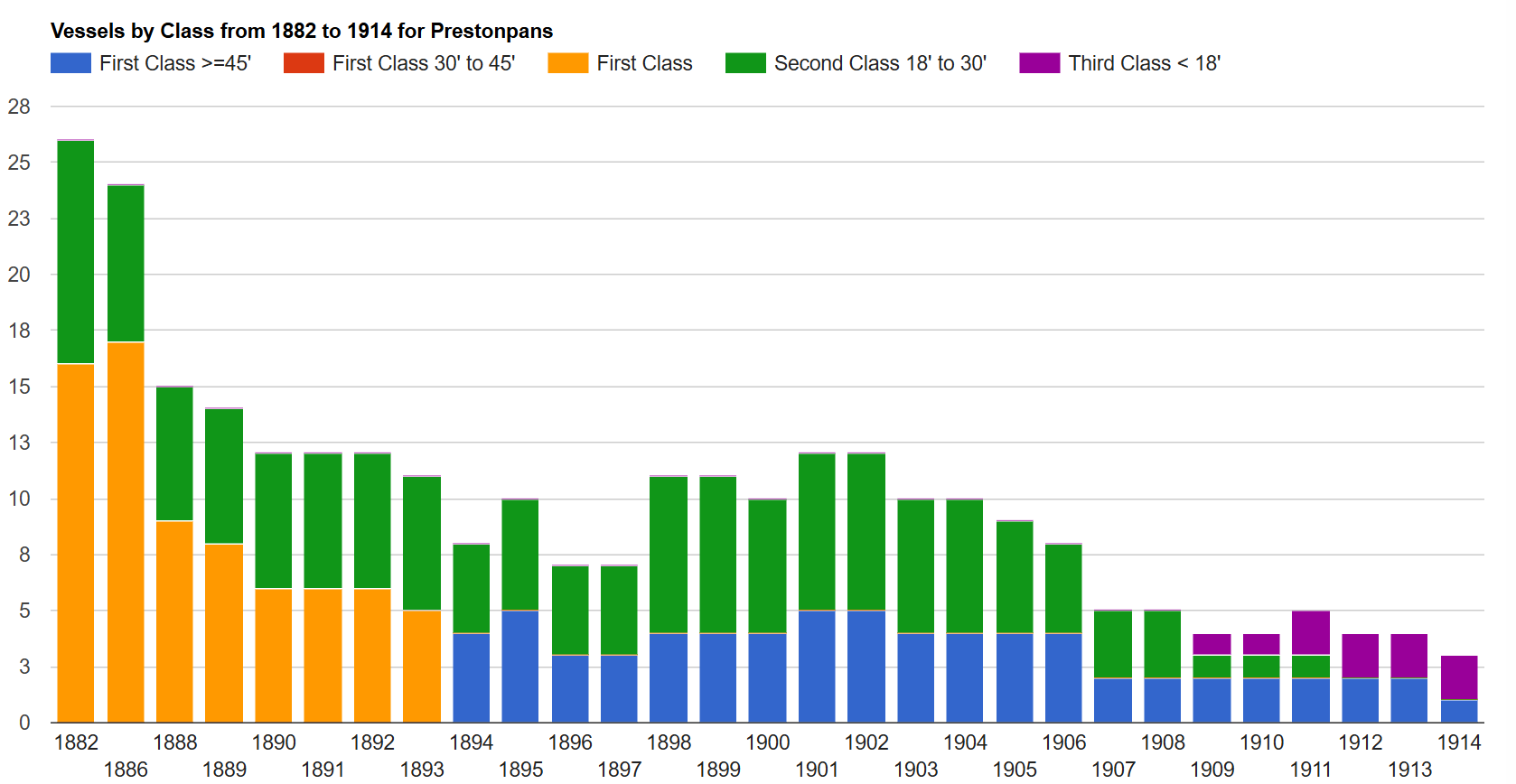
Vessels by class

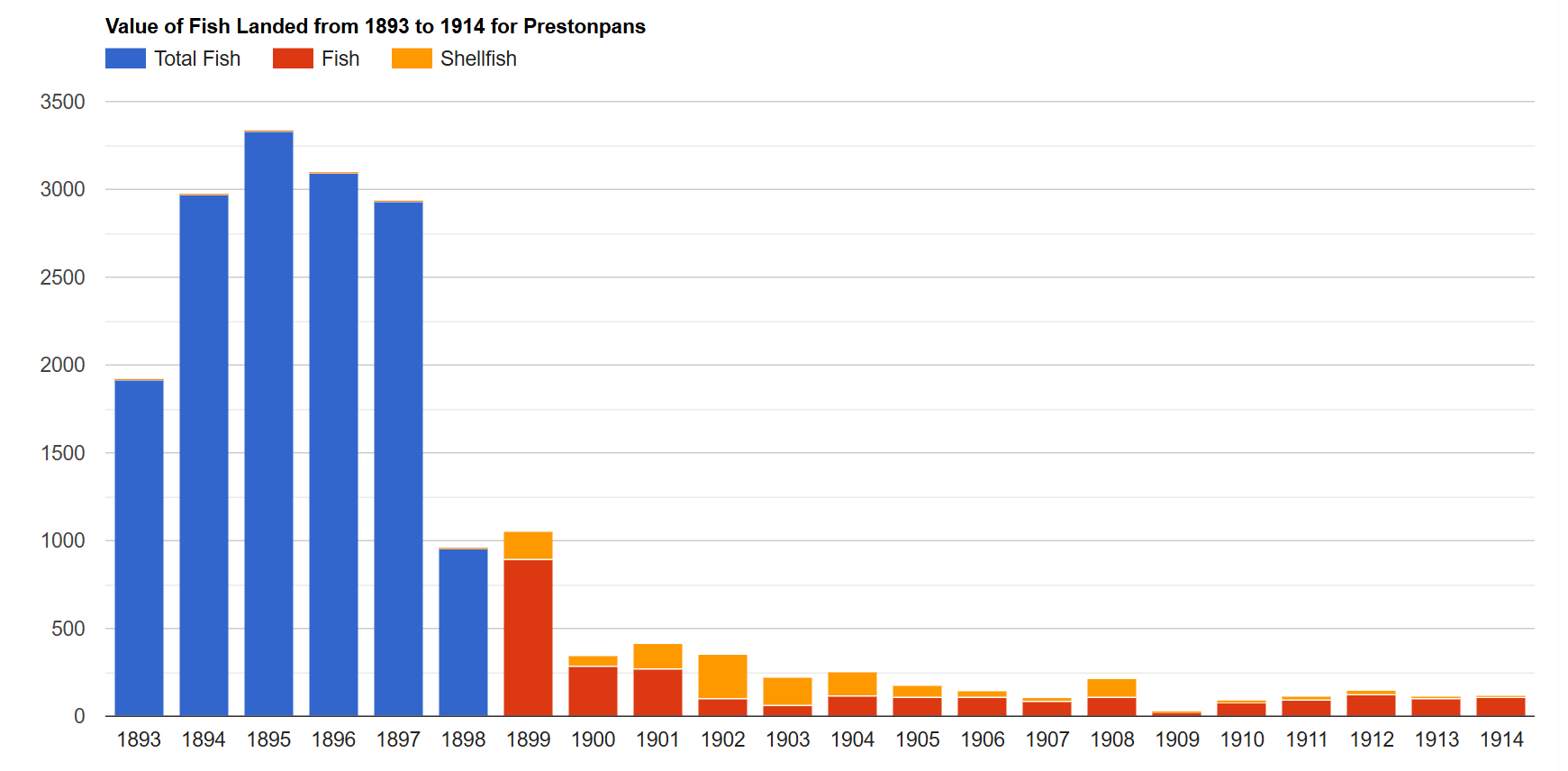
Value (£) of fish landed

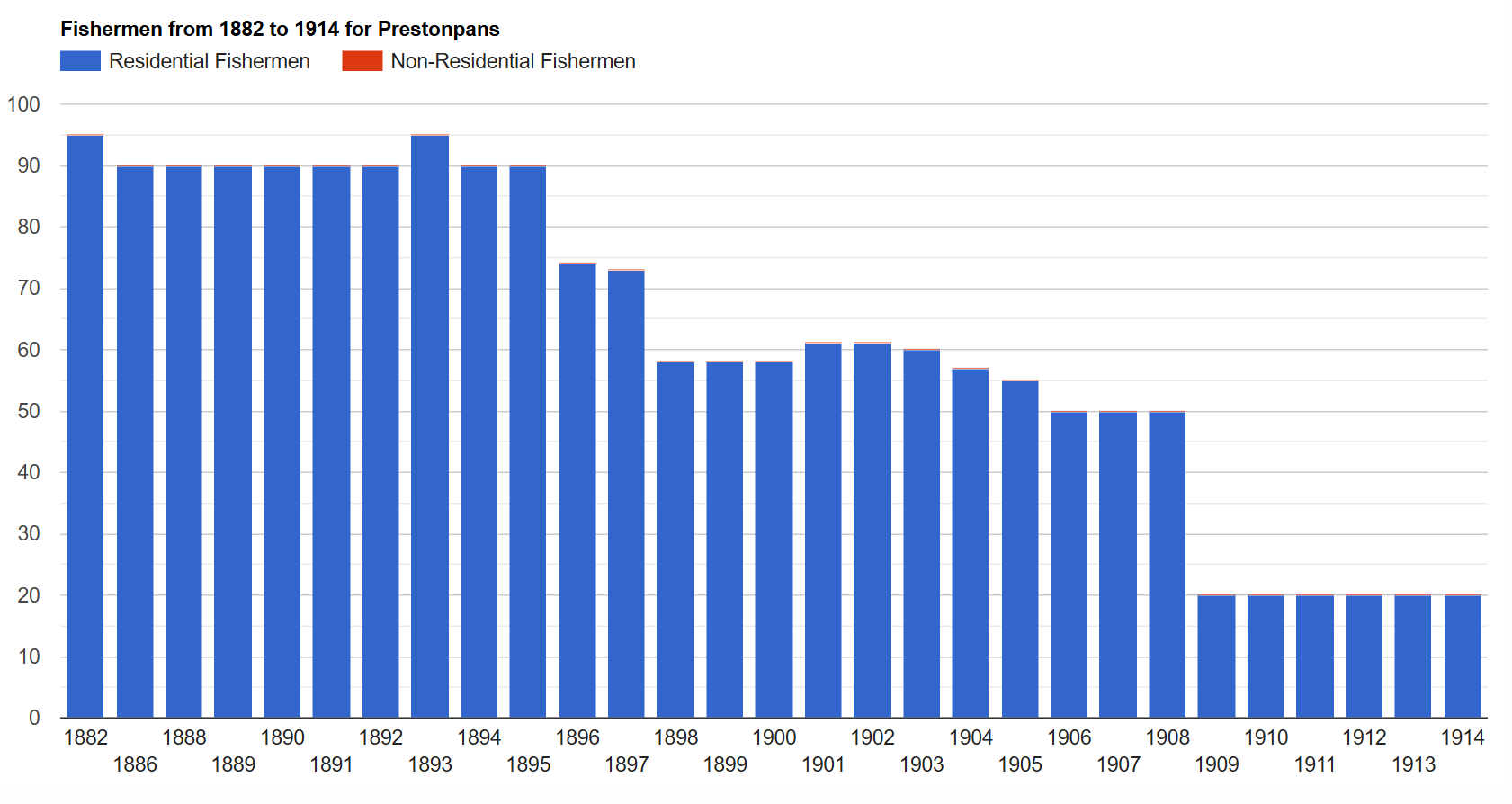
Fishermen

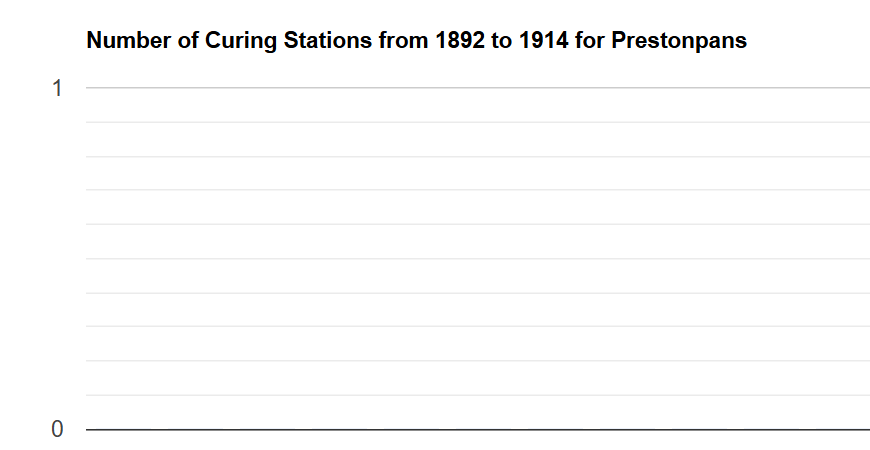
Plsceholder- no curing stations

=== Battle of Prestonpans ===
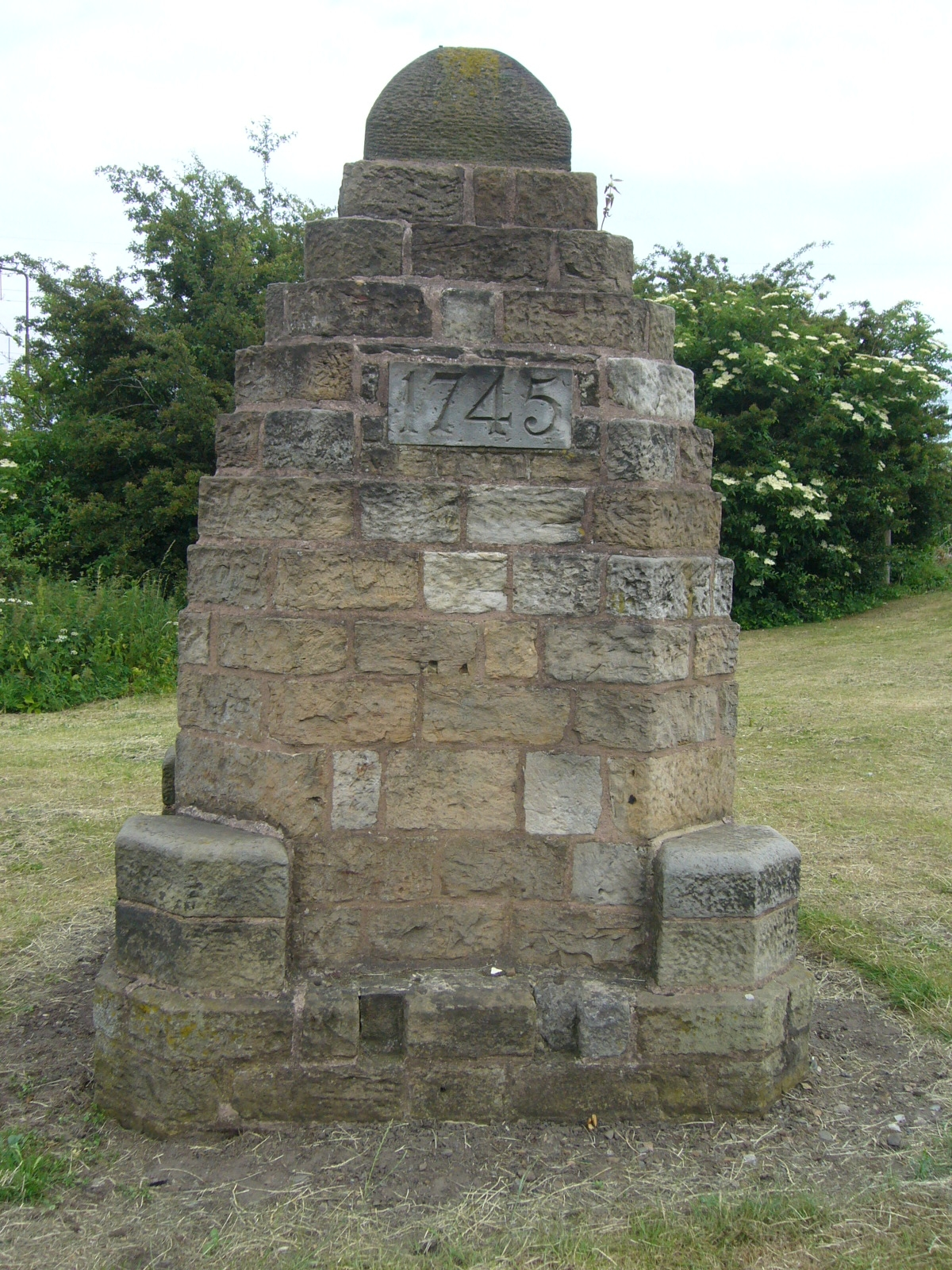
Battle cairn

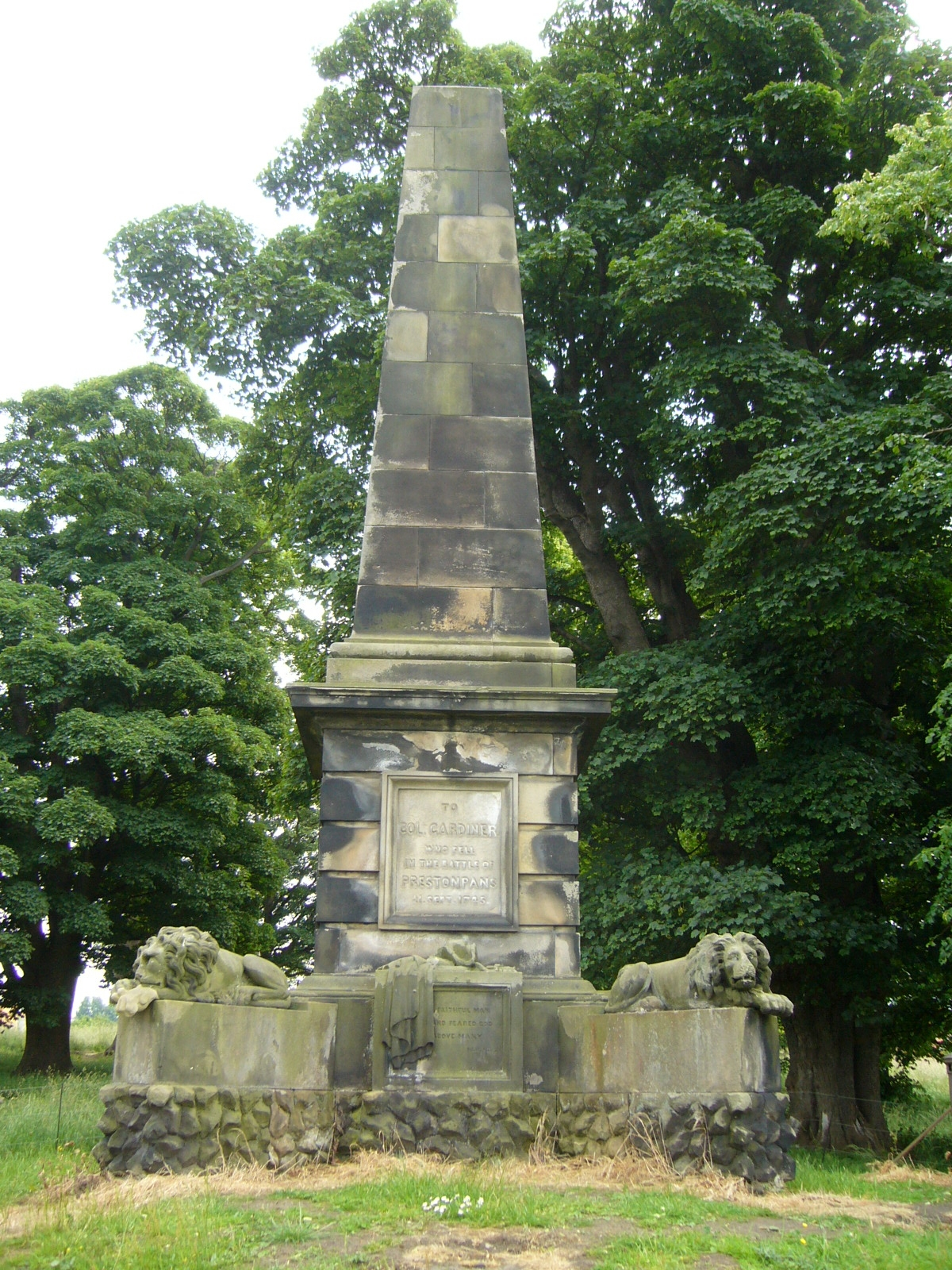
Colonel Gardiner's Monument

The Battle of Prestonpans (also known as the Battle of Gladsmuir) was the first significant conflict in the second Jacobite Rising. The battle took place on 21 September 1745. The Jacobite army loyal to James Francis Edward Stuart and led by his son Charles Edward Stuart defeated the army loyal to the Hanoverian George II led by Sir John Cope. The victory was a huge morale boost for the Jacobites, and a greatly mythologised version of the story entered art and legend. A memorial to the Battle of Prestonpans in the form of a modest stonemason-built cairn sits close to the battle site.

An earlier (and tellingly, much larger and more impressive) monument to Colonel James Gardiner, a Hanoverian who was mortally wounded on the field of battle, was also erected in 1853 near Bankton House where the Colonel lived. It was sculpted by Alexander Handyside Ritchie. A memorial in the parish church commemorates "John Stuart of Phisgul...barbarously murdered by four Highlanders near the end of the Battle".

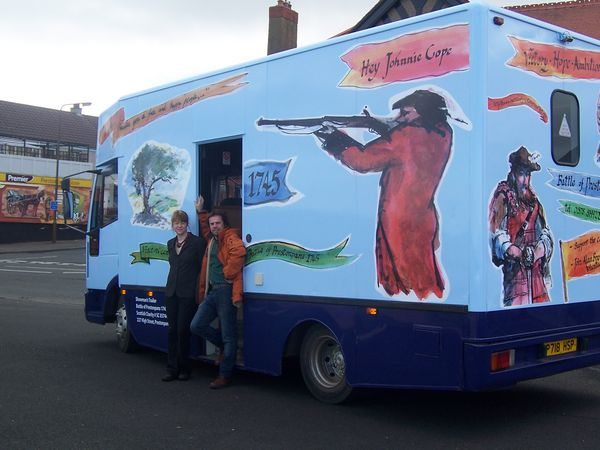
Battle of Prestonpans Heritage Trust's "Battle Bus"

In 2006, the Battle of Prestonpans (1745) Heritage Trust was established on the initiative of the local people to ensure much better presentation and interpretation. It attracted private and Heritage lottery funding to achieve some of its initial goals.

=== Battlefield archaeology ===
In 2008 the Trust commissioned Glasgow University Archaeological Research Division ("GUARD") to undertake a comprehensive survey, followed by selective excavation, of the battlefield. Although the site of the main battlefield is readily located today, fixed by such surviving features as the tramway embankment, interim findings announced in April 2010 indicate that the true site of the Highlanders' charge, based on concentrations of musket balls and other evidence, is 500 yards to the east of the accepted location (55°57′50″N 2°56′49″W). The battlefield has been inventoried and protected by Historic Scotland under the Scottish Historical Environment Policy of 2009.

Controversy arose after it became clear that battlefields lack legal protections: in 2014, East Lothian Council granted planning consent to develop a substation for a large offshore windfarm on the site. Historic Scotland eventually took the view that such activities would have a minimal impact and withdrew their objections.

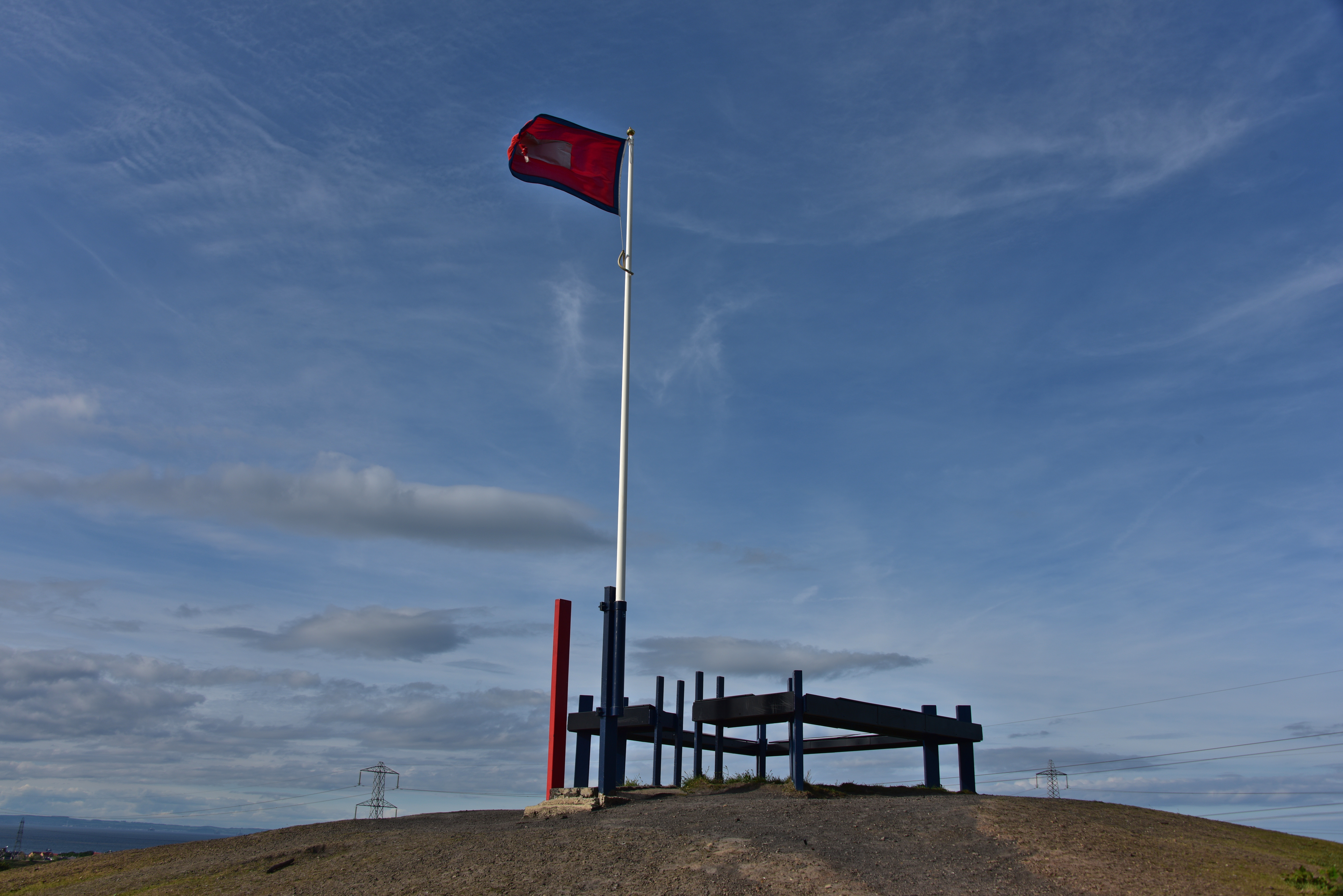
Viewpoint at Meadowmill

The battlefield benefits from a pyramidal viewpoint sculpted from an old coal bing at Meadowmill, atop which flies Prince Charlie's battle flag to mark where a series of interpretation boards can be found. There are a further seven information panels around the battlefield, regular guided walks and commemorative events. With support from Bord na Gaidhlig road and walkway signage now includes the Gaelic which was spoken by the majority of Highlanders at the battle. The Doocot at Bankton House now acts as an interpretation site for the life of Colonel Gardiner.

=== Prestonpans Tapestry ===
The Prestonpans Tapestry was unveiled on 26 July 2010. With 105 panels (each 1m long), it is about 100 ft (30m) longer than its inspiration, the Bayeux Tapestry. Inspired by Gordon Baron Prestoungrange, designed by local artist Andrew Crummy, and executed by over 200 volunteer embroiderers, the tapestry has already toured Scotland, England and France. Venues included the Scottish Parliament, the Scottish Storytelling Centre, Cockenzie power station and countless locations from Eriskay along the route The Prince took prior to the battle. In Autumn 2013, the Tapestry was a Guest Exhibit alongside the Bayeux Tapestry itself, in Normandy, and subsequently at Pornichet/ St Nazaire from whence the Prince embarked to begin his campaign in 1745.

=== Witch trials ===
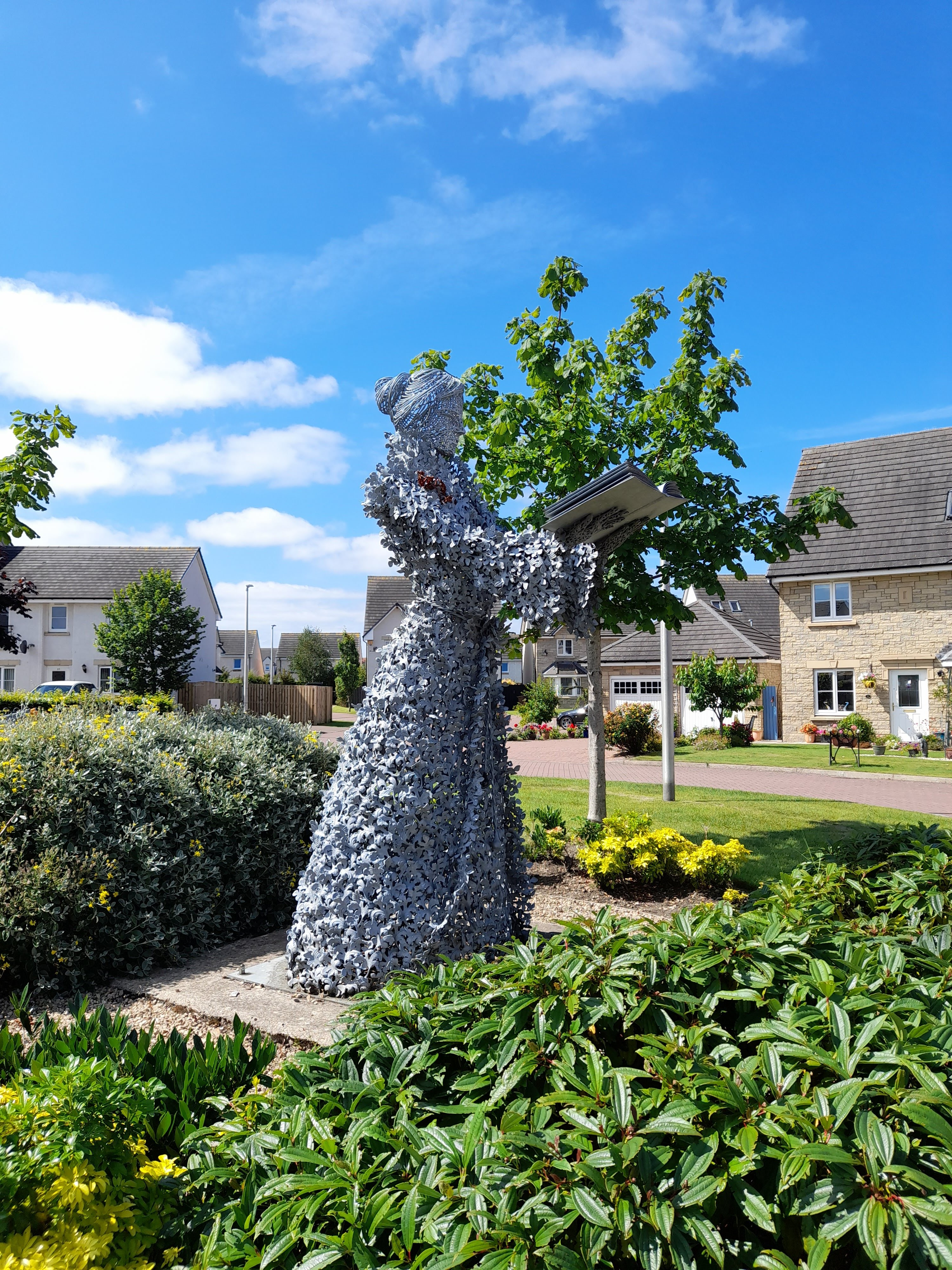
Memorial statue to 81 women executed for witchcraft in Prestonpans. Their innocence was publicly declared in 2004.

Prestonpans was one of the worst affected areas during the witch trials in early modern Scotland with as many as 81 women accused of witchcraft executed at the end of the 16th Century. In 2004, the Barons Courts of Prestoungrange and Dolphinstoun granted an Absolute Pardon to the accused women who are remembered annually on 31 October. A memorial statue was erected in the town in their memory.

== Education ==
The town has two primary schools, Preston Tower Primary School and St, Gabriels and the comprehensive Preston Lodge High School.

== Transport ==
Prestonpans railway station is on the Edinburgh – North Berwick line.

== Sport ==
The local non-league football team Preston Athletic plays its home games at the Pennypit Park in the town, as does the local rugby team Preston Lodge RFC. Prestonpans is also home to the Royal Musselburgh Golf Club.

== Twinning ==
In 2006, Prestonpans and the neighbouring towns of Cockenzie, Port Seton and Longniddry were twinned with the town of Barga, Tuscany, Italy.

== Notable residents ==
- Adam Abell, 16th-century friar and chronicler, author of The Roit or Quheil of Tyme.
- Thomas Alexander, military surgeon in the Crimean War
- John Davidson, reformer who set up the church and the school
- Robert Dick, inspector of salt works and prisoner on the Bass Rock.
- John Fian, a purported sorcerer executed in 1591.
- Allan Jacobsen, rugby union player.
- Bill Joyce, Former West Ham United, Tottenham Hotspur and Bolton Wanderers footballer.
- Andrew McDowall, Lord Bankton, judge
- David Mitton, British television director, producer and technician.
- James Mylne, poet, was Laird of Lochill, a small estate near Prestonpans, Haddingtonshire. d. 1788
- Tam Paton, Thomas Dougal "Tam" Paton was a pop group manager, most notably of the boy band the Bay City Rollers.
- Same Shaw, recipient of the Victoria Cross.
- Josh Taylor, professional boxer, notably the first man from the United Kingdom to become an undisputed world champion in the four-belt era.
- Martin Whitfield, former schoolteacher at Prestonpans Primary School, and the Labour Member of Parliament (MP) for East Lothian (2017–2019).

== See also ==
- Barony of Preston and Prestonpans
- Category: People from Prestonpans
- John Muir Way
- List of places in East Lothian
- Prestongrange Parish Church
