= Annabella Campbell, Countess of Lothian =

Scottish aristocrat

Annabella Campbell, Countess of Lothian (died 1652), was a Scottish aristocrat.

Annabella Campbell was a daughter of Archibald Campbell, 7th Earl of Argyll and Agnes Douglas, a daughter of William Douglas, 6th Earl of Morton.

In 1607 it was hoped that she would be appointed a lady of the bedchamber to Anne of Denmark. She married Robert Kerr, 2nd Earl of Lothian in 1609. He committed suicide in 1624. They had two daughters, Anne Kerr and Johanna Kerr. Anne Kerr married Sir William Kerr who was then made Earl of Lothian.

As dowager countess, Annabella signed her letters as "Annabella Lothiane". On 1 May 1632 she wrote to Sir Robert Kerr of the bedchamber praising his son William, her son-in-law. On 23 July 1643 she wrote to him from Paris mentioning William's recovery from illness.

Annabella, dowager Countess of Lothian, died at Antwerp, part of the Spanish Netherlands, in 1652.
