= Charles Kerr, 2nd Earl of Ancram =

Scottish peer

Charles Kerr, 2nd Earl of Ancram (6 August 1624 – September 1690) was a Scottish peer and a member of the English House of Commons.

== Biography ==
Charles was born on 6 August 1624 at Richmond, Surrey to Robert Kerr, 1st Earl of Ancram and his second wife, Anne daughter of William Stanley, 6th Earl of Derby. Through his mother, he was a 3 times-great grandson of Mary Tudor, Queen of France and Charles Brandon, 1st Duke of Suffolk, thereby making him a direct descendant of Henry VII. Until he inherited his father's title after the death of his father in December 1654 he was known by the courtesy title of Lord Carr.

Kerr had a long career in the English House of Commons. He was able to continue to sit in that house after he was ennobled, the fact that Earl of Ancram was a Scottish title was no impediment to sitting in the English House of Commons representing an English or Welsh constituency. Kerr was the Member of Parliament (MP) for St. Michaels in Cornwall between March 1647 and December 1648 in the Long Parliament. Robert Holborne, a Royalist, was disabled from sitting for St. Michaels and gave the seat to Kerr, who was the constituency's MP until he was excluded in Pride's Purge. Between July 1660 and December 1660 Kerr sat in the Convention Parliament representing Thirsk. After the Restoration In the Cavalier Parliament (from 1661 to 1681) he represented Wigan and again in the Oxford Parliament (from 1661 and 1681). The last Parliament in which he sat, still for Wigan, was the Loyal Parliament the first parliament of the reign of James II (from 1685 to 1687).

On his death, sometime between 1 September 1690 and 11 September 1690, the earldom devolved upon Robert Kerr, (afterwards Marquess of Lothian), the eldest son of Kerr's elder half brother William Kerr, 3rd Earl of Lothian.

== Family ==
Ancram married shortly before 1 May 1662, Frances (Knollys) Manfield, daughter of Sir Henry Knollys of Nursling, Hampshire, and Katherine Cornwallis, and widow of Sir Edward Manfield of Taplow, Buckinghamshire. She was a Lady of the Bedchamber to Catherine, Queen Consort to King Charles II. They had a daughter, Anne. They had a son who died before his father without children.

== Notes ==
Parliament of England
Vacant Title last held by William Chadwell; Robert Holborne	Member of Parliament for Mitchell; 1647–1648	Vacant Title next held by James Launce; Richard Lobb
Preceded by Barrington Bourchier; William Stanley	Member of Parliament for Thirsk; 1660–1661; With: Barrington Bourchier	Succeeded by Sir Thomas Ingram; Walter Strickland
Preceded by John Molyneux; Roger Stoughton	Member of Parliament for Wigan; 1661–1689; With: Geoffrey Shakerley 1661–1679; Roger Bradshaigh 1679; William Banks 1679–1681; Viscount Colchester 1681–1685; Lord Charles Murray 1685–1689	Succeeded by Sir Edward Chisenhall; William Banks
Peerage of Scotland
Preceded by Robert Kerr	Earl of Ancram; 1654–1690	Succeeded by Robert Kerr
