= Agnes Douglas, Countess of Argyll =

Scottish noblewoman (1574–1607)

Agnes Douglas
- Countess of Argyll
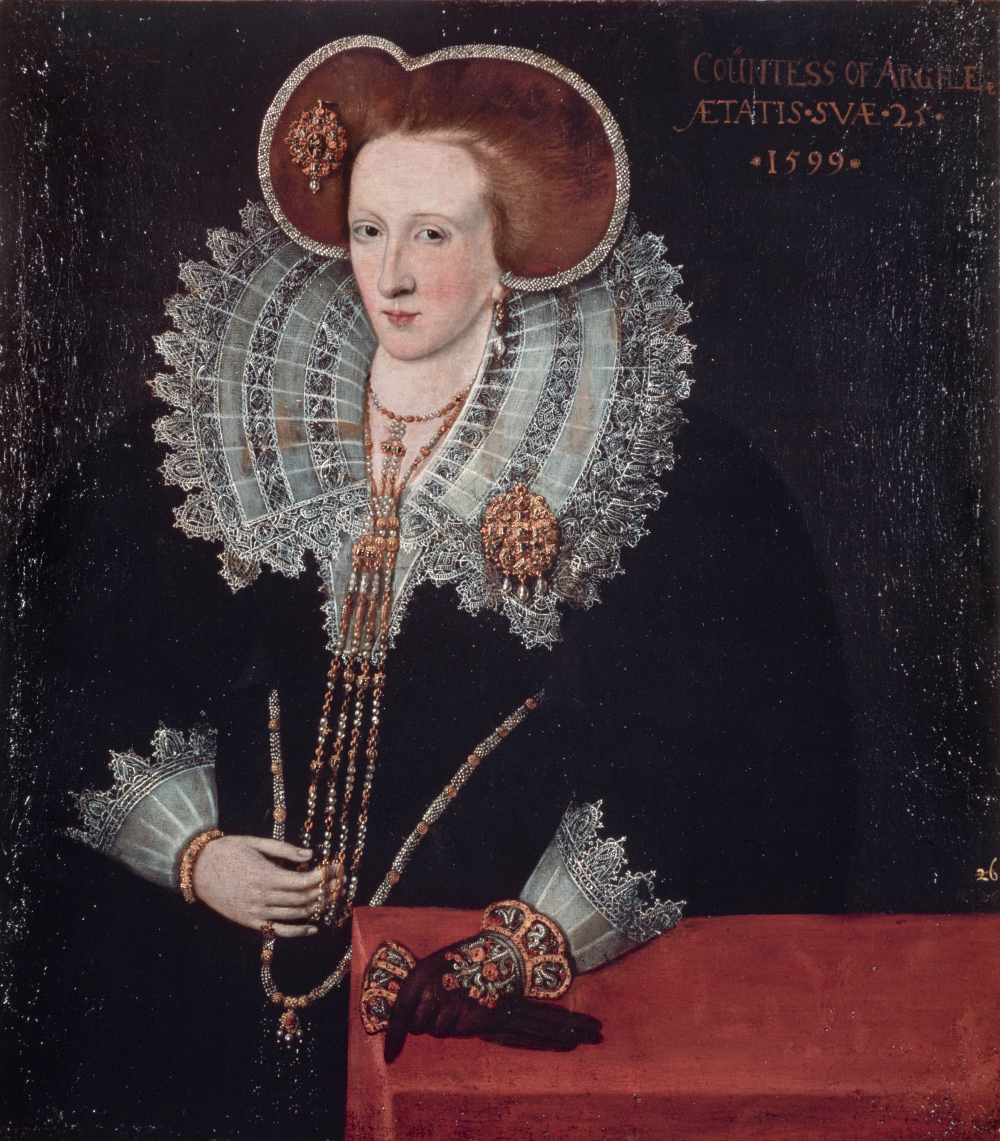
- Portrait of Agnes Douglas, Countess of Argyll. It was painted by Adrian Vanson in 1599
- Born: 1574; Lochleven Castle, Scotland
- Died: 3 May 1607 (aged 32-33)
- Noble family: Douglas
- Spouse: Archibald Campbell, 7th Earl of Argyll
- Issue: Lady Annabel Campbell; Lady Anne Campbell; Archibald Campbell, 1st Marquess of Argyll
- Father: Sir William Douglas, 6th Earl of Morton
- Mother: Agnes Leslie

Agnes Douglas, Countess of Argyll (1574 – 3 May 1607) was a Scottish noblewoman and the first wife of Archibald Campbell, 7th Earl of Argyll. She was the mother of three of his children, including his heir, Archibald Campbell, 1st Marquess of Argyll, the de facto head of the government in Scotland throughout most of the conflict known as the Wars of the Three Kingdoms. Lady Agnes was considered so beautiful that she was described as a "pearl of Lochleven."

== Family ==
Lady Agnes Douglas was born at Lochleven Castle, Scotland, in 1574, one of the eleven children of Sir William Douglas, 6th Earl of Morton, and Agnes Leslie. She had four brothers and six sisters. Lady Agnes and her sisters were so famed for their beauty throughout Scotland that they were known as the "pearls of Lochleven".

Her paternal grandparents were Sir Robert Douglas and Margaret Erskine, a former mistress of King James V of Scotland, and her maternal grandparents were George Leslie, 4th Earl of Rothes, and Margaret Crichton, an illegitimate daughter of Princess Margaret, the youngest sister of King James III. Her half-uncle was James Stewart, 1st Earl of Moray, Regent of Scotland, and the illegitimate son of her grandmother, Margaret, from the latter's liaison with King James V. He was assassinated in 1570.

Before Agnes's birth, from June 1567 until her escape in May 1568, Mary, Queen of Scots, was a prisoner at Lochleven Castle, where her father served as custodian and her mother was the queen's closest female companion. The queen escaped from Lochleven with the aid of George Douglas, Agnes's uncle, and Willy Douglas, a cousin who was resident at the castle.

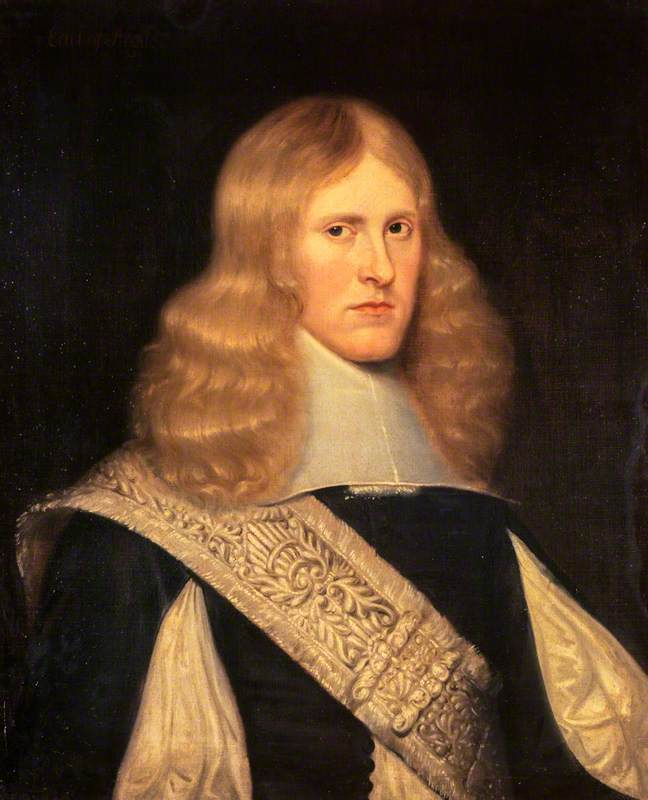
Archibald Campbell, 1st Marquess of Argyll, the only son of Agnes Douglas and an influential Covenanter

Her father succeeded to the Earldom of Morton in 1588 as the 6th earl upon the death of his kinsman, Archibald Douglas, 5th Earl of Morton. The title had been forfeited in 1581 when James Douglas, 4th Earl of Morton, regent of Scotland, was executed and attainted for his part in the murder of Henry Stewart, Lord Darnley, in 1567. It was restored to the Douglas family in 1586.

== Marriage and children ==
On 24 July 1592 at Dalkeith Palace, she married, as his first wife, Archibald Campbell, 7th Earl of Argyll, the son of Colin Campbell, 6th Earl of Argyll, and Agnes Keith. Agnes, who was a Roman Catholic, was instrumental in her husband's later decision to convert to the Catholic faith in 1618, eleven years after her death. Despite Agnes's religion, he commanded the royal troops which fought against the Catholic rebels led by George Gordon, 1st Marquess of Huntly, in the Battle of Glenlivet on 3 October 1594. Argyll's forces were defeated by the numerically smaller forces of Huntly.

The marriage produced three children:

- Lady Annabel Campbell (died 1652), married Robert Kerr, 2nd Earl of Lothian, by whom she had two daughters.
- Lady Anne Campbell (died 14 June 1638), married George Gordon, 2nd Marquess of Huntly, by whom she had seven children.
- Archibald Campbell, 1st Marquess of Argyll (April 1607 – 27 May 1661), de facto head of government in Scotland during most of the conflict known as the Wars of the Three Kingdoms, and the most influential member of the Covenanter movement during the English Civil War. In 1626, he married Lady Margaret Douglas (1610–1678), by whom he had four children, including his heir, Archibald Campbell, 9th Earl of Argyll. He was executed in 1661 by the orders of King Charles II of England on charges of High Treason. His head was exposed on top of the Tolbooth.

In January 1600 she imprisoned Thomas Alexander of Balruidy in Castle Campbell, who her lawyer and John Archibald, Captain of Castle Campbell, claimed was a sheep rustler.

Agnes died on 3 May 1607, a month after the birth of her only son, Archibald.

She was buried at Kilmun Parish Church. Her husband married secondly, on 30 November 1610, Anne Cornwallis, by whom he had three more children.

== Agnes Douglas in art ==
In 1599, when she was twenty-five years old, Agnes's portrait was painted by Flemish artist Adrian Vanson. It is displayed in the National Gallery of Scotland.

== Ancestors ==
Ancestors of Agnes Douglas, Countess of Argyll

16. Sir Robert Douglas of Lochleven
8. Thomas Douglas
17. Margaret Balfour
4. Sir Robert Douglas of Lochleven
18. Archibald "the Red" Boyd of Bonshaw
9. Elizabeth Boyd
19. Christian Mure
2. William Douglas, 6th Earl of Morton
20. Robert Erskine, 4th Lord Erskine
10. John Erskine, 5th Lord Erskine
21. Isabel Campbell
5. Margaret Erskine
22. Archibald Campbell, 2nd Earl of Argyll
11. Margaret Campbell
23. Elizabeth Stewart
1. Agnes Douglas, Countess of Argyll
24. Andrew Leslie, Master of Rothes
12. William Leslie, 3rd Earl of Rothes
25. Elizabeth Sinclair
6. George Leslie, 4th Earl of Rothes
26. Sir Michael Balfour of Monquhanny
13. Margaret Balfour
27. Marjory Durie
3. Agnes Leslie, Countess of Morton
28.
14. William Crichton, 3rd Lord Crichton
29.
7. Margaret Crichton
30. James II of Scotland
15. Princess Margaret Stewart
31. Mary of Guelders
