= Anne Kerr, Countess of Lothian =

Scottish aristocrat and landowner

Anne Kerr, Countess of Lothian (died 1667) was a Scottish aristocrat and landowner.

She was the daughter of Robert Kerr, 2nd Earl of Lothian (d. 1624) and Annabella Campbell, daughter of Archibald Campbell, 7th Earl of Argyll (d. 1652).

On the death of her father by suicide she became Countess of Lothian in her own right. Her property seems to have been managed by the courtier Sir Robert Kerr of Ancram, and she later married his son.

She married William Kerr of Ancram (d. 1675) in 1630 or early in 1631. He was the son of Robert Kerr of Ancram, later Earl of Ancram (1578–1654) and Elizabeth Murray, daughter of John Murray of Blackbarony, After the marriage, William Kerr became known as the Earl of Lothian by special grant in 1631.

Sir William Kerr of Blackhope claimed the title of Earl of Lothian as nearest male heir, despite the charter granting it to Anne Kerr. His claim was denied by the Privy Council of England in March 1632.

The monogram of Anne Kerr and William Kerr with the date 1666 can be seen at Newbattle Abbey.

She died on 16 March 1667.

== Children ==
Her children included:

- Anne Kerr (1631-1658), who married Alexander Fraser, Master of Saltoun, their children included William Fraser, 12th Lord Saltoun
- Elizabeth Kerr (b. 1633), who married John Borthwick, 9th Lord Borthwick (1616-1675)
- Robert Ker, 1st Marquess of Lothian (1636-1703), who married Jean Campbell (d. 1700), a daughter of Archibald Campbell, 1st Marquess of Argyll
- William Kerr of Halden (b. 1638), who married Agnes Cockburn, a daughter of John Cockburn of Ormiston
- Mary Kerr (1640-1708), who married James Bodie of Brodie
- Vere Kerr (1649-1674)
- Henrietta Kerr (1653-1741), who married Francis Scott of Thirlestane
- Charles Kerr of Abbotrule (b. 1642)
- Captain John Kerr (b. 1647)
- Margaret Kerr (b. 1645), who married James Richardson of Smeaton

Peerage of Scotland
Preceded by Robert Kerr	Countess of Lothian; 1624–1667	Succeeded by Robert Kerr
