= Agnes Leslie, Countess of Morton =

Scottish noblewoman (c. 1542 – c. 1606)

Agnes Leslie
- Countess of Morton
- Born: After 1541; Scotland
- Died: c.1606
- Noble family: Leslie
- Spouse: William Douglas, 6th Earl of Morton
- Issue: Christian Douglas of Morton; Robert Douglas, Master of Morton; James Douglas, Commendator of Melrose; Sir Archibald Douglas of Kilmour; Sir George Douglas of Kirkness; Euphemia Douglas of Morton; Agnes Douglas, Countess of Argyll; Elizabeth Douglas of Morton; Jean Douglas of Morton; Mary Douglas of Morton; Margaret Douglas of Morton
- Father: George Leslie, 4th Earl of Rothes
- Mother: Agnes Somerville

Agnes Leslie, Countess of Morton (born after 1541 – c. 1606) was a Scottish noblewoman, being the daughter of George Leslie, 4th Earl of Rothes. She was the wife of William Douglas, 6th Earl of Morton, who as Laird of Lochleven Castle was the custodian of Mary, Queen of Scots during her captivity from June 1567 until her escape on 2 May 1568. Agnes was Queen Mary's chief female companion throughout her imprisonment; thus it was while Lady Agnes was recovering from childbirth that the queen successfully escaped from Lochleven.

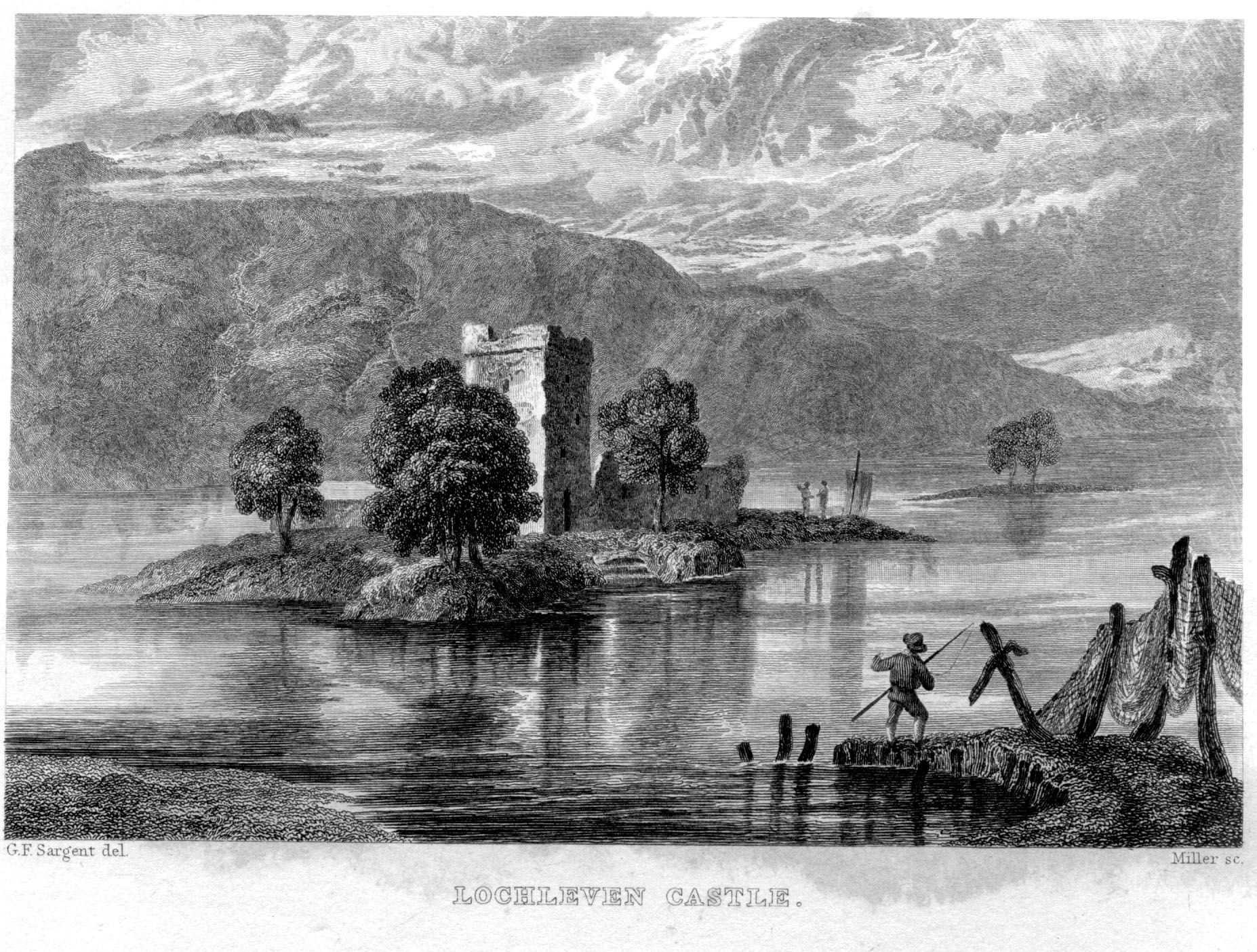
Engraving of Lochleven Castle, home of Lady Agnes Leslie and her husband William Douglas, 6th Earl of Morton

== Family ==
Lady Agnes was born sometime after 1541 in Scotland, the daughter of George Leslie, 4th Earl of Rothes, Ambassador to Denmark (died 28 November 1558), by his marriage to Agnes Somerville . Agnes had five sisters, Margaret who married John Cunningham of Glengarnock, Beatrix, Elizabeth (or Isabel), Euphemia and Margaret who married Archibald Douglas 8th Earl of Angus, and two elder brothers, Andrew Leslie, 5th Earl of Rothes and James. She had several half-siblings by her father's first marriage to Margaret Crichton.

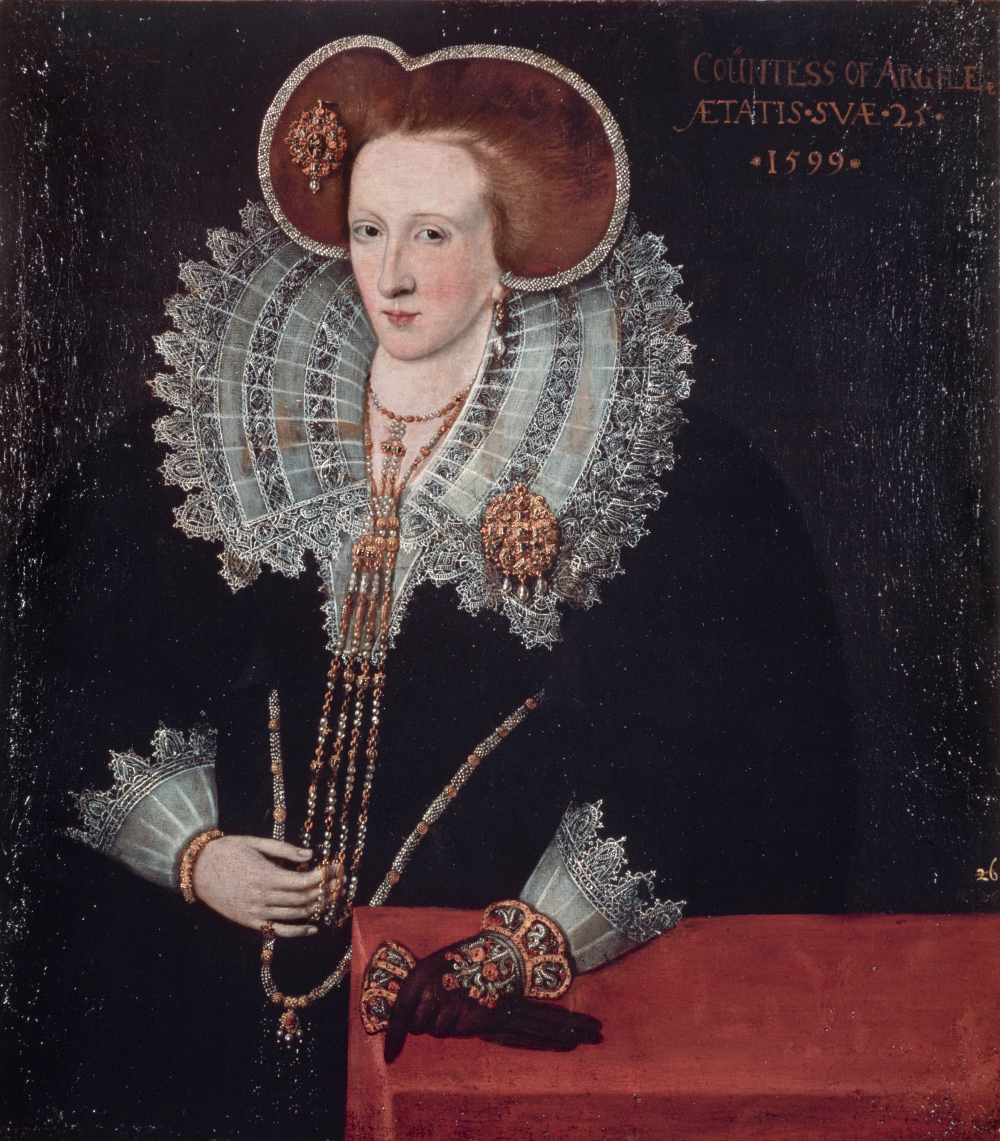
Portrait of Agnes Douglas, Countess of Argyll, daughter of Lady Agnes Leslie. Painted in 1599, and sometimes attributed to Adrian Vanson.

== Marriage and issue ==
On 26 November 1554 she married Sir William Douglas, Laird of Lochleven. The contract for their marriage was signed on 19 August 1554. Sir William was the son of Sir Robert Douglas and Margaret Erskine, a former mistress of King James V of Scotland. Sir William's half-brother from his mother's liaison with the king was James Stewart, 1st Earl of Moray, Regent of Scotland from 1567 until his assassination in January 1570. Sir William's cousin was another Regent of Scotland James Douglas, 4th Earl of Morton. The couple made their home at Lochleven Castle, which was a fortress situated on an island in the middle of the loch, and where his widowed mother also resided.

Sir William and Agnes together had eleven children:

- Christian Douglas, married firstly Laurence of Oliphant, by whom she had issue; she married secondly Alexander, 1st Earl of Home.
- Robert Douglas, Master of Morton (killed by pirates in March 1585), married Jean Lyon of Glamis, by whom he had two sons, including William Douglas, 7th Earl of Morton, who in his turn married Lady Anne Keith, by whom he had issue.
- James Douglas, Commendator of Melrose, married firstly Mary Kerr, by whom he had issue; secondly Helen Scott, by whom he had issue; and thirdly Jean Anstruther, by whom he had issue.
- Sir Archibald Douglas of Kilmour (died 1649). He travelled with James VI to meet Anne of Denmark in Oslo in October 1589. He married Barbara Forbes (born 31 January 1560), by whom he had one son.
- Sir George Douglas of Kirkness (died December 1609), married Margaret Forrester.
- Euphemia Douglas, married Sir Thomas Lyon of Auldbar, Master of Glamis.
- Lady Agnes Douglas (1574- 3 May 1607), on 24 July 1592 married as his first wife Archibald Campbell, 7th Earl of Argyll, the son of Colin Campbell, 6th Earl of Argyll and Agnes Keith, by whom she had one son and two daughters.
- Elizabeth Douglas, married Francis Hay, 9th Earl of Erroll, by whom she had issue.
- Jean Douglas
- Mary Douglas, married Sir Walter Ogilvy, 1st Lord Ogilvy of Deskford, by whom she had issue.
- Margaret Douglas, married Sir John Wemyss of Wemyss.

In June 1567, Queen Mary was imprisoned in Sir William's castle of Lochleven. Agnes became the Queen's chief female companion during her ten and a half months of imprisonment, accompanying her throughout the day and often sleeping in her bedchamber. It was following the birth of Agnes's child when she was recovering from her pregnancy, thus providing Queen Mary with greater liberty, that Mary chose to escape from Lochleven with the aid of Sir William's brother George and a young orphaned cousin named William Douglas who also lived at the castle and may or may not have been the earl's illegitimate son. When Sir William learned of his royal captive's escape, he was so distressed that he attempted to stab himself with his own dagger.

Agnes's seven daughters were said to have been so beautiful that they were known as "the pearls of Lochleven".

In 1586, the earldom of Morton which had been forfeited in 1581 following the execution and attainder of the 4th Earl of Morton for being one of Henry Stuart, Lord Darnley's murderers, returned to the Douglas family. In 1588, upon the death of Archibald Douglas, 5th Earl of Morton, Sir William became the 6th Earl of Morton. From that time onward Agnes was styled the Countess of Morton. Sir William received the charter for the earldom on 20 July 1589.

Agnes Leslie wrote to Earl of Morton that he was ordered to convey Anne of Denmark (to Stirling Castle) and should command his cooks and stewards to make good cheer for the Duke of Lennox and Lord Lindores. She was one of 8 "dames of honour" appointed to attend Prince Henry at Stirling Castle in 1594. Sir Robert Cecil noted in 1599 that her husband was retired from politics, but Agnes Leslie was still a "great practicer", and in the confidence of Anne of Denmark.

Agnes died sometime around the year 1606, which was the same year her husband died.
