= William Cornwallis (died 1611) =

English courtier and politician

Sir William Cornwallis JP

Member of Parliament for Lostwithiel
- In office September 1601 – 29 December 1601 Serving with John Cooke
- Preceded by: Francis Godolphin
- Succeeded by: Richard Cromwell

Personal details
- Born: c. 1549 Brome, Suffolk, England
- Died: 13 November 1611 (aged 61–62)
- Spouses: Lucy Neville (died 1609); Jane Mewtas (m. 1609)
- Children: 7, including Anne and Frederick
- Parents: Sir Thomas Cornwallis; Anne Jerningham Cornwallis
- Relatives: Elizabeth Kitson (sister); Charles Cornwallis (brother)

Sir William Cornwallis of Brome (c. 1549 – 13 November 1611) was an English courtier and politician.

== Life ==
He was the eldest son of Sir Thomas Cornwallis, Comptroller of the Household to Queen Mary, and his wife Anne Jerningham. He became a courtier at around age 21, spent heavily to secure position there, and married by 1578, Lucy Neville.

Despite a family connection to Thomas Cecil, Cornwallis made little enough progress at court, and twice withdrew without regard for the loss of royal favour. In 1597 he was elected Member of Parliament for Lostwithiel, with the support of Cecil. When James VI and I came to the throne he fared no better, and he retired from public life in 1605.

Cornwallis spent freely and entertained the Queen at his house in Highgate. He was knighted, by 1594. At the Union of the Crowns, in June 1603 he rode to Northamptonshire to meet Anne of Denmark and her children.

He laid on a performance by his friend Ben Jonson at Highgate in 1604, for James I, known as the Penates. He employed the composer Thomas Watson and other musical and literary men.

Cornwallis died on 13 November 1611.

== Family ==
Cornwallis married, first, Lucy Neville, daughter of John Neville, 4th Baron Latimer and Lucy Somerset. After her death, he married Jane Mewtas. She was a lady in waiting to Anne of Denmark and as a wedding gift the queen gave her a jewel studded with diamonds made by George Heriot. The Cornwallis family lived at Brome Hall near Diss in Norfolk.

- Frederick Cornwallis, 1st Baron Cornwallis was the third son, and eldest surviving son, of Sir William, a son of his second marriage. His own second marriage was to Elizabeth Crofts, daughter of Sir Henry Crofts, Member of Parliament for Eye.

Of the daughters:

- Frances married Sir Edmund Withypole.
- Elizabeth married in 1596 Sir William Sandys, Member of Parliament for Winchester, who died in 1628. In 1630 she married Richard Lumley, 1st Viscount Lumley of Waterford.
- Cornelia married Sir Richard Fermor of Somerton. In 1617, she accidentally shot and killed a young lawyer, John Onley.
- Anne in 1609 married Archibald Campbell, 7th Earl of Argyll.

There are sources that give Thomas Cornwallis, Member of Parliament for Suffolk in 1625, as a son of Sir William by his first wife. The History of Parliament, on the other hand, gives his father as John Cornwallis of Earl Soham. Sir William Cornwallis, the essayist, was a nephew who is sometimes described as "the younger" to differentiate him from this William Cornwallis, who is often described as "the elder".
