= Robert Kerr, 2nd Earl of Lothian =

Scottish noble

Robert Kerr, 2nd Earl of Lothian (died 1624) was a Scottish noble.

== His life ==
Robert Kerr was the son of Mark Kerr, 1st Earl of Lothian, who had been given the new title in 1606. He was the eldest son, with three brothers: William, Mark, and James, and sisters. In 1606 he became Master of Requests. When his father, the 1st Earl of Lothian, died in 1609, Robert succeeded him as the 2nd Earl of Lothian. A eulogic poem by William Douglas of Tofts mentioned that the Earl had traveled through most parts of Europe and was a student of mathematics and astrology.

In 1617 the Earl and John Hamilton of Preston held a trial for John Hunter, the blacksmith in Prestonpans. Over several years he had stolen iron plough shares and fittings from farms in the neighbouring villages for scrap metal.

== Marriage ==
In 1611 he married Lady Annabella Campbell, who was the daughter of Archibald Campbell, 7th Earl of Argyll. They had two daughters, Anne and Johanna. His wife died in 1652. His daughter Anne was married on 9 December 1630 to her kinsman Sir William Kerr of Ancrum, who was created a new Earl of Lothian on 31 October 1631. Robert Kerr and Annabella Campbell also had a daughter named Joanna.

== Suicide and succession ==
He committed suicide on 6 March 1624. That Saturday Robert Kerr dismissed his servants from him and went alone to a chamber in Newbattle Abbey, saying he was writing his letters and accounts. After barring the door, he stabbed himself several times and cut his throat. At the time it was rumoured that he was beset by debt or that he had been consulting with magicians and witches.

He had married Annabella, the daughter of Archibald Earl of Argyll. As he had no male heirs, he had obtained a charter in 1621 for his lands and titles so that his daughter, Anne Kerr, could succeed him, provided that she married a member of the family of Ker. Anne became Countess of Lothian in her own right. However, Sir Robert Kerr of Ancram was apparently given control of the Earl's possessions by James VI of Scotland in 1625. Subsequently, the Countess, Anne, and Sir Robert's son, Sir William Kerr, married, and Sir William was duly made Earl of Lothian on 26 July 1631. William Kerr is often called the 3rd Earl of Lothian, or the 1st Earl, regarding the re-grant of the title as a new creation.

Peerage of Scotland
Preceded by Mark Kerr	Earl of Lothian; 1609–1624	Succeeded by Anne Kerr & William Kerr
