= Lady Anne Stanley =

Lady Anne Stanley may refer to:

- Anne Stanley, Countess of Castlehaven (1580–1647), daughter and heir of Ferdinando Stanley, 5th Earl of Derby
- Anne Stanley, Countess of Ancram (c. 1600 – 1656/1657), daughter of William Stanley, 6th Earl of Derby
- Anne Stanley, Countess of Derby, wife of Thomas Stanley, 2nd Earl of Derby
- Anne Stanley (politician) (born 1961), Australian politician

== See also ==
- Anne Stanley (politician), Australian politician
