= William Kerr, 2nd Marquess of Lothian =

British Army general (1661–1722)

Lieutenant-General The Most Honourable The Marquess of Lothian KT
- Born: 27 March 1661 (baptismal date); Newbattle, Midlothian
- Died: 28 February 1722; London
- Burial place: Westminster Abbey
- Military career
- Allegiance: Scotland 1685–1707; (United Kingdom) Great Britain 1707–1713
- Branch: Dragoons and Infantry
- Rank: Lieutenant-General
- Units: 7th Regiment of Dragoons, later 7th Queen's Own Hussars 1696–1707; Scots Footguards, 1707–1713
- Awards: Knight of the Thistle

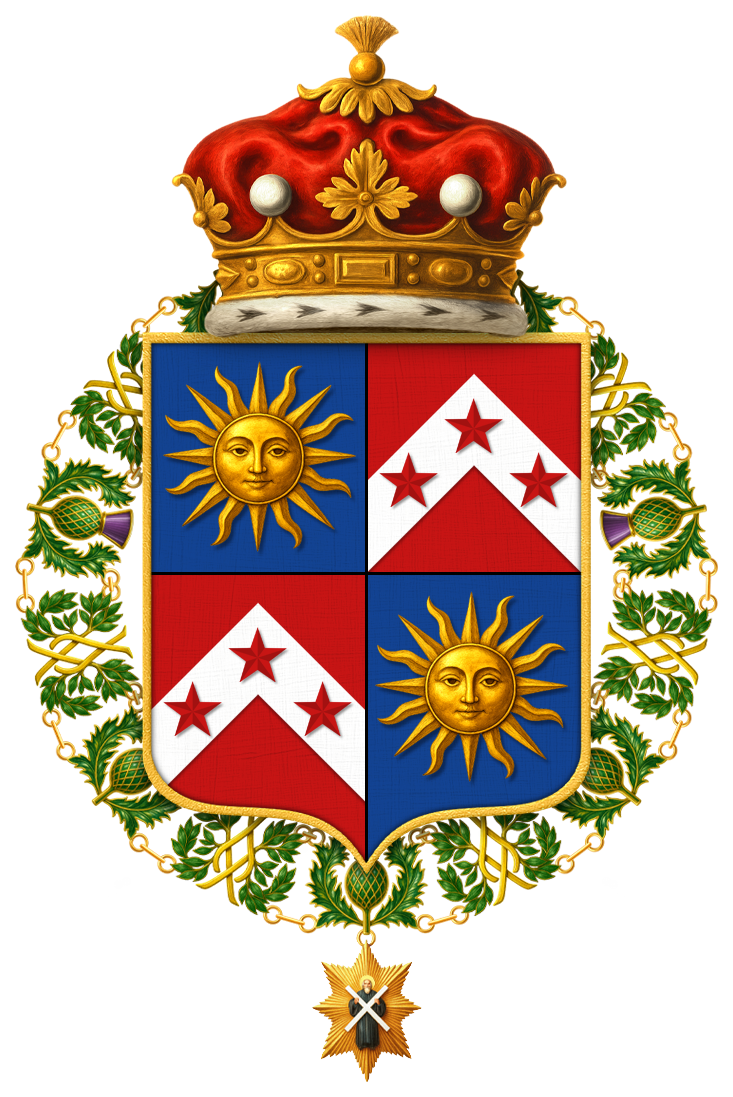
Shield of arms of William Kerr, 2nd Marquess of Lothian, KT, surmounting the collar of the Order of the Thistle

Lieutenant-General William Kerr, 2nd Marquess of Lothian, KT (1661 – 28 February 1722), known as Lord Newbattle from 1675 to 1692 and Lord Jedburgh from 1692 to 1703, was a Scottish peer who held a number of minor military and political offices.

== Life ==
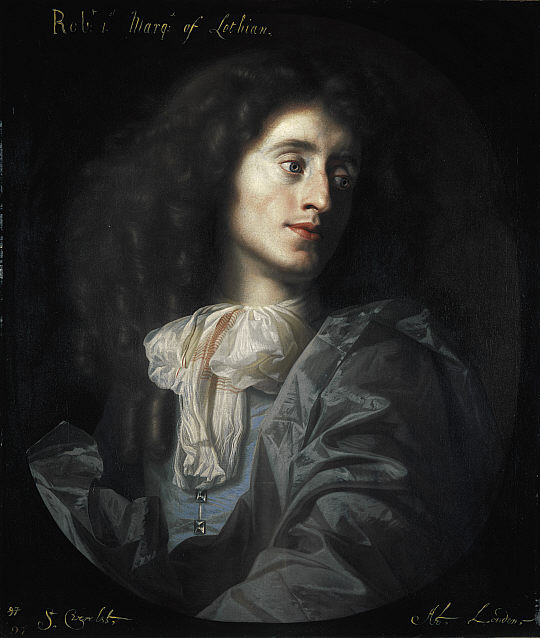
William's father, Robert Kerr

William Kerr was born in 1661, eldest son of Robert Kerr, Lord Newbattle (1636–1703, eldest son of William Kerr, 1st Earl of Lothian) and his wife, the former Lady Jean Campbell (d. 1700), daughter of the 1st Marquess of Argyll. Through their relationship with Argyll, the family was closely associated with Presbyterian and Whig interests and supported the 1688 Glorious Revolution.

Little is known of his early life but in June 1685, he married his first cousin (and his mother's namesake) Lady Jean Campbell (1661–1712), third daughter of the 9th Earl of Argyll (son of the 1st Marquess, whose marquessate had been forfeit), who was executed after the failed Argyll's Rising in June 1685. They had a son, William (later 3rd Marquess of Lothian, 1690–1767), and four daughters, Anne (died 1727), Jean (died March 1768), Elizabeth (died May 1758) and Mary (died 1768).

== Career ==
Under the title Lord Newbattle (which he had become on his father's succession as 2nd Earl of Lothian), he served as a Commissioner of Supply in 1685 and 1686 but his family's links to Argyll meant they were out of favour during the reign of James II & VII. Under William and Mary, he was Captain of an Independent Troop of Horse, ten of which were raised in April 1689 as a short-term response to the 1689-1691 Jacobite Rising. In 1691, these were re-organised as two regiments, Cunningham's Regiment, later 7th Dragoons and Lord Jedburgh's Dragoons, after he inherited the title Lord Jedburgh from a cousin in 1692. He sat under this name in the Parliament of Scotland until its dissolution in 1707.

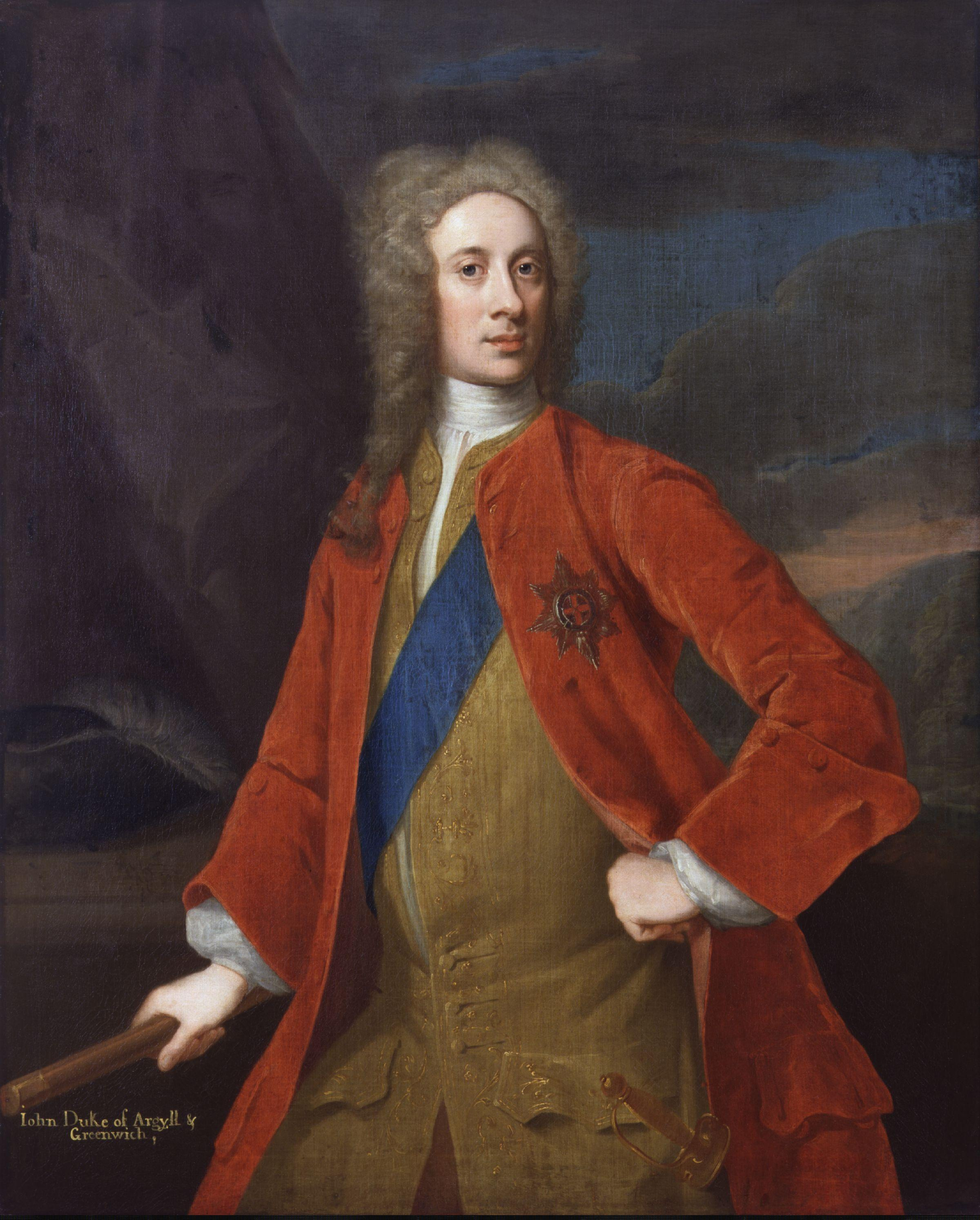
Lothian was a close political ally of his nephew, the Duke of Argyll, 1680-1743

Until 1694, when Richard Cunningham's regiment transferred to Flanders, these units were used for internal security and funded by the Scottish Parliament. After Cunningham was promoted Brigadier General, Jedburgh became Colonel of the 7th Dragoons in October 1696, but by now the Nine Years War was effectively over. Since regiments were named after their Colonel, for a few months there were two known as 'Lord Jedburgh's Dragoons;' the Scottish one was disbanded in October 1697, after the Treaty of Ryswick.

Until the 1868 Cardwell Reforms, commissions were private assets that could be bought or sold and did not require actual service. Though less common as soldiering became more professional, some Colonels remained civilians who delegated their duties to a subordinate. Jedburgh seems to have been one of these, as he has no record of active service, unlike his brothers Lord Mark Kerr and Lord John Kerr, who both commanded regiments of their own.

Despite this, he was promoted Brigadier when the War of the Spanish Succession began in 1702, while his father was created Marquess of Lothian and nominated a Commissioner for the proposed Union with England. He succeeded his father as Marquess after his death in 1703, was appointed Major General in 1704 and closely associated with his nephew, the 2nd Duke of Argyll in negotiations for the Acts of Union. In return, he was created a Knight of the Thistle in 1705 but lost influence when Argyll was replaced by the Duke of Queensberry as Lord High Commissioner.

In a summary of Scottish politicians prepared in 1704, the government agent John Macky described him as follows; "He hath abundance of fire, and may prove himself a man of business when he applies himself that way; laughs at all revealed religion, yet sets up for a pillar of Presbytery, and proves the surest card in their pack, being very zealous though not devout; he is brave in his person, loves his country and his bottle, a thorough libertine, very handsome, black, with a fine eye, forty-five years old."

When George Ramsay, Commander-in-Chief, Scotland and Colonel of the Scots Regiment of Foot Guards died in September 1705, Lothian wanted to replace him in both positions. However, the Earl of Leven became C-in-C instead while he was not appointed Colonel until April 1707.

He supported the Union and due to his connections with Argyll, was appointed Lieutenant General in 1708 and elected as one of the 16 Scottish Representative Peers for 1707 and 1708. However, he was removed from the House of Lords in 1709 after the vote was challenged, while the Tory landslide victory in the 1710 General Election meant the loss of his positions, including his Colonelcy in 1713. Although restored to the Lords after the accession of George I in 1715, he played little active part in politics; he died in 1722 and was buried in Westminster Abbey.

Military offices
Preceded by Richard Cunningham	Colonel of the 7th Regiment of Dragoons; 1696–1707	Succeeded by Lord Polwarth
Preceded by Hon. George Ramsay	Colonel of the Scots Regiment of Foot Guards; 1707–1713	Succeeded by Earl of Dunmore
Peerage of Scotland
Preceded by Robert Kerr	Marquess of Lothian; 1703–1722	Succeeded by William Kerr
Preceded by Robert Kerr	Lord Jedburgh; 1692–1722	Succeeded by William Kerr
