= Henry Cornwallis =

Henry Cornwallis may refer to:

- Henry Cornwallis (MP for Orford) (by 1532–99)
- Henry Cornwallis (MP for Eye) (1740–61)
