= William Kerr, 3rd Marquess of Lothian =

Scottish nobleman (c. 1690–1767)

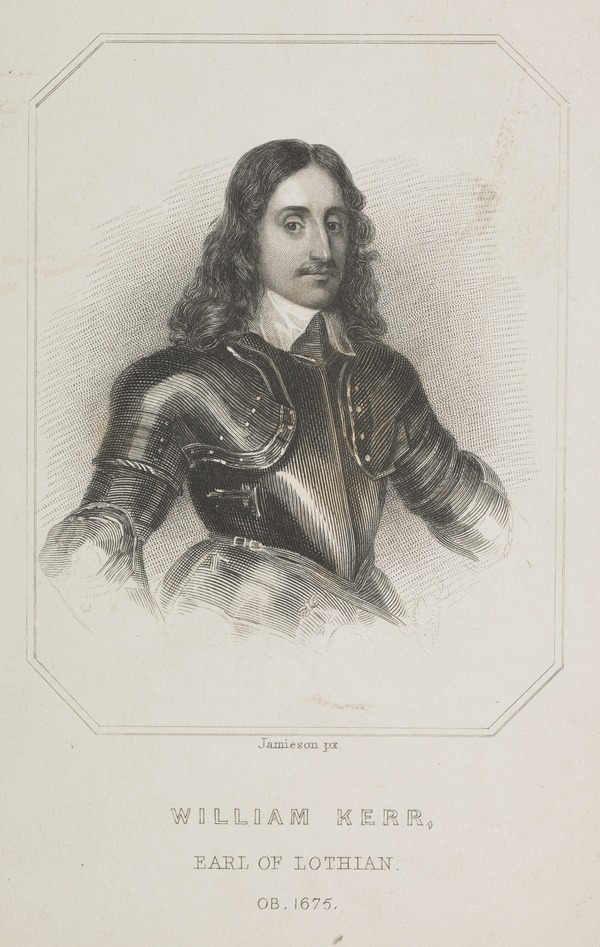
William Kerr, portrait

William Kerr, 3rd Marquess of Lothian, KT (c. 1690 – 28 July 1767) was a Scottish nobleman, styled Master of Jedburgh from 1692 to 1703 and Lord Jedburgh from 1703 to 1722. He served in the role of Lord Clerk Register.

== Early life ==
He was the son of William Kerr, 2nd Marquess of Lothian and Lady Jean Campbell.

== Career ==
Although his title of Lord Jedburgh is generally regarded as a courtesy title, he voted at the election of Scottish representative peers under that name in 1712.

He succeeded to the Marquessate of Lothian in 1722. He was elected a representative peer in 1731, sitting in the House of Lords until 1761. From 1732 to 1738, Lothian was Lord High Commissioner to the General Assembly of the Church of Scotland, and he was appointed a Knight of the Thistle in 1734. From 1739 until his resignation in 1756, he was Lord Clerk Register.

In Edinburgh, around 1750, the Marquess constructed a town house off the lower Canongate, close to Holyrood Palace, which was named Lothian Hut (House). This provided a more convenient lodging when requiring to attand the Scottish Parliament or other social events in the capital.

== Personal life ==
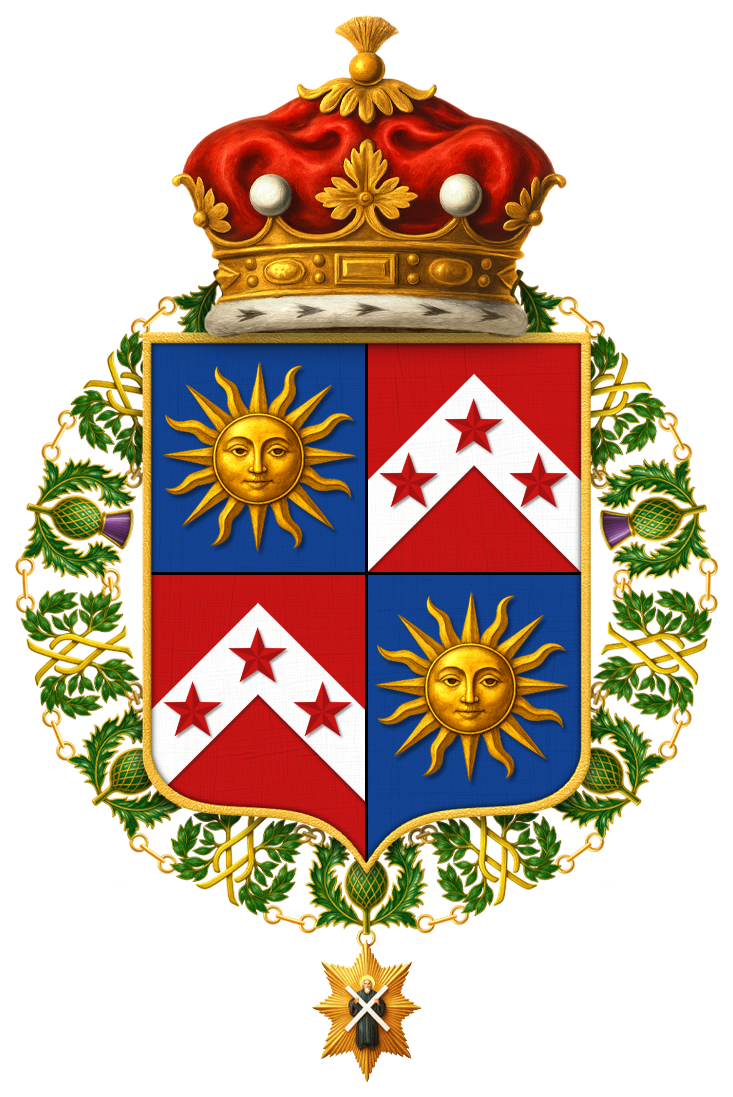
Shield of arms of William Kerr, 3rd Marquess of Lothian, KT, encircled by the collar of the Order of the Thistle

On 7 December 1711, he married Margaret Nicolson, daughter of Sir Thomas Nicolson, 1st Baronet, of Glenbervie, and his wife, Margaret (née Nicolson) Hamilton Nicolson. His wife's mother was previously married to James Hamilton of Ballincrieff, with whom she had Alexander Hamilton of Ballincrieff. They had three children:

- William Henry Kerr, 4th Marquess of Lothian (1710–1775)
- Lord Robert Kerr (d. 1746), who was killed at the Battle of Culloden.
- Lady Jane Kerr, who died young.

Lady Margaret died on 30 September 1759 at Newbattle Abbey and was buried there. William Kerr subsequently married his cousin, Jean Janet Kerr, daughter of Lord Charles Kerr of Cramond and Janet Murray, on 1 October 1760, by whom he had no issue.

== Death ==
Lothian died at Lothian House, Canongate, Edinburgh in 1767, and was buried at Newbattle Abbey. His second wife died at Lothian House twenty years later, on 26 December 1787.

Political offices
Preceded by The Earl of Loudoun	Lord High Commissioner to the General Assembly of the Church of Scotland; 1732–1738	Succeeded by The Earl of Hyndford
Preceded by The Earl of Selkirk	Lord Clerk Register; 1739–1756	Succeeded by Alexander Campbell
Peerage of Scotland
Preceded by William Kerr	Marquess of Lothian; 1722–1767	Succeeded by William Kerr
