= Archibald Cornwall =

Officer of Edinburgh's baillie court executed for treason

Archibald Cornwall (died 27 April 1601) was an officer of Edinburgh's baillie court. He was executed for treason for attempting to display royal portraits for sale on the town's gallows.

== Background ==
Archibald Cornwall is prominent in records of the Edinburgh Baillie's court which detail his weekly role as a court officer. He confiscated and marketed clothes and household goods belonging to defaulting debtors. Confiscated goods were displayed at the Mercat Cross on the Royal Mile and sold to the highest bidder, to reimburse creditors who had obtained an order called a "decreet" from the baillies. The Scots words for confiscation were "poynding" or "apprysing", the sale or auction, "comprysing", or a "roup". Cornwall also worked with the goldsmith George Heriot.

== Hanging the King and Queen's portraits ==
On 15 April 1601 Archibald was displaying confiscated household goods including the portraits of James VI of Scotland and Anne of Denmark at the cross and was seen to be standing on a table about to hang the pictures on two nails on the gallows or gibbet. He was stopped by a crowd of passers-by who threatened to stone him. The English diplomat George Nicholson wrote that displaying the paintings there was accounted "an ill presage" and a "dishonour to the king". Cornwall was arrested and later accused of the "Ignominious Dishonouring and Defaming of his Majesties". On 17 April Edinburgh Town Council passed an act against the sale of the portraits of the king or queen in private or public, and informed the king who was at Dalkeith Palace. Archibald was found guilty by an assize composed of Edinburgh tailors and condemned to be hung on Monday 27 April and remain on the same gibbet for 24 hours. Afterwards the gallows were burnt. On 19 June 1601 James VI restored his possessions to his widow Janet Cheyne by privy seal letter.

The Edinburgh diarist Robert Birrell recorded the execution, and also suggested that Cornwall was unpopular in Edinburgh, perhaps for auctioning townspeople's household goods;

He being an unmerciful greiddie creatur, he poyndit ane hones manis hous, and, amongst the rest, he poyndit the King and Queinis picturis, and quhen he came to the crosse to compryse the same he hung thame up on two naillis on the same gallowis

He being an unmerciful greedy creature, he confiscated an honest man's house, and among the rest, he took the King and Queen's pictures, and when he came to the Cross to auction them, he hung them on two nails on the gallows.

This harsh judgement and execution is usually regarded as motivated by the King's strong desire in these years to protect his reputation in the light of the English succession, beyond the usual limits of justice and equity, and has been linked with other cases where those who slandered him were executed. The case also shows that copies of Scottish royal portraits, now very rare, were not uncommon in Edinburgh houses. Portraits may have been made following the works of Adrian Vanson, the official court painter. Edinburgh town council ordered that in future royal portraits should not be auctioned, publicly or privately, as the result of a lawsuit.
