= Robert Kerr, 1st Marquess of Lothian =

Scottish nobleman (1636–1703)

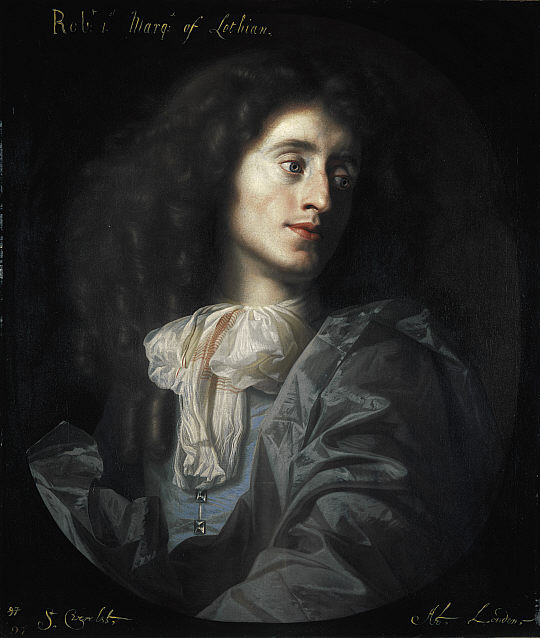
The 1st Marquess of Lothian.

Robert Kerr, 1st Marquess of Lothian PC (8 March 1636 – 15 February 1703), known as the 4th Earl of Lothian from 1675 to 1701, was a Scottish nobleman. He was styled Lord Kerr until 1661 and Lord Newbattle from 1661 to 1675.

The eldest son of William Kerr, 3rd Earl of Lothian and Anne Kerr, he was born at Newbattle Abbey, Midlothian. He left Scotland and was educated at Leyden, Saumur, and Angers from 1651 to 1657. He unsuccessfully claimed the earldom of Roxburghe in 1658. In 1661, his father lost an additional dispute with the new Earl of Roxburghe over the use of the courtesy title of Lord Kerr; it was reserved for Roxburghe's heir, and Kerr was thereafter styled Lord Newbattle.

Lord Newbattle was a volunteer in the Dutch War of 1673. He succeeded his father in the earldom in 1675. Sworn a Privy Counsellor in January 1686, he was removed by James II in September. Lothian supported the Glorious Revolution and sat in the Convention of Estates of Scotland. He was appointed Lord Justice General of Scotland in 1689, holding the office until his death, and was re-appointed a privy counsellor by William III in 1690. In the same year, he succeeded his uncle Charles as Earl of Ancram.

He was Lord High Commissioner to the Parliament of Scotland in 1692, and addressed the assembly with a speech advocating tolerance and liberality towards episcopal ministers wishing to be received into the Kirk, in harmony with the King's recommendations. However, the Assembly proved hostile, and the proposal was not taken up. He was created Marquess of Lothian on 23 June 1701, and was appointed Justice-General and a commissioner to treat for the union of Scotland and England in 1702. He did not see the project out, as he died in the following year.

== Personal life ==
Lothian married Lady Jean Campbell (d. 1700), daughter of Archibald Campbell, 1st Marquess of Argyll, in January 1660–1, by whom he had ten children:

- William Kerr, 2nd Marquess of Lothian (1661–1722)
- Lord Charles Kerr (d. 1735), appointed Director of Chancery in 1703, married Janet Murray, daughter of Sir David Murray, 2nd Baronet, and had issue
- Hon. Margaret Kerr (bap. 1670), died young
- Hon. Jean Kerr (bap. 1671), died young
- Lord John Kerr (bap. 1673 – 8 September 1735), British Army officer
- Lady Mary Kerr (bap. 1674 – 22 January 1736), married James Douglas, 2nd Marquess of Douglas
- Lord Mark Kerr (bap. 1676–1752), British general
- Lady Margaret Kerr (bap. 1678), died young
- Hon. James Kerr (bap. 1679), died unmarried
- Lady Annabella Kerr (bap. 1682), died young

Lothian also had a natural son, Captain John Kerr, who was slain at Douglas Castle by the Duke of Douglas.

He is buried in the family vault of Newbattle Church, Scotland.

Legal offices
Preceded by The Earl of Linlithgow	Lord Justice General; 1689–1703	Succeeded by The Viscount Tarbat
Peerage of Scotland
New creation	Marquess of Lothian; 1701–1703	Succeeded by William Kerr
Preceded by Anne Kerr	Earl of Lothian; 1st creation 1667–1703	Succeeded by William Kerr
Preceded by William Kerr	Earl of Lothian; 2nd creation 1675–1703	Succeeded by William Kerr
Preceded by Charles Kerr	Earl of Ancram; 1690–1703	Succeeded by William Kerr
