= Adrian Vanson =

Dutch-born Scottish portrait artist

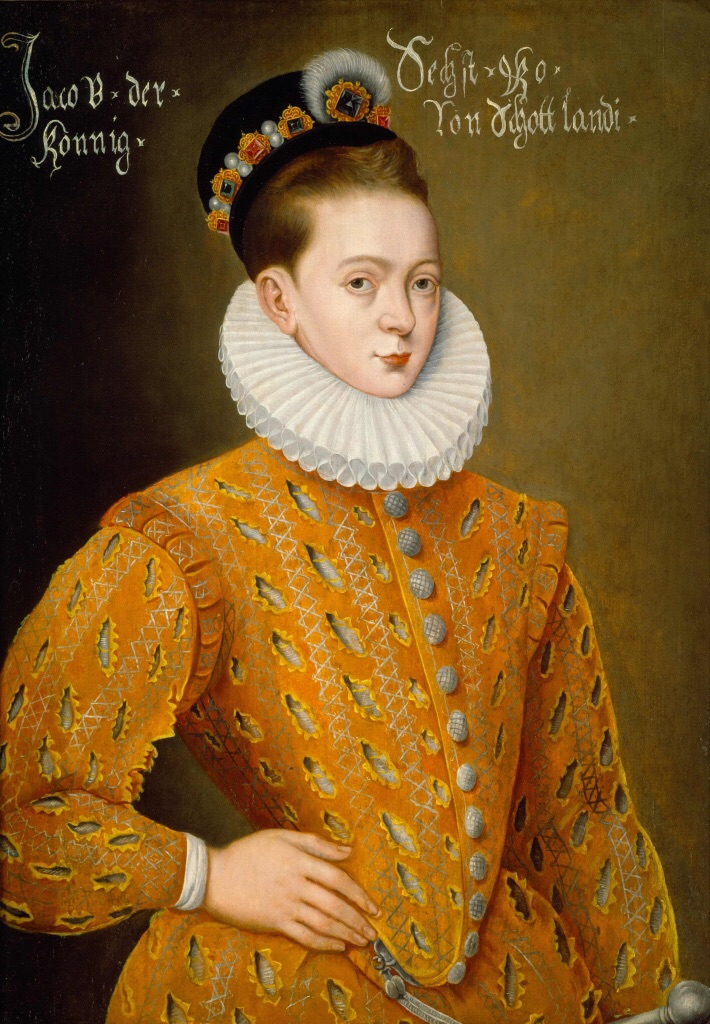
James VI, attributed to Adrian Vanson Edinburgh Castle

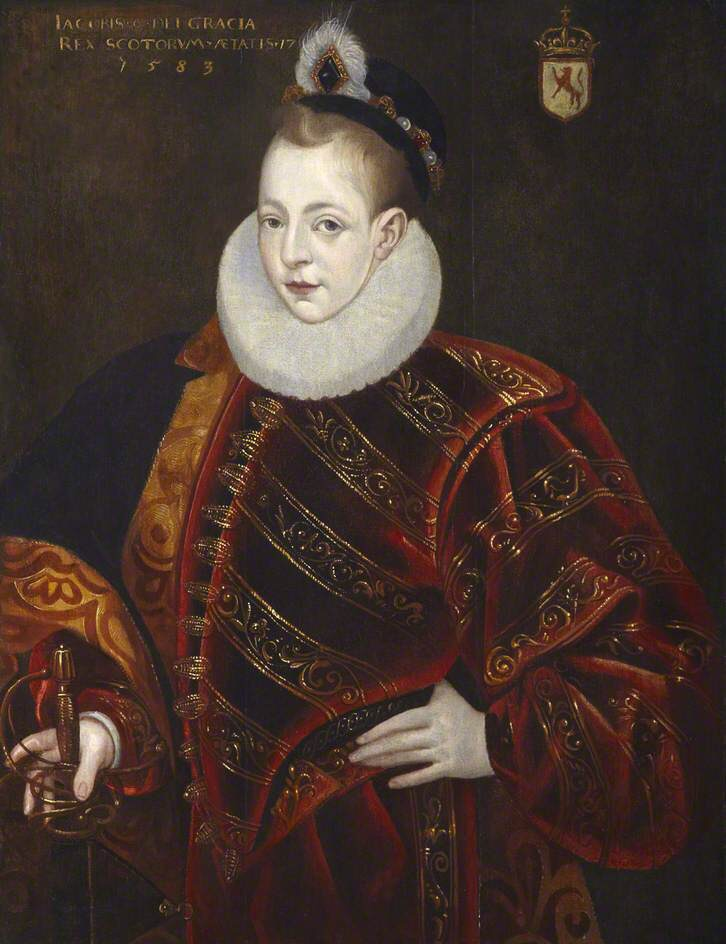
James VI, dated 1583, Dunfermline Carnegie Trust

Adrian Vanson (died c. 1602) was a portrait artist who worked for James VI of Scotland.

== Family and artistic background ==
Adrian was probably born in Breda, the son of Willem Claesswen van Son by Kathelijn Adriaen Matheus de Blauwverversdochter. His uncle or cousin Peter Mattheus or Matteusen was a painter in London.

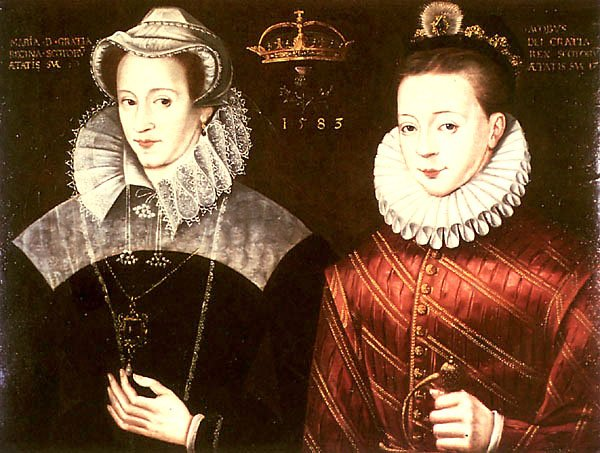
Mary, Queen of Scots and James VI, a double portrait made in 1583, Blair Castle.

Peter Matheeusen in his 1588 will left his cousin Adrian Vanson, named as "Adryan van Zont", portraits of his parents, Jacob and Agnes, and of himself, with a book The Arte concerning Lymning. Amongst the other bequests, Matheussen left money to the miniaturist Isaac Oliver and the painter Rowland Lockey, best known as a copyist working for Bess of Hardwick and her son the Earl of Devonshire.

In Edinburgh he signed his name "Adrian Van Son". His relative or brother Abraham Vanson was in Edinburgh working as a goldsmith, and married Jonet Gilbert, a daughter of the goldsmith Alexander Gilbert and niece of the goldsmith and financier Michael Gilbert. Abraham Vanson's daughter Helen was baptised on 4 May 1595.

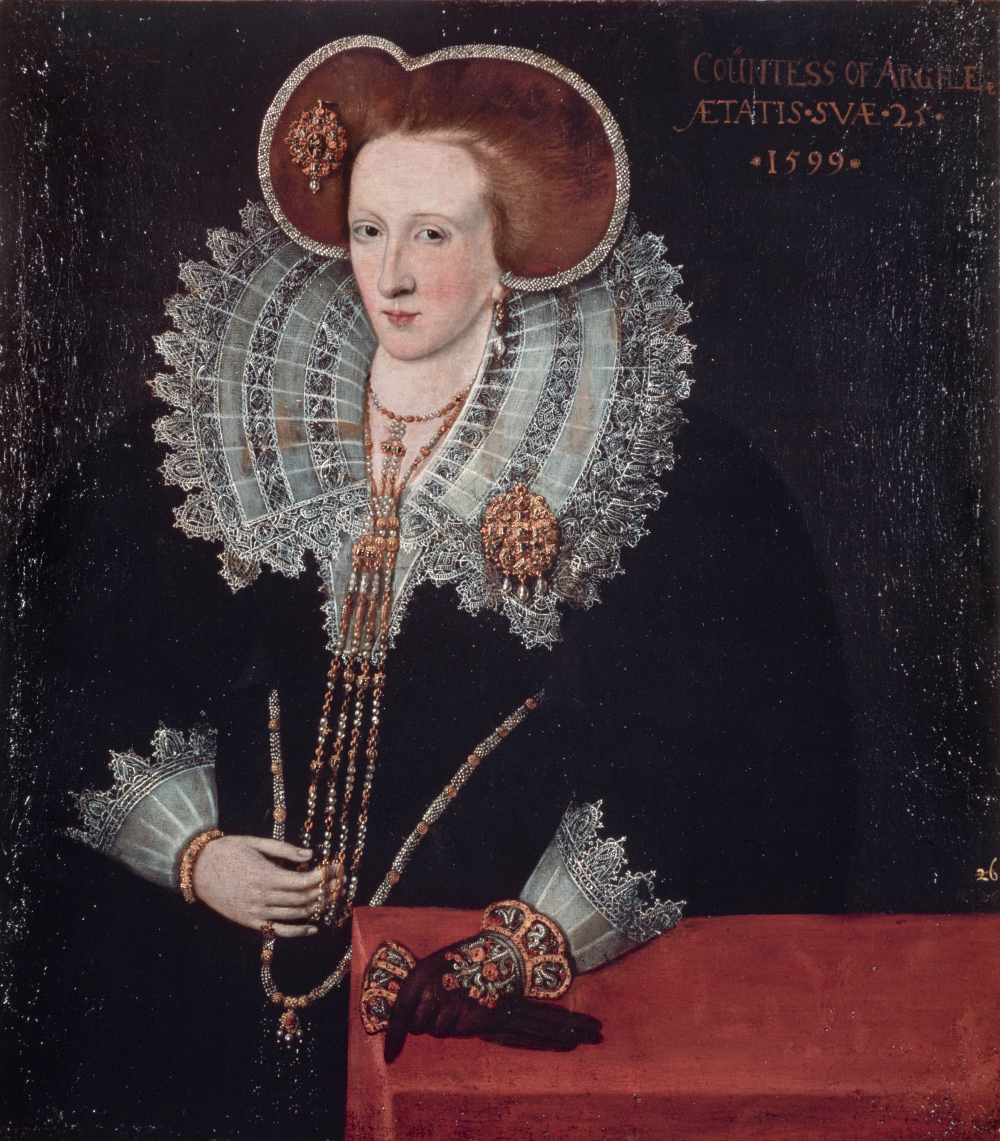
Agnes Douglas, attributed to Adrian Vanson National Galleries of Scotland

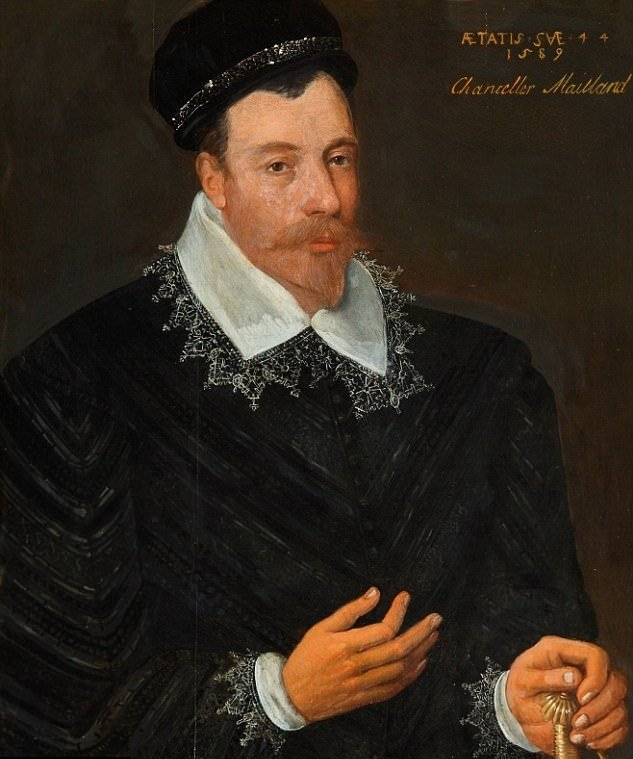
John Maitland of Thirlestane, attributed to Vanson, National Trust

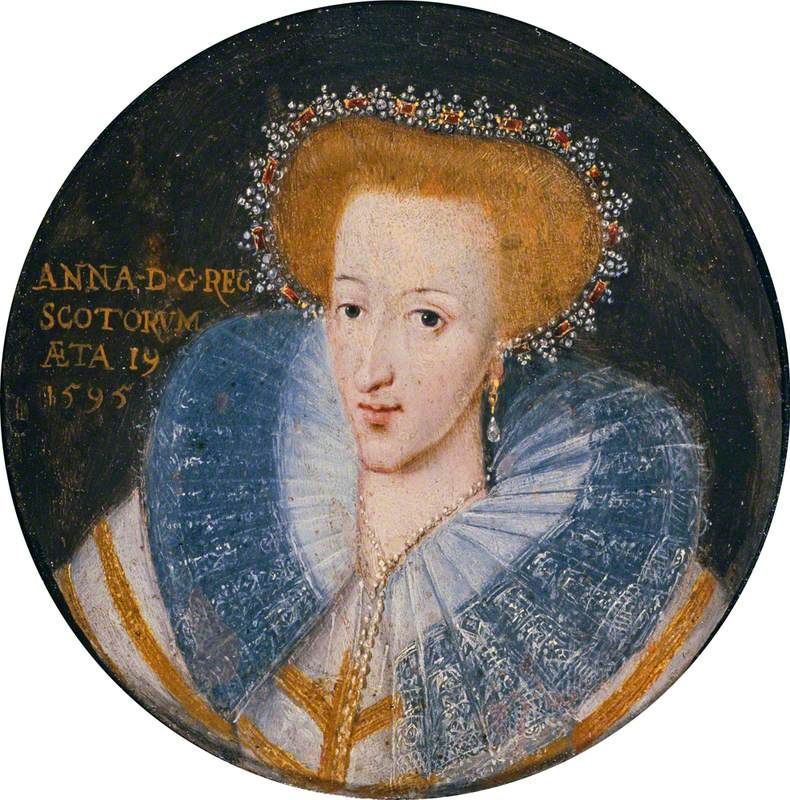
Anne of Denmark, 1595, circle of Adrian Vanson

== Career in Scotland ==
=== Portraits and engravings of George Buchanan and John Knox ===
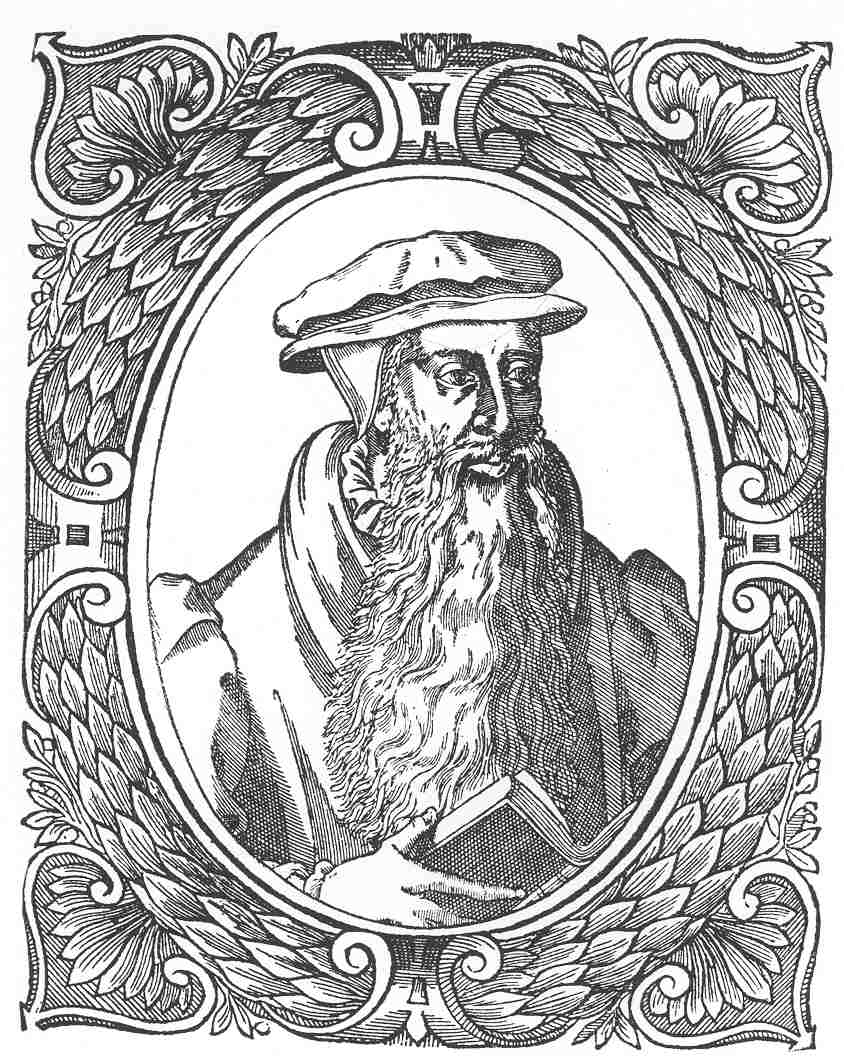
John Knox from Beza's Icones, after Adrian Vanson.

Portraits of John Knox and George Buchanan were sent to Geneva in November 1579 for inclusion as woodcuts in Theodore Beza's Icones (1580), but arrived too late for the book. According to a letter sent by the king's tutor Peter Young on 13 November 1579, the pictures were contained in a cylindrical box or case described as "una pyxide". Young also described Knox's appearance. A pair of later round portraits of James VI and Anne of Denmark attributed to Vanson fit together like a box, and perhaps this form may be related to Young's use of the word "pyxide".

Adrian Vanson's first recorded works for James VI in Scotland were two pictures to be sent to Theodore Beza in Geneva, for which he was paid £8-10s in June 1581. The woodcuts of Knox and James VI published in Simon Goulart's 1581 edition of the Icones are thought to follow Vanson's portraits. Another woodcut image of George Buchanan, not used in the Icones, but appearing in other works, has been attributed to Arnold Bronckorst. A portrait of John Knox held by the University of Edinburgh has been attributed to Adrian Vanson.

=== Lord Seton's painter ===
A letter sent to George Bowes in 1579 describes a Flemish painter making a portrait of James VI at Stirling Castle. The portrait was to be sent to England for Elizabeth I. Arnold Bronckhorst was appointed the king's painter on 19 September 1581. It seems that both Vanson and Bronckhorst worked at the Scottish court, and surviving portraits and records also suggest the presence of other unknown artists.

Vanson may perhaps have been "Lord Seton's painter", who was recorded drawing portraits of "his majesteis visage" for coins at the mint in Edinburgh in January 1581/1582, to be used by Thomas Foulis. Lord Seton had served as a diplomat and had various European contacts, and his third son John Seton of Barns had joined the household of the Earl of Leicester in England 1575.

=== 1583 and the double portrait ===
In October 1582, Mary, Queen of Scots, wrote to the French ambassador Michel de Castelnau in cipher code about a new type of portrait of James VI that he had sent her, presumably differing from the pictures made by Arnold Bronckorst. Probably in or after 1583, a French engraver, Jean Rabel, made engravings of a portrait resembling the paintings of James VI at Edinburgh Castle and at Dunfermline Carnegie Library and Galleries (dated 1583). A portrait of this type may have been made for a potential French bride for James, such as the Protestant Catherine of Bourbon and the Catholic Christina of Lorraine. The surviving paintings are attributed to Vanson, Bronckhorst, or an unknown artist. Rabel and Thomas de Leu worked for the French court and engraved Mary's portrait, the portraits of Castelnau and his wife Marie de Bochetel, and the Castelnau coat of arms. A double portrait of Mary and James, related to plans for their rule in "association" and dated 1583, has a similar depiction of James' face and bonnet.

=== King's painter ===
Adrian Vanson succeeded Arnold Bronckhorst as "King's painter" in Scotland in May 1584. His appointment and yearly fee of £100 was confirmed by privy seal letter on 20 August 1584. When he was made a burgess of Edinburgh on 30 December 1585, it was hoped he would teach his craft to apprentices. No records of apprentices, or a workshop have been found. Vanson did not join the Edinburgh craft of Mason and Wrights, which welcomed painter-glaziers. However, technical investigation of portraits thought to be in the Vanson oeuvre reveal a variety of technique, pointing to the work of more than one artist, either in his or other workshops.

Attributed portraits include James VI; Anne of Denmark; Patrick Lyon, Lord Glamis; Sir Thomas Kennedy of Culzean; Agnes Douglas, Countess of Argyll. Vanson's James VI of circa 1585 survives at Edinburgh castle. Some pictures are known through later copies or imitations, including a portrait of James Anstruther originally painted in 1591.

=== The only painter in Edinburgh ===
Mary, Queen of Scots requested a full size portrait of James VI drawn from life in April 1586. In May, a French ambassador in Scotland, the Baron d'Esneval, promised to get Mary, Queen of Scots a copy of a recent portrait of James VI from the only painter in Edinburgh, presumably meaning Vanson. James sent Peter Young and Colonel William Stewart to Denmark to discuss his potential marriage on 20 July. It is sometimes suggested that the picture at Edinburgh Castle, which has an inscription in German, was made by Vanson for this embassy or a similar purpose. Another portrait now at Falkland Palace is dated 1586 and may have been made to send abroad.

=== Maitland and the hidden portrait of Mary ===
A portrait of John Maitland of Thirlestane by Vanson at Ham House was valued at £2 in 1683. Examination by Caroline Rae in 2016 showed that it was painted over an image of Mary, Queen of Scots.

=== Banners and heraldry ===
Vanson also painted heraldry on banners for the king's trumpeters, and ceremonial spears and banners and painted the Danish royal arms on banners for the coronation of Anne of Denmark. He also painted a taffeta banner or pencel for the Hammermen craft for Anne's Entry to Edinburgh.

King James referred to portraiture and the art of the painting by alluding to Saint Luke, patron of painters, in his sonnet To the Queene:

Your loving lookes may make me calme to be
How oft yow see me have an heavie hart
Remember then sweete Doctour on your art.

=== Gold portrait medallions ===
James Melville of Halhill mentioned that gold medals with the portrait of James VI were given to Danish diplomats after the coronation of Anne of Denmark in 1590. Painted portraits of Prince Henry were given to ambassadors at his christening in August 1594.

James VI had gold medals with his and Anna of Denmark's portraits made, which he gave to the ambassadors after the baptism. The medals presumably followed portrait patterns provided by Vanson, and James VI gave an example to Vanson worth 20 gold crowns on 3 October 1594.

The goldsmith George Heriot was paid for a gold chain with the portrait of James VI, a medal or a miniature, which was given to an envoy of the Duke of Mecklenburg. The courtier Magdalen Livingstone owned a locket with a portrait of Anne of Denmark "raised" in gold. In England, James commissioned medallions with his portrait from the artist Nicholas Hilliard.

=== Vanson's ship ===
Adrian Vanson was involved in a shipping case in May 1594. A "Flemish barque" was impounded at Montrose on 26 April, suspected of bringing money to aid the Catholic earls, and brought to Leith. The English diplomat Robert Bowes heard that the sailors had offered to pay for a pilot and for lodgings in Montrose with Spanish money, raising suspicions, and a messenger had carried letters and gold from the ship to Aberdeen and Huntly Castle.

Vanson acted with the Dutch diplomat Adrian Damman to free the Flemish sailors. They made a bond of £1000 Scots to release the skipper, Hendrick Michelsoun of Middelburg, Zeeland, from the Tolbooth of Edinburgh into house arrest. Vanson and Damman also put up a bond of £2000 "making caution" for Peter Herimansoun and Peter Mattiesoun, two sailors who had arrived in the ship at Montrose. The sailors were to remain in Edinburgh, Canongate, or Leith until the issues were settled. The Privy Council gave orders that the ship was to remain at Leith.

Robert Bowes called the ship a "Flanders pink", and was convinced that the gold had boosted the confidence of the Earl of Huntly and his allies. He came to believe that a Spanish aristocrat had landed at Montrose as a potential diplomat. At the end of July 1594, James VI told Bowes that he written to Elizabeth I about the passengers on the Montrose ship and another suspicious ship that had recently come to Aberdeen. The second ship brought the Jesuit James Gordon to Scotland.

Adrian Vanson seems to have become the owner of a ship called The Sun. On 20 November 1594, James VI issued a privy seal letter or "privilege" declaring that his painter was the owner of the ship and the Master was John Johnson, a resident in France. The Latin document was addressed to Hadrianum Wansonium pictorem nostrum. It belonged to an antiquary John Pinkerton in 1799 and its present location is unknown. In 1593, a John Johnson was recorded as Master of The Sampson of "Olre in Holland" and made a claim for a lost cargo of oil, wine, salt, and Spanish money. In 1589, John Johnson was Master of the Jonas of Amsterdam.

It is not clear if the "Flemish barque" was The Sun (or The Sampson) mentioned in Vanson's "privilege" in November. The incident at Montrose prompted Elizabeth I to send James VI a generous subsidy of £3000 in July 1594 with a further £2000 in November.

=== Anne of Denmark ===
Christian IV of Denmark requested full length portraits of James VI and Anne of Denmark to add to a series of pictures of his relatives in October 1597. It is not known if this request was granted. The execution of Archibald Cornwall in April 1601 for attaching royal portraits to the gallows suggests that pictures of the king and Anne of Denmark were common household objects in Edinburgh. Miniature portraits were also made in Edinburgh, the stock of a goldsmith, the younger John Mosman, in 1593 included a "tablet" or locket with the portraits of James VI and Anne of Denmark worth £57 Scots.

The ambassador Edward Bruce brought portraits of King James and Prince Henry to England in January 1600. In December 1601 Vanson was paid £20 Scots for a portrait of Anne of Denmark. Around the same time the goldsmith George Heriot made a chain with a miniature portrait of James as a diplomatic gift for an ambassador from the Duke of Mecklenburg, the queen's uncle. Although Vanson was still active, the Duke of Lennox later claimed that he had not been able to find a portrait painter in Scotland to send pictures of the royal family to the Venetian ambassador.

=== Arch in London ===
In 1604 Vanson worked with other painters on a triumphal arch for the king's ceremonial entry to London, commissioned by the Dutch community. The arches and entry were planned for the coronation in 1603 but the project was deferred a year because of the plague in London.

The text of a commemorative publication with engravings of the Dutch arch, the Beschryvinghe vande herlycke Arcus Triumphal Coninck Iacobo (Middelburg, 1604), by Conraet Jansen identifies him as "Adrian van Sond" of Breda, painter to the king. Collaborators included the painter Martin Droeshout, and Michael Droeshout (father of the engraver Martin Droeshout) may have made the published engravings in the Beschryinghe. Another source attributes the iconographic program, the choice of images and texts on the arch, to Assueros Regemonter, Christopher de Stuer, and Jacob Cool.

== Death ==
The date of his death is unknown. After Adrian Vanson's death, in 1610 and 1616 his widow Susanna petitioned the king for outstanding payments.

== Marriage, family, and the Flemish community ==
Adrian Vanson married Susanna de Colonia at Dordrecht on 31 March 1577. She became an active business woman in Edinburgh. Her brother was the portrait painter Adam de Colone. Their father Louis Jansz. Colonia was a saddle maker.

Their children included:

- Adrian Vanson, who was christened on 19 October 1595, the witnesses were the Flemish ambassador Adrian Damman de Bystervelt and Adrian Bowdowingis, a clockmaker. On 26 October 1600 Adrian Bowdowingis christened his son Adrian, and Adrian Damman and Adrian Vanson were witnesses.
- Susanna Vanson,
- James Vanson
- Frederick Vanson, baptised 2 September 1601, the witnesses were Guiliams Vansone and Peter Ziber.

== Footnotes ==
Preceded by Arnold Bronckorst	Painter at the Scottish royal court 1581–1602	Succeeded by Jacob de Wet
