= Marquess of Lothian =

Title in the Peerage of Scotland

Marquessate of Lothian
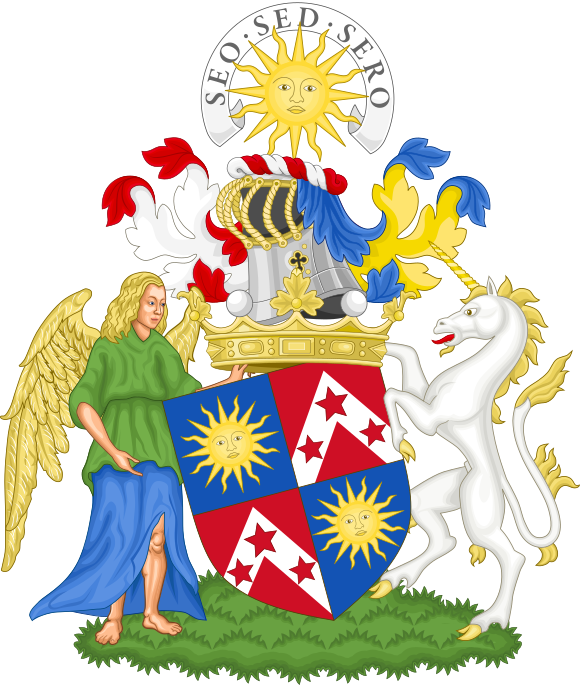
- Arms: Quarterly: 1st & 4th, Azure, a Sun-in-Splendour proper (Lothian, as a coat of augmentation); 2nd & 3rd, Gules, on a Chevron Argent, three Mullets Gules (Kerr of Jedburgh). Crests: 1st, A Sun-in-Splendour proper (Lothian); 2nd, A Stag's Head cabossed Argent (Kerr of Jedburgh). Supporters: Dexter: An Angel proper, vested Azure, surcoated Vert, winged and crined Or; Sinister: A Unicorn Argent, armed crined and unguled Or, gorged with a Collar Gules, charged with three Mullets Argent.
- Creation date: 23 June 1701
- Created by: William III & II
- Peerage: Peerage of Scotland
- First holder: Robert Kerr, 4th Earl of Lothian
- Present holder: Ralph Kerr, 14th Marquess of Lothian
- Heir apparent: John Kerr, Earl of Ancram
- Remainder to: Heirs male whatsoever
- Subsidiary titles: Earl of Lothian; Earl of Ancram (1633); Earl of Ancram (1701); Viscount of Briene; Lord Newbattle; Lord Jedburgh; Lord Kerr of Newbattle; Lord Kerr of Nisbet, Langnewtoun, and Dolphinstoun
- Status: Extant
- Seat: Ferniehirst Castle Melbourne Hall
- Former seats: Newbattle Abbey; Blickling Hall
- Motto: SERO SED SERIO (Late, but in earnest)

Marquess of Lothian is a title in the Peerage of Scotland, which was created in 1701 for Robert Kerr, 4th Earl of Lothian. The Marquess of Lothian holds the subsidiary peerages of Earl of Lothian (created 1606 and 1631), Earl of Ancram (created 1633 and 1701), Viscount of Briene (1701), Lord Newbattle (1591), Lord Jedburgh (1622), Lord Kerr of Newbattle (1631), Lord Kerr of Nisbet, Langnewtoun, and Dolphinstoun (1633), Lord Kerr of Newbattle, Oxnam, Jedburgh, Dolphinstoun and Nisbet (1701), and Baron Ker, of Kersheugh in the County of Roxburgh (1821), all but the last in the Peerage of Scotland. As the Lord Ker in the Peerage of the United Kingdom, previous marquesses sat in the House of Lords before 1963, when Scottish peers first sat in the House of Lords in their own right. The holder of the marquessate is also the Chief of Clan Kerr.

The 13th Marquess of Lothian was better known as the Conservative politician Michael Ancram. In November 2010, he received a life peerage as Baron Kerr of Monteviot and so became entitled to sit in the House of Lords. He lived at Monteviot House in Roxburghshire. The family previously owned a larger Scottish seat, Newbattle Abbey in Midlothian, which is now a college, and also Blickling Hall in Norfolk, which now belongs to the National Trust.

The 14th and current Marquess is Ralph Kerr, brother of the 13th Marquess. He owns Ferniehirst Castle in Roxburghshire, which is the family seat that was restored by the 12th Marquess, and Melbourne Hall in Derbyshire. The heir apparent is his eldest son John.

== History of the titles ==
Clan Kerr has several branches. The name "Kerr," from the Old Norse "kjrr" meaning "marsh-dweller," arrived in Scotland from Normandy. In Scotland it was rendered Kerr, Ker, Carr and Carre, with a Scottish variant on the west coast taken from the Gaelic "ciar," meaning dusky. According to the lore of the family of Mark Kerr, 1st Earl of Lothian, the name comes from the Norman chiefs Ralph and Robert, brothers who came to Roxburgh from Lancashire in the 1300s.

The Kerrs of Ferniehurst claim descent from Ralph, while the Kerrs of Cessford claim they are descended from Robert. These two main branches of Clan Kerr were often at odds with one another, fighting until they came together in the early 1500s. The Kerrs subsequently also warred with the Scott Clan, until the feud ended when Sir Thomas Kerr of Ferniehurst married Janet Scott. In a 1591 charter of King James V, Mark Kerr had his lands at Newbattle and Prestongrange erected into the barony of Newbattle.

=== 1st title ===
Mark Kerr was created Lord Newbattle in 1591 and Earl of Lothian in 1606, both with remainder to his heirs male. The title went to the eldest of his four sons, Robert Kerr, 2nd Earl of Lothian. In 1621 both titles were surrendered by the 2nd Earl and regranted with a special remainder to his daughters, the eldest of whom, Lady Anne Kerr, succeeded to both titles on his death in 1624. Her husband, Sir William Kerr (eldest son of Sir Robert Kerr, later 1st Earl of Ancram) was created Lord Kerr of Newbattle and Earl of Lothian in 1631. On her death in 1667 their eldest son became 4th Earl of Lothian (though he was not recognised as such) and on her husband's death in 1675 also 2nd Earl of Lothian.

=== 2nd title as Marquess ===
By this point Sir Robert Kerr, father of the 1st Earl of the 2nd creation, had been created Lord Kerr of Nisbet, Langnewtoun and Dolphinstoun and Earl of Ancram, and the titles had been inherited by the 4th and 2nd Earl of Lothian's uncle, Charles Kerr, on whose death in 1690 he became 3rd Earl of Ancram.

He was then created Lord Ker of Newbattle, Oxnam, Jedburgh, Dolphinstoun and Nisbet, Viscount of Briene, Earl of Ancram and Marquess of Lothian in 1701.

The 2nd Marquess succeeded his cousin as Lord Jedburgh before succeeding to the Marquessate, and the 6th Marquess was created Baron Ker, of Kersheugh in the County of Roxburgh, in 1821, in the Peerage of the United Kingdom.

== Earls of Lothian; First creation (1606) ==
- Mark Kerr, 1st Earl of Lothian (1553–1609)
- Robert Kerr, 2nd Earl of Lothian (died 1624)
- Anne Kerr, 3rd Countess of Lothian (died 1667)
- Robert Kerr, 4th and 2nd Earl of Lothian and 3rd Earl of Ancram (1636–1703) (created Marquess of Lothian in 1701)

== Earls of Lothian; Second creation (1631) ==
- William Kerr, 1st Earl of Lothian (1605–1675)
- The Earldom was inherited by the 4th Earl of the first creation (see above).

== Lords Jedburgh (1621/2) ==
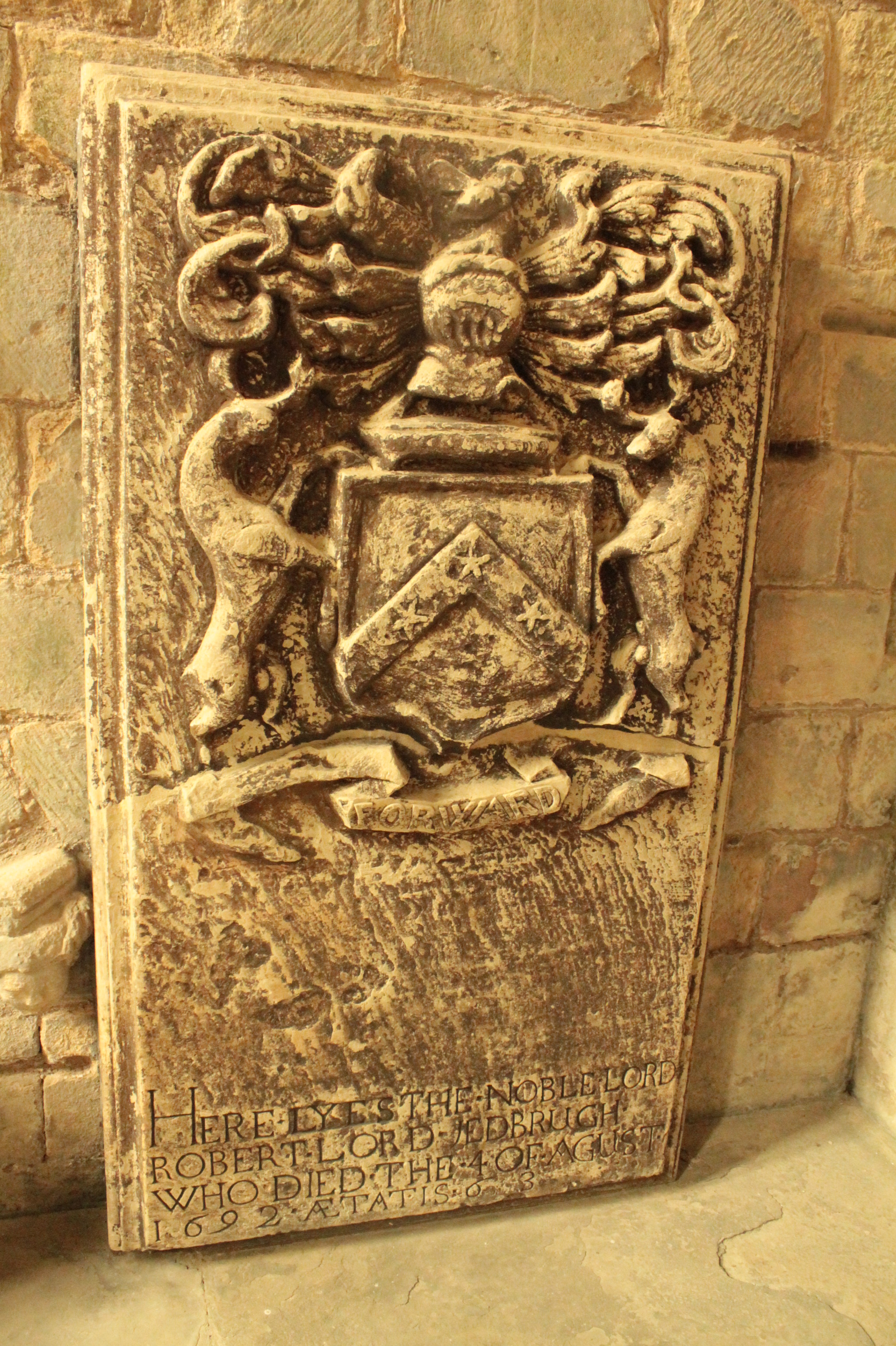
The grave of Robert Ker, Lord Jedburgh d.1692, Jedburgh Abbey

- Andrew Ker, 1st Lord Jedburgh (died 1633)
- Alexander Kirkaldy later Ker, de jure 2nd Lord Jedburgh (c. 1590 – c 1650)
- John Ker, de jure 3rd Lord Jedburgh (died before 1670)
- Robert Ker, 4th Lord Jedburgh (died 1692)
- William Ker, 5th Lord Jedburgh (1661-1722); later 2nd Marquess of Lothian (title held by the Marquesses of Lothian from 1703- see below)

== Earls of Ancram (1633) ==
- Robert Kerr, 1st Earl of Ancram (1578–1654)
- Charles Kerr, 2nd Earl of Ancram (died 1690)
- The Earldom was inherited by the 4th and 2nd Earl of Lothian (see above).

== Marquesses of Lothian (1701) ==
- Robert Kerr, 1st Marquess of Lothian (1636–1703)
- William Kerr, 2nd Marquess of Lothian (1661–1722)
- William Kerr, 3rd Marquess of Lothian (1690–1767)
- William Henry Kerr, 4th Marquess of Lothian (1713–1775)
- William John Kerr, 5th Marquess of Lothian (1737–1815)
- William Kerr, 6th Marquess of Lothian (1763–1824)
- John William Robert Kerr, 7th Marquess of Lothian (1794–1841)
- William Schomberg Robert Kerr, 8th Marquess of Lothian (1832–1870)
- Schomberg Henry Kerr, 9th Marquess of Lothian (1833–1900)
- Robert Schomberg Kerr, 10th Marquess of Lothian (1874–1930)
- Philip Henry Kerr, 11th Marquess of Lothian (1882–1940)
- Peter Francis Walter Kerr, 12th Marquess of Lothian (1922–2004)
- Michael Andrew Foster Jude Kerr, 13th Marquess of Lothian (1945–2024)
- Ralph William Francis Joseph Kerr, 14th Marquess of Lothian (born 1957)

== Present peer ==
Ralph William Francis Joseph Kerr, 14th Marquess of Lothian (born on 7 November 1957) is the son of the 12th Marquess of Lothian and his wife Loris Antonella Thomasa Newland. He was educated at Ampleforth College.

On 6 September 1980, as Lord Ralph Kerr he married firstly Lady Virginia Mary Elizabeth FitzRoy, daughter of Hugh FitzRoy, 11th Duke of Grafton. They were divorced in 1987, and in 1988 Ancram married secondly Marie-Claire Black, daughter of Michael Donald Gordon Black and Priscilla Holt. With her he has six children:

- John Walter Donald Peter Kerr, Earl of Ancram (born 1988)
- Lord Frederick James Michael Ralph Kerr (1989)
- Lord Francis Andrew William George Kerr (1991)
- Lady Amabel Amy Antonella Kerr (1995)
- Lady Minna Alice Priscilla Elizabeth Kerr (1998)
- Lord Hugh Alexander Thomas Joseph Kerr (1999)

Ancram was admitted to the Royal Company of Archers and in 2003 lived at Melbourne Hall, Derbyshire. On 1 October 2024 he succeeded his brother as Baron Ker of Kersheugh (1821); Lord Jedburgh (1622); Lord of Ker of Newbottle (1701); Viscount of Briene (1701); Marquess of Lothian (1701); Earl of Ancram (1701); on Earl of Ancrame (1633); Lord Kerr of Nisbet, Langnewtoun and Dolphinstoun (1633); Earl of Lothian (1631); and Lord Ker of Newbattle (1631).

The heir apparent is the present peer's son John Walter Donald Peter Kerr, Earl of Ancram (born 1988).

== Family tree and succession ==
Kerr (Ker) family tree: Marquesses of Lothian 1701, Earls of Lothian 1606, Earls of Lothian 1631, Earls of Ancram 1633, Lords Jedburgh 1621

? Douglas; First Wife	Andrew Kerr of Altonburn and Cessford	Margaret Tweedle; Second Wife
Walter Kerr of Cessford d. 1501	Thomas Ker d. 1484; 1st of Fiernhirst
Robert Kerr the Younger d. 1500
Andrew Kerr of Cessford d. 1526 (Note: The 1st Earl of Roxburghe is also a descendant great-grandson of Andrew Kerr of Cessford through his first son, Walter Kerr of Cessford (brother of Mark Kerr).)	Andrew Ker of Fiernhirst d. 1545
Mark Kerr d. 1584	Robert Ker d. 1588	John Ker d. 1562
Lord Newbattle, 1591; Earl of Lothain (1st creation), 1606	Lord Ledburgh, 1621
Mark Ker; 1st Earl of Lothian (1606), etc. 1553–1609	William Kerr of Ancram d. 1590	Andrew Ker d. c. 1633; 1st Lord Jedburgh	William Ker	James Ker of Craling d. 1645
Earl of Ancram and Lord Kerr of Nisbet, Langnewtoun and Dolphinstoun, 1633
Robert Kerr d. 1624; 2nd Earl of Lothian (1606), etc.	Elizabeth Murray (First Wife)	Robert Kerr; 1st Earl of Ancram, etc. 1578–1654 (Note: The creation of the Earldom of Ancram had a special remainder where the title went first to the heirs male of Robert Kerr by his second wife, Anne Portman (nee Stanley), and then to his heirs male general. As a result, his eldest son of his second marriage succeeded to the title upon his death. When the male line of the 1st Earl's second marriage became extinct, the title reverted to the male line of the 1st Earl's first marriage and the 2nd Earl's nephew, later the 1st Marquess of Lothian, succeeded to the title.)	Anne Portman (Second Wife)	Alexander Ker c. 1598 – c. 1650; 2nd Lord Jedburgh de jure
Lordship Newbattle and Earldom of Lothian (1606) surrendered, 1621
Earl of Lothain (1st creation) regranted, 1624	Lord Kerr of Newbattle and Earl of Lothain (2nd creation), 1631
Anne Kerr d. 1677; 3rd Countess of Lothian (1606), etc. de jure (Note: There has been some confusion as to whether Anne Kerr actually acceded to the title or whether it reverted to the Crown. The estates of her father did pass to her as she did fulfill the terms of her father's will that she marry a member of the clan Kerr. Her husband was granted a new title of Earl of Lothian. Their son did assume the 1631 creation of the Lothian Earldom, but he never did assume the 1601 creation and titles held by the current Marquess of Lothian do not include the 1601 creation.)	William Kerr c. 1605–1675; 1st Earl of Lothian (1631)	Charles Kerr; 2nd Earl of Ancram, etc. 1624–1690	John Ker d. c. 1670; 3rd Lord Jedburgh de jure	Robert Ker d. c. 1692; 4th Lord Jedburgh
Marquess of Lothian, Viscount of Briene, and Lord Ker of Newbattle, Oxnam, Jedburgh, Dolphinstoun and Nisbet, 1701
Robert Kerr; 1st Marquess of Lothian, etc., 4th Earl of Lothian (1606), etc., 2nd Earl of Lothian (1631), 3rd Earl of Ancram, etc. 1636–1703
William Kerr; 2nd Marquess of Lothian, etc., 5th Lord Jedburgh; 1661–1721/22
William Kerr c. 1690–1767; 3rd Marquess of Lothian, etc.
William Henry Kerr; 4th Marquess of Lothian, etc. 1710–1775
William John Kerr; 5th Marquess of Lothian, etc. 1737–1815
Baron Ker of Kersehugh in the County of Roxburgh, 1821
William Kerr; 6th Marquess of Lothian, etc. 1763–1824
John William Robert Kerr; 7th Marquess of Lothian, etc. 1794–1841
William Schomberg Kerr; 8th Marquess of Lothian, etc. 1832–1870	Schomberg Henry Kerr; 9th Marquess of Lothian, etc. 1833–1900	Ralph Drury Kerr; 1837–1916	Walter Talbot Kerr; 1839–1927
Walter William Schomberg Kerr; 1867–1892 styled Earl of Ancram	Robert Schomberg Kerr; 10th Marquess of Lothian, etc. 1874–1930	Philip Henry Kerr; 11th Marquess of Lothian, etc. 1862–1940	Ralph Francis Kerr; 1874–1932	Andrew William Kerr; 1877–1929
Peter Francis Walter Kerr; 12th Marquess of Lothian, etc. 1922–2004
Michael Andrew Foster Jude Kerr; 13th Marquess of Lothian, etc. 1945–2024	Ralph William Francis Joseph Kerr; 14th Marquess of Lothian b. 1957
John Walter Donald Peter Kerr b. 1988; Heir Apparent	Frederick James Michael Ralph Kerr b. 1989	Francis Andrew William George Kerr b. 1991	Hugh Alexander Thomas Joseph Kerr b. 1999

Line of succession (simplified)
- William Kerr, 5th Marquess of Lothian (1737–1815)
  - William Kerr, 6th Marquess of Lothian (1763–1824)
    - John Kerr, 7th Marquess of Lothian (1794–1841)
      - William Kerr, 8th Marquess of Lothian (1832–1870)
      - Schomberg Kerr, 9th Marquess of Lothian (1833–1900)
        - Robert Kerr, 10th Marquess of Lothian (1874–1930)
      - Major General Lord Ralph Drury Kerr (1837–1916)
        - Philip Kerr, 11th Marquess of Lothian (1882–1940)
      - Lord Walter Talbot Kerr (1839-1927)
        - Andrew William Kerr (1877-1929)
          - Peter Kerr, 12th Marquess of Lothian (1922–2004)
            - Michael Kerr, 13th Marquess of Lothian, Lord Kerr of Monteviot (1945–2024)
            - Ralph Kerr, 14th Marquess of Lothian (b. 1957)
              - (1) John Walter Donald Peter Kerr, Earl of Ancram (b. 1988)
              - (2) Lord Frederic James Michael Ralph Kerr (b. 1989)
              - (3) Lord Francis Andrew William George Kerr (b. 1991)
              - (4) Lord Hugh Alexander Thomas Joseph Kerr (b. 1999)
          - Lord John Andrew Christopher Kerr (1927-2018)
            - (5) William Walter Raleigh Kerr (b. 1950)
              - (6) Robert John Edward Kerr (b. 1987)
                - (7) Hugh Cornelius William Kerr (b. 2019)
                - (8) Rupert Aubrey Michael Kerr (b. 2022)
              - (9) Walter William Kerr (b. 1992)
                - (10) Alfred Benjamin Fox Kerr (b. 2025)
            - (11) David John Kerr (b. 1952)
              - (12) John Andrew David Kerr (b. 1981)
              - (13) Andrew Christopher Kerr (b. 1984)
            - (14) Andrew Peter Hugh Kerr (b. 1955)
    - Lord Henry Francis Charles Kerr (1800–1882)
      - Francis Ernest Kerr (1840–1884)
        - Henry Francis Kerr (1878–1972)
          - Francis Robert Newsam Kerr (1916-1995)
            - Male issue in remainder
    - Lord Charles Lennox Kerr (1814-1898)
      - Charles Wyndham Rodolph Kerr (1849-1894)
        - Charles Iain Kerr, 1st Baron Teviot (1874-1968)
          - Barons Teviot
    - Lord Frederic Herbert Kerr (1818-1896)
      - Arthur Herbert Kerr (1862-1930)
        - Mark Peregrine Charles Kerr (1891-1951)
          - Frederic Mark Kerr (1919-2000)
            - Male issue in remainder
  - Lord Mark Robert Kerr (1776-1840)
    - Hugh Seymour McDonnell, 4th Earl of Antrim (1812-1855)
    - Mark McDonnell, 5th Earl of Antrim (1814-1869)
      - Earls of Antrim
  - Lord Robert Kerr (1780-1843)
    - William Walter Raleigh Kerr (1809-1881)
      - William Walter Raleigh Kerr (1859-1941)
        - Louis William Howard Kerr (1894-1977)
          - Male issue and descendants in remainder

The above line of succession represents only those who are in remainder to the Marquessate of Lothian. There are further collateral branches that provide heirs to other titles separately granted and are currently held by the current Marquess of Lothian.

== See also ==
- Baron Teviot
- Clan Kerr

== Bibliography ==
- Peerage: L (part 4), at Leigh Rayment's Peerage pages
- Photo and biography of Walter William Schomberg Kerr, Earl of Ancram
- Chisholm, Hugh, ed. (1911). "Lothian, Earls and Marquesses of" . Encyclopædia Britannica. Vol. 17 (11th ed.). Cambridge University Press. p. 18.
