= Barrington Bourchier =

Member of the Parliament of England

Barrington Bourchier (c. 1627 – 29 October 1695) was an English politician who sat in the House of Commons in 1660.

== Biography ==
Bourchier was the son of John Bourchier of Beningborough, Yorkshire. He was admitted to Gray's Inn on 16 March 1641. In 1658 he was High Sheriff of Yorkshire. His father was a regicide and at the Restoration was attainted and had his lands forfeited. However, on his father's death in 1660 Bourchier had the forfeited lands restored to him.

In 1660, Bourchier was elected Member of Parliament for Thirsk in the Convention Parliament.

Bourchier had a son also called Barrington.
