= Anne Cornwallis =

English Roman Catholic benefactor and one time supposed author

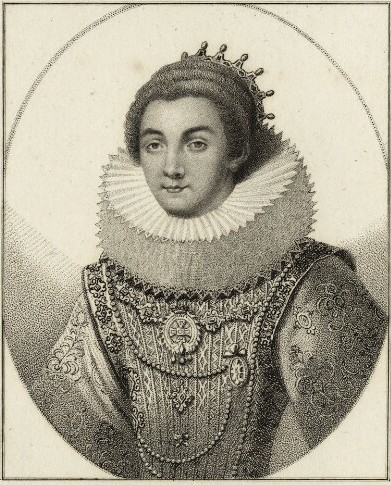
- prob. by Silvester Harding
- Born: 1590
- Died: 12 January 1635 (aged 44–45); Drury Lane
- Known for: once thought to be an author and a noted Roman Catholic

Anne Cornwallis or Anne, countess of Argyll (1590 – 12 January 1635) was an English Roman Catholic benefactor and one time supposed author.

== Life ==
Cornwallis was probably born in Suffolk where her parents Lady Lucy and Sir William Cornwallis lived at Brome. She was the cousin of the essayist William Cornwallis.

Her name appears on an extant anthology of poems that includes poetry by Edward de Vere and William Shakespeare. Opinion once thought that she had created the anthology but it is now thought to be the work of another and her role was minor.

She married Archibald Campbell, the 7th Earl of Argyll, in 1610. She was his second wife and he already had one son (and heir) and six daughters. In January 1610 Argyll argued with the Earl of Pembroke over the precedency of her seating at a dinner hosted by Lady Hatton.

In April 1617, her sister Cornelia, the wife of Sir Richard Fermor, accidentally shot a young lawyer with a pocket pistol. The Earl of Argyll bailed her from the Marshalsea Prison. She stood trial for the killing in July.

They left Britain allegedly to "take the waters" at Spa but in 1618 Archibald Campbell converted from Presbyterianism to Anne's religion of Roman Catholicism. Archibald had surrendered his estates to his son, Archibald Campbell. As a consequence her husband was declared a traitor in Edinburgh on 16 February 1619 and banned from returning to his country. Her converted husband was very supportive of his new religion even after he could have returned without penalty in 1621. He was interested in military solutions in Ireland in 1622, but he was unable to raise an army.

They had three sons and five daughters. All but one of the daughters (Mary) became a nun.

She and her husband returned to Britain and lived at Drury Lane in London having abandoned everything apart from his title to his heir.

The English author William Habington addressed a poem to her in his collection titled Castara.
