= Anne Stanley, Countess of Ancram =

English aristocrat

Anne Stanley
- Countess of Ancram
- Died: 1657
- Buried: Westminster Abbey
- Noble family: Stanley (by birth); Kerr (by marriage)
- Spouses: Sir Henry Portman (m. 1615; died 1621): Robert Kerr, 1st Earl of Ancram
- Issue: Charles Kerr, 2nd Earl of Ancram; Vere Kerr; Elizabeth Kerr; Henrietta Maria Kerr; Stanley Kerr
- Father: William Stanley, 6th Earl of Derby
- Mother: Elizabeth de Vere

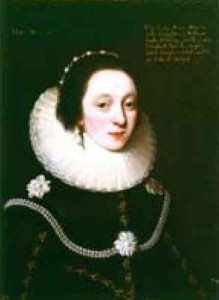

Anne Stanley, Countess of Ancram (died 1657) was an English aristocrat.

Anne Stanley was a daughter of William Stanley, 6th Earl of Derby, and Elizabeth de Vere, Countess of Derby. Through her paternal grandmother, she was a great-great-granddaughter of Mary Tudor, Queen of France and Charles Brandon, 1st Duke of Suffolk, thereby making her a direct descendant of Henry VII. On 20 July 1615, she married Sir Henry Portman (1596–1621) of Orchard Portman, Somerset, a Member of Parliament and Keeper of Roche Forest. The couple had no children. In November 1621, Prince Charles wrote to Anne's mother, proposing Sir Robert Kerr as a second husband for Anne, arguing that his position in court as a Gentleman of the Bedchamber made up for his lack of wealth. Anne married Kerr. He became the Earl of Ancram in 1633.

Kerr lived in exile in Amsterdam during the Civil War. His royal pension was stopped by the Commonwealth. Lady Ancram petitioned Parliament for funds in both September 1653 and again in 1654, seeking support for her six surviving children. She received £5 weekly. According to the Bank of England's inflation calculator, £5 in 1633 would be the equivalent of £1,158.33 in 2020 ($1,600.41 USD). Robert Kerr died in Amsterdam in 1654.

Anne died in February 1657 and was buried in Westminster Abbey. There is no monument.

== Family ==
Her children with Robert Kerr included:

- Vere Kerr (c. 1622-1708), who married Henry Wilkinson. The Folger Shakespeare Library has a manuscript recipe book (V.a.612) connected with the family and according to the title, compiled in part by Anne's eldest daughter.
- Charles Kerr, 2nd Earl of Ancram (1624-1690)
- Elizabeth Kerr, who married Colonel Nathaniel Rich.
- Henrietta Maria Kerr (d. 1647), buried at Westminster Abbey.
- Stanley Kerr

Anne (nee Stanley) Kerr, Countess of Ancram, can easily be confused with her contemporary, Anne Kerr, Countess of Lothian.

The Earl of Derby at Knowsley Hall had a version of her portrait wearing a black dress with red sleeves, ornamented with silver sprigs, dated 1638 and attributed (in the nineteenth century) to Gerrit van Honthorst.
