= Archibald Campbell, 7th Earl of Argyll =

Scottish politician and military leader

Archibald Campbell
- Earl of Argyll
- Tenure: 1584–1638
- Born: c. 1575
- Died: 1638 (aged 62–63); Kilmun Parish Church and Argyll Mausoleum
- Spouses: Lady Agnes Douglas (m. 1592; died 1607) Anne Cornwallis (m. 1610; died 1635)
- Issue: 9 children
- Father: Colin Campbell, 6th Earl of Argyll
- Mother: Agnes Keith, Countess of Moray

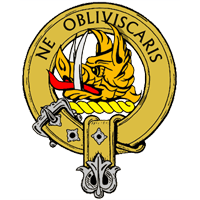

Archibald Campbell, 7th Earl of Argyll (c. 1575–1638), also called "Gillesbuig Grumach" ("Archibald the Grim"), was a Scottish peer, politician, and military leader.

== Life ==
Campbell was the son of Colin Campbell, 6th Earl of Argyll and Agnes Keith.

His nickname, "Gillesbuig Grumach", is the Gaelic for "Archibald the Grim". This may originate from his first wife, Agnes Douglas, whose 14th-century ancestor, Archibald Douglas, 3rd Earl of Douglas was so called.

On 15 July 1594 James VI gave him a commission to wage war with "fire and sword" against the Catholic Earls of Huntly and Erroll. He commanded royal troops at the Battle of Glenlivet on 3 October 1594 and was defeated by the rebel earls and their followers.

After the Union of Crowns, Argyll accompanied Anne of Denmark on her journey south to Windsor Castle in June 1603. On the way he quarrelled with the Earl of Sussex. At Worksop Manor, the Duke of Lennox and the Earls of Shrewsbury and Cumberland made a proclamation at that her followers should put aside any private quarrels.

In January 1610 he argued over the precedency of seating of his wife, Anne Cornwallis, with the Earl of Pembroke, at a dinner hosted by Lady Hatton. King James commanded Argyll to yield place to Pembroke until Parliament decided their issue.

By 1619, he had surrendered his estates to his son, Archibald Campbell. He was made a Knight of the Golden Fleece in 1624. He had announced his conversion to Catholicism from the Netherlands and as a consequence he was declared a traitor in Edinburgh on 16 February 1619 and banned from his country. He was very supportive of his new religion even after he was allowed back in 1621. He was interested in military solutions in Ireland in 1622, but he was unable to raise an army. He and his wife returned to Britain and lived at Drury Lane in London having abandoned everything apart from his title to his heir. In 1636, the Earl was indicted for recusancy.

He died in 1638 and was buried at Kilmun Parish Church.

== Family ==
On 24 July 1592, he married his first wife, Lady Agnes Douglas, youngest daughter of the Earl of Morton at Dalkeith Palace. Some "very great personages" had tried to persuade Argyll to marry Marie Stewart sister of the king's favourite, the Duke of Lennox. On the day after their wedding Argyll rode at speed to Falkland Palace to help James VI who was threatened by the Earl of Bothwell.

Argyll and Agnes Douglas had at least five children, including:

- Annabel Campbell (d. 1652), who married Robert Kerr, 2nd Earl of Lothian
- Anne Campbell (d. 1638), who married George Gordon, 2nd Marquess of Huntly
- Archibald Campbell, 1st Marquess of Argyll (1607-1661), who married Margaret Douglas (1610–1678)
- Jane Campbell (? - 1675) became Viscountess Kenmure

After the death of his first wife on 3 May 1607, Argyll considered marrying Jean Drummond, a lady in waiting to Anne of Denmark. Instead, in 1608 he married Anne (Cornwallis), with whom he had at least four more children. Her sister Cornelia, the wife of Sir Richard Fermor, accidentally shot a young lawyer with a pocket pistol in April 1617. The Earl of Argyll bailed her from the Marshalsea Prison.

In 1618 Archibald Campbell converted to Roman Catholicism, the religion of his new wife, from Presbyterianism. She was at Spa in Belgium in August 1618 and travelled on to Brussels in her coach.

Legal offices
Preceded by The Earl of Argyll	Lord Justice General; 1584–1628	Succeeded by The Earl of Airth
Peerage of Scotland
Preceded by Colin Campbell	Earl of Argyll; 1584–1638	Succeeded by Archibald Campbell
