= Robert Kerr, 1st Earl of Ancram =

Scottish nobleman and politician (c. 1578–1654)

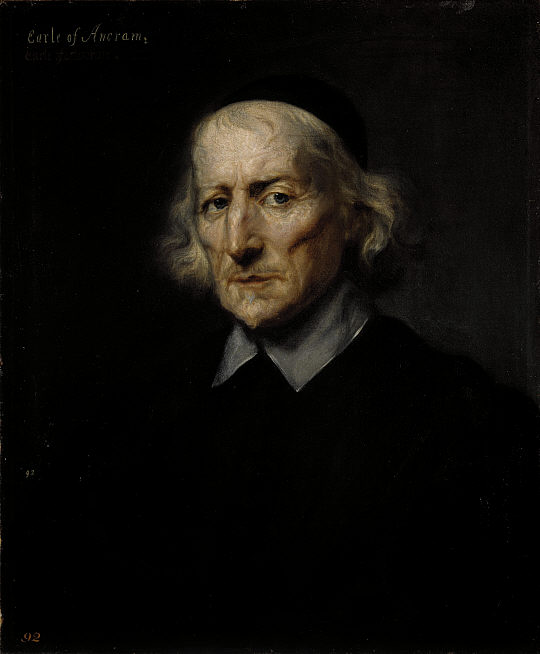
Robert Kerr, 1st Earl of Ancram by Jan Lievens

Robert Kerr, 1st Earl of Ancram (c. 1578–1654) was a Scottish nobleman, politician and writer.

== Biography ==
He descended from a third son of Sir Andrew Kerr of Ferniehurst, and was laird of Ancrum in Roxburghshire. His father was William Kerr of Ancrum and his mother was Margaret Dundas, a daughter of Alexander Dundas of Fingask.

He was born about 1578, and succeeded to the family estate in 1590 on the death of his father, who was assassinated on the orders of his kinsman, Robert Ker, younger of Cessford. Cessford's men ambushed William Kerr of Ancram on the stairs at the entry to his lodging and shot him with a pistol called a "dag". The dispute concerned the office of Provost of Jedburgh. His widowed mother married George Douglas of Mordington, a son of George Douglas of Parkhead, and had several more children.

Robert Kerr was honoured at an early age with court favour. Soon after the king's accession to the English throne, Kerr occupied a considerable station in the household of Prince Henry and Princess Elizabeth at Oatlands. He was knighted, probably in 1605. In March 1608, James gave him diamond-set gold locket with his picture, supplied for £300 by the goldsmith Henrick van Hulton.

After the death of Prince Henry in 1612, Kerr joined the household of Prince Charles as a gentleman of the bedchamber, gaining the position with the help of his cousin, the favourite Robert Carr, then Lord Rochester. In April 1613 he was made a denizen of England. Charles became his patron through life. Charles mediated his second marriage to Lady Anne Stanley, daughter of the Earl of Derby.

In 1620, Kerr was involved in a fatal quarrel with Charles Maxwell, who insinuated that he had slighted the Duke of Buckingham and insulted him without provocation as he entered the palace at Newmarket. In a duel that followed, Sir Robert killed Maxwell. Even though Maxwell's friends acquitted Kerr of blame, the king's strict rules for prevention and punishment of duels forced him to flee to Holland, where he remained about a year. During his exile, he collected pictures, for which, like his royal master, he had good taste. He eventually presented those he brought back with him to the prince. He was also distinguished by his literary taste and was a friend of John Donne. He also lived in Whitehall Palace and Kew.

On the accession of Charles I to the throne, in 1625, Sir Robert Kerr was made a gentleman of the bedchamber.

He was Member of Parliament (MP) for Aylesbury in 1625, and for Lostwithiel and Preston in 1628.

Kerr came to Scotland in June 1629. He brought a gift from Charles I to Lady Yester, a jewelled hair-dressing described as a "head busk", a band of small diamonds set in fleur de lys to wear at the forehead from ear to ear. He mentioned Charles' gratitude to her mother Grizel, Lady Seton, for looking after him as a child at Dunfermline Palace.

On 24 June 1633, when Charles was in Scotland at his coronation, Kerr was elevated to the peerage under the titles Earl of Ancram and Lord Kerr of Nisbet, Langnewton, and Dolphinstoun. Previously, his son William, by his first wife Elizabeth, daughter of Sir John Murray of Blackbarony, had married his relative, Anne, Countess of Lothian in her own right, and had been, by the king, given the title Earl of Lothian. It was therefore arranged, in the patent granted to Kerr, that his own title should descend to the children of his second marriage. Thus, he was father of two peers.

Unlike others who owed everything to this prince, the Earl of Ancram remained the prince's steady adherent during the whole of his troubles—though he was unable to prevent his eldest son, the Earl of Lothian, from acting a conspicuous part on the opposite side. On the death of King Charles, Kerr took refuge in Holland, where he spent the remainder of his days in solitary afflictions and poverty, and died in 1654, aged 76. Jan Lievens painted him marvelously.

His son Charles, inherited his title, but ultimately merged with that of Lothian.

== Family ==
He had two sons by his first marriage to Elizabeth Murray:

- Stanley Kerr (d. bef. May 1672)
- William Kerr, 1st Earl of Lothian (bef. 1615 – c. October 1675)

He had one son and two daughters by his second marriage to Anne, daughter of William Stanley, 6th Earl of Derby:

- Charles Kerr, 2nd Earl of Ancram (6 August 1624 – September 1690)
- Vere Kerr
- Elizabeth Kerr

Peerage of Scotland
New creation	Earl of Ancram; 1633–1654	Succeeded by Charles Kerr
