= William Kerr, 1st Earl of Lothian =

Scottish nobleman (1605–1675)

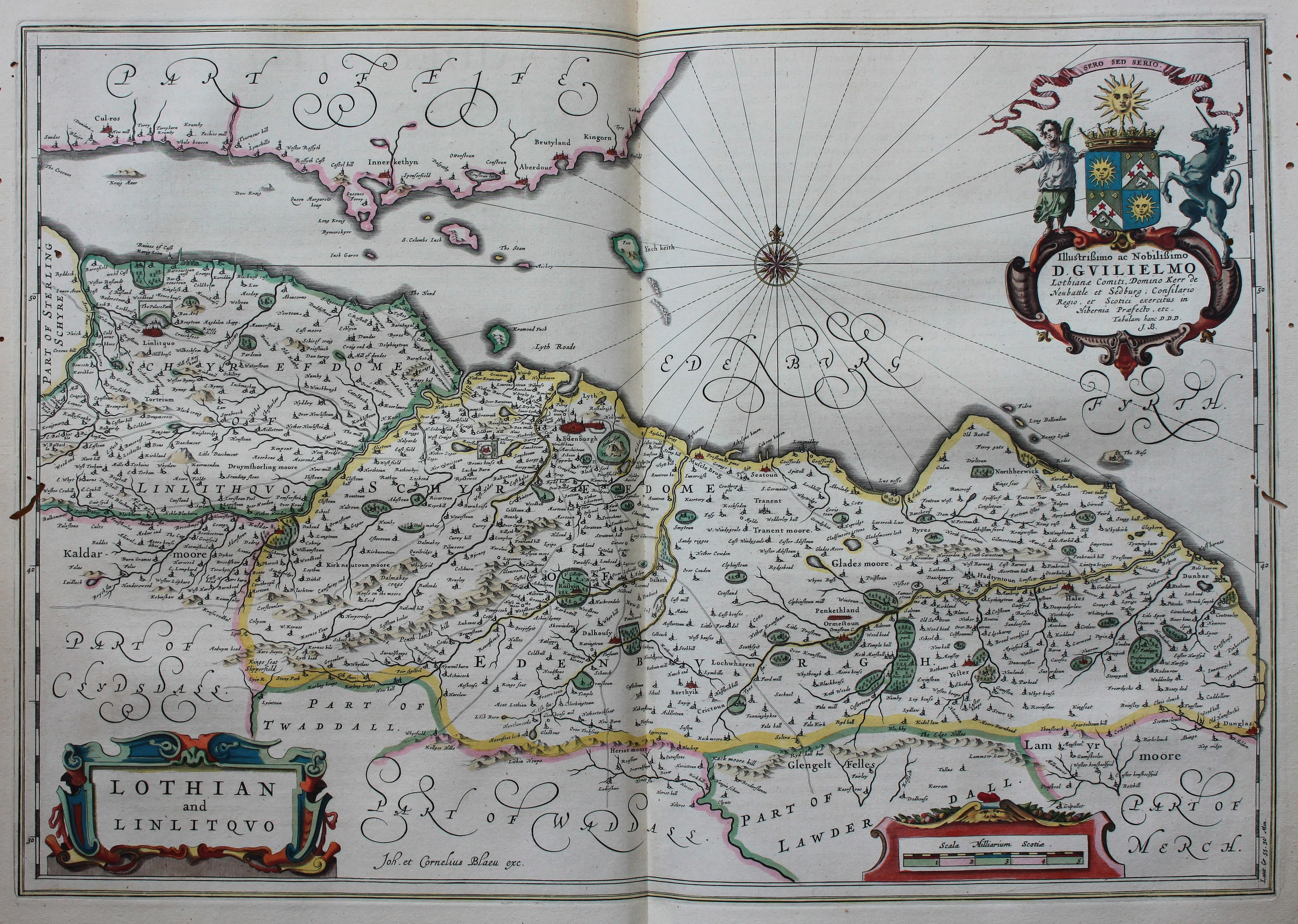
Old map of Lothian and Linlithgow, with the arms of William Kerr, 1st Earl of Lothian

William Kerr, first Earl of Lothian of a new creation (1605–1675) was a Scottish nobleman.

== Career ==
Kerr signed the national covenant in 1638 and marched with the Scots into England in 1640, being present when the English were routed at the Battle of Newburn. Afterwards, he became Governor of Newcastle. He was appointed one of the four commissioners of the treasury in 1642, was lieutenant-general of the Scots Army in Ireland, and was appointed privy councillor in the same year.

He entered Parliament in 1644 and joined Lord Argyll in an expedition against Lord Montrose during the Wars of the Three Kingdoms in 1644. He was one of the commissioners sent to treat with the king at Holmby House in 1647.

He was appointed secretary of state in 1649 and was one of the commissioners sent by the Scottish Parliament to protest against proceeding to extremes against the king, visiting Charles II in exile at Breda. He was a general of the Scottish forces in 1650. In 1662 he refused to take the abjuration oath.

== Personal life ==
The eldest son of Sir Robert Kerr, later 1st Earl of Ancram, he was born within St James's Palace in London and was educated at Cambridge University and at Paris. Kerr was knighted at Newmarket on 6 March 1627. He accompanied George Villiers, 1st Duke of Buckingham to the Isle of Rhé in 1627 and served in the expedition against Spain in 1631.

He married Anne Kerr, Countess of Lothian in 1630 and was created Lord Kerr of Newbattle and Earl of Lothian in his own right in 1631. Children of William Kerr, 1st Earl of Lothian and Lady Anne Kerr:

- Lady Mary Kerr (died Mar 1708), who married James Brodie, 16th Chieftain of Clan Brodie
- Lady Margaret Kerr
- Lady Anne Kerr (26 November 1631 – 30 August 1658)
- Lady Elizabeth Kerr (born 6 September 1633), who married Sir Francis Scott of Thirlestane, and was mother of Sir William Scott of Thirlestane.
- Robert Kerr, 1st Marquess of Lothian (8 March 1636 – 15 February 1703)
- Sir William Kerr (born 22 December 1638)
- Charles Kerr (born 17 July 1642)
- Lady Vere Kerr (24 April 1649 – 17 April 1674)
- Lady Henrietta Kerr (2 February 1653 – 30 June 1741)

Peerage of Scotland
New creation	Earl of Lothian; 1631–1675	Succeeded by Robert Kerr
