= Rakuto Maru =

Japanese cargo steamship

History

Japan
- Name: Rakuto Maru
- Owner: 1935: Osaka Shōsen KK; 1939: Toa Kaiun KK
- Operator: 1937: (Empire of Japan) Imperial Japanese Army; 1941: (Japan) Imperial Japanese Navy
- Port of registry: 1935: (Japan) Osaka; 1943: (Japan) Tokyo
- Builder: Uraga Dock Co, Uraga
- Laid down: 13 April 1935
- Launched: 20 July 1935
- Completed: 15 September 1935
- Refit: November – December 1941
- Homeport: 1941: Sasebo; 1942: Kure
- Identification: call sign JZMH
- Fate: sunk by aerial bombing, 1944

General characteristics
- Type: cargo ship
- Tonnage: 2,962 GRT, 1,723 NRT
- Length: 297.9 ft (90.8 m)
- Beam: 45.0 ft (13.7 m)
- Depth: 23.8 ft (7.3 m)
- Decks: 2
- Installed power: 1 × compound engine + single reduction gearing; 1 × exhaust steam turbine + double reduction gearing; total 109 NHP, or 2,000 ihp
- Propulsion: 1 × screw
- Speed: 13.9 knots (26 km/h)
- Notes: sister ships: Daido Maru; Ryuko Maru

Rakuto Maru was a cargo steamship that was built in Japan in 1935. The Imperial Japanese Army requisitioned her in 1937, and used her in the Second Sino-Japanese War. The Imperial Japanese Navy requisitioned her in 1941. In 1942 she took part in the invasion of Tarakan. In 1943 she survived hitting a mine, and she aided the cruiser Aoba after a USAAF air raid crippled her. She was sunk in the Philippines in 1944 by US Navy aircraft that attacked the convoy in which she was sailing. 199 of the people aboard her were killed.

Rakuto Maru was the first of a series of ships that the Uraga Dock Company of Uraga, Kanagawa equipped with a new propulsion system, which used reduction gearing not only for an exhaust steam turbine, but also for a high-speed reciprocating steam engine. Uraga went on to build numerous other ships with the same propulsion system, including at least ten of the same class as Rakuto Maru.

== Building ==
In 1935 the Uraga Dock Company launched three sister ships for Osaka Shōsen KK. Rakuto Maru was the first. Her keel plates were laid on 13 April 1935; she was launched on 20 July; and completed on 15 September. She was followed by Daido Maru, which was launched on 19 August; and Ryuko Maru, which was launched on 21 November. The three ships were built to the same design as Sinkyo Maru and Seikyo Maru, which Uraga had built for Chōsen Yusen KK between 1932 and 1934; but with a different propulsion system.

Rakuto Maru's length was 297.9 ft (90.8 m); her beam was 45.0 ft (13.7 m); and her depth was 23.8 ft (7.3 m). Her tonnages were 2,962 GRT and 1,723 NRT. She had a raked bow, cruiser stern, and well decks fore and aft. She had two masts, and her engine room; boiler room; superstructure; and single funnel were amidships.

== Main engines ==
Rakuto Maru had one screw; driven by two engines. A four-cylinder compound engine drove her propeller shaft via single reduction gearing. Exhaust steam from the low-pressure cylinders of the reciprocating engine drove an exhaust steam turbine, which drove the same propeller shaft, but via double reduction gearing. The combined power of her two engines was rated at 109 NHP, or 2,000 ihp. It gave her a top speed of 13.9 knots (26 km/h); and a cruising speed of 11.5 knots (21 km/h).

Reduction gearing allowed the engine to run several times faster than the propeller. This meant that the reciprocating engine could be much smaller and lighter than one that ran at the same speed as the propeller. Rakuto Maru achieved almost the same performance with engines rated at 109 NHP as Sinkyo Maru did with a low-speed triple-expansion engine plus exhaust turbine, which together were rated at 171 NHP.

A British engineer, William Albert White, had invented a combination of a high-speed compound engine with single reduction gearing, and an exhaust steam turbine with double reduction gearing. In 1934 he had installed it in the cargo ship Adderstone, and in 1935 he installed a smaller version in the fishing trawler White Pioneer. At the same time as White Pioneer was being built, Uraga applied similar principles to Rakuto Maru and her two sisters.

From 1937 onward, Uraga built several more cargo ships to the same design as Rakuto Maru, and with the same combination of compound engine; exhaust turbine; and reduction gearing. In 1937, Yamabato Maru was completed for Yamashita Kisen KK, and Anshu Maru and Teishu Maru were completed for Chōsen Yusen KK. In 1938, Nikkai Maru was completed for Nissan Kisen KK; and Keiko Maru and Kanko Maru were completed for Osaka Shōsen KK. In 1939, Sinko Maru and Zuiko Maru were completed for Toa Kaiun KK.

== Civilian and Army career ==
Rakuto Maru was registered in Osaka. Her wireless telegraph call sign was JZMH. After her completion in September 1935, she made short-sea voyages twice a month for the rest of the year. One of these was to Rashin and Yuki in Chōsen, which are now Rason and Sonbong-guyok in North Korea.

Early in 1937, the Japanese Army requisitioned Rakuto Maru. The Second Sino-Japanese War began that July, and Rakuto Maru remained in Army service until early 1939, when she was returned to her owners.

On 12 August 1939, Toa Kaiun KK acquired Rakuto Maru. Her registration was transferred to Tokyo, although this was not recorded in Lloyd's Register until 1943.

== Naval career ==
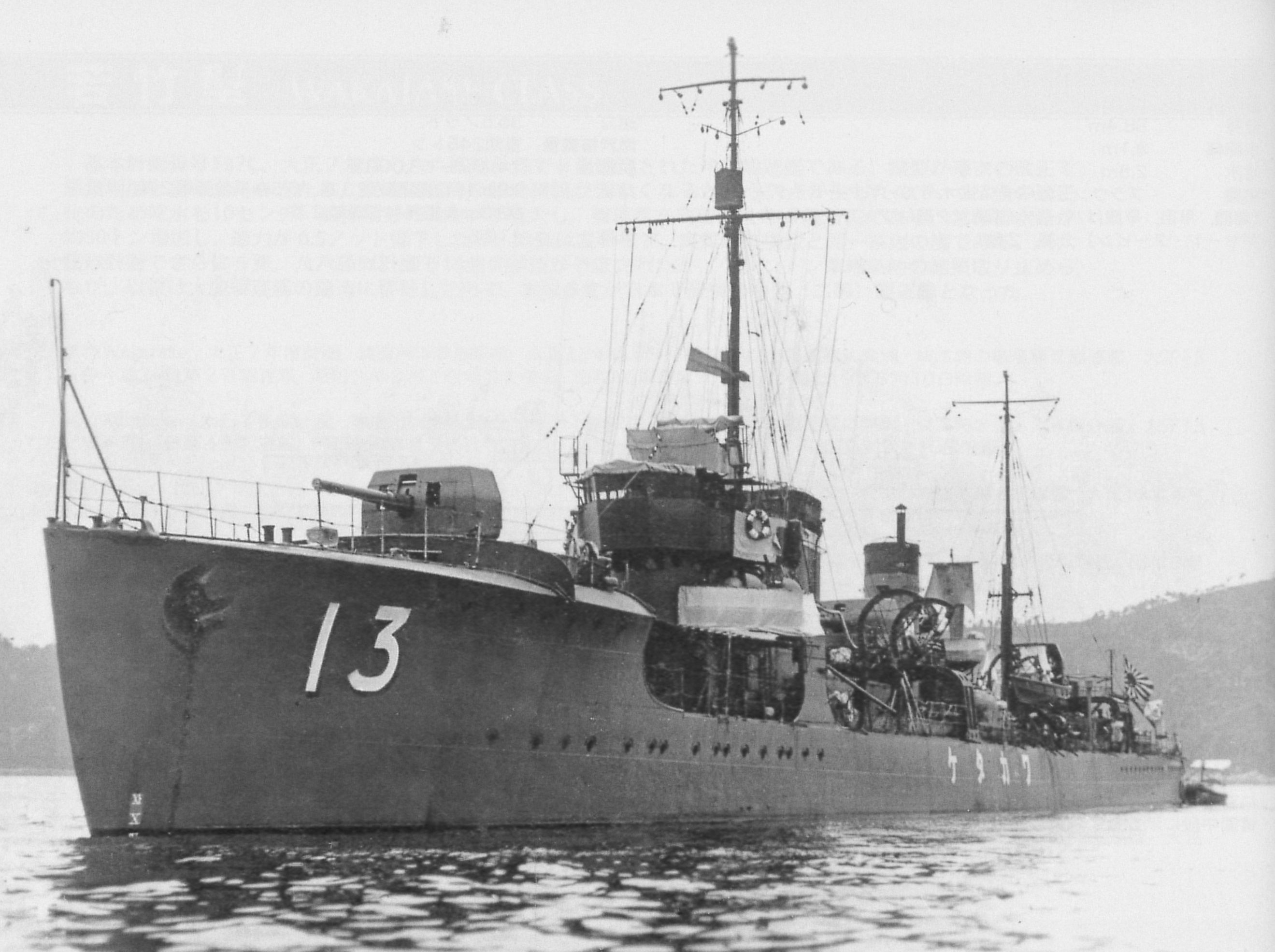
The destroyer Wakatake

On 10 November 1941, the Imperial Japanese Navy requisitioned Rakuto Maru. On 19 November she arrived at Osaka Iron Works at Innoshima, Hiroshima, to be converted into an auxiliary transport. An order issued the next day attached her to the Sasebo Naval District. On 1 December her conversion was completed, and she left Innoshima.

Rakuto Maru sailed via Osaka to Kure Naval Arsenal, where she was in port from 6 to 20 December. She left Kure in convoy with another auxiliary transport, Kunitsu Maru, escorted by the destroyer Wakatake. On 28 December the three ships reached Palau in the Caroline Islands. On 1 January 1942, Rakuto Maru left Palau in convoy with two other auxiliary transports and an auxiliary oiler. On 4 January she reached Davao in the Philippines. Later she moved to Daliao, about 8 nautical miles (15 km) southwest of Davao, where she joined the fleet assembling to invade the island of Tarakan in the Dutch East Indies. On 6 January 1942, the invasion fleet left Daliao, with Rakuto Maru in the Second Echelon. On 11 January the fleet landed troops on Tarakan, and the next day The Dutch garrison surrendered.

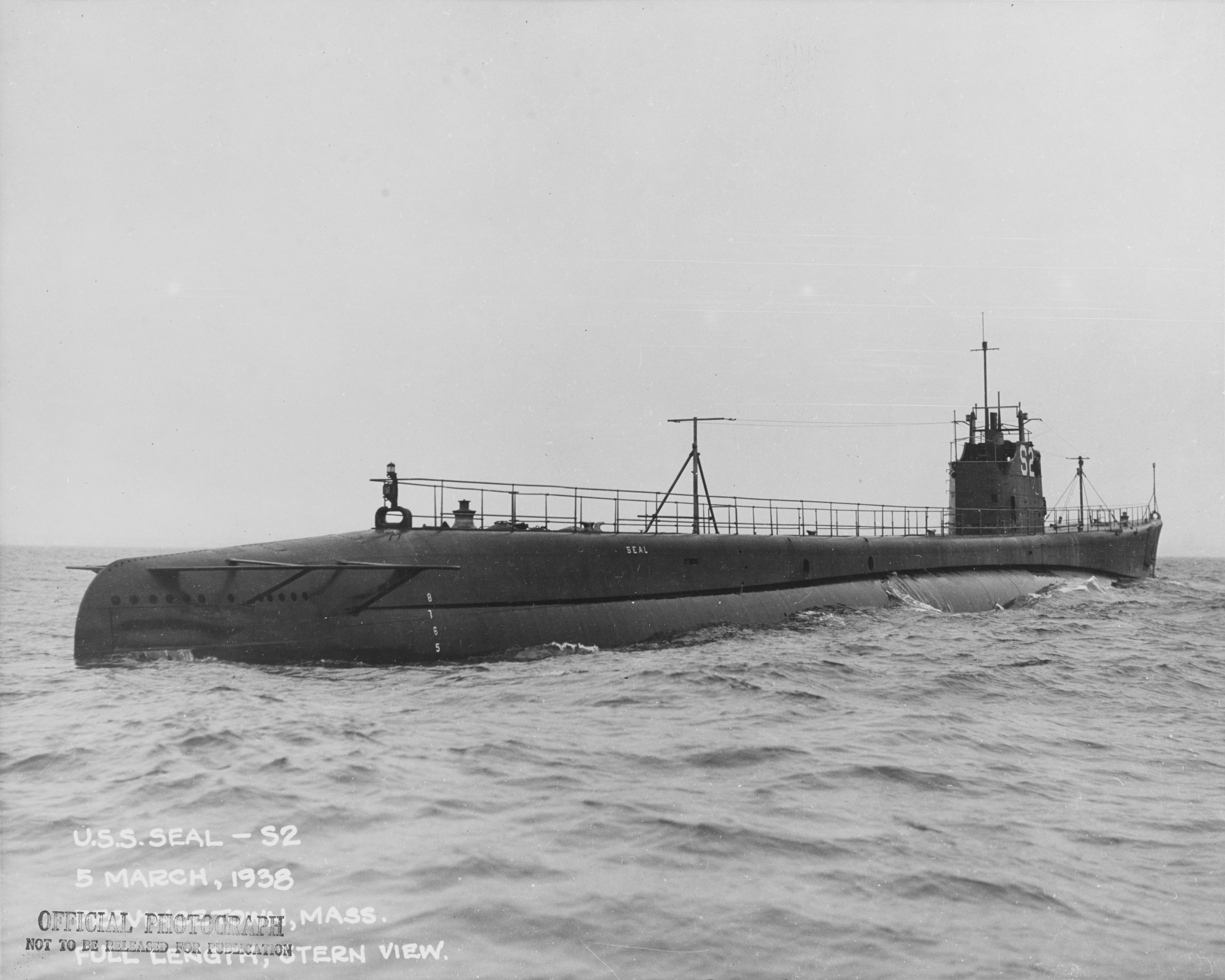
The submarine USS Seal

On 27 January 1942, Rakuto Maru left Tarakan on 27 January. She called at Balikpapan in Borneo; Jolo, Sulu; and Makassar, Sulawesi. On 23 February she left Kakassar in convoy with four other transports, and an escort of destroyers. The next day, the United States Navy submarine USS Seal attacked the convoy. One of her torpedoes hit the transport Okitsu Maru, but failed to detonate. The convoy continued on course, and on 25 February reached Bali. In the first week of March, Rakuto Maru supplied Imperial Japanese Navy Air Service units in southern Bali.

From Bali, Rakuto Maru sailed to Kupang in West Timor, where on 27 March she was slightly damaged in an Allied air raid. After Kupang called at Ambon, Maluku and Takao (now Kaohsiung) in Taiwan. On 10 April, while she was at sea between Ambon and Takao, Rakuto Maru was transferred from the Navy Air Service to the Kure Naval District. After Takao, Rakuto Maru called at Osaka; Seito (now Qingdao) in China); Fushiki in Toyama Prefecture; and Moji. On 23 May she reached Kure Naval Arsenal for her battle-damage to be repaired.

On 14 June her repairs were completed, and Rakuto Maru left Kure. She called at Kirun (now Keelung) in Taiwan; Manila; Davao; Zamboanga; Isabela, Basilan; Mako (now Magong), in the Penghu archipelago; Osaka; and Moji; and on 31 July arrived back at Kure, where she spent a fortnight in port.

On 14 August Rakuto Maru left Kure again. She called at Tokuyama, Yamaguchi; Kure; Shimonoseki; Kirun; Mako; Manila; Davao; Takao; Mutsure; Kure; and Osaka; and on 27 October arrived back in Kure, where she spent a fortnight in port.

On 11 November Rakuto Maru left Kure again. She called at Sasebo; Shimonoseki; Kirun; and Mako. From 1 to 4 December she was in Manila, where she unloaded 1,795 cubic metres (63,400 cu ft) of ammunition. From 7 to 11 December she was in Zamboanga, where she unloaded 3,300 tons of salt. She then called at Manila; Takao; and Mako. From 30 December 1942 to 2 January 1943 she was in Moji, where she unloaded 3,150 tons of salt, and two tracked vehicles. On 4 January she arrived back in Kure, where she unloaded 186 tons of shells, and loaded 1,676 tons of steel plate.

=== 1943 ===
On 14 January 1943, Rakuto Maru left Kure again. She called at Moji; where she unloaded 350 cubic metres (12,000 cu ft) of beer, and bunkered. From 22 to 25 January she was in Hong Kong, where she unloaded 2,026 tons of steel plate. From 27 January to 1 February she was in Haiphong in Indochina, where she loaded cargo including 2,117 tons of zinc ore. From 4 to 7 February she was in Hong Kong, where she loaded cargo including 1,350 cubic metres (48,000 cu ft) of cotton, and embarked 30 passengers. From 15 to 21 February she was in Osaka, where she discharged her cargo and disembarked her passengers. She called at Kure, and from 25 to 28 February was in Moji, where she loaded cargo including 3,620 tons of cement. She called at Kirun; and from 9 to 15 March was in Takao, where she loaded 3,020 cubic metres (107,000 cu ft) of supplies and 92 tons of other cargo. From 22 to 24 March she was in Palau, where she discharged 85 tons of rice, and loaded one landing craft and 19 cubic metres (670 cu ft) of building materials.

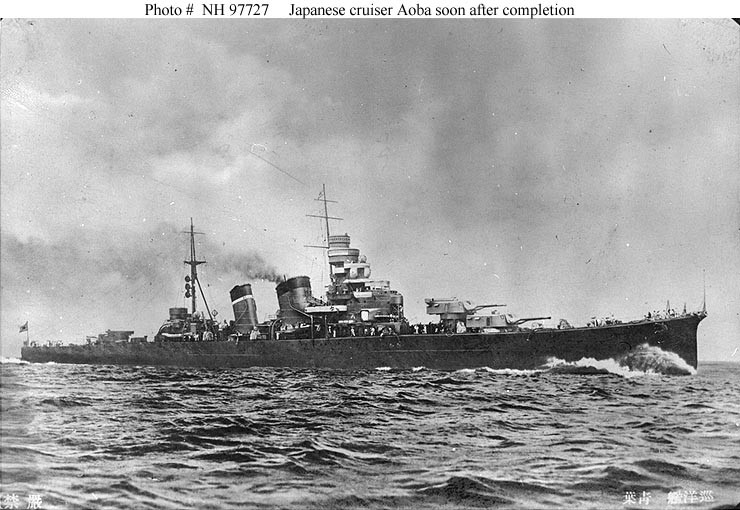
The cruiser Aoba

On 2 April, Rakuto Maru reached Rabaul in New Britain. The next day, the US 43rd Bombardment Group attacked Japanese naval ships at anchor off Kavieng, New Ireland. The cruiser Aoba was badly damaged, and beached to prevent her from sinking. Rakuto Maru came alongside Aoba, transferred 55 tons of medical supplies to the cruiser, and embarked 62 passengers. From 14 to 26 April, Rakuto Maru was in Kavieng, where she unloaded 1,284 tons of supplies, and loaded 308 tons of ammunition.

Rakuto Maru left Kavieng in a convoy with five other transports and the auxiliary oiler San Clemente Maru, escorted by the submarine chaser CH-37. On 4 May, USS Seal attacked the convoy. Three torpedoes hit San Clemente Maru, which sank, with the loss of two members of her crew. One of the transports, Hoko Maru, rescued survivors.

From 5 to 10 May, Rakuto Maru was in Palau, where she bunkered, and replenished her boiler water. From 10 to 13 May she was in Garasumao (now Ngardmau), where she loaded 2,000 tons of bauxite. From 13 to 15 May she was in Palau, where she loaded 23 tons of ammunition, and embarked 23 passengers. She sailed from Palau to Niihama on Shikoku in convoy with four other transports, escorted by the minesweeper W-17. From 26 to 29 May she was in Niihama, where she discharged her cargo of bauxite, and 73 passengers. From 30 May to 4 June she was in Kure, where she unloaded 328 tons of cars. She called at Komatsushima, Tokushima, and on 13 June arrived at Kure, where she unloaded scrap iron, and underwent general repairs.

After repairs, Rakuto Maru loaded bombs, postal parcels, and general cargo, and on 19 July she left Kure. She bunkered and watered at Wakamatsu, and called at Shimonoseki, where she joined four merchant ships in a convoy to Takao, where she bunkered; watered; loaded cargo; and embarked 22 troops. She sailed from Takao to Manila in convoy with three other naval transports and two merchant ships. From 5 to 8 August she was in Manila, where she unloaded 100 cubic metres (3,500 cu ft) of aircraft weapons. She called at Cebu; and from 16 to 28 August was in Balikpapan, where she unloaded 500 tons of iron pipes and 190 cubic metres (6,700 cu ft) of rations, and loaded postal parcels. On 18 August there was an Allied air raid, but Rakuto Maru was undamaged. She called at Makassar, and from 8 to 14 September was in Ambon, where she unloaded 630 cubic metres (22,000 cu ft) of bombs, aircraft parts, and aircraft weapons; 250 cubic metres (8,800 cu ft) of provisions; and two Daihatsu landing craft. She survived Allied air raids on 8 and 11 September without damage, and on 11 September she embarked 34 passengers.

From 17 to 18 September, Rakuto Maru was in Kendari, Sulawesi, where she unloaded 300 cubic metres (11,000 cu ft) of bombs, aircraft parts, and aircraft weapons; and 50 cubic metres (1,800 cu ft) of other weapons. She called at Makassar; and from 1 to 11 October was in Surabaya in Java, where she disembarked her passengers and discharged all of her cargo. She then loaded 878 cubic metres (31,000 cu ft) of weapons and other cargo, and embarked 235 troops. From 14 to 18 October she was in Makassar, where she unloaded hemp fibre and trucks, and loaded 2,000 tons of nickel ore. On 19 October she reached Pomalaa in Southeast Sulawesi, where she disemblarked 242 troops and discharged her nickel ore, and diesel engines for trucks. She also helped to refloat the stranded army transport Nagara Maru.

On 21 October 1943, while at anchor in the outer harbour of Pomalaa, Rakuto Maru struck a mine. It exploded on her starboard side amidships, flooding her engine room and causing extensive damage. She remained afloat; received emergency repairs; and the salvage tug Akitsu Maru towed her to the harbour pier. She survived Allied air attacks on 22 and 26 October, and 1 November, without further damage. From 3 to 12 November, Akitsu Maru towed Rakuto Maru to Surabaya, stopping from 5 to 8 November at Makassar. Rakuto Maru was under repair in Surabaya for eight weeks.

=== 1944 ===
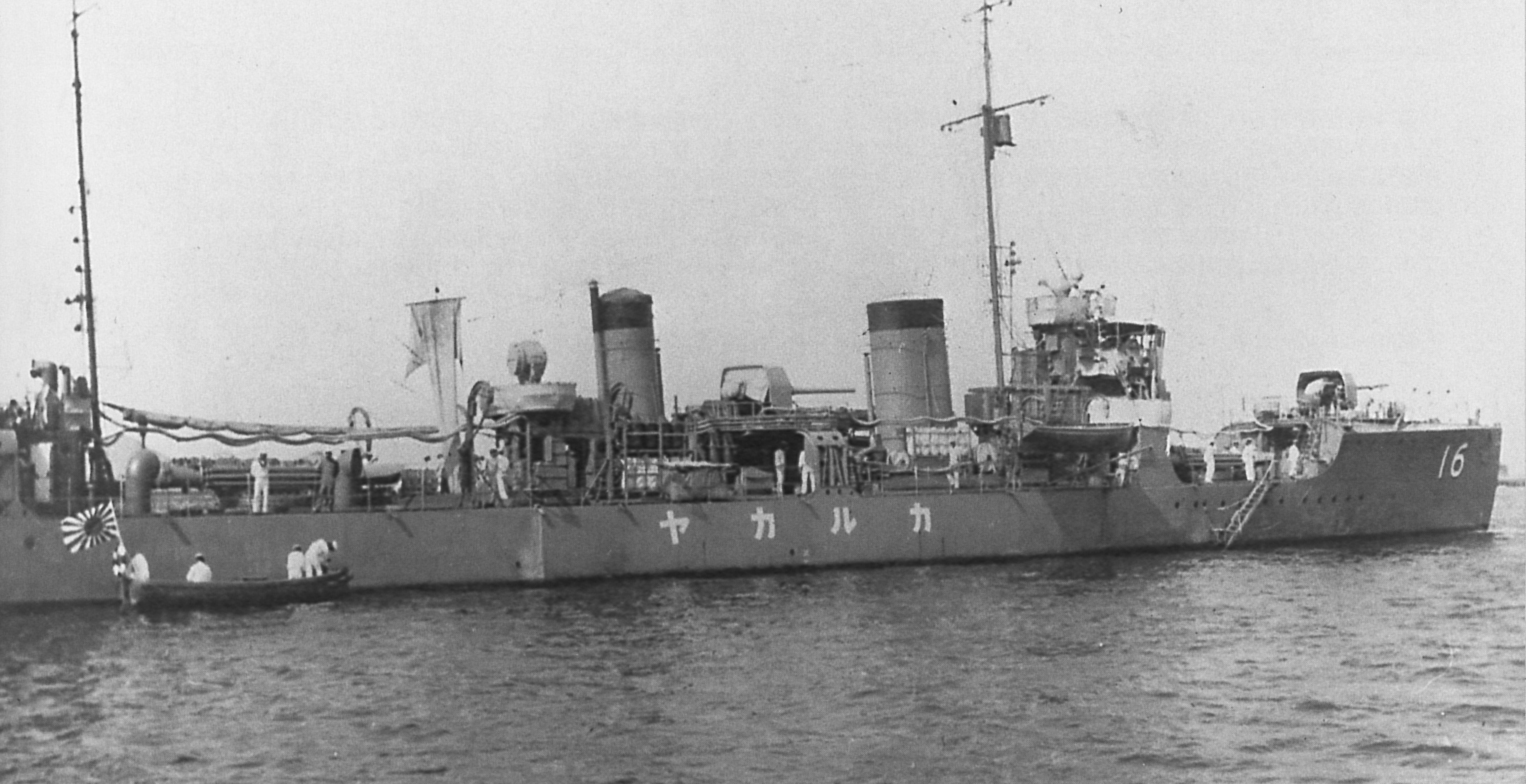
The destroyer Karukaya

On 9 January 1944, Rakuto Maru left Surabaya. She was in Singapore from 13 to 28 January. She called at Seletar. At Keppel Harbour she unloaded ammunition; received weapons maintenance; bunkered; and watered. From 18 to 19 January she loaded bauxite at Bintan Island. From 23 to 29 January she sailed to Saint-Jacques (now Vũng Tàu) and Saigon (now Ho Chi Minh City).

At Saint-Jacques she joined Convoy Sata-01, which included two other transport ships and three merchant ships, and was escorted by the destroyer Karukaya. The convoy left Saint-Jacques on 1 February, and called at Yulin, where the auxiliary gunboat Huashan Maru relieved Karukaya as its escort. On 10 February, the submarine USS Spearfish attacked the convoy, damaging the naval auxiliary transport Tatsuawa Maru with one torpedo. Huashan Maru made submarine sweeps, but Spearfish escaped. On 12 February, the convoy reached Takao. On 16 February, Rakuto Maru left Takao in Convoy Tamo-04, with four merchant ships. Its escorts were Huashan Maru, and the auxiliary minesweeper Takunan Maru No. 3. The convoy reached Moji on 25 February. Rakuto Maru reached Kure later that day; unloaded ammunition on 26 February; and left Kure on 27 February. She called at Niihama; Osaka; Tokuyama; Yoshiura; and Osaka; and then returned to Kure. From 11 to 27 March she was in Kure for repairs.

On 28 March, Rakuto Maru left Kure again. she called at Wakamatsu; Yoshiura; Hirohata in Himeji; Osaka; Moji; Kobe; Wakayama; Aga-Machi; Komatsushima; Etajima; Yawata; Tokuyama; and Chinnampo in Chōsen (now Nampo in North Korea). On 28 June 1944 she arrived at Osaka Iron Works in Innoshima for engine repairs. These were completed on 19 July, and she left Innoshima the next day. In July and early August she called at Kure and Shimonoseki.

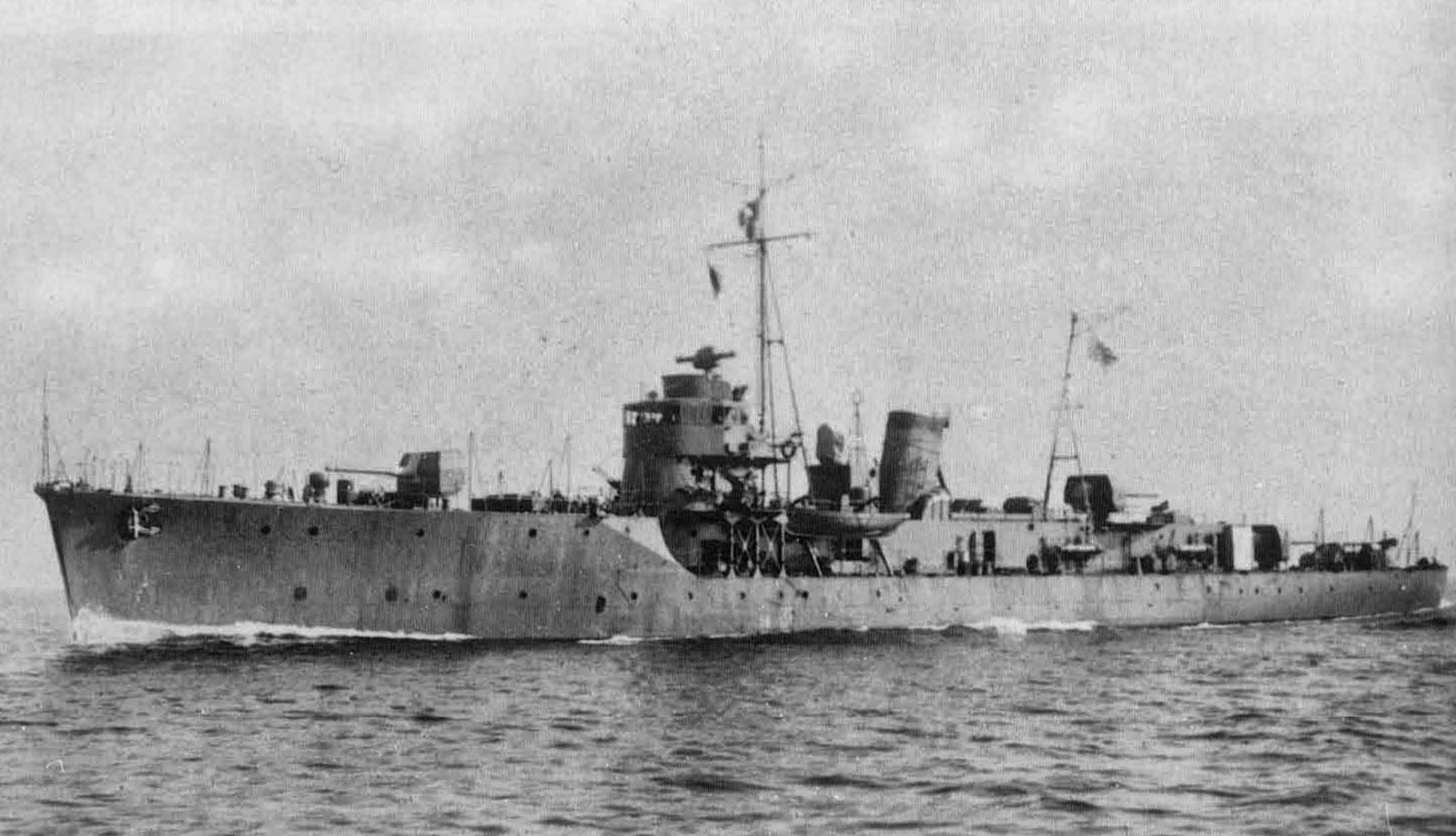
The Kaibōkan Etorofu, one of Mota-22's escorts

On 4 August 1944, Rakuto Maru left Moji in Convoy Mota-22. This included at least a dozen military transports; two tankers; a civilian ore carrier; and five other ships. The gunboat Uji; minelayer Takashima; and eight Kaibōkan escorted the convoy. On 6 August, the submarine USS Pintado attacked the convoy. She sank by torpedo the ore carrier Shonan Maru, killing five of her crew. On 9 August, Koshin Maru's cargo exploded, sinking her. The next day the convoy reached Kirun, and on 11 August it reached Saei (now Zuoying) near Takao. Rakuto Maru later moved from Saei to Takao.

On 22 August, Rakuto Maru left Takao in Convoy Tama-24. This included nine other ships, and was escorted by four Kaibōkan; the minesweepers W-38 and W-39; and the torpedo boat Hato. On 25 August, the submarine USS Picuda stank the tanker Kotoku Maru by torpedo. Three hours later another submarine, USS Redfish, sank the ore carrier Batopahat Maru. She was carrying 480 troops, an unknown number of whom were killed, along with 17 members of her crew. On 28 August, the surviving ships of the convoy reached Manila.

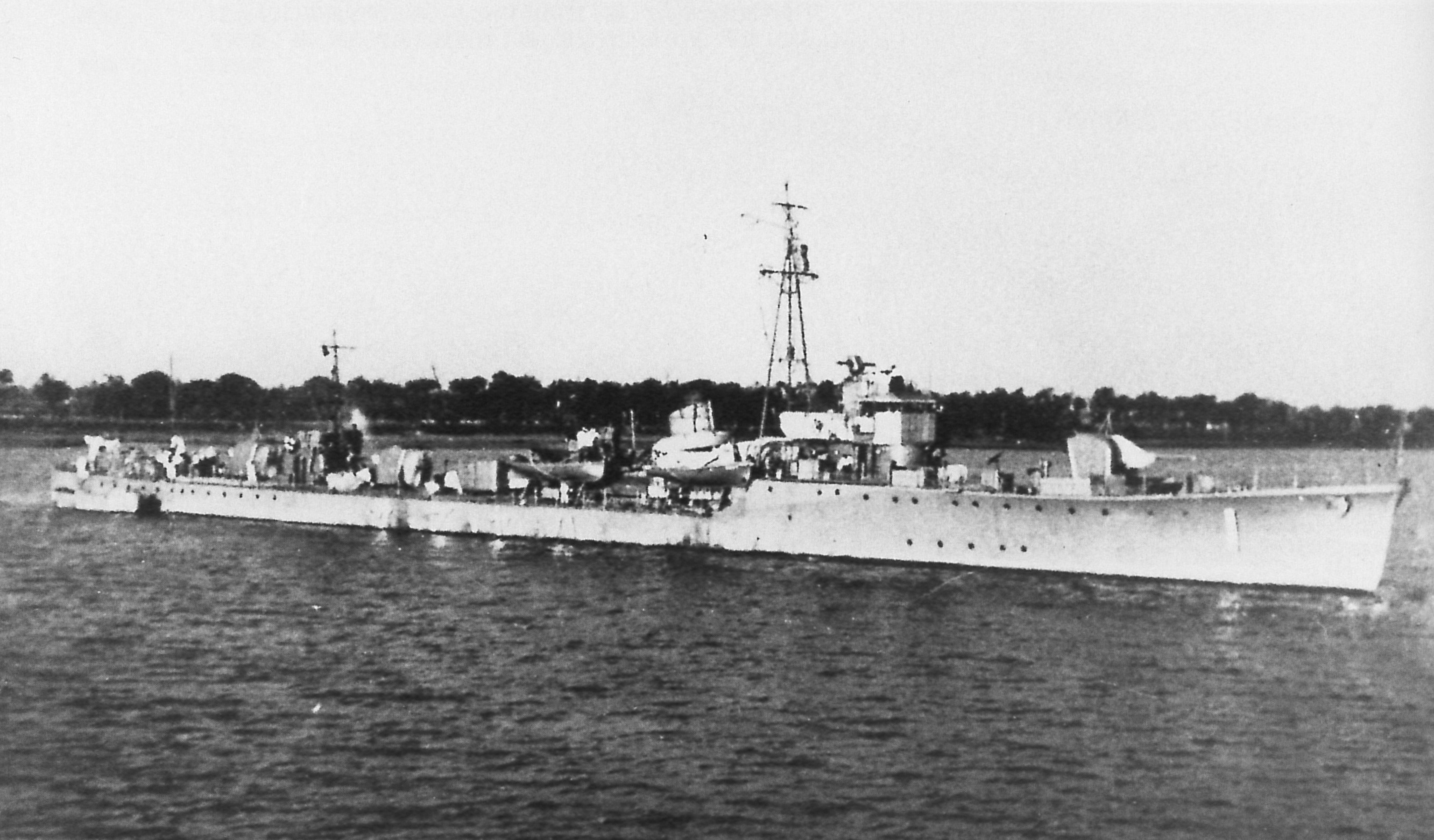
The torpedo boat Hayabusa

On 29 August, Rakuto Maru loaded 2,000 tons of ammunition and 6,000 tons of other cargo, and embarked troops of the 99th Air Defence Unit. On 6 September, she left Manila as a member of Convoy C-067. This included seven other ships, escorted by the torpedo boat Hayabusa, patrol boat No. 103, and two auxiliary submarine chasers. The convoy called at Cebu on 8–9 September, and Calaguan in the Philippines on 10–11 September. On 12 September, US Navy aircraft of Task Force 38 attacked C-067 off Mactan, sinking five ships: Ayazono Maru; Genkai Maru; Keian Maru; Rakuto Maru; and Toyo Maru. Rakuto Maru was sunk at position 10°20′N 124°20′E, killing 170 troops and 29 members of her crew.

== Bibliography ==
- Hardy, AC (1954) [1948]. Modern Marine Engineering. Vol. I (revised ed.). London: Caxton Publishing.
- Lloyd's Register of Shipping. Vol. II.–Steamers and Motorships over 300 tons. London: Lloyd's Register of Shipping. 1936 – via Southampton City Council.
- Lloyd's Register of Shipping. Vol. II.–Steamers and Motorships of 300 tons gross and over. London: Lloyd's Register of Shipping. 1938 – via Southampton City Council.
- Lloyd's Register of Shipping. Vol. II.–Steamers and Motorships of 300 tons. Trawlers, tugs, dredgers, etc. London: Lloyd's Register of Shipping. 1939 – via Southampton City Council.
- Lloyd's Register of Shipping. Vol. II.–Steamers and Motorships of 300 tons. Trawlers, tugs, dredgers, etc. London: Lloyd's Register of Shipping. 1943 – via Southampton City Council.
