= SS Adderstone =

British-built cargo steamship with experimental propulsion system

History
- Name: 1920: War Bamboo; 1920: Boswell; 1934: Adderstone; 1937: Germa; 1951: Norway Maru
- Namesake: 1920: James Boswell; 1934: Adderstone
- Owner: 1920: Shipping Controller; 1920: Liverpool, Brazil & River Plate SN Co Ltd; 1934: White Shipping Co Ltd; 1937: Skibs A/S Germa; 1951: Wallem & Co Ltd; 1951: Dai-ichi Kisen KK; 1960: Dai-ichi Chuo Kisen KK
- Operator: 1920: Lamport and Holt; 1937: Johan Gerrard, Jr
- Port of registry: 1920: (United Kingdom) Liverpool, UK; 1934: (United Kingdom) Newcastle, UK; 1937: Kristiansand, Norway; 1951: Panama; 1951: Kobe, Japan; 1965: Osaka, Japan
- Builder: Harland & Wolff, Belfast
- Yard number: 550
- Launched: 1 July 1920
- Completed: 19 November 1920
- Refit: re-engined 1934, 1958
- Identification: UK official number 143686; 1920: code letters KHDF; 1930: call sign GCTV; 1938: call sign IJLW; 1951: Japanese official number 67569; 1951: call sign JBGW; 1969: IMO number: 5257854
- Fate: scrapped

General characteristics
- Class & type: War Standard Type B cargo ship
- Tonnage: 1921: 5,327 GRT, 3,169 NRT; 1934: 5,255 GRT, 3,116 NRT; 1960: 5,333 GRT, 2,997 NRT, 8,109 DWT
- Length: 413.0 ft (125.9 m) overall; 400.4 ft (122.0 m) registered
- Beam: 52.4 ft (16.0 m)
- Draught: 25 ft 4 in (7.7 m)
- Depth: 28.4 ft (8.7 m)
- Decks: 2
- Installed power: 1920: 2 × steam turbines via reduction gearing; 590 NHP; 1934: 1 × compound steam engine via reduction gearing, 1 × exhaust steam turbine via double-reduction gearing; 399 NHP; 1958: 1 × two-stroke diesel engine
- Propulsion: 1 × screw
- Speed: 1920: 11 1/2 knots (21 km/h)
- Sensors & processing systems: by 1934: wireless direction finding; by 1959: echo sounding device, radar

SS Adderstone was a cargo ship that was built in Ireland in 1920. She was launched as the turbine steamship War Bamboo, and for most of her career she was called Boswell (1920–34), Germa (1937–51), or Norway Maru (1951–1968/70). She spent only about three years as Adderstone (1934–37). However, it was as Adderstone that the ship was the test-bed for an innovative development in marine steam propulsion, which used reduction gearing not only for an exhaust steam turbine but also for a high-speed reciprocating steam engine.

Before 1934, the ship's propulsion system was a pair of steam turbines with reduction gearing. In 1958 she was re-engined again, as a motor ship. Thus she had three different propulsion systems in her career.

== War Bamboo ==
Harland & Wolff built the ship to the UK Shipping Controller's War Standard Type B design for dry cargo ships. H&W's Belfast shipyard built her on slipway Number 3 as yard number 550, and launched her on 1 July 1920 as War Bamboo. Her lengths were 413.0 ft (125.9 m) overall and 400.4 ft (122.0 m) registered. Her beam was 52.4 ft (16.0 m), and her depth was 28.4 ft (8.7 m). As built, her tonnages were 5,327 GRT and 3,169 NRT.

H&W built her original engines, which were two steam turbines mounted side by side, either side of the centre-line of the ship. They drove her single screw via reduction gearing. Their combined power was rated at 590 NHP, and gave her a speed of 11 1/2 knots (21 km/h).

== Boswell ==
Lamport and Holt was a shipping company that traded between Liverpool and the east coast of South America. In the First World War L&H lost 11 ships to enemy action, so in 1919 and 1920 it bought, or took over the management of, 14 newly built ships to replace them. 12 of these were War Standards, nine were Type B, and L&H gave each ship a new name. L&H bought Type B ships that various British, Irish and Japanese shipyards had built. It renamed each one after a notable person whose surname begins with B: Biela, Bernini, Bronte, Browning, Bruyere, Balfe, Bonheur, Balzac and Boswell.

L&H bought War Bamboo after she was launched and before she was completed. It renamed her Boswell, after James Boswell (1740–95). H&W completed the ship and delivered her to L&H on 19 November 1920. L&H registered her in Liverpool. Her UK official number was 143686 and her code letters were KHDF. From the beginning of her career, she was equipped with wireless telegraphy. From 1930 she had the four-letter call sign GCTV.

The Great Depression that started in 1929 caused a slump in World shipping. L&H laid up much of its fleet, and by 1935 it sold half of the ships it had owned in 1930. It retained most of its Type Bs, but in 1934 it sold Boswell to a subsidiary of White's Marine Engineering Company on Tyneside.

== Adderstone ==
In 1926 two German engineers, Dr Gustav Bauer and Hans Wach, had increased the efficiency of a triple expansion engine by adding a turbine driven by exhaust steam from the low-pressure cylinder, and adding the power from the turbine to the same propeller shaft via a fluid coupling and double-reduction gearing. This increased both fuel efficiency and power, and gave ship operators the option of either more speed or greater economy. By 1928, British ships such as Boniface were also being built with Bauer-Wach machinery.

White sought to combine a reciprocating engine and a turbine in a way that was more efficient than the Bauer-Wach system. For this, it needed a ship that already had reduction gearing for two engines to drive one propeller shaft. Boswell had this arrangement for her two turbines. Reduction gearing had been used for steam turbines since Vespasian in 1908, but reciprocating engines had continued to be designed and built to drive the propeller directly, and therefore to run at the same slow speed as the propeller.

White bought Boswell, renamed her Adderstone, registered her in Newcastle upon Tyne, and added wireless direction finding to her navigation equipment. They replaced her high-pressure turbine with compound engine that had four cylinders: two high-pressure and two low-pressure. Steam from the boilers passed through a superheater and reheater before entering the high-pressure cylinders. Steam exhausted from the high-pressure cylinders passed through the reheater again before entering the low-pressure cylinders. Hence steam on its way to the high-pressure cylinders re-heated steam on its way to the low-pressure cylinders.

The reciprocating engine drove the propeller shaft via single reduction gearing, which allowed the engine to run several times faster than the propeller. This meant that the reciprocating engine could be much smaller and lighter than in the Bauer-Wach system.

As in the Bauer-Wach system, exhaust steam from White's reciprocating engine powered an exhaust steam turbine which drove the same propeller shaft via double reduction gearing. But because the reciprocating engine had only two stages of expansion, the steam was at higher pressure, and allowed White to use a turbine more powerful than in the Bauer-Wach system. White's system produced about half of its power from the reciprocating engine, and half from the turbine. The combined power of Adderstone's new propulsion system was 399 NHP, which was about a third less than her original set of turbines.

White did not include a fluid coupling to protect the smooth running of the turbine from the cyclical power of the reciprocating engine. Instead, he found that the powerful turbine helped to smooth the running of the reciprocating engine.

Adderstone's new propulsion system was a successful proof of concept. In 1935, White had a new fishing trawler built; White Pioneer; in which he had a scaled-down version of the same propulsion system installed. He then supplied this type of propulsion system for a number of new cargo steamships, including Llanashe, Nailsea Court, and Nailsea Meadow. However, the Bauer-Wach system was easier to install in ships that already had a reciprocating steam engine. Therefore, White's system never became as numerous as the Bauer-Wach system.

White's kept Adderstone until 1937, and then sold her to a Norwegian buyer.

== Germa ==
In 1937 Skibs A/S Germa bought the ship and appointed Johan Gerrard, Junior to manage her. She was renamed Germa, registered in Kristiansand, and given the Norwegian call sign IJLW.

When Germany invaded Norway in April 1940, Germa was in the Far East, steaming from Calcutta to Hong Kong. For the remainder of the Second World War she tramped widely, calling at ports in Burma, India, Egypt, Ceylon, Singapore, Japan, Sarawak, South Africa, Aden, Trinidad, Canada, the United States, Australia, Sierra Leone, the United Kingdom, Italy, the Dominican Republic, Cuba, Puerto Rico, and Newfoundland. She passed through the Suez Canal in both directions in 1940, and once through the Cape Cod Canal in 1945.

In the earlier part of her war career, Germa usually sailed unescorted, apart from Convoys BN 2 and BS 5 in the Indian Ocean in 1940, and Convoy OC 7 along the coast of Australia in July 1942. From October 1940 she sailed mostly in convoys: in the Atlantic Ocean, around the coast of the British Isles, in the Mediterranean and the Caribbean. When Germany surrendered to the Allies in May 1945, Germa was in the North Atlantic, steaming from Belfast to Corner Brook.

In 1950 Wallem & Co Ltd of Hong Kong bought Germa and registered her under the Panamanian flag of convenience. In 1951 she was sold to a Japanese buyer.

== Norway Maru ==
In 1951 Dai-ichi Kisen KK bought Germa, renamed her Norway Maru, and registered her in Kobe. Her Japanese official number was 67569, and her call sign was JBGW. In 1958 her steam engines, both reciprocating and turbine, were removed, and replaced with a six-cylinder single-acting two-stroke diesel engine built by the Niigata Engineering Company, Ltd. By 1959 her navigation equipment included an echo sounding device and radar. From 1960, Norway Maru's owners were Dai-ichi Chuo KK. In 1965, her ownership passed to Fujita Kaiji Kogyo KK, who registered her in Osaka.

Norway Maru was scrapped at Sakai in Japan. Sources disagree as to whether this was in 1968, or the first quarter of 1970. However, when seven-digit IMO numbers were introduced in 1969, Norway Maru was numbered 5257854.

== Bibliography ==
- Hardy, AC (1954) [1948]. Modern Marine Engineering. Vol. I (revised ed.). London: Caxton Publishing.
- Heaton, Paul M (2004). Lamport & Holt Line. Abergavenny: PM Heaton Publishing. ISBN 1-872006-16-7.
- Lloyd's Register of Shipping. Vol. II.–Steamers. London: Lloyd's Register of Shipping. 1922 – via Internet Archive.
- Lloyd's Register of Shipping (PDF). Vol. II.–Steamers and Motorships of 300 tons gross and over. London: Lloyd's Register of Shipping. 1934 – via Southampton City Council.
- Lloyd's Register of Shipping (PDF). Vol. II.–Steamers and Motorships of 300 tons gross and over. London: Lloyd's Register of Shipping. 1938 – via Southampton City Council.
- Lloyd's Register of Shipping. Vol. I. A–L. London: Lloyd's Register of Shipping. 1951 – via Internet Archive.
- Lloyd's Register of Shipping. Vol. II. M–Z. London: Lloyd's Register of Shipping. 1952 – via Internet Archive.
- Lloyd's Register of Shipping. London: Lloyd's Register of Shipping. 1958 – via Internet Archive.
- Lloyd's Register of Shipping. London: Lloyd's Register of Shipping. 1959 – via Internet Archive.
- Mercantile Navy List. London. 1930 – via Crew List Index Project.
