= Evan Thomas, Radcliffe and Company =

Former British shipowning company

Messrs. Evan Thomas, Radcliffe and Company
- House flag
- Company type: Limited Company
- Industry: Shipping
- Founded: 1882, as Messrs. Evan Thomas, Radcliffe and Company in Cardiff, UK
- Headquarters: Cardiff, UK
- Area served: Worldwide
- Key people: Captain Evan Thomas, Henry Radcliffe (founders)

Evan Thomas, Radcliffe and Company was one of the more prosperous and better-known of Cardiff-based shipowning companies, established in 1882 by a Ceredigion sea captain, Evan Thomas, and a Merthyr Tydfil businessman, Henry Radcliffe. Until 1939 one of the main trades of the company was to carry Welsh steam coal, which reached its peak in the years immediately before World War I. The company was ceased trading in the 1980s.

== History ==
=== Origins ===
In 1881, Evan Thomas, a Master Mariner from Aberporth in Ceredigion who had served with Jones Bros. of Newport an JH Anning of Cardiff, went into partnership with Henry Radcliffe, a Merthyr Tydfil businessman and they bought their first ship together. The combination of master mariner and businessman as partners was not uncommon at this time in Cardiff.

It was not hard for the partners to raise money to buy their first ship, with most of the capital being raised in Wales. The partners risked very little of their own money, instead buying the ship on mortgage. The capital being raised as shares in a single ship company.

=== Evan Thomas ===
Captain Evan Thomas (1832–91)

Captain Evan Thomas was a master mariner from the West Wales village of Aberporth in Ceredigion. His family lived at Dolwen, a substantial house overlooking the beach.

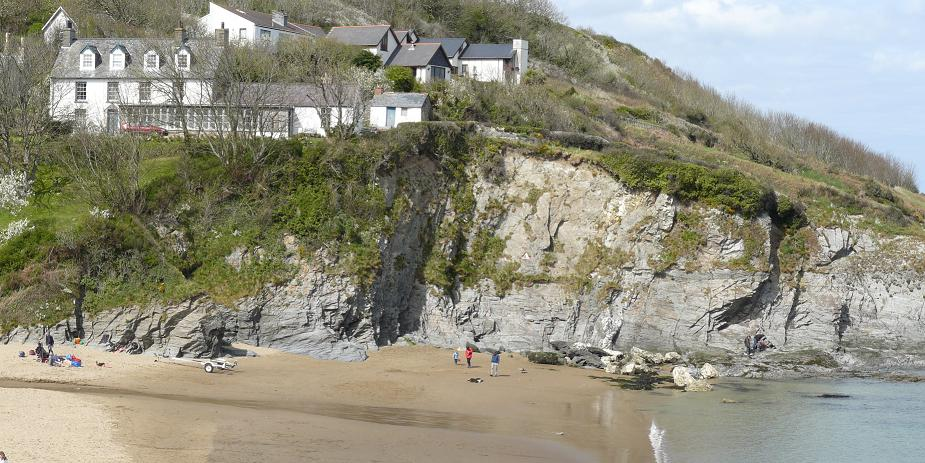
Dôl-wen, Aberporth

He was the son of Hezekiah Thomas (1805–1869) who owned a 47-ton ketch, Pheasant, and part-owner of a number of other vessels. From Aberporth coal and limestone was imported by coastal vessels from South Pembrokeshire and Cardigan Bay. Evan Thomas's brother, Thomas Thomas (1836–1911) was a part-time sailor, part-time farmer, and became secretary of the Aberporth Mutual Ship Insurance Society.

Capt. Evan Thomas obtained his master's certificate and after eight years as Master in Steam in the tramps of the Baltic, Mediterranean, Black Sea, and United States of America proposed the setting up of a new ship-owning company in Cardiff, the booming coal metropolis.

Evan Thomas commanded Gwenllian Thomas, the first ship bought by Evan Thomas, Radcliffe.

Gwenllian Thomas 1882

By 1884 Evan Thomas gave up the sea, and on his death at the age of 59 on 14 November 1891 the company he had established less than ten years previously owned 15 tramp steamships.

Evan Thomas had a son and four daughters.

=== Henry Radcliffe ===
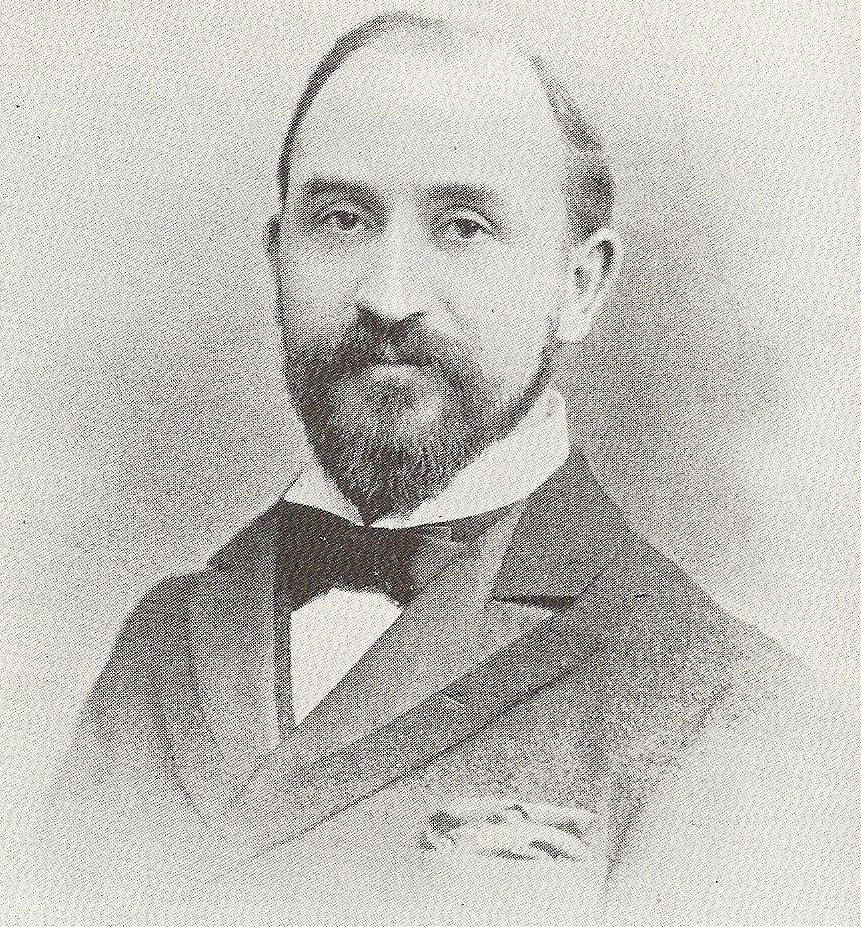
Henry Radcliffe (1857–1921)

Henry Radcliffe (1857–1921) was a businessman from Merthyr Tydfil, an important Welsh industrial town. On the death of Evan Thomas in 1891, Henry Radcliffe took into partnership his younger brother Daniel. Henry Radcliffe died in 1921 at the age of 66 at his home in Druidstone, St Mellons. He left a son, Wyndham Ivor Radcliffe and two daughters, Clarissa Gwendoline Gwynne Maitland and Sarah Ethel Radcliffe.

He was an extensive owned of land in the Vale of Glamorgan and held shares in a large number of companies in South Wales including the Taff Vale Railway, Barry Railway Co., Vale of Glamorgan Railway Co., Tempus Shipping Co., Cardiff Port Iron & Coal Storage Co., North's Navigation Collieries Ltd., Great Western Colliery Co. Ltd., P. & A. Campbell Ltd., Cambrian Railways, Alexandra Docks Newport and Guest Keen & Nettlefolds.

On the death of Henry Radcliffe, chairmanship of the company passed on to his younger brother Daniel.

=== Daniel Radcliffe ===
Daniel Radcliffe of Tal-y-werydd, Penylan, Cardiff, joined the company at the age of 24 in 1892 having previously worked for Cardiff shipowners JH Anning and the Turnbull Brothers. On joining the company he promoted rapid growth with the result that in 1900 the business owned a total of 24 ships.

Daniel Radcliffe died on 29 March 1933.

=== Early years ===
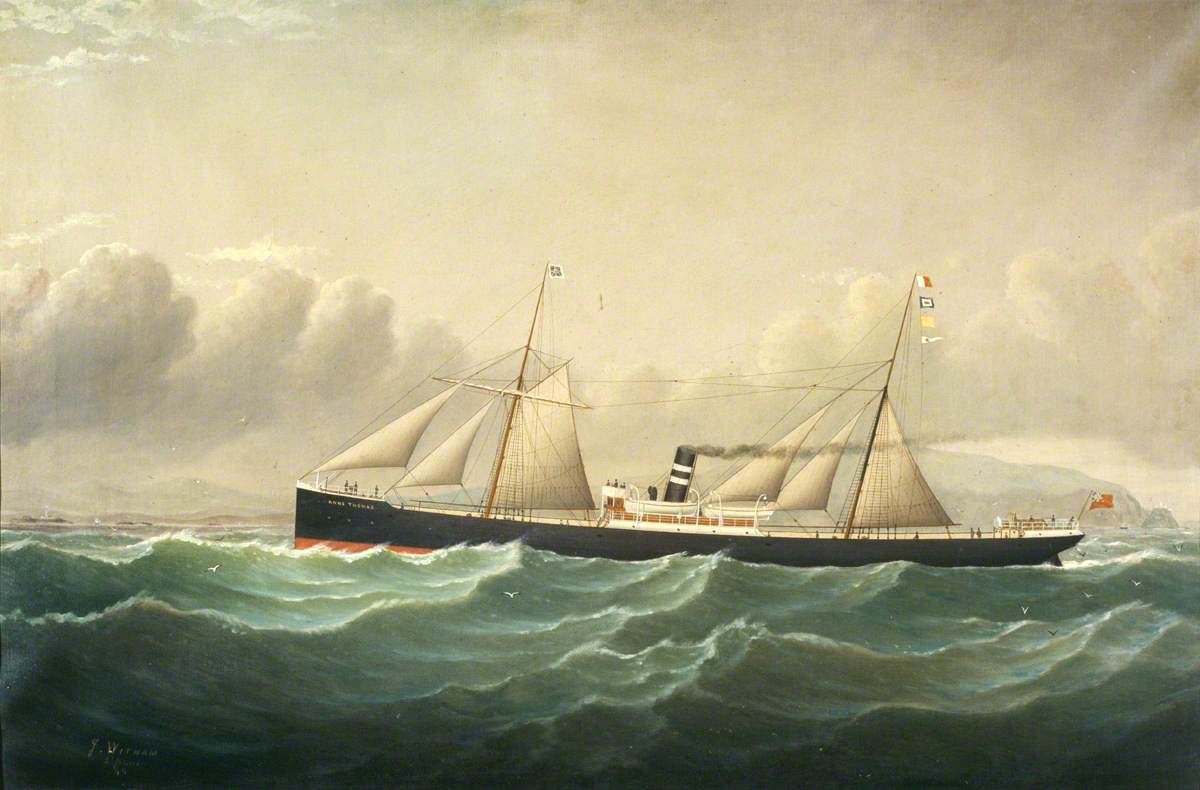
SS 'Anne Thomas' of Cardiff, by Joseph Witham

As Evan Thomas, Radcliffe's business succeeded, more and more ships were added to the fleet. As many as 31 single-ship companies were registered in the company's name. Gwenllian Thomas went to sea under the command of Evan Thomas, his partner taking charge of the office at 4 Dock Chambers and all the chartering arrangements. In 1882, a second ship, Iolo Morganwg (1,292 tons) was bought from Palmers Shipbuilding and Iron Company of Jarrow who has already built Gwenllian Thomas. In 1883 came Kate Thomas (1,588 tons) and Anne Thomas (1,419 tons) followed by Wynnstay (1,542 tons) in 1884. Around this time Evan Thomas gave up the sea.

=== The Black Sea trade ===
All the Evan Thomas, Radcliffe ships were tramp steamers, sailing not along fixed routes but to whatever port in the world the charterers wished. Nevertheless, from 1882 when the company was established until about 1914 there was a pattern of trading with the ships taking out cargoes of coal from the Tyne ports and South Wales to west European or Mediterranean ports, then proceeding in ballast to the Black Sea, to such ports as Odessa, Taranrog and Novorossisk, returning to British, but more likely a continental port, with grain. This became so much the normal pattern of trading that the annual reports of the company constantly refer to the Black Sea traffic.

This pattern of trading was repeated for almost all the Evan Thomas, Radcliffe ships with little variation until 1912–13 when there was a decline in the trade. Gradually the Black Sea trade declined and Evan Thomas, Radcliffe, in common with other Cardiff shipowners, had to look elsewhere for their trade. The Black Sea trade in its heyday was a very lucrative business and the carriage of coal from South Wales outwards and grain from southern Russia inwards really provided the basis of success for Evan Thomas, Radcliffe. Ships rarely sailed in ballast except for short voyages from the points of discharge of coal to the Black Sea and from continental ports to Cardiff or Barry.

The Black Sea trade did continue until the early years of the First World War, but some of the ships were making more frequent appearances in America and south east Asia. For example, Washington, from its construction in 1907 until December 1912, was concerned exclusively with the carriage of coal from South Wales to the Mediterranean and the carriage of grain from the Black Sea ports to Hamburg, Rotterdam and Marseille. In December 1912 she sailed from Barry with a cargo of coal from Rio de Janeiro. She then returned from Bahía Blanca to London with grain and left on another voyage from Barry to Rio de Janeiro returning to Rotterdam with general cargo from New Orleans. She then returned to the Black Sea trade for another five voyages before sailing in ballast after unloading coal at Taranto for Pondicherry, returning with a cargo of ground nuts for Marseille. She then sailed across the Atlantic to New Orleans returning to Marseille in February 1914 with a cargo of wheat.

Llangorse, another example, was used exclusively for the normal Black Sea coal and grain trade from 1907 to 1912; she then crossed the Atlantic to Baltimore returning to Hamburg with grain. After six more voyages to the Black Sea the ship visited Galveston, La Plata, Buenos Aires, Philadelphia, Rosario, San Nicholas and Aguilas being concerned with the transport of grain and iron ore, to Naples, Barcelona, Glasgow, Genoa and Avonmouth. Gradually, the trans-Atlantic trade was becoming more and more important in the activities of Cardiff shipowners.

=== First World War ===
At the outbreak of the First World War in 1914, Evan Thomas, Radcliffe was the largest of the Cardiff shipowners owning a fleet of 28 ships. In the war the company lost 20 ships.

=== Post-war depression ===
Although substantial sums of money were received in compensation for the ships lost in the war, Evan Thomas, Radcliffe, unlike some other Cardiff shipowning companies, did not immediately enter the post-war market for very expensive ships. In 1919, the company owned only nine ships, with a total gross tonnage of 41,254. The company bought only one ship, Ethel Radcliffe, in 1920 as a replacement for the 20 ships lost in the war. As a result the company was well able to weather the storm of the slump in the 1920s.

The one new ship, Ethel Radcliffe, of 5,673 gross tons was built for the company by Craig Taylor & Co. of Stockton-on-Tees at a very inflated price of £274,019. She sailed on her maiden voyage under the command of Captain M Mathias of Cardigan with a cargo of coal for Port Said. She then sailed in ballast to Mauritius returning to London with a cargo of sugar, then to Norfolk, Virginia in ballast to return to Immingham with a cargo of coal.

In 1919 and 1920 many of Evan Thomas, Radcliffe's ships were time chartered to other companies, but 1921 saw the slump really biting with the result that many of the company's ships were laid up for extended periods because no cargoes were available for them. Despite this, some of the Evan Thomas, Radcliffe ships were fully occupied in the first few years of the 1920s, although substantial losses were made on many of the voyages. Despite the fact that some of the ships were in constant employ in the early twenties, the golden era was obviously over and the annual reports of the various single ship companies that made up Evan Thomas, Radcliffe & Company reflect the general gloom and depression that seemed to have prevailed among the Cardiff shipowners in the early twenties.

In anticipation of those better times, Evan Thomas, Radcliffe began to invest money in new ships in 1925. The new ships were considerably cheaper than Ethel Radcliffe of 1920, built when the prices of new and old ships were very inflated. Nevertheless, in the 1920s substantial losses were made in the trading of all the ships.

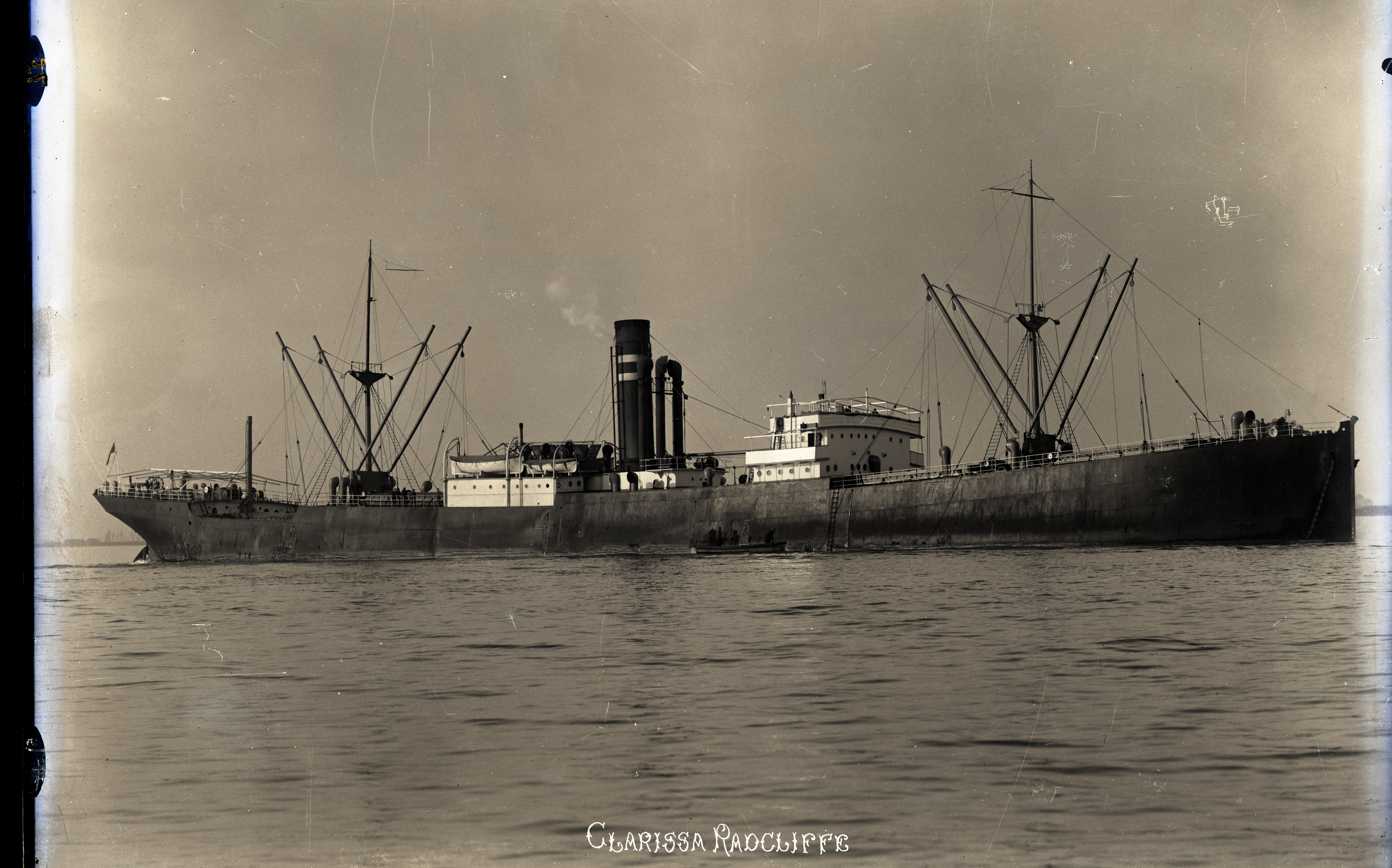
Clarissa Radcliffe: acquired in 1917, and lost with all hands in 1943

The Great Depression that started in 1929 caused a worldwide slump in merchant shipping. After a few years trade began to recover, and the company invested in two new ships from Bartram & Sons of Sunderland: the sister ships Llanashe launched in 1936, and Llandaff launched in 1937. These two sister ships each had a four-cylinder compound engine with single-reduction gearing, plus an exhaust steam turbine with double-reduction gearing: a system devised by White's Marine Engineering Company to maximise efficiency, and hence fuel economy.

=== Second World War ===
Evan Thomas, Radcliffe lost 11 ships in the Second World War.

- 28 June 1940 – Llanarth – torpedoed off Lands End 47°30′N 10°30′W on voyage from Melbourne with flour.
- 11 August 1940 – Llanfair – torpedoed on a voyage from Mackay and Bowen (Queensland) to UK with sugar 54°48′N 13°46′W.
- 23 August 1940 – Llanishen – sunk by air attack southeast of Wick 58°17′N 2°27′W on voyage from Three Rivers (Quebec) to Leith with maize.
- 26 February 1941 – Llanwern – bombed by aircraft off southwest coast of Ireland. 54°N 17°W on voyage from Sorel (Quebec) with grain and timber for Avonmouth.
- 17 April 1941 – Ethel Radcliffe – torpedoed by an E-boat off the East Anglian coast on a voyage from Saint John, New Brunswick to Great Yarmouth with maize. Beached on Yarmouth sands, but bombed and made total loss on 14 May 1941.
- 12 May 1942 – Llanover – torpedoed in North Atlantic 52°50′N 29°04′W on voyage from New York and Halifax, Nova Scotia for London with wheat, apples and tanks.
- 2 November 1942 – Llandilo – torpedoed south of Saint Helena on voyage from New York. 27°03′S 02°59′W.
- 17 February 1943 – Llanashe – torpedoed off Port Elizabeth 34°00′S 28°30′E on voyage from New York.
- 18 March 1943 – Clarissa Radcliffe – torpedoed with loss of all hands, 42°00′N 62°00′W on voyage from Pepel with iron ore.
- 30 May 1943 – Llancarfan – sunk by air attack 2 nautical miles (3.7 km) south of Cape St. Vincent while on a voyage from Glasgow to Lisbon and Malta with coal and coke.
- 30 March 1944 – Vera Radcliffe – handed over to the Ministry of War Transport (MoWT) for use as a blockship on Normandy beaches.

This left the company with a greatly depleted fleet, for only five ships survived the war. They were Llanberis, Llangollen, Peterston, Flimston and Llandaff. UK ships were lost much faster than they could be replaced and the Government decided that it would be impossible to back a new shipbuilding programme entirely in this country which was so vulnerable to enemy attack. Therefore a British Merchant Shipbuilding Mission left for the USA in September 1940 and the terms of its brief was to endeavour to obtain at the earliest possible moment the delivery of merchant tonnage...of vessels of the tramp type of about 10,000 tons deadweight.

Canadian shipyards built 198 Fort ships and US shipyards supplied Ocean and Liberty ships. Evan Thomas, Radcliffe obtained six of these ships together with Samskern, a ship lent to the MoWT under the Lease-Lend system at a charter rate of a dollar a year.

With the great depletion in the fleet as a result of war, the company was forced to look elsewhere for extra tonnage. It bought US and Canadian standard ships of the Fort type.

=== Latter years ===
The period after 1945 was a period of reconstruction and rebuilding, but Evan Thomas, Radcliffe, in common with all other South Wales shipowners, never repeated the prosperity of the period before the First World War. Cardiff saw a gradual decline in the fortunes of its docks as coal exports diminished. Cardiff was, above all, a coal exporting port and it was on this that its fortunes had been built. Many of the Cardiff tramp steamers were concerned in the coal trade and the ships owned by Evan Thomas, Radcliffe were mainly designed for transporting coal.

The company had to look elsewhere for its freight and with the change of ownership to the Evans and Reid group, as a fully integrated company within the group after some years in partnership with Evans and Reid, the Radcliffe fleet became mainly an oil tanker fleet.

In 1946 the company had only five ships of its own: Llanberis (built 1928); Llangollen (built 1928); Peterston (built 1925); Flimston (built 1925) and Llandaff (built 1937). It was operating another eight standard ships on behalf of the Ministry of Transport or on charter.

The pattern of trading had changed considerably. The tankers mainly carried oil from the Persian Gulf, Sumatra and elsewhere to European ports, but the other steamers – Llanover and Llanwern were concerned with worldwide tramping, rarely visiting their home port of Cardiff.

In 1950 and 1951 too, the pre-war ships Llandaff and Llangollen were sold which left the company with only one ship, the tanker Llanishen of 1945 with a new motor ship, Llantrisant, a freighter of 6,140 tons being built by Bartram's. She was launched on 27 March 1952 and delivered to her owners on 5 September 1952. She was in the fleet for five years as a worldwide tramp. In 1957 she was sold to a Vancouver company as Lake Burnaby.

In the early 1950s the company had few ships, so a number were chartered. After the delivery of Llantrisant in 1952, another new ship, the oil tanker Llandaff was built by Lithgows of Port Glasgow. She remain in the fleet until 1960, for much of the time being chartered to Anglo-Saxon Petroleum. but on 16 February 1960 she was sold to the Island Shipping Company of Bermuda.

In 1957 Bartram's delivered a new motor ship, the freighter Llantrisant. The next year Swan Hunter at Wallsend delivered the oil tanker Llanishen. In 1960 the tanker Hamilton, built at Tamise, Belgium, was delivered on time charter and the Furness Shipbuilding Company of Haverton Hill delivered the tanker Llangorse. In October 1962 Bartrams delivered the freighter Llanwern.

In 1964–5 therefore, the Evan Thomas, Radcliffe fleet comprised five ships. By 1970 Llanwern and Llantrisant had been sold and in 1971 SA Boelwerf of Tamise, Belgium delivered Stolt Llandaff, the last ship to be built for the company. She was a specialised oil and chemical tanker and remained as an Evan Thomas, Radcliffe ship on charter to the company from the Stolt Corporation of Monrovia until December 1981. With the sale of Hamilton, Llangorse and Llanishen, Stolt Llandaff remained the sole ship in the fleet until 1980 when two small coastal ships, Radcliffe Trader and Radcliffe Venturer, were bought.

== Fleet ==
Ship	Built	GRT	Length, Beam, Draft (ft)	Notes
Aden	1905	2,482	313.5x43.8x13.3	Aden 1905 Built by W. Rodgers & Co., Port Glasgow as Craigmore for Craig Line S.G.Co. Bought in 1908; 1915 – sold to Colonial Coal & Shipping Co. as Thysa later renamed Kostis; 1934 – sold as Azbassein; 1936 – sold to USSR as Georgi Dimitrov
Alex	1914	3,907	380x51.5x22.1	Built by J. Priestland, Sunderland as Constantinos XII; then Ionia, then Nicos; 1938 – Bought by ETR and named Alex; 1943 – sold to S. Casteli & Co. – no change of name 1946 – renamed Noemi; 5 June 1958 – scrapped at Split
Alma	1896	2,863		Built by J. Priestland, Sunderland. Managed on behalf of Shipping Controller 1919–26
Anne Thomas	1882	1,418	260x35.3x17.8	Anne Thomas 1882 Built by Palmers Shipbuilding and Iron Co of Jarrow Sold Grogstad & Co., Norway and renamed Lord
Anthony Radcliffe	1893	2,865	315x42x20'11"	Built by Palmers Shipbuilding and Iron Co of Jarrow; 1908 – renamed Bonvilston; Attacked three times in 1916 and 1917 and was finally sunk by torpedo 17 October 1918, 9.5 nautical miles (17.6 km) northwest by west of Corsewall Point
Asgard	1906	4,181	360x48x20	Built by Northumberland Shipbuilding Co. Ltd. Managed on behalf of Shipping Controller 1919–20
Bala	1884	2,013	280x35.7x20.1	Built by William Gray & Co., West Hartlepool; Sold in December 1903 to the Glanhowny S.S. Co. (Bartlett & Owen) as Glanhowny. Like Evan Thomas, Capt. Thomas Owen was a native of Aberporth and HA Bartlett was a Cardiff businessman. The ship was sold for £8,750 and sailed under the command of Thomas Owen, who died aboard her on her third voyage to the Black Sea.
Balingdale	1949			She was a managed ship. Bought from Societo al Navigazione Tomei, Genoa, 29 April 1949.
Boverton	1910	2,958	325x46x23.4	Boverton 1910 Built by John Blumer & Co., North Dock, Sunderland for £26,500; 3 May 1928 – name changed to Llangorse; 20 February 1930 – sold to Tallinn Shipping Co. of Estonia for £17,244 and renamed Maret; Seized by U.S. (USMC) June 6, 1941 and renamed Sysonby with Panamanian registry 28 September 1951 – Broken up
Catherine Radcliffe	1925	5,589	415x55x28	Built by Craig, Taylor & Co., Stockton-on-Tees at a cost of £99,439; 22 February 1935. Abandoned after stranding off coast of Japan (Master – T. Owens, Aberporth) Insured for £70,868
Clarissa Radcliffe	1889	2,544	296x40.2x20.6	Built by Palmers Shipbuilding and Iron Co of Jarrow; On a voyage from Odessa to Rotterdam with a cargo of grain, the ship met a gale off Cape St. Vincent on 30 December 1897. The cargo shifted and the ship sank with the loss of 16 lives.
Clarissa Radcliffe	1904	4,703	351.5x53.1x27.6	Built by Ropner, Stockton-on-Tees (Yard No. 410). A trunk-decked ship 1913 – Renamed Llanover; 1917 – Renamed Llangorse; 1926 – Sold to Watts, Watts & Co. as Laleham for £17,758; 1930 – Sold to A. A. Kyrtaras, Andros as Marionga D. Thermiotis; 1947 – Sold to Ciu de Nav. Ponanza Ltd., Panama – Antonios K 25 May 1952 – scrapped at Milford Haven
Clarissa Radcliffe	1915	6,042	415x55.5x28.7	Built by Craig Taylor & Co., Stockton-on-Tees in 1915 as Windsor at a cost of £251,000; 1916 – Renamed Gwent; 1917 – Renamed Clarissa Radcliffe; On 5 March 1943 the ship left New York for Barrow-in-Furness; a straggler within convoy SC 122. She had a crew of 41 and 10 gunners. She was torpedoed on 18 March by U-663 in position 42°0′N 62°0′W. There were no survivors.
Douglas Hill	1890	2,171	285x37.8x20	Built by Palmers Shipbuilding and Iron Co of Jarrow; March 1908 – name changed to Iolo; August 1909 – sold to Frederick Childs – Selworthy; Lost March 1910.
Dunraven	1896	3,333	338x46x27	Built by Ropner of Stockton-on-Tees, launched 2 October 1896. The name of the vessel was changed to Sarah Radcliffe on delivery of a new Dunraven in 1910. Sunk 11 November 1916 by submarine U-50 170 nautical miles (310 km) southwest of Ushant.
Dunraven	1910	3,117	341x48x24'41.5"	Built by Tyne Iron Shipbuilding Co. Willington Quay on Tyne. 1917 – Transferred to Royal Navy as a Q-ship; 10 August 1917 – sunk by torpedo and guns of submarine UC-71 in Bay of Biscay. Two Victoria Crosses were awarded, one to the ship's First Lieutenant, Lt. Charles George Bonner RNR, and the other, by ballot, to a gunlayer, Petty Officer Ernest Herbert Pitcher.
Empire Eddystone	1945	7,318	431x56x38	Built by Wm. Gray, West Hartlepool
Empire Prospect	1945	7,331	431x38x38	Built by Shipbuilding Corporation Ltd, Newcastle upon Tyne; 1947 – Sold to Goulandris Brothers Ltd, London and renamed Ronald M Scobie 1954 – Renamed Plover; 1965 – Sold to Kowloon Carriers Inc and renamed Kowloon Venture. Operated under the management of Wah Kwong & Co (Hong Kong) Ltd. 27 April 1969 – Scrapped at Kaohsiung, Taiwan
Ethel Radcliffe	1920	5,673	415x55x28.9	Built by Craig Taylor & Co., Stockton-on-Tees. Cost £274,019; 17 April 1941 – Damaged by E-boat and put into port at Great Yarmouth. 16 May 1941 – The ship was sunk by air attack in Great Yarmouth
Euston	1898	2,728	330x44x24.3	Euston 1910 Built by Ropner & Son, Stockton-on-Tees. Delivered 19 July 1898; 1910 – name changed to Gileston; 1926 – sold to Greek owners for £8,400 as Haralampos P. 1929 sold to W. G. Walton, Cyprian Shipping Co. Ltd. as Danubian; 18 February 1954 – stranded in fog off Kilyos in Black Sea on voyage in ballast from Alexandria to Constanza.
Flimston	1916	5,751	415x55.5x26.7	Built by Craig Taylor & Co., Stockton-on-Tees. 18 December 1916 – captured and scuttled by a German submarine U-70 21 nautical miles (39 km) northeast by east from Ushant.
Flimston	1925	4,674	385x52x26	Flimston 1925 Built by Bartram, South Dock, Sunderland. 1948 – sold to Woodham S.S. Co. Cardiff as Woodham Rover; 1950 – sold to Schulte & Bruns as Konsul Schulte; 14 January 1960 scrapped at Tamise.
Fort La Traite (Managed Vessel)	1942	7,134	424x57x37.5	Built by West Coast Shipbuilding, Vancouver.
Fort Miami (Managed Vessel)	1942	7,134	424x57.2x37.5	Built by Vancouver Ship Repairers Ltd., Vancouver.
Fort Richelieu (Managed Vessel)	1943	7,150	424x57.2x37.5	Built by Marine Industries Ltd., Soull, Quebec.
Fort Remy (Managed Vessel)	1942	7,127	424x57x37.5	Built by United Shipyards Ltd., Montreal; In fleet 1942–49
Fort Rupert (Managed Vessel)	1942	7,141	424x57x37.6	Built by Grand Trunk Pacific Development Co. Ltd. Prince Rupert, British Columbia; In fleet 1946–49
Fort Saleesh (Managed Vessel)	1943	7,167	424x57.2x37.5	Built by North Vancouver Shiprepairers Ltd.
Granton Glen	1918	2,485	257x43.8x20	Built by Manitoba S. B. Co., Wis. ex. Catherine, Stratford, Lake Greenwood. Owned by Culliford Shipping Co. Ltd., liquidated 1947, management of vessel taken over by ETR for 1 year.
Gwenllian Thomas	1882	1,082	233x31.2x17	Built by Palmers Shipbuilding and Iron Co of Jarrow; Delivered Cardiff 24 June 1882 and sailed with a cargo of coal for Saint-Nazaire, returning to Cardiff with iron ore from Bilbao. She was commanded by Capt. Evan Thomas. Sold December 1905 as Richard
Gwent	1909	3,344	330x48x23	Built 1901 as Evangeline by R Thomson, Sunderland; Bought from Anglo-Grecian S.S. Co. 1909 for £17,350; 1912 – sold for £22,589 to London-Piraeus S.S. Co. Sain Dimitrios; 2 March 1918 – sunk
Hamilton	1960	13,186	560x72x30.9	Hamilton 1960 Tanker built by C. Boel et Fils, Tamise, Belgium. Launched 28 January 1960. Still in service as Feoso Sun.
Hanley	1902	3,331	326x48x23	Built by J.L. Thompson and Sons, Sunderland, for Woodruff Shillito & Co., Cardiff in 1902. Bought immediately by Evan Thomas Radcliffe; April 1912 – sold to Tom Lewis & Co. 30 May 1917 – sunk off Irish coast by torpedo from submarine U-87 95 nautical miles (176 km) W of Bishops Rock – 1 life lost.
Helemar	1957	544	187x29x12	Charter by ETR 6 March 1957 (Owners Velmont S.S. Co.); Sold to Pieter Hougerverff, Deest (the Netherlands) 23 July 1958; Still sailing as Hamnfiord
High Park (Managed Vessel)	1943	7,143	424x57x37	Built by Davie Shipbuilding, Lauzon-Levis, Quebec.
Iolo Morganwg	1882	1,241	251x33.25x18	Iolo 1898 Built by Palmers Shipbuilding and Iron Co of Jarrow; Sold December 1905 as Pontus, later Held (Swedish flag)
Jane Radcliffe	1890	1,830	271x37x18	Jane Radcliffe 1890 Built by Ropner, Stockton-on-Tees; August 1911 – sold to Otto Weens of Malmö, named Hjalma
Kate Thomas	1884	1,557	269x36.4x18	Built by Palmers Shipbuilding and Iron Co of Jarrow; Lost near Ceuta 21 October 1895 on voyage from Cardiff to Brindisi with coal.
Lady Palmer	1889	2,752	322x40x24	Built by Palmers Shipbuilding and Iron Co of Jarrow for Hall Bros., Newcastle upon Tyne; Chartered by Daniel Radcliffe 1890–91; Sunk in Dover Straits 1891.
Llanberis	1890	2,269	290x38x22.4	Llanberis 1890 Built by Ropner, Stockton-on-Tees for £34,000; Jan 1910 – name changed to Badminton; 10 February 1912 – sold for £8,500 to Coroniadis Bros. – Coroniadis; 1914 – sold as Malgas; 1916 – sold as Georgios Markettos
Llanberis	1927	5,055	400x53x28	Built by Hawthorn Leslie and Company, Wallsend for 86,573; Launched 12 October 1927; 1950 (17 February) sold to Basil J. Mauros, Piraeus as Theoskepasti; 1956 – sold as Valente
Llancarfan	1937	4,910	401x53x26.6	Built by White's Marine Engineering Company, Hebburn as Biddlestone for White Shipping Co., Newcastle. 1940 – Bought and renamed Llancarfan; 30 May 1943 – sunk by air attack 2 nautical miles (3.7 km) south of Cape St. Vincent.
Llandaff	1937	4,826	417x56x251	Llandaff 1937 Built Bartram, Sunderland. First voyage to Port Said – Poti – Baltimore under the command of JR Jenkins, Aberporth. 1 October 1951 – sold to KG Bornhofen of Hamburg as Max Bornhofen; 1959 – sold to Greek owners as Pilastassios; Ran aground Esbjerg 20 February 1959, refloated 7 March 1959. Scrapped at Ghent 10 September 1959.
Llandaff	1953	12,501	556x73x31	Llandaff 1953 Built at Lithgows of Glasgow. Launched 26 January 1952; 17 February 1960 – sold to Island Shipping Co., Bermuda as Wheat King.
Llandilo	1928	4,966	400x53x26	Built by Bartram & Sons, Sunderland. Delivered 6 February 1928. Maiden voyage Tyne – Algiers (Coal) – Rosario – La Plata – Hamburg (grain) under the command of T Jones, Aberarth. (Twm Cadno) 2 November 1942 torpedoed southeast of Saint Helena by submarine U-172 in position 27°3′S 2°59′W
Llandrindod	1900	3,841	351x48x28.4	Built by Richardson, Duck & Co, Thornaby-on-Tees; 18 May 1917 – sunk by torpedo from submarine U-46 165 nautical miles (306 km) northwest by west of Fastnet.
Llandudno	1897	4,074	350x46.6x27.3	Built by Ropner & Son, Stockton-on-Tees. Delivered 26 July 1897; 1910 – renamed Llanberis; 1927 – sold to Richards, Longstaff & Co., London as Yorkminster.
Llandudno	1910	4,186	362x50x27	Built by Tyne Iron Shipbuilding Co., Willington Quay-on-Tyne. 1 August 1917 – Captured and sunk by submarine U-33 110 nautical miles (200 km) southwest of Porquerolles Island, Gulf of Lyons. 1 lost life.
Llanfair	1928	4,966	400x53.4x26	Llanfair 1928 Built by Bartram & Sons, Sunderland. Maiden voyage to Port Said with coal, Cuba to Liverpool with sugar (Master Samuel H Mathias, Newport, Pembrokeshire); 11 October 1940 – torpedoed by U-38 54°48′N 13°46′W.
Llangollen	1900	3,842	351x48x28.4	Built by Richardson, Duck & Co, Thornaby-on-Tees. Cost £49,371; Sold 4 October 1926 to Greece as Issidoro for £13,500. The vessel completed 81 voyages for Evan Thomas Radcliffe.
Llangollen	1928	5,055	400x53x26	Llangollen 1928 Built by Hawthorn Leslie & Co, Wallsend Cost £86,990 (1st Master – D. G. Evans, New Quay); 8 February 1950 – sold to Nicholas A Simbouras, Athens, as Aretis; 1952 – sold as Maria Christina; 1960 – sold as Kettara II; 7 February 1960 – scrapped as Nagoya
Llangorse	1900	3,841	351x48x28.4	Built by Richardson, Duck & Co, Thornaby-on-Tees. Cost £45,114; 8 September 1916 – torpedoed by UB–47 48 nautical miles (89 km) west-southwest of Cape Matapan. Insured for £120,450.
Llangorse	1960	21,840		Tanker built, Furness Shipbuilding Co, Haverton Hill. Delivered August 1960. In fleet until about 1966
Llanishen	1901	3,836	340x48x26	Built by Richardson, Duck & Co, Thornaby-on-Tees; 9 August 1917 – torpedoed by submarine U-33 and beached 8 nautical miles (15 km) north by east of Cape of Crevs, Gulf of Lyon. Total loss.
Llanishen	1929	5,052	400x54x25.9	Built by Bartram, Sunderland for £82,568. Delivered 29 April 1929 and left on maiden voyage from the Tyne to Santos with coal (Master R Roberts, Aberdyfi, Merionethshire); 23 October 1941 – sunk by air attack southeast of Wick. 58°17′N 2°27′W.
Llanishen	1944	10,735	506x68x39	Llanishen 1944 Tanker built as Rye Cove. Bought from the MoWT in 1947. 31 May 1956 – sold to Panama as Anna O 25 December 1962 – arrived Castellon, Spain for scrapping.
Llanishen	1957	20,976	635x64x34	Tanker built Swan Hunter & Wigham Richardson, Wallsend; Delivered 17 January 1958. Renamed Petrola 19
Llanover	1899	3,840	351x48x28.4	Built by Richardson, Duck & Co, Thornaby-on-Tees; Renamed Paddington February 1913; Renamed Iolo February 1917; Torpedoed and sunk by submarine U-60 42 nautical miles (78 km) southwest of Fastnet 17 February 1917. 2 dead Master, Chief Engineer and 2 gunners taken prisoner.
Llanover	1917	4,240	390x53x23	Built by Pickersgill, Sunderland; 1917 – sold to Johnston Line as Linmore; 1920 – sold to Dr. T. G. Adams as Shannonmede; 1924 – sold to Edw. Nichol & Co. as Littleton; 1932 – sold to Heirs of L. Z. Cambanis, Andros as Leonidas Z. Cambanis; 3 April 1941 – torpedoed by U-74 southeast of Cape Farewell.
Llanover	1928	4,959	400x53x26	Built by Bartram, Sunderland (Launched 4 November 1927) Master John James, Aberporth. 12 May 1942 – torpedoed by submarine U-124 North Atlantic 52°50′N 29°4′W.
Llanover	1944	7,281	424x57x35	Built by Brunswick, Georgia, USA by JA Jones Construction Inc. as Samlorian and sold in 1944 to Strath S. S. Co. of Cardiff as Helmspey. 27 October 1949 – Bought by ETR – renamed Llanover. 19 November 1951 – sold to Liberian Shipping Inc as Capestar; 1960 – Resold as Athlos
Llantrisant	1952	6,140	460x62x30	Motor vessel built by Bartram, Sunderland. Delivered 5 September 1952; 1957 – sold to Western Canadian S.S. Co., Vancouver as Lake Burnaby; 3 November 1958 – stranded on Bancoran Reef, Philippines – total loss.
Llantrisant	1957	6,171	477.6x62x30.8	Built by Bartram, Sunderland. Delivered March 1958. Transferred to Elenmaris Corp. Piraeus as Eleni M
Llanwern	1928	4,966	400x53x26	Built by Bartram, Sunderland (launched 1 September 1928); Maiden voyage to Cardiff-Santos (coal) – Rosario – Buenos Aires – Avonmouth (grain and wheat). Master G Clark, Plymouth. 26 February 1941 – sunk by air attack west of Ireland in position 54°57′N 17°6′W.
Llanwern	1937	4,993	420x56x28	Built as Nailsea Moor for Nailsea S.S. Co. by Bartram of Sunderland; 11 June 1949 – Bought and renamed Llanwern; 21 September 1957 – Sold to Inui Kisen Kabushlui of Kobe, Japan as Kenkon Maru; 1961 – resold as Fujisan Maru (to become fish factory)
Llanwern	1962	9,229	498x61'11"x26'11.25"	Llanwern 1962 Built by Bartram, Sunderland (launched 19 July 1962); Renamed Captain Michael later Agios Penteleimon.
Manchester	1890	2,072	285x37.2x20	Built by William Gray & Co., West Hartlepool. February 1912 – sold to Artaza & Co., Bilbao – Arcotis later L. C. Stensland; Hitteroy Browton and lastly as the Russian Voikov.
Maria N. Roussos	1909	3,129	346x50x23	Built by William Gray of Hartlepool; Chartered from 28 July 1925 to 21 November 1929
Mary Thomas	1889	2,159	275.5x37.8x20.1	Built by Palmers Shipbuilding and Iron Co of Jarrow; May 1908 – sold to the Glanhowny Steamship Company (H. A. Bartlett) as Barto; October 1909 – sold to Samuel Rowe as Jane Rowe
Novasli	1920	3,204	342.2x48x21.9	Built by R. Thompson & Sons, Sunderland; Norwegian vessel owned by A. Skibs; Chartered from the MoWT 1941–46; Sunk by German submarine U-1302 on 2 March 1945 at position 52°4′N 5°42′W
Paddington	1898	3,903	350x46.6x27.3	Built by Ropner & Sons, Stockton-on-Tees; Name changed to Iolo March 1913; 11 October 1916 – sunk by submarine U-46 153 nautical miles (283 km) north of Vardø, off north coast of Norway
Paddington	1906	5,084	392x50x30	Built by Richardson, Duck & Co, Thornaby-on-Tees. Renamed Swindon 1913; Renamed Paddington 1917; 21 July 1917 – torpedoed and sunk by submarine U-96 250 nautical miles (460 km) west of Fastnet.
Patagonia	1913	6,011	430x55.28x28.8	Built by Craig Taylor & Co., Stockton-on-Tees (Yard No. 154); Torpedoed 15 September 1915 by UB-7 10.5 nautical miles (19.4 km) northeast of Odessa.
Penistone	1913	4,139	370x40x25.9	Built by Craig Taylor & Co. Ltd. Stockton-on-Tees; 11 August 1918 – torpedoed and sunk by U-156 145 nautical miles (269 km) southwest by south of Nantucket.
Peterston	1892	2,768	321x40x21	Built by Thomas Turnbull, Whitehall Dockyard, Whitby. Daniel Radcliffe received his early training with the Turnbull Brothers who were also shipowners in Cardiff where he was for some time a clerk. Evan Thomas Radcliffe in the early days of the company had their offices at Philip and Lewis Turnbull's premises. 1913 – sold to Artaza & Co., Bilbao named Arpillao
Peterston	1925	4,680	385.45x52x26	Peterston 1925 Built by Bartram & Co., South Dock, Sunderland at a cost of £84,647; Delivered 23 February 1925; 1948 – sold to Gowan shipping Co. as Burhaven; 1950 – sold A. G. Tsauliris as Andrew T 1953 – sold Shamrock Shipping Co. as Raloo; 1957 – sold to Costa Rica as Paraporti; 27 July 1959 – scrapped at Antwerp.
Picton	1906	5,084	392x52x30	Built by Richardson, Duck & Co, Thornaby-on-Tees. Cost £48,939; 23 May 1927 – sold to Williams & Mordey Ltd., Cardiff for £24,132 as Seven Seas Transport; 1927 – sold to German owners W. Kunstmann – named Heinz W Kunstmann; 1937 – renamed Herta Engelin Fritzen (same owners); 25 October 1941 – Under a German flag she ran aground and was lost near the Nieuwe Waterweg, Hook of Holland.
PLM 17 (Managed Vessel)	1922	4,008	345x45x27	Built Smiths Dock, Middlesbrough for French owners.
Possidon	1909	3,744	346.3x50.8x23.1	Built by W. Gray & Co. Ltd., West Hartlepool for Greek owners. Chartered 1921–1933
Radcliffe Trader	1956	622		Radcliffe Trader and Radcliffe Venturer ex Silloth Trader (1980), ex Rosemary D. (1974), ex Valerie B (1973), ex Sarsfield (1970), ex Edgefield (1965), ex Spolesto (1956); Built by Noord Nederlandse Scheepswerven N.V., Groningen; Bought by ETR from Gillie & Blair Ltd. (Stag Line).
Radcliffe Venturer	1964	504		ex Bea (1980), ex Hattstedt (1974), ex Henriette (1972), ex Tilly (1969); Built by NV Bodewes Schps., Martenshoek, Netherlands; Bought from Baltic Schooner Association, Cayman Islands June 1980.
Samskern (Managed Vessel)	1944	7,210	423x59x34.8	Built by Bethlehem Fairfield Shipyard, Baltimore.
Sarah Radcliffe	1889	1,440	272x32.10x21'11"	Built by Ropner, Stockton-on-Tees; April 1910 – renamed Iolo; May 1914 – Sold to Constantine Hadjipateras of Greece as Archimedes; renamed Olteria then sold to Romania as Latium; 1930 – sold to D. B. Georgiades, Piraeus as Margarita; 3 June 1952 – Broken up.
Senta	1919	3,785	340x48.2x26	Built by Union Ironworks, Alameda, California USA; Norwegian vessel owned by Skibs A Chartered from the MoWT 1941–45
Stolt Llandaff	1971	15,585	560'1"x79'2"x34'6.7"	Tanker built by NV Boelwerf SA, Tamise, for Anthony Radcliffe S.S. Co. Ltd. The company was taken over by the Stolt Corporation and leased back to ETR until December 1981.
Swindon	1899	3,847	351x48x28.4	Built by Richardson, Duck & Co, Thornaby-on-Tees; Named Badminton 1912; 23 July 1916 – sunk by submarine gunfire from U-39 63 nautical miles (117 km) northeast by north of Cape Carbon, Algeria
Swindon	1917	4,240	390x53.3x23.5	Built by W. Pickersgill & Sons, Sunderland; 1917 – sold to Johnston Line as Cottesmore; 1920 – sold to D.&T.C. Adams as Avonmede; 1924 – sold to J.&.C. Harrison as Harpalion; 1931 – sold to N.G. Livanos, Chios as Theofano; 1937 – sold to V.J. Pateras, Chios as Dirphys; 8 June 1941 – torpedoed by submarine U-108 northeast of St. Johns, Newfoundland
Torvanger	1920	6,568	420.1x54.0x34.4	Built W. Doxford, Sunderland; Owned by Westfal-hausen & Co. Norway; Chartered from the MoWT 1942
Varangberg	1915	2,842	282.8x43.6x25.2	Built by Great Lakes Eng. Works, Ashtabula, Oregon, USA; Norwegian vessel owned by A/S Malmfart; Chartered from the MoWT 1941–46
Vera Radcliffe	1925	5,587	415x55.5x36.3	Vera Radcliffe 1925 Built by Craig, Taylor & Co., Stockton-on-Tees. Delivered 6 January 1925 for £99,393; June 1944 – sold to government for £75,000. Sunk as blockship on Normandy beaches.
Walter Thomas	1884	2,213	296x37.4x24.5	Named after Captain Evan Thomas's only son Walter Hezekiah Thomas. Built by Palmers Shipbuilding and Iron Co of Jarrow; Sunk 12 July 1901 after collision with Romney off Europa Point, Straits of Gibraltar on a voyage from Penarth to Derindje.
Washington	1907	5,079	378x52x30	Built by Richardson, Duck & Co, Thornaby-on-Tees. Cost £52,392; 3 May 1917 – torpedoed and sunk off Genoa (Rapallo Bay) by submarine U-63 while on time charter to Italian State Railways.
Wimborne	1898	3,466	339x46x27.3	Built by Richardson, Duck & Co, Thornaby-on-Tees for £35,556; On 7 November 1910 she was lost at Tolpedu off Polperro, Cornwall, while on voyage in ballast from Rotterdam to Barry. There were no casualties.
Wimborne	1911	6,078	415x55x28.8	Built by Craig, Taylor & Co., Stockton-on-Tees. Cost £54,011; 1936 – sold Halcyon Lign, Rotterdam, named Stad Schiedam for £16,006; 16 September 1940 – sunk after explosion, believed sabotage 37°0′N 64°0′W on voyage from Bermuda to Halifax, Nova Scotia.
Windsor	1897	4,074	370x46.6x27.3	Built by Ropner & Son, Stockton-on-Tees. Delivered 21 July 1897 27 November 1911 – name changed to Jane Radcliffe Torpedoed and sunk by submarine U-74 2 nautical miles (3.7 km) southwest of Antimilo, Greek Archipelago, 28 November 1917.
Windsor	1911	6,055	430x55.6x28.7	Built by Craig, Taylor & Co., Stockton-on-Tees. Delivered December 1911 (Yard No. 148); Sunk by gunfire from submarine U-38 70 nautical miles (130 km) southwest of The Lizard, 21 August 1915.
W. I. Radcliffe	1886	2,076	280x35x20	W I Radcliffe 1896 Built by Palmers Co., Jarrow. Sold in 1903 to the Aberporth S.S. Co. (Dan Jenkins) renamed Aberporth; The Jenkins Bros. were well known Cardiff shipowners with a substantial fleet. One member of the family, Daniel (Bryntirion, Aberporth) broke away from the family group to establish the Aberporth S.S. Co. It was a failure and the firm was soon bankrupt and the ship wrecked.
W. I. Radcliffe	1904	4,748	383x50.9x30.3	Built by Richardson, Duck & Co, Thornaby-on-Tees (Wyndham Ivor Radcliffe was Henry Radcliffe's son); Renamed Llancarvan – 13 March 1917; Torpedoed and sunk by submarine U-62 370 nautical miles (690 km) east by north from São Miguel, Azores at 38°24′N 17°18′W on 16 May 1918.
W. I. Radcliffe	1917	6,042	430x55.6x28.7	W I Radcliffe 1913 Built 1913 as Clarissa Radcliffe by Craig, Taylor & Co., Stockton-on-Tees, delivered April 1913 (Yard No. 155); 1917 – renamed W. I. Radcliffe; 12 March 1918 – torpedoed by submarine U-71 in English Channel, but made port. 18 April 1935 – sold to N. Eusthattion & Co., Piraeus, named Marietta; 1939 – sold to Leonhardt & Blumsey – Karl Leonhardt; 16 March 1946 – Scuttled with ammunition in Skaggerak.
Wynnstay	1884	1,541	209x36.4x18	Built by Palmers Shipbuilding & Iron Co of Jarrow; Sold in June 1902 for £9,500 to L. Overgaard, Norway – Nora.

== Notable captains ==
- Capt. J. Alexander of Cardiff
- Capt. W. R. Burgess of Cardiff
- Capt. G. Clark of Plymouth
- Capt. D. J. Davies of Aberarth
- Capt. J. Davies of Aberporth
- Capt. J. A. Davies of Cardigan
- Capt. E. H. Dolton of Brixham
- Capt. J. James of Aberporth
- Capt. J. R. Jenkins of Aberporth
- Capt. E. Jones of Llanarth
- Capt. J. Jones of Aberarth
- Capt. John Jones of Rhoshirwaun
- Capt. J. W. Jones of St Dogmaels
- Capt. T. Jones of Blaenporth
- Capt. M. Mathias of Cardigan
- Capt. S. H. Mathias of Newport, Pembrokeshire
- Capt. B. T. Morris – Marine Superintendent for Evan Thomas Radcliffe
- Capt. J. E. Owen of Swansea
- Capt. T. Owens of Llangrannog
- Capt. R. Rees of St Dogmaels
- Capt. R. Roberts of Holyhead
- Capt. D. Smith of Lewis
- Capt. J. Thomas of Cardiff
- Capt. J. E. Thomas of Newcastle Emlyn
- Capt. W. Thomas of Llaniestyn
- Capt. D. Williams of Machynlleth
- Capt. John Williams of Cardiff
- Capt. T. Wood of Cardiff

The Evan Thomas Radcliffe brand was sold to the Evan Reid Group of Cardiff.

== Bibliography ==
- Jenkins, David, Cardiff tramps, Cardi crews, Journal of the Cardiganshire Antiquarian Society, Vol. 10, nos. 1–4 – 1984–1987, ISSN 0069-2263
- Jenkins, J. Geraint, Evan Thomas Radcliffe : a Cardiff Shipowning Company, National Museum of Wales, Cardiff, 1982, ISBN 978-0-7200-0247-8
