= SS Llanashe =

UK cargo steamship sunk during World War II

Coordinates: 34°00′S 28°30′E

History

United Kingdom
- Name: Llanashe
- Owner: Clarissa Radcliffe SS Co Ltd
- Operator: Evan Thomas, Radcliffe & Co
- Port of registry: London
- Builder: Bartram & Sons, Sunderland
- Yard number: 273
- Launched: 30 September 1936
- Completed: November 1936
- Identification: UK official number 165338; call sign GZGB
- Fate: Sunk by torpedo, 17 February 1943

General characteristics
- Type: Cargo ship
- Tonnage: 4,836 GRT 2,911 NRT
- Length: 417.8 ft (127.3 m)
- Beam: 56.6 ft (17.3 m)
- Draught: 26 ft (7.9 m)
- Depth: 25.1 ft (7.7 m)
- Decks: 1
- Installed power: 348 NHP
- Propulsion: 4-cylinder compound engine plus exhaust steam turbine
- Speed: 10 knots (19 km/h)
- Crew: 36 plus 6 DEMS gunners
- Sensors & processing systems: wireless direction finding; echo sounding device
- Notes: sister ship: Llandaff

SS Llanashe was a UK cargo steamship. She was launched in 1936 in Sunderland, England, and sunk by a U-boat in the Indian Ocean in February 1943.

== Building ==
In 1936–37 Bartram & Sons built a pair of sister ships for Evan Thomas, Radcliffe and Company of Cardiff. Llanashe was launched on 30 September 1936 and completed that November. Llandaff was launched on 17 March 1937 and completed that May.

Unusually for steamships built in the 1930s Llanashe and Llandaff each had a compound engine. Triple-expansion engines had largely superseded compound engines in the 1860s. But in Llanashe and Llandaff the compound engine was combined with an exhaust steam turbine to achieve a third stage of steam expansion and hence economy in bunkering.

The compound engine had two high- and two low-pressure cylinders and drove the propeller shaft by single-reduction gearing. Exhaust steam from its two low-pressure cylinders powered a single exhaust steam turbine, which drove the same propeller shaft via double-reduction gearing. The compound engine was made by White's Marine Engineering Company of Hebburn. The compound engine plus exhaust turbine gave Llanashe a speed of 10 knots (19 km/h).

== War service ==
Llanashe seems to have sailed unescorted until May 1940, when, laden with a cargo of sugar, she joined Convoy HG 29F from Gibraltar to Liverpool.

From August 1940 until October 1941 Llanashe sailed in five convoys from Canada to Britain. Four were HX convoys from Halifax, Nova Scotia to Liverpool: HX 67 and HX 89 in 1940 and HX 118 and HX 134 in 1941. The fifth was Convoy SC 47 from Sydney, Nova Scotia to Liverpool in September and October 1941. Each time her cargo included steel for the Allied war effort.

In November 1941 Llanashe left Liverpool for Cape Town in South Africa, sailing in Convoy OS 12 as far as Freetown in Sierra Leone. She returned in March 1942 with a convoy of iron ore, joining Convoy SL 102 at Freetown which brought her to Liverpool.

In June 1942 Llanashe brought another cargo of sugar to Britain. She came via Convoy HS 10 along the Nova Scotia coast from Halifax to Sydney and then Convoy SC 87 from Sydney to Liverpool.

In summer 1942 Llanashe sailed from Liverpool to the Caribbean via convoys ON 112 to Cape Cod, NG 300 from New York City to Guantánamo in Cuba and GAT 2 to Trinidad. Thereafter she seems to have sailed unescorted.

=== Loss ===
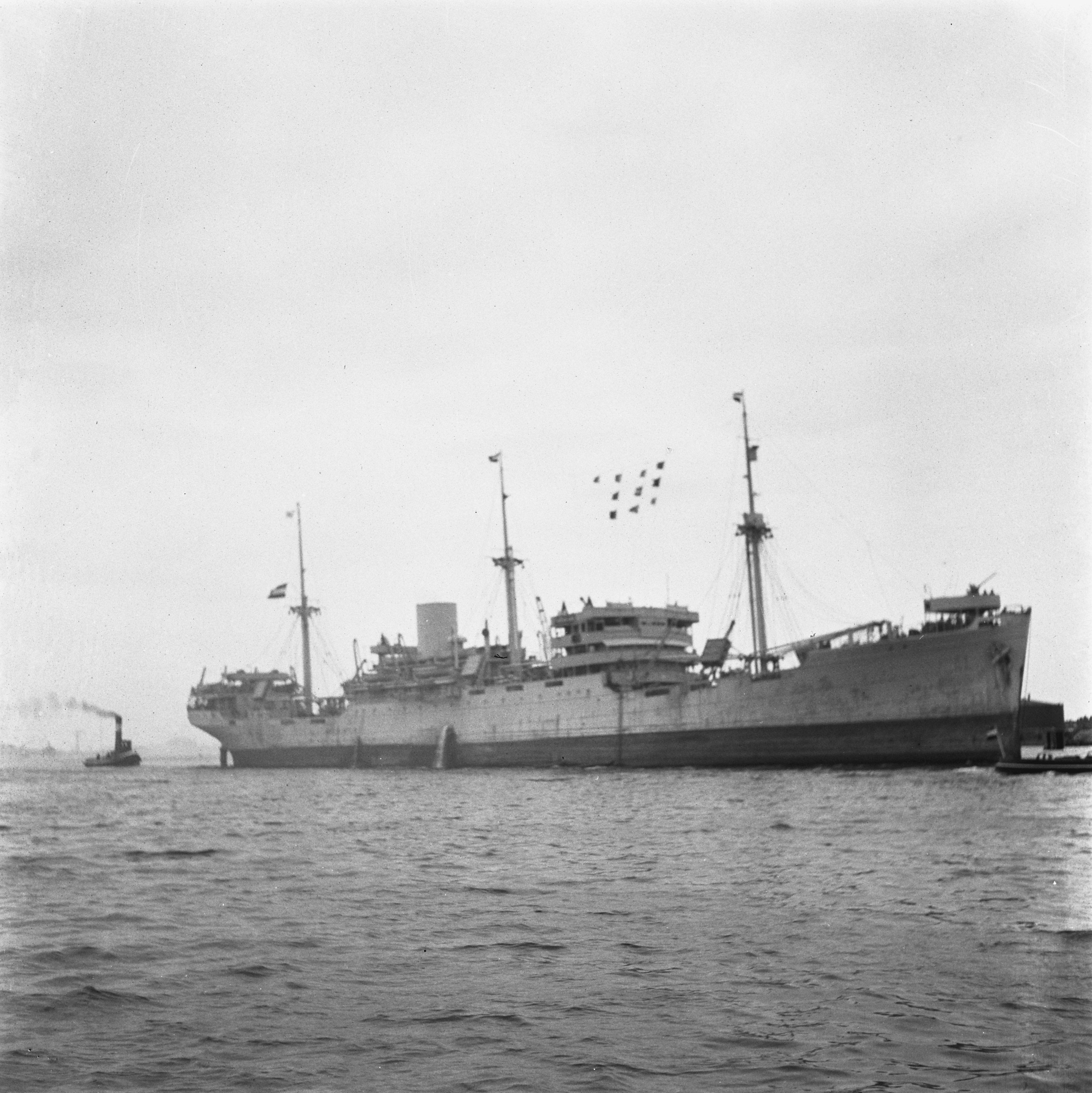
The Dutch motor ship Tarakan rescued the survivors from Llanashe

In January 1943 Llanashe sailed from Basra in Iraq via Bandar Abbas in Iran destined for Port Elizabeth and Cape Town in South Africa. She was carrying 3,500 tons of tin plate and aluminium. Before she reached Port Elizabeth the German submarine U-182 torpedoed her on 17 February in the Indian Ocean south of Cape St. Francis.

Llanashe's crew managed to launch only one of her lifeboats, but several life-rafts floated clear. The Chief Officer, Samuel Lloyd, was in the water for an hour before he managed to board a raft. He took command and at daybreak gathered three other rafts and got all four tied together. The four rafts carried a total of 16 men.

The Third Officer, Gwynfor Fowler, was in the water clinging to wreckage for about 13 hours before he reached another of Llanashe's rafts. Two and a half days later the only lifeboat to have been launched found the raft, and Fowler took command of the lifeboat.

11 days after the sinking a Netherland Line cargo motor ship, Tarakan, found Lloyd's life-rafts and Fowler's lifeboat. But by then Lloyd's raft had capsized four times and there were only two survivors. In total Tarakan found only Lloyd, Fowler, six crewmen and one DEMS gunner alive. Llanashe's Master, James Parry, 27 of his crew and five gunners had been lost in either the sinking or the subsequent 11 days awaiting rescue. Tarakan transferred the nine survivors to the armed merchant cruiser HMS Carthage and destroyer HMS Racehorse, which landed them at Cape Town on 4 March.

In November 1943 Chief Officer Lloyd and Third Officer Fowler were awarded the MBE. Their citations state that Lloyd "showed great courage and fortitude" and Fowler "displayed skill, excellent seamanship and great endurance".
