= White's Marine Engineering Company =

Defunct British maker of marine steam engines

White's Marine Engineering Company was a British marine engineering company in Hebburn on Tyneside, that made marine steam engines in the 1930s.

== William Albert White ==
The founder, William Albert White (1879–1940), was a marine chief engineer from Sunderland who had served at sea. In 1904 he worked for the Parsons Marine Steam Turbine Company, installing and running steam turbines in destroyers. He then worked in the United States on the building and installation of marine steam turbines. From 1910 he had his own marine repair business in New York. In 1916 he disposed of his New York business and returned to England.

In 1921 White patented a low-pressure system for burning heavy fuel oil, which had become an economical and popular alternative to coal for bunkering steamships. He founded White's Oil Burning Co to manufacture the system in either 1920 or 1922. In 1921 RMS Berengaria was converted to oil-burning with his system. He also invented a pulverizer for coal.

== White combination machinery ==
In 1926 two German engineers, Dr Gustav Bauer and Hans Wach, had increased the efficiency of a triple expansion engine by adding a turbine driven by exhaust steam from the low-pressure cylinder, and adding the power from the turbine to the same propeller shaft via a fluid coupling and double-reduction gearing. This increased both fuel efficiency and power, and gave ship operators the option of either more speed or greater economy. By 1928, British ships such as Boniface were also being built with Bauer-Wach machinery.

In 1908 the Parsons company had introduced reduction gearing for steam turbines, as demonstrated in the cargo ship Vespasian. This improved turbine ships' fuel economy. But all reciprocating engines continued to be built with direct drive to the propeller, and therefore ran at the same slow speed as the propeller. In the 1930s White pioneered the application of reduction gearing to reciprocating engines, in order to reduce fuel consumption.

White founded White's Marine Engineering Co, with a factory at Hebburn, and absorbed White's Oil Burning Co into his new company. In 1934 he bought from Lamport and Holt the cargo ship Boswell, created the White Shipping Co Ltd to own her, and renamed her Adderstone.

Boswell's original engines were two turbines mounted side-by-side, either side of the centre-line of the ship, and geared onto a single propeller shaft. White replaced her high-pressure turbine with compound engine that had four cylinders: two high-pressure and two low-pressure. Steam from the boilers passed through a superheater and reheater before entering the high-pressure cylinders. Steam exhausted from the high-pressure cylinders passed through the reheater again before entering the low-pressure cylinders. Hence steam on its way to the high-pressure cylinders re-heated steam on its way to the low-pressure cylinders.

The reciprocating engine drove the propeller shaft via single reduction gearing, which allowed the engine to run several times faster than the propeller. This meant that the reciprocating engine could be much smaller and lighter than in the Bauer-Wach system.

As in the Bauer-Wach system, exhaust steam from White's reciprocating engine powered an exhaust steam turbine which drove the same propeller shaft via double reduction gearing. But because the reciprocating engine had only two stages of expansion, the steam was at higher pressure, and allowed White to use a turbine more powerful than in the Bauer-Wach system. White's system produced about half of its power from the reciprocating engine, and half from the turbine.

In 1935, White built a smaller propulsion system on the same principles. Its compound engine had two cylinders instead of four, but was otherwise similar to that installed in Adderstone. It was installed in a new fishing trawler that was built in Aberdeen, and which was named White Pioneer. White created Whites Trawlers, Ltd to own her.

Adderstone and White Pioneer were successful proofs of concept, and White applied for patents for his propulsion system. In the United States he filed for a patent in January 1936, and the United States Patent Office awarded him US patent number 2,137,934 in November 1938.

Between 1936 and 1938, three shipbuilders in White's native Sunderland installed his propulsion system in new steamships. Bartram & Sons installed it in seven ships and J.L. Thompson and Sons installed it in five. Short Brothers installed it in one ship, Biddlestone, that White ordered for his own White Shipping Co.

White claimed that his system used 35 percent less fuel than a triple expansion engine of similar power. It was suitable for installation in new ships, but it was not easy to install retrospectively in existing reciprocating-engined ships. The Bauer-Wach system remained more popular because it could be added to an existing triple-expansion engine.

== Later history ==
White died on 9 June 1940. Evan Thomas, Radcliffe and Company bought Biddlestone. White had already sold Adderstone in 1937. White's Marine Engineering Co Ltd was listed in 1951 as a supplier to the British glass industry.

== Bibliography ==
- Hardy, AC (1954) [1948]. Modern Marine Engineering. Vol. I (revised ed.). London: Caxton Publishing.
