= SS Marialaura =

History
- Name: Empire Eddystone (1945–47); Winston Churchill (1947–52); Marialaura (1952–66)
- Owner: Ministry of War Transport (1945); Ministry of Transport (1945–47); Aegean Shipping Co Ltd (1947–52); Fratelli D'Amico (1952–66)
- Operator: Evan T.Radcliffe & Co (1945–47); S G Embiricos Ltd (1947–52); Fratelli D'Amico (1952–66)
- Port of registry: (United Kingdom) West Hartlepool, UK (1945–47); (United Kingdom) Cardiff (1947–52); Rome, Italy (1952–66)
- Builder: William Gray & Co Ltd
- Yard number: 1176
- Launched: 11 May 1945
- Completed: July 1945
- Out of service: May 1966
- Identification: -United Kingdom Official Number 0084 (1945–52); Code Letters GKMC (1945–52)
- Fate: Scrapped

General characteristics
- Type: Cargo ship
- Tonnage: 7,318 GRT
- Length: 431 ft (131 m)
- Beam: 56 ft (17 m)
- Propulsion: Steam engine

Marialaura was a 7,318 GRT cargo ship that was built in 1945 as Empire Eddystone by William Gray & Co Ltd, West Hartlepool, Co Durham, United Kingdom for the Ministry of War Transport (MoWT). In 1947, she was sold into merchant service and renamed Winston Churchill. A sale to an Italian owner in 1952 saw her renamed Marialaura, serving until she was scrapped in 1966.

== Description ==
The ship was built in 1945 by William Gray & Co Ltd, West Hartlepool. She was yard number 1176.

The ship was 431 feet (131 m) long, with a beam of 56 feet (17 m). She was assessed at 7,318 GRT.

The ship was propelled by a triple expansion steam engine.

== History ==
Empire Eddystone was launched on 8 December 1943 and completed in May 1944. She was placed under the management of E T Radcliff & Co Ltd, Cardiff, Glamorgan. She was allocated the United Kingdom Official Number 180084, and Code Letters GKMC. Her port of registry was West Hartlepool.

In 1947, Empire Eddystone was sold to Aegean Shipping Co Ltd and renamed Winston Churchill. She was placed under the management of S G Embiricos Ltd, London.

In 1952, Winston Churchill was sold to Fratelli D'Amico, Rome, Italy and renamed Marialaura. She served until May 1966, when she was scrapped at Trieste.
