= Parsons Marine Steam Turbine Company =

Engineering company in the United Kingdom

- Type: Public
- Industry: Engineering
- Founded: 1893
- Fate: Acquired
- Successor: C. A. Parsons and Company
- Headquarters: Newcastle upon Tyne, UK
- Key people: Charles Algernon Parsons, Rachel Parsons

Parsons Marine Steam Turbine Company was a British engineering company based on the River Tyne at Wallsend, North East England.

== History ==
Charles Algernon Parsons founded the company in 1893 with £500,000 of capital. It specialised in the development and production of the steam turbine engines that Parsons had invented for marine use. The first vessel powered by a Parsons turbine was Turbinia, launched in 1894. The successful and unannounced demonstration of this vessel at the Navy Review for Queen Victoria's Diamond Jubilee at Spithead on 26 June 1897, during which Turbina proved to be considerably faster than any other ship present, significant attention was drawn to the company and the steam turbine alike.

In March 1898, the company set about the construction of engines for the first two turbine-powered destroyers for the Royal Navy, HMS Viper and HMS Cobra, both of which were launched in 1899. Although both vessels were short-lived, the new engines were not to blame, and the Admiralty was convinced of the technology's valued. Parsons' son became a director in the company and was replaced during the First World War by his daughter Rachel Parsons.

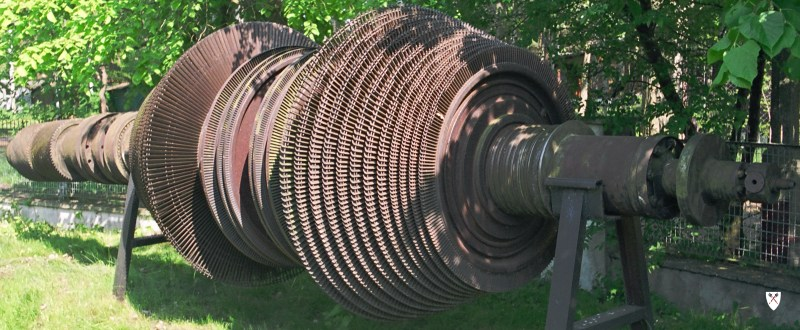
The rotating blade assembly of a Parsons marine turbine.

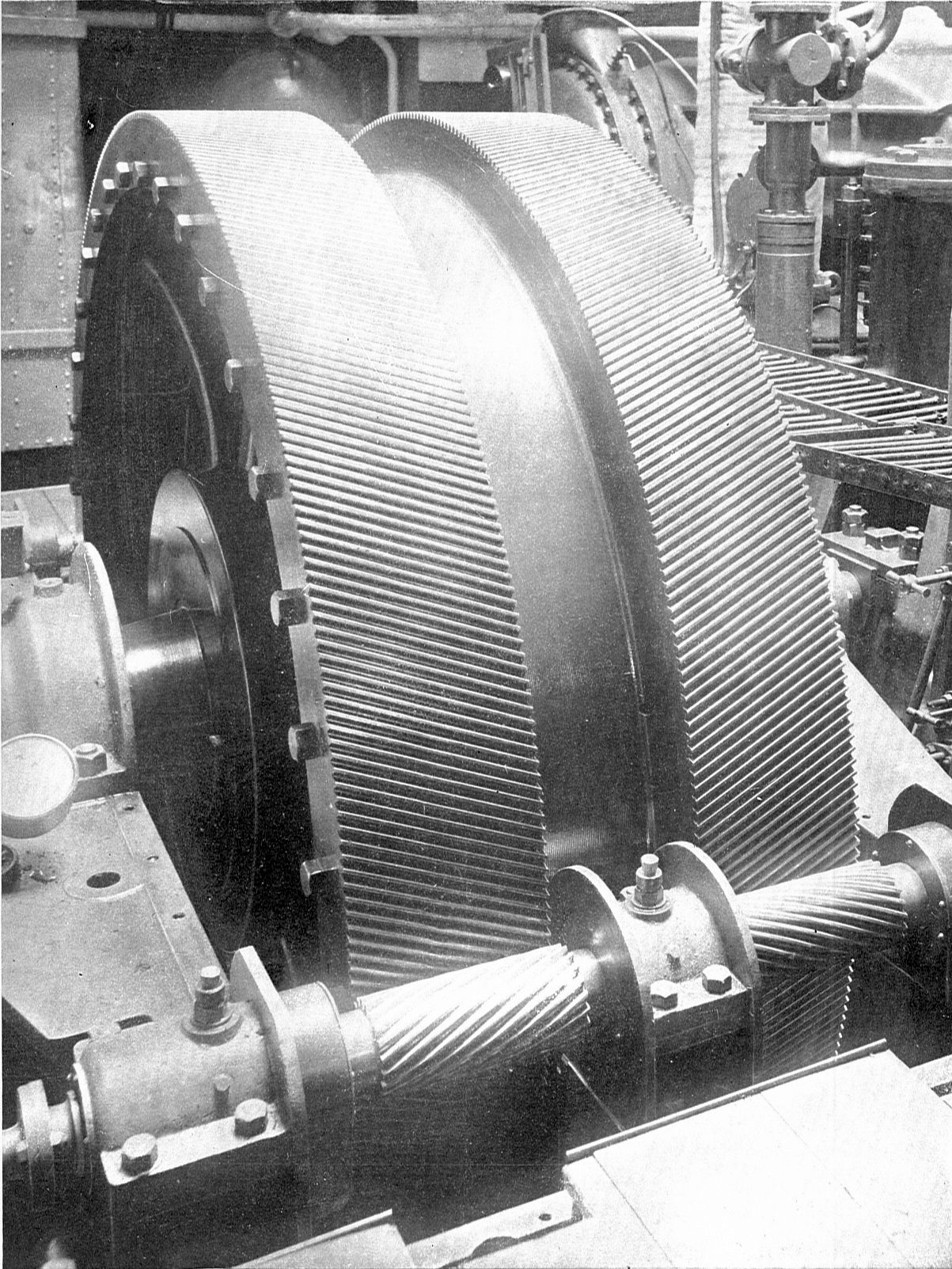
Turbine reduction gearing of Vespasian, 1908.

The performance of the Parsons turbines in smaller ships convinced the Admiralty to used them for the world's first turbine powered battleship, HMS Dreadnought, launched in October 1906. Dreadnought was quickly followed by other capital ships, such as the Invincible-class battlecruisers, that also were powered by Parsons propulsion systems. The Royal Navy, Royal Canadian Navy and Royal Australian Navy used Parsons turbines on their Tribal-class destroyers.

Civilian ships also quickly made use of the steam turbine, leading to the world's first turbine ocean liners, RMS Victorian and Virginian. Furthermore, 73,000 horsepower (54,000 kW) Parsons turbines powered the 31,000 GRT Cunard express ocean liners RMS Mauretania and RMS Lusitania.

All early marine turbines drove their propellers directly. Parsons developed helical reduction gearing for marine turbines, and in 1908 converted the cargo ship Vespasian to turbine propulsion with reduction gearing. Furthermore, four direct-drive Parsons turbines powered the United States Navy battleship USS Arizona. While they were designed to produce a total of 34,000 horsepower (25,000 kW), but achieved only 33,376 horsepower (24,888 kW) in Arizona's sea trials, when she met her designed speed of 21 knots (39 km/h).

During the interwar period, numerous British shipbuilders and marine engine manufacturers opted to collaborate with Parsons, which remained Britain's sole indigenous designer and manufacturer of large marine steam turbines by the start of the Second World War. While there were various companies active in the UK's marine steam turbine engineering sector, the majority of these were licensees of Parsons.

In 1944, in response to British government encouragement and fears within the Admiralty that the UK could fall behind overseas developments, Parsons was one of 19 companies that came together to form the Parsons Marine Turbine Research and Development Association (PAMETRADA).

The last ocean liner of the 20th century, Cunard's Queen Elizabeth 2, launched in 1969, was initially fitted with Parsons-built steam turbines.

During 1956, the company was acquired by Richardsons Westgarth & Company. It was subsequently absorbed into C. A. Parsons and Company and, later, Siemens Energy, a German energy industrial conglomerate.

== See also ==
- C. A. Parsons and Company
