= SS Picton =

History

United Kingdom
- Name: SS Picton
- Namesake: Sir Thomas Picton
- Owner: Picton Steam Ship Co., Ltd.
- Builder: Richardson, Duck & Co., Stockton-on-Tees
- Yard number: 574
- Launched: 9 July 1906
- Completed: 1906
- Maiden voyage: 1906
- In service: 1906
- Out of service: 1927
- Identification: Signal Letters: HGTD
- Fate: Sold

United Kingdom
- Name: SS Seven Seas Transport
- Operator: Williams & Mordey Ltd., Cardiff
- Acquired: 1927
- Fate: Sold

Germany
- Name: SS Heinz W. Kunstmann
- Owner: Reederei and Wilhelm Kunstmann, Stettin
- Acquired: 1929
- Fate: Sold

Germany
- Name: SS Hertha Engeline Fritzen
- Owner: Fritzen Johs. & Sohn, Emden
- Acquired: 1938
- Out of service: 1941
- Fate: Ran aground at Europoort on 26 October 1941

General characteristics
- Tonnage: 5,083 GRT (4,706 GRT under deck); 3,241 NRT
- Length: 378.5 ft (115.4 m)
- Height: 52.1 ft (15.9 m)
- Propulsion: Steam, screw
- Speed: 10 knots (19 km/h; 12 mph)
- Crew: ~42

The SS Picton was a British steamship, chiefly known for its involvement in the events of the Halifax Explosion.

== History ==
At the time of the Halifax explosion, Picton was moored next to the sugar refinery wharf, having earlier run aground and damaged her stern post and rudder. Her cargo (food-stuffs and explosives) was being removed by a party of 80 longshoremen so that she might be safely repaired. They had gotten as far as her ballast, 1,500 tons of fused shells, when the blast happened. She was only a hundred feet away from the SS Mont-Blanc when the fire began. The superintendent foreman, Frank Carew, realised the danger and, along with his men, had the hatch covers closed and secured when the Mont-Blanc went up. Carew, his two assistants and 68 of the men were killed and stripped by the blast. A 1-ton boulder, presumably lifted from the harbour bottom by the blast, landed on the ship. Only ten of the crew survived, in varying conditions of hurt. A party of blue-jackets removed the survivors ashore.

As for the condition of the ship, the superstructure was wrecked and an apparatus for producing a smoke screen was wrecked and the cartridges scattered on deck. The cartridges contained a good proportion of phosphorus and produced a thick black smoke on ignition.

Capt. James W. Harrison, Marine Supt. of Furness Withy Co., recognised the danger of the ballast exploding, and made his way to the ship with help from his son, Lt Leslie Harrison. He commandeered the tug Weatherspoon and ordered its captain take him to the Picton.

The Picton was at that time seen to be giving off smoke and steam from the after part of the bridge. The force of the explosion had blown the hatch covers back open. The smoke was from burning debris from the wharf and adjacent sheds which, along with the sugar refinery, was ablaze. Harrison extinguished the fire.

He then set to work to cut the wire and manila cables, and the tug attached a line to the bow of the Picton. After an hour's work, he succeeded. Unable to raise the anchor, they enlisted two more tugs and dragged the Picton into the "stream" and secured her with another anchor, finishing at 4:00.

The gale during the blizzard on Friday pulled the vessel to and fro, endangering other ships which were also wandering.

On Saturday, the Admiralty instructed the Furness Withy people to remove Picton from the harbour and beach her in the Eastern Passage. Capt. Harrison supervised this being done. A patrol vessel was anchored nearby and a guard from the 63rd Halifax Rifles was stationed at Crow's Point to prevent thieves and the curious from stripping her. Some youths were later arrested for trying this.

It is possible that they stepped on some of the errant cartridges and caused the fire that was reported aboard the ship on Sunday morning. Upon seeing the flames, residents of nearby homes fled in the pouring rain. The guard swiftly boarded her and extinguished the flames in about 20 minutes. The Picton was once more towed out into the stream, bursting into flames as this was being done. After the fire was out, the guards went back on board to confirm that the ammunition was still on board, even extinguishing a small fire in the packing straw.

Nothing further happened until 29 January, when an ammunition box caught fire as it was being unloaded at the Ocean Terminals pier. The phosphorus that had leaked from the damaged cartridges had mixed with cordite, causing a box to ignite as it was being dragged across a bench. The small blaze was speedily extinguished, but caused panic in the nearby community. Schools and houses in the South End emptied. The panic did eventually die down, and the ship was forgotten.

== Final years ==
The ship was quietly sold off in 1927 to Williams & Mordey Ltd., Cardiff and her name changed to SS Seven Seas Transport. In 1929 the ship changed hands to Reederei and Wilhelm Kunstmann, Stettin, as SS Heinz W. Kunstmann. She was last sold in 1938 to Fritzen Johs. & Sohn, Emden, as SS Hertha Engeline Fritzen. She ran aground under that name on 26 October 1941, near the Nieuwe Waterweg entrance of Europoort.

== Notes ==
=== Sources ===
- Metson, Graham; MacMecham, Archibald (1978). "The Picton". The Halifax Explosion: December 6, 1917. McGraw-Hill Ryerson. pp. 26–29. ISBN 0070827982.
