= SS Vespasian =

Experimental ship driven by steam turbines with reduction gearing

History

United Kingdom
- Name: 1887: Eastern Prince; 1908: Vespasian
- Namesake: 1908: Vespasian
- Owner: 1887: Prince SS Co; 1899: Prince Line; 1908: Watson & Watson; 1908: Vespasian SS Co; 1913: Cairns & Noble
- Operator: 1887: James Knott; 1908: Parsons MST Co
- Port of registry: Newcastle upon Tyne
- Route: 1908: Newcastle – Rotterdam
- Builder: Short Brothers, Pallion
- Yard number: 172
- Launched: 17 September 1887
- Refit: overhauled & re-engined 1908
- Identification: UK official number 92869; code letters KPLB
- Fate: Scrapped 1914

General characteristics
- Type: Collier
- Tonnage: 1887: 2,147 GRT, 1,408 NRT; 1892: 2,147 GRT, 1,378 NRT
- Displacement: 4,350 tons
- Length: 292.6 ft (89.2 m)
- Beam: 39.0 ft (11.9 m)
- Depth: 18.9 ft (5.8 m)
- Installed power: 1887: triple-expansion engine; 228 NHP; 1908: steam turbines; 200 ihp
- Propulsion: 1 × screw
- Notes: turbines salvaged for Lord Byron

SS Vespasian was a steel-hulled cargo steamship that was built in Sunderland in 1887 as Eastern Prince, renamed Vespasian in 1908 and scrapped in Newcastle upon Tyne in 1914. In 1908 the Parsons Marine Steam Turbine Company converted her to steam turbine propulsion. She is notable as the first ship in the world whose turbines drove her propeller by reduction gearing instead of direct drive.

== Eastern Prince ==
Short Brothers of Sunderland built Eastern Prince in Pallion, Sunderland, launching her on 17 September 1887. Her registered length was 292.6 ft (89.2 m), her beam was 39.0 ft (11.9 m) and her depth was 18.9 ft (5.8 m). Her tonnages were 2,147 GRT and 1,408 NRT. She had a clipper bow and clipper stern, two masts and one funnel. As built, Eastern Prince had a three-cylinder triple-expansion steam engine built by George Clark of Southwick.

Eastern Prince was built for the Prince Steam Shipping Company, which was managed by James Knott of Newcastle. In 1892 her net register tonnage was revised to 1,378. In 1899 her ownership was transferred to Prince Line, under the same management. In 1908 Wilson and Wilson of Newcastle bought her, but in the same year sold her on to the Parsons Marine Steam Turbine Company.

== Marine turbine flexibility and efficiency ==
All of the earliest steam turbine ships, including Turbinia (1894), HMS Viper (1899), TS King Edward (1901), RMS Victorian (1904), RMS Carmania (1905) and RMS Lusitania (1906) had direct drive from their turbines to their propellers. This meant that their propellers ran at turbine speed, which was much faster than the speed of reciprocating marine steam engines.

Direct-drive turbine ships used more coal and water than steamships with reciprocating engines, and they were suitable only for services in which they could sustain speeds of 16 knots (30 km/h) or more. Early in the 20th century, all cargo ships, and most passenger ships, sailed at less than 16 knots (30 km/h). Parsons sought a way for turbines to propel slower ships efficiently.

In 1897, a 22-foot (6.7 m) steam launch was built with a single turbine driving twin propellers via helical reduction gearing. Her turbine ran at 20,000 rpm and the reduction gear ratio was 14 to 1. But it was not until 1908 that Parsons scaled up the concept to be applied to a ship.

== Vespasian ==
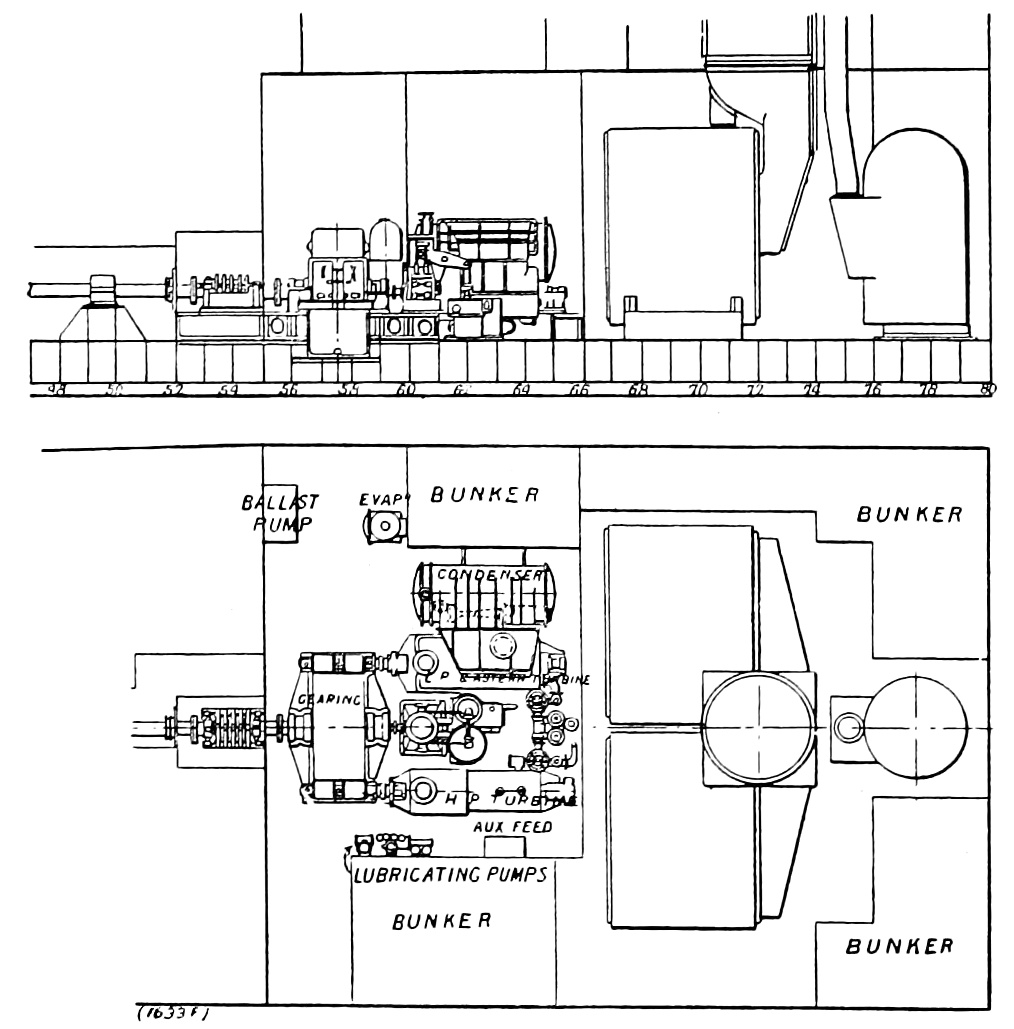
Vespansian's turbines; seen in longitudinal section; and from above

The Parsons company renamed the ship Vespasian, thoroughly overhauled her, and tested her triple-expansion engine for coal and water consumption. Parsons replaced the engine with twin steam turbines that drove her propeller shaft by reduction gearing. She kept the same boilers, propeller and propeller shaft.

Parsons found that the turbine used 15 percent less coal than the triple-expansion engine. Parsons then altered her propeller, which increased the fuel saving to 22 percent. The turbines also used less water than her triple-expansion engine. The turbines ran at 1,400 rpm, and drove her propeller shaft at 70 rpm via single-reduction gearing.

The Parsons company ran Vespasian as a collier, carrying coal from Newcastle to Rotterdam. By 1911, she had covered 20,000 nautical miles (37,000 km) in all weathers, and delivered 90,000 tons of coal.

== Fate ==
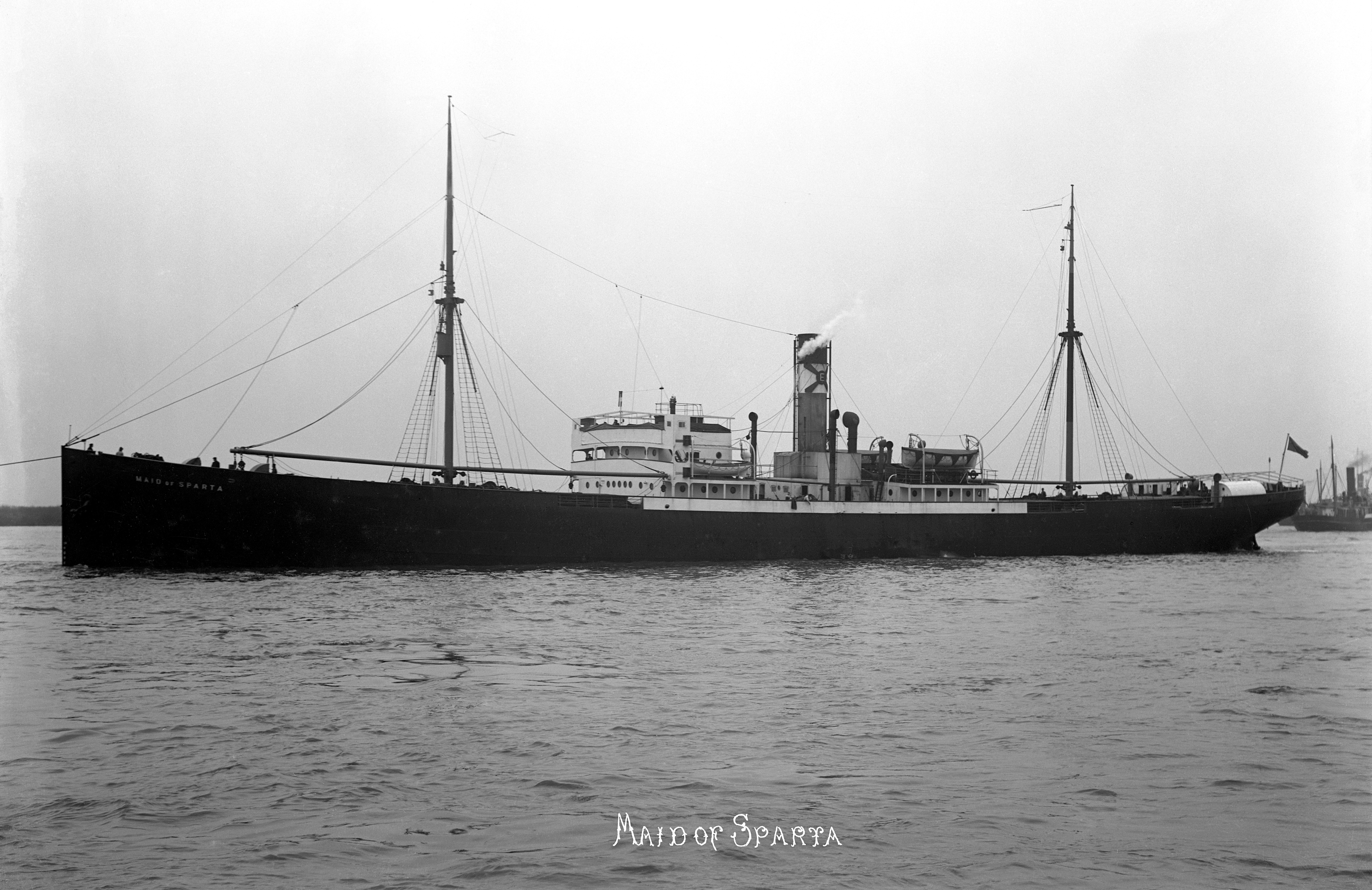
Maid of Sparta; the former Lord Byron

In 1913, Cairns & Noble bought Vespasian for her turbines. Vespasian was scrapped in Newcastle in the first half of 1914. William Doxford & Sons installed the turbines in the cargo ship Lord Byron, which was launched in 1916, and completed in 1917. In 1928, Lord Byron was renamed Maid of Sparta. The turbines survived until 1931, when the ship was re-engined with a triple-expansion engine, and renamed Nicolaos G. Culucundis.

== Bibliography ==
- Neal, William George, ed. (1 October 1887). "Launches and Trial Runs". The Marine Engineer. 9 (7). London: 251.
- Parsons, Charles A (1911). The Steam Turbine. The Rede Lecture. Cambridge: Cambridge University Press – via Wikisource.
- Parsons, Charles A (April 1910). "The Application of the Marine Steam Turbine and Mechanical Gearing to Merchant Ships". The Marine Engineer and Naval Architect. 32. London: The Marine Engineer: 340–344.
- Registrar General of Shipping and Seamen (1888). Mercantile Navy List. Board of Trade – via Crew List Index Project.
- Registrar General of Shipping and Seamen (1892). Mercantile Navy List. Board of Trade – via Crew List Index Project.
