= Port of Osaka =

Major Port in Western Japan

Coordinates: 34°38′31.0″N 135°25′22.0″E

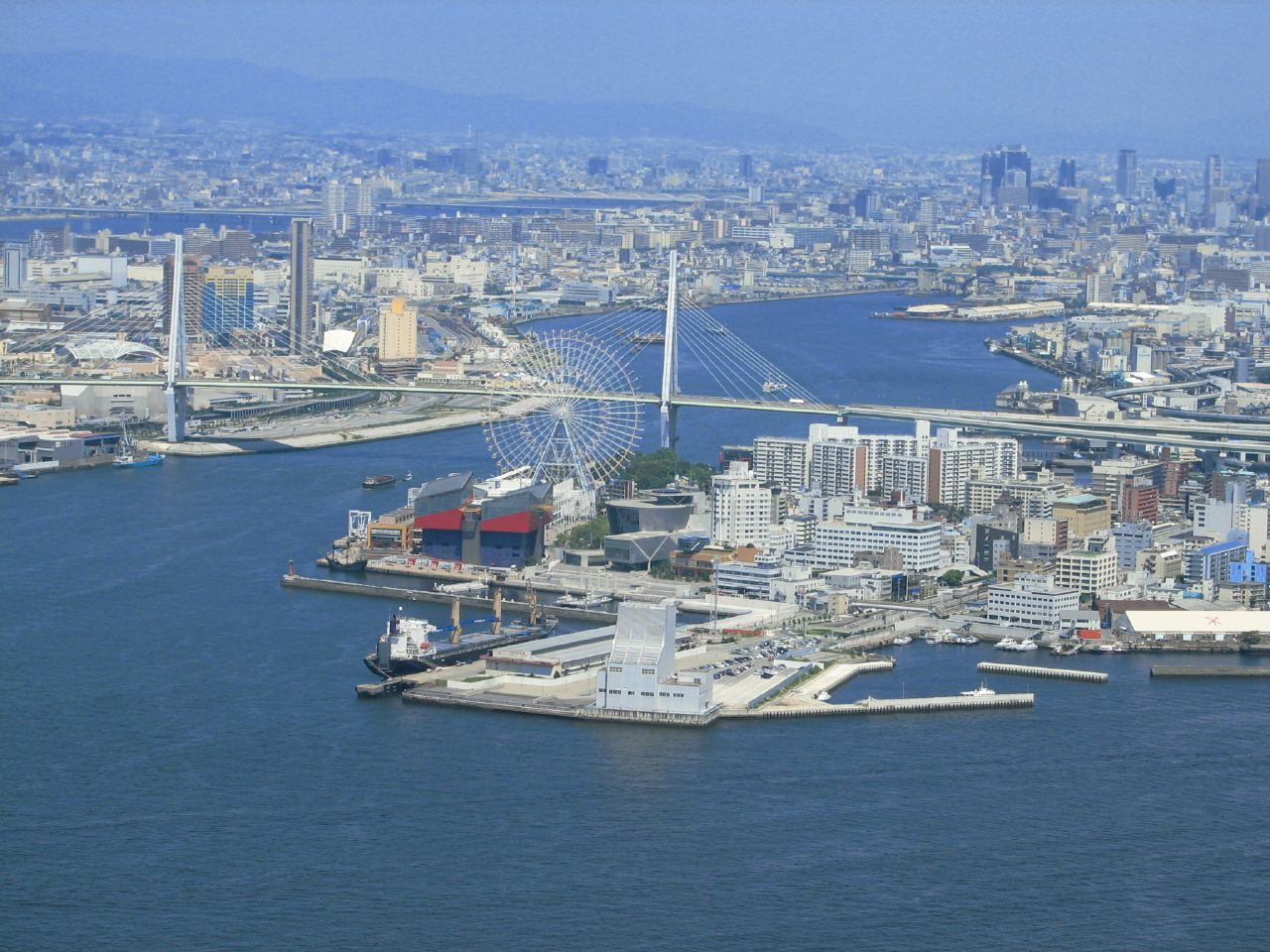
Port of Osaka

The Port of Osaka (大阪港, Ōsaka-kō) is the main port in Japan, located in Osaka within Osaka Bay. The Port of Osaka also has several sister ports including the Port of Busan.

== Harbor Statistics ==
- Cargo Handling Volume (2016)
  - Foreign trade: 34.11 million tons
  - Domestic trade: 48.09 million tons (including 31.29 million tons of ferries)
- Mooring facility (as of 2008)
  - Oceangoing: 70 berths
  - Coastal 111 berths
- Area (as of 2016)
  - Harbor area: 4,684 hectares
  - Landfill area: 1,860 hectares.
