= Archerfield Estate and Links =

Estate in Dirleton, East Lothian, Scotland

Coordinates: 56.055°N 2.801°W

The Archerfield estate is an estate in the parish of Dirleton, East Lothian, Scotland, now operated as a golfing resort. It includes a country house (Archerfield House) and two golf courses (Archerfield Links), as well as accommodation, a restaurant and a spa. An older golf course, also called Archerfield Links, occupied the area before falling into disuse after World War II.

== History ==
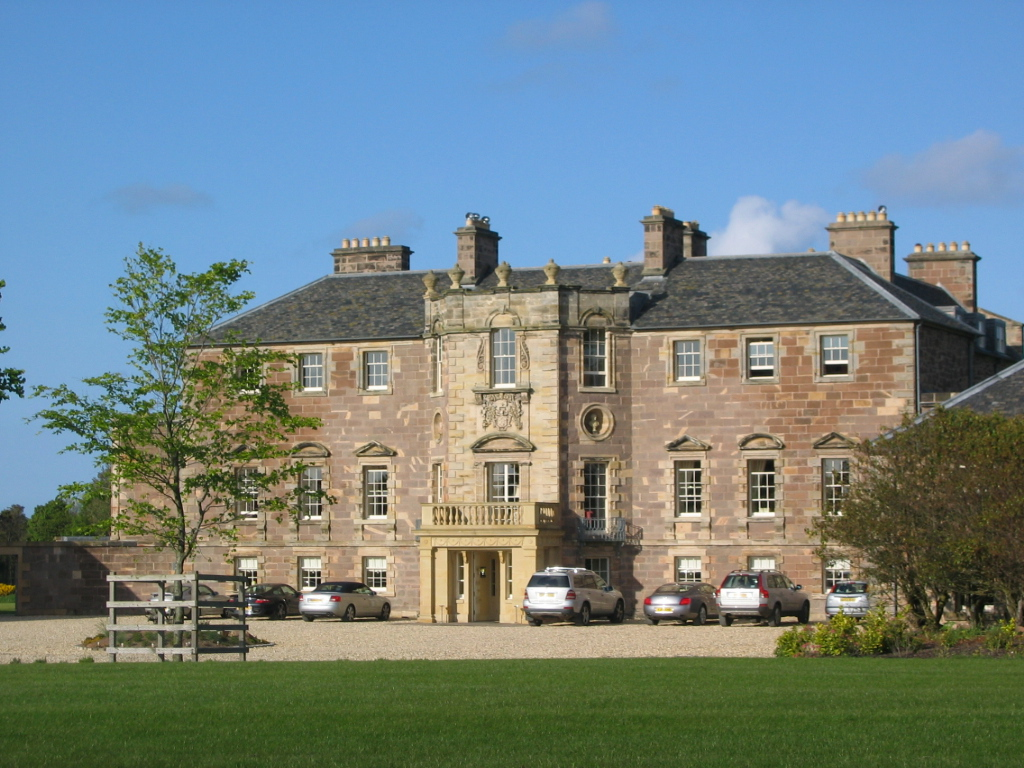
Archerfield House in 2008

The first recorded occupants of the estate were the bowmen of King Edward I, after whom the area would later come to be named. They were encamped at Archerfield during the English advance in 1298. The signs of a village believed to date from the 11th century have also been discovered within the estate.

The centrepiece of the estate is Archerfield House, built in the late 17th century (from when the entrance bay and house centre date), once the seat of the Nisbet family, feudal barons and lairds of Dirleton. It has Palladian windows, and was substantially rebuilt by architect John Douglas c.1745, and added to and altered throughout the 18th century, notably by Scottish architect Robert Adam, who remodelled the interiors in 1790 for William Hamilton Nisbet of Dirleton (1747–1822). It is thought the now vanished park was laid out by Robert Robinson, c.1775. William Hamilton Nisbet's daughter Mary was possibly the best known member of the family, having been married to Lord Thomas Bruce, (later Thomas Bruce, 7th Earl of Elgin), who was credited at the time with saving the famous Elgin Marbles from the ruins of the Parthenon, now in the British Museum, today a subject of some controversy. The relationship ended in divorce, by Act of Parliament in 1808, after she was accused of having an affair. Her father had assumed the additional surname of Hamilton on succeeding to the lands of Biel through his mother, a grandniece of the 2nd Lord Belhaven, and he moved his seat to Biel House near Stenton in East Lothian.

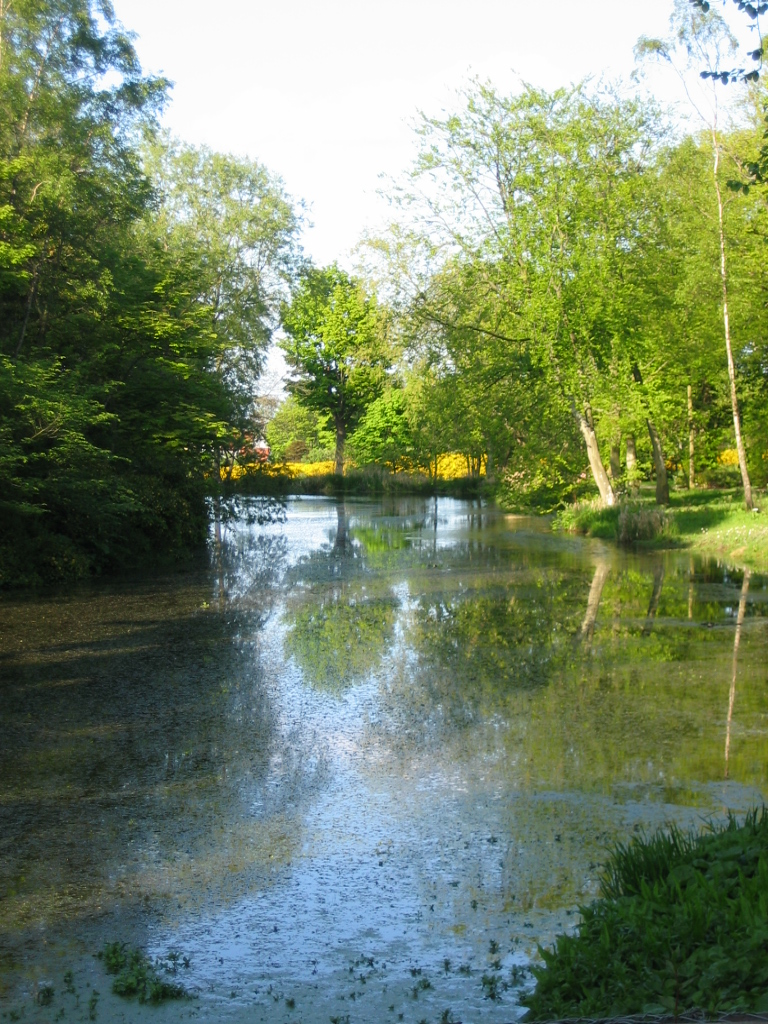
Archerfield House loch

Archerfield House was subsequently rented out, with one famous tenant being H. H. Asquith, the British Prime Minister. The house later fell into disrepair and, after being demoted to the status of farm building, was eventually abandoned.

The estate was acquired in the 1950s by the Mitchell family from Chesterhall Farm near Longniddry, who lived in Marine Villa overlooking the Firth of Forth and the island of Fidra. Occupied during the war, this house was once home to Robert Louis Stevenson, who wrote a short story about it called The Pavilion on the Links. Much of the estate save the pavilion on the links was sold to the Duke of Hamilton in the 1970s and he renovated the mansion's stables. The Duke of Hamilton had also acquired other property in East Lothian including Lennoxlove House prior to this time. Following its sale in 2001, the house was completely renovated and is now the centrepiece of a £55 million golfing development.

== The original Archerfield Links ==
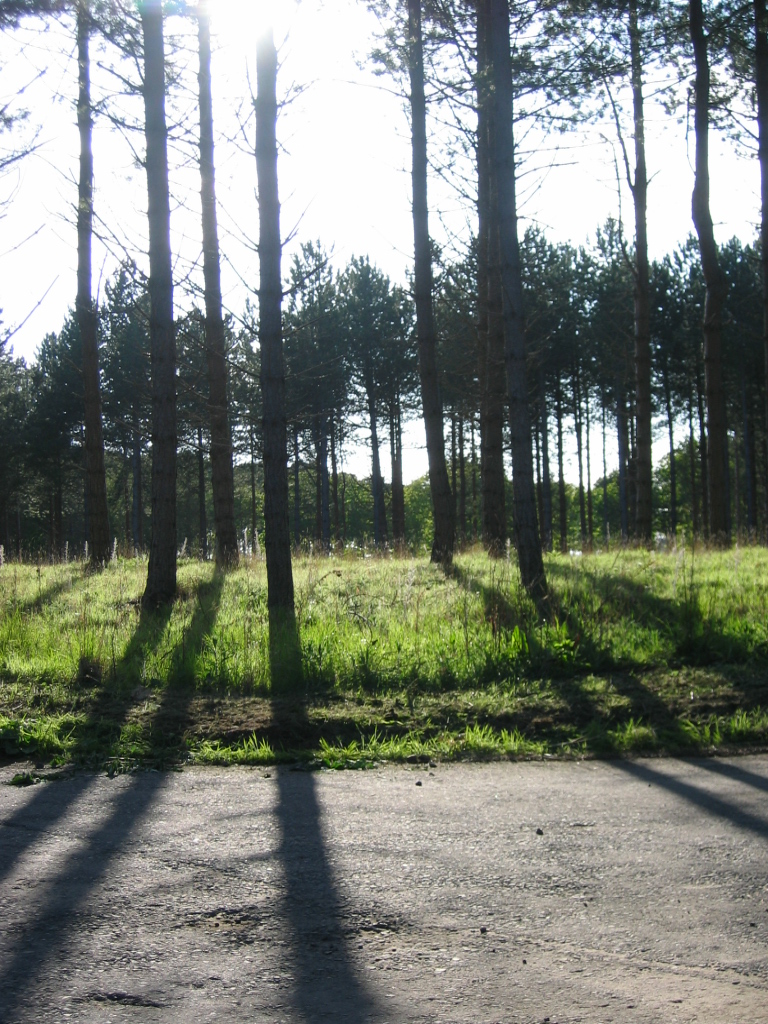
Archerfield woodland

While "coarse golf" is thought to have been played in this area since as far back as the 16th century, the first recognisable course at Archerfield was laid out for the enjoyment of the estate staff in the mid-19th century. The course was extended from the original 13 to a full 18 holes by North Berwick golfing great Ben Sayers in 1910, and became renowned as a charming, if compact course. Nestled between the world-famous courses of Muirfield and the North Berwick West Links, Archerfield seemed set to become another of the famous courses dotted around East Lothian. However, the outbreak of World War II signalled the end of tranquil golf at Archerfield as the estate was taken over by the Ministry of Defence as part of the war effort. The entire estate, including the golf course, was left to become overgrown and all but forgotten by those who had played there. Until construction of the modern golf courses began the land was freely open to the public and used for dog walking, camping and outdoor events.

== The modern Archerfield Links ==
Archerfield Links is now a collective term for two new courses - The Dirleton and The Fidra - that have been created as part of the transformation of the estate into a luxury resort. Both courses were designed by golf architect David J. Russell, with The Dirleton winding inland towards Dirleton village and The Fidra heading towards the coast and the island bird sanctuary of Fidra. Professional golfer Catriona Matthew, now a fixture on the US LPGA tour, and originally from nearby North Berwick, has become an ambassador for the development. In 2006 it was reported that membership of the new Links requires an up-front fee of £35,000 and a yearly subscription of £1500. Archerfield is owned by Edinburgh-based businessman Kevin Doyle and the entire development has been valued at £55 million. Members are known to include sportsmen Alan Shearer, Ryan Giggs and Ian Botham and former The Commotions bassist turned Guardian golf correspondent Lawrence Donegan.

== See also ==
- List of places in East Lothian
- List of historic houses in Scotland
