= Dunbar Harbour =

Seaport in East Lothian, Scotland

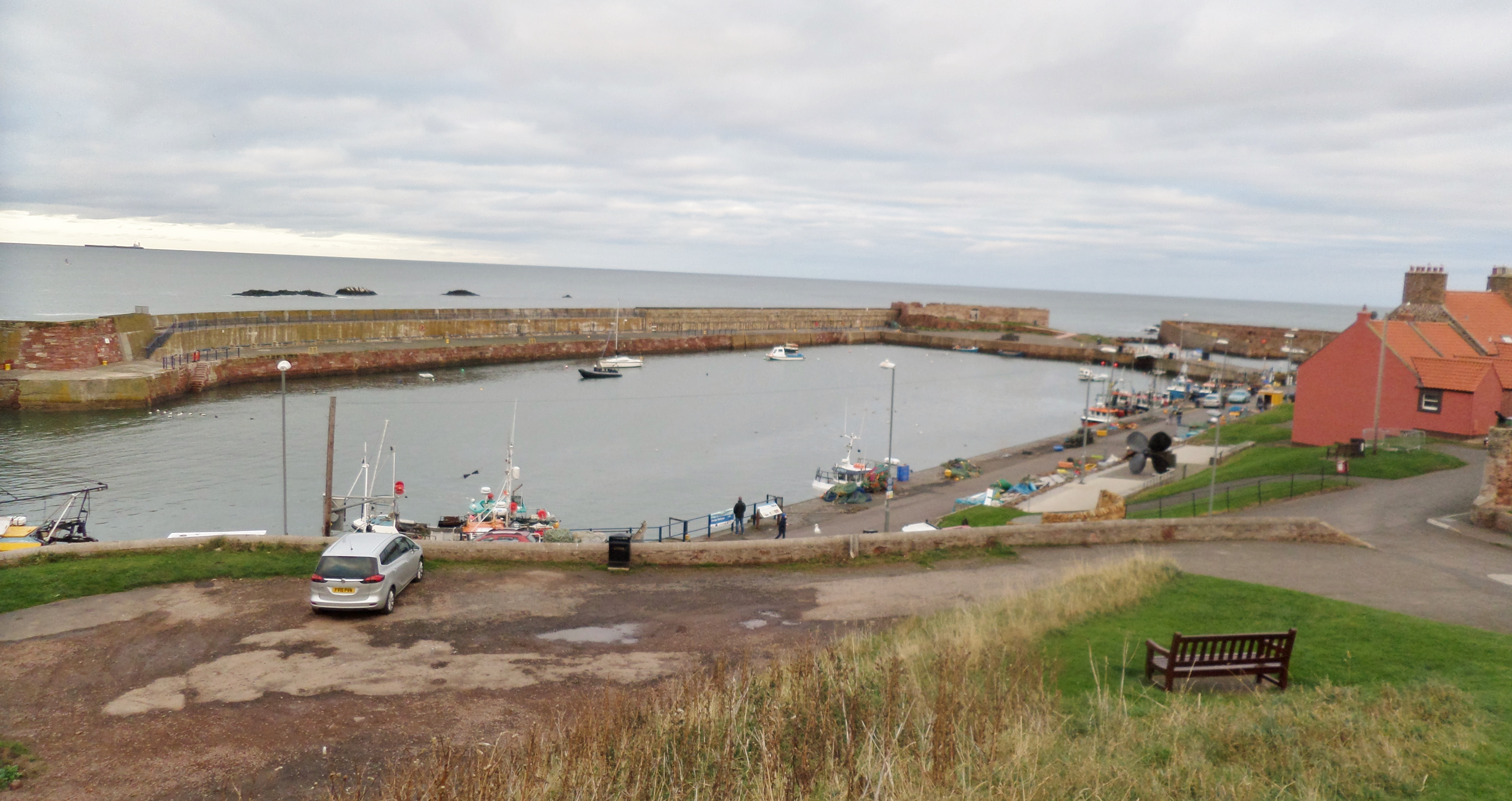
The Victoria Harbour at Dunbar Harbour, in 2017

Dunbar Harbour is a seaport forming the north-east part of the town of Dunbar, East Lothian, Scotland. It is situated on a point projecting from the North Sea coast of East Lothian into the mouth of the Firth of Forth.

The built harbour, on the site of an earlier natural anchorage, comprises three main sections: the Old Harbour, in the east of the port, protected by a sea-wall to its east and north and dating from the late 16th-Century; the New or Victoria Harbour in the west dating from 1842; and Broad Haven, formerly the approach from the Forth to the Old Harbour, but latterly, its entrance having been blocked, providing additional sheltered water between the Old and New Harbours.

The harbour is a trust port, responsibility for which lies since 2004 with the Dunbar Harbour Trust. In prior times the port was controlled by the local authority and, earlier, by the magistrates and council of the burgh. It is the home port for a commercial fishing fleet, offering moorings and fuel and water facilities for pleasure yachts. It is the base for local sailing, rowing and diving clubs, as well as for the Royal National Lifeboat Institution station.

== Port ==
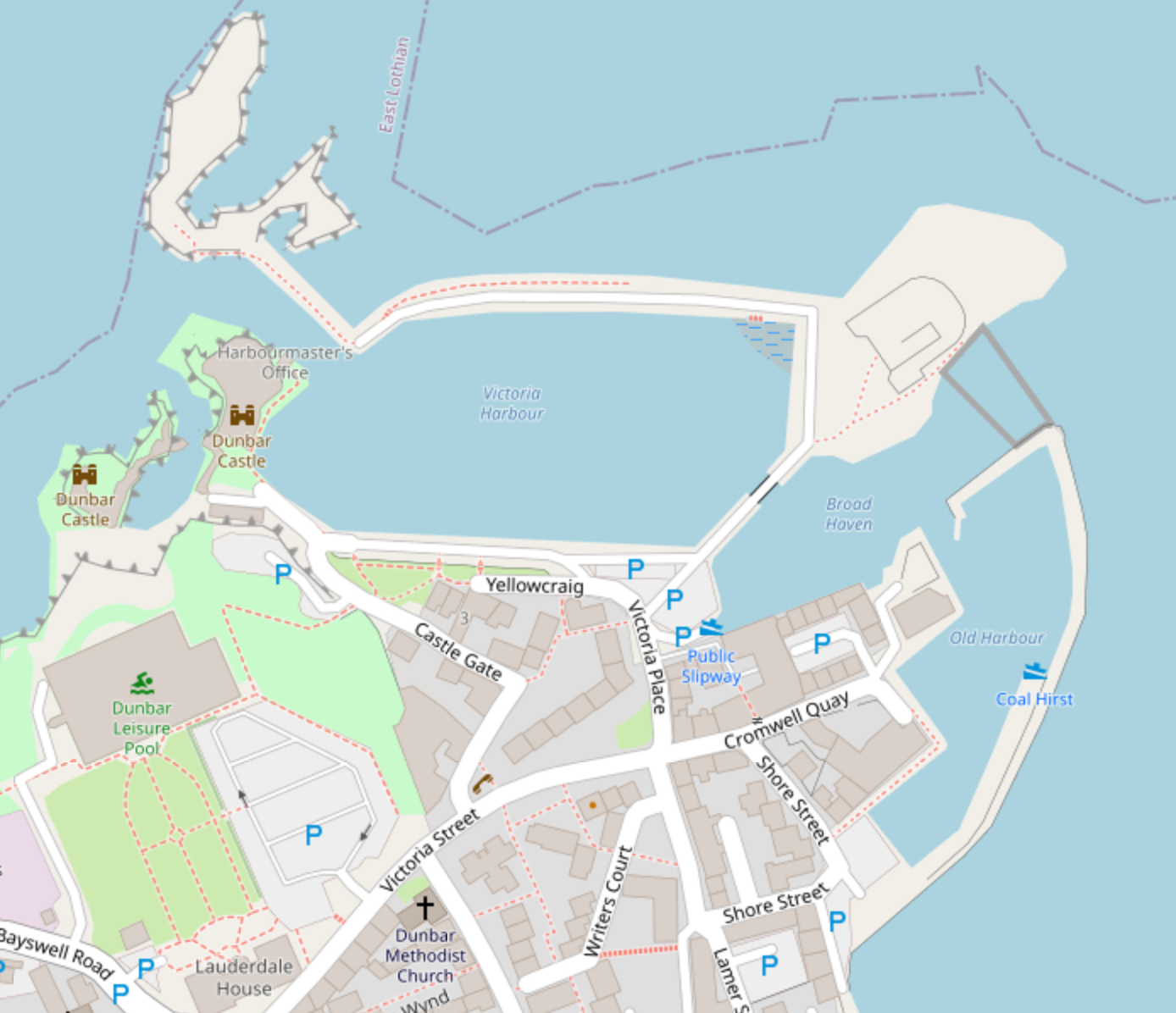
map of Dunbar Harbour in January 2021, from OpenStreetMap

The current port has three distinct harbours. Two of these, the Old Harbour and Broad Haven, date from about 1574 and form the eastern and mid-sections of the complex; the third, known as the New Harbour, or Victoria Harbour, dates from 1842 and forms the western extent of the port. The sole entrance to the port is to the far west, into the Victoria Harbour; a passageway cut through the eastern wall of Victoria Harbour and spanned by a bascule bridge gives access to Broad Haven and the Old Harbour.

The Old Harbour (sometimes Cromwell Harbour) is defined by a 920 ft length eastern sea-wall running from the headland north-east and curving towards the north, terminating short of Lamar Island, a rocky outcrop which long sheltered the prior natural anchorage. The wall has a number of different forms of masonry, including the use of large boulders, rough-set blocks and slabs and giving the impression of the sum of works and repairs done over the centuries. The wall is up to 16 ft wide and has two walkways at varying heights, as well as a parapet of up to 5.5 ft in height. The east wall terminates at a pier head which, up to 1879, was a roundel. A return wall extends some 170 ft south-west from the pier head, enclosing the north of the Old Harbour and forming the south-east wall of Broad Haven. Approaching a projecting quay, the return wall cuts back to a south-east and then southerly direction and, together with the quay, forms a 35 ft wide entrance to the Old Harbour. The harbour is 565 ft north-south and varies in width; a southerly inner-basin is 58 ft wide whilst the wider main basin is up to 175 ft wide. The Old Harbour has a water area of 1.75 acres, with a depth of 9 ft at neap tides and 14 ft at spring high-water. At low tide it is dry.

To the north-west of Old Harbour, Broad Haven (sometimes the Fairway) is a short 150 ft wide channel once providing access to the Old Harbour entrance, but now enclosed by a rubble sea-break continuing the curving line of the eastern sea-wall to meet Lamar Island. It is defined on its south-east side by the Old Harbour's return-wall, and on its north-west by a south-west/north-east causeway linking the mainland to the island. In contemporary times, access to Broad Haven is made from the Victoria Harbour via a 30 ft wide breach in the causeway, spanned by a bascule bridge. Like the Old Harbour, Broad Haven is dry at low tide.

The western section of the port is the New or Victoria Harbour, the construction of which dates from 1842. It is defined by an east–west sea-wall running from the west of Lamar Island, to a point north-east of the promontory on which stands the ruins of Dunbar Castle, when it turns south-west and then north-west to form a 45 ft wide sea-entrance. The promontory forms the west side of the harbour; mainland quayside the south, and the Lamar Island causeway the eastern wall. Victoria Harbour provides a protected water area of 5 acres, having a depth of 4 ft at low-water spring tides, and 18 ft at high-water spring tides.

=== Structures ===
Dunbar Lifeboat Station, constructed in 1901 and continuing a service dating from 1808.

The port complex has a number of notable structures: on Lamar Island, a fort with a battery of 16 guns was constructed from 1781 to guard against invasion and privateers; armaments were removed some time after the conclusion of the Peninsular War in 1814. The fort's structures were thereafter little used until 1874 when a hospital for infectious diseases was established pursuant to the Public Health (Scotland) Act 1867 (30 & 31 Vict. c. 101). This closed in 1905/6, although the premises were on occasion used as an overspill hospital. It was re-opened as a war hospital in 1914 and lasted through to 1926/7, after which the structure was for a period let as accommodation. In modern times the battery has been repurposed, in part as an outdoor arts venue.

A 19th century two-leaf bascule bridge spans the navigation through the mainland to Lamar Island causeway.

On the mainland, a number of 18th-century maltings buildings are noted in Canmore, on Shore Street, Lamer Street and Colvin Street. Spott's Granary, an 18th century three-story warehouse, sits on the quay forming the south-west side of the Old Harbour, and Horseburgh's Warehouse, another 18th century warehouse, much repurposed over the years, sits on Lamar Street. All have now been converted to housing.

A number of houses surrounding the harbour were commissioned by the local authority to cater for fishing families and designed, in varying styles and configurations, by Sir Basil Spence. Constructed in the 1924-1956 period, part of the development received a Saltire Award for housing design in 1951–2.

A 15 ft high Fishermans' Memorial was erected in the 1856-1861 period at the south-end of the east wall of the Old Harbour to a design by Alexander Handyside Ritchie, and contains a barometer (no longer working) for the use of fishermen. (Note: The use and public display of barometers in fishing ports was promulgated in the north-east of England by Algernon Percy, 4th Duke of Northumberland from 1859 onwards, perhaps influencing Dunbar's memorial.) An RNLI Lifeboat Station is operated from a 1901 building in the port complex; lifeboat service from the port dates back to 1808.

== History ==
=== Belhaven ===
For centuries Dunbar has been a port, although the harbour was originally situated at Belhaven, which lies to the west of Dunbar. The first known reference to this port is in an 1153 grant to the monks of May, at the formation of the Isle of May Priory, of a homestead "near my port of Bele" given by Gospatric III, Earl of Lothian. It is referenced again in a 1369/70 grant by David II of Scotland to George Dunbar, 10th Earl of March of "a free Dunbar ... and a free port at the Bellehaven ... with free entry and exit of ships". Belhaven continued in use up to the 19th-century; its site is thought to be on land now reclaimed by the C19 construction of a sea-wall running east–west between Belhaven village and Biel Water. (Note: An approximate position for Belhaven harbour is 55.99786°N 2.54343°W)

=== Lamerhaven ===
A port at Dunbar itself is first mentioned in a 1555 charter as Lamerhaven "on the east side of the castle of Dunbar", being presumably a natural anchorage sheltered to the north by Lamer Island (on which the Dunbar Battery sits and which is linked to the mainland by the causeway forming the south-east walls of the much later Victoria Harbour). A remark in Jean de Beaugué's 1556 Histoire de la Guerre d'Ecosse pedant les campagnes 1548 et 1549 — 'since a harbour could easily be made and at little cost' at Dunbar — suggests Lamerhaven was completely undeveloped in the mid-16th-century.

=== Old Harbour ===
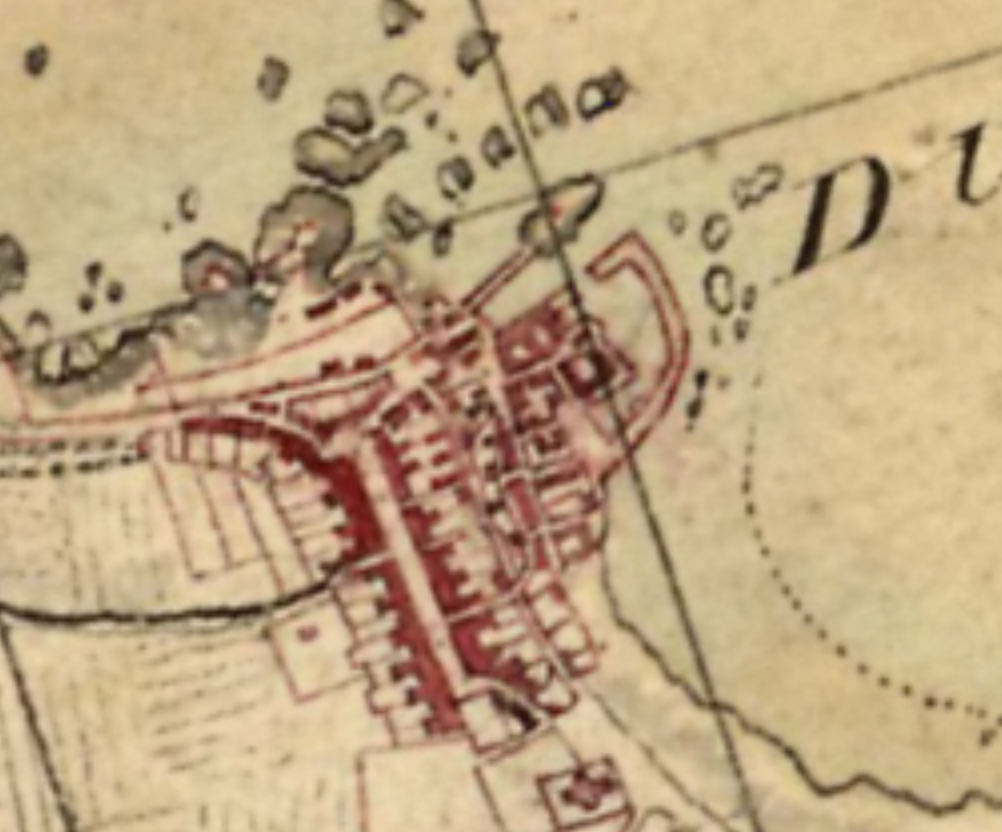
Dunbar and its (old) harbour, from Roy's Military Survey of Scotland, 1747-1755

Artificial harbour works probably commenced some time after 1574, when the Register of the Privy Council of Scotland records a grant to the town to collect customs duty to fund 'the building of a haven under the town, to the east of the Castle'. A number of documents in the 1591 to 1641 period reference artificial bulwarks, and the repeated need to make repairs to the port structure.

The need for a viable port in this period arises from the extent of the Dutch as well as the Scottish fishery industry of the time; indicatively, in 1577, it is claimed, no less than one thousand boats were wrecked on the Scottish east coast. Thomas Tucker's 1656 Report upon the settlement of the revenues of excise and customs in Scotland mentions the town as "famous for the herring fishery" and at that time the harbour would appear to have been only capable of accommodating the small class of herring boats then in vogue.

Exactly what the earliest structures were is unclear, but Graham surmises that they were much the same as the contemporary configuration; an eastern sea-wall and a causeway from the land to Lamar Island; and that some of their fabric is incorporated in contemporary structures.

In December, 1655, the harbour suffered so severely from storm damage that the inhabitants were compelled to petition Parliament for aid in its restoration; and, in 1658, when, apparently, the "outer head" and "cross dike" were demolished, they applied for the same purpose to the Magistrates and Town Council of Edinburgh. Scotland had been invaded in 1650 by the English under The Protectorate of Oliver Cromwell, which annexed much of the Scottish Lowlands following the Battle of Dunbar. Two Scottish Acts of Parliament, in March 1656 and April 1657, relieved Dunbar of certain assessments (taxes) and made recommendations that further assistance be given. A sum of £300 is recorded in the Statistical Account as having been granted to the Burgh; upon which the strong association of Cromwell with the port is founded, and from which comes an erroneous presumption that Cromwell's funding marked the start of construction of the port. (Note: Referring to Francis Hindes Groome's 1894 Ordnance Gazetteer of Scotland, Angus Graham notes that "There is thus little to support Groome's statement that the Old Harbour was 'commenced with a grant of £300 from Cromwell'")

This history of the harbour is one of gradual evolution and repeated repair. Although some authorities, such as James Miller in his 1859 The history of Dunbar asserts that "for some years prior to 1735, the harbour had become almost ruinous" Graham argues that the record of work undertaken at the port from 1717 onwards renders the impression unacceptable.

Work in the early 18th-Century includes building (or rebuilding) the return wall from the pier head, commenced in 1717; and from 1720 repeated projects to cut back bedrock and so considerably increase the anchorage space within the port and the safety of navigation within and on its approaches. The square inner basin of the harbour probably dates to this early period. Such works were considerable, involving quarrying and removal of average depths of 8 feet (2.4 m) of rock. New quays were built, from 1720 east of Spotts Granary, and later eastwards around the inner harbour. In 1761 a coal wharf at the inner landward end of the east wall was constructed and in 1785 the so-called holey pier opposite the return wall was laid down.

Funding for this work was provided by the Burgh authorities, who were permitted to levy a duty on ale and beer for a period of 44 years from 1719; but in addition, contributions were made by the Convention of Royal Burghs. (Note: There is a repeated pattern of Scottish Royal Burghs providing assistance to Dunbar for its harbour; probably reflecting the very national role it played as a place of importation and exportation, as port of refuge and as a supplier of herring.)

=== Broad Haven ===
The history of Broad Haven, like the Old Harbour, is one of gradual widening, deepening and making safe by the removal of bedrock to provide width and depth, and the smoothing of stones to decrease collision damage. Projects are noted in 1721, 1737 and, especially, 1750 where purchases of gunpowder for "blowing the Island" are recorded along with the name of the master-blaster, John Stewart.

Through the 19th century a number of variants of the use of removable booms to act as entrance gates to the Old Harbour were employed, between configurations of the end of the return wall and the quayside to its south-west. Multiple squared timbers were craned into and out of slots in the wall; but boom systems appear frequently to have been destroyed by storms and in any event disfavourably narrowed the harbour entrance.

Some time after 1842, and probably as part of the design for the Victoria Harbour, a cut was made in the causeway forming the north-west wall of Broad Haven to allow access to and from the New Harbour. It is possible that the original cut was 26 foot (7.9 m) wide and probably spanned by a metal bridge. The current navigation is 30 foot (9.1 m) wide with a bascule bridge installed in 1860.

More recently the port was reconfigured by stopping up the sea-entrance of Broad Haven, transforming its area into additional safe harbour and making the cut through the causeway and Victoria Harbour's sea-entrance the sole route to the sea.

=== Victoria Harbour ===
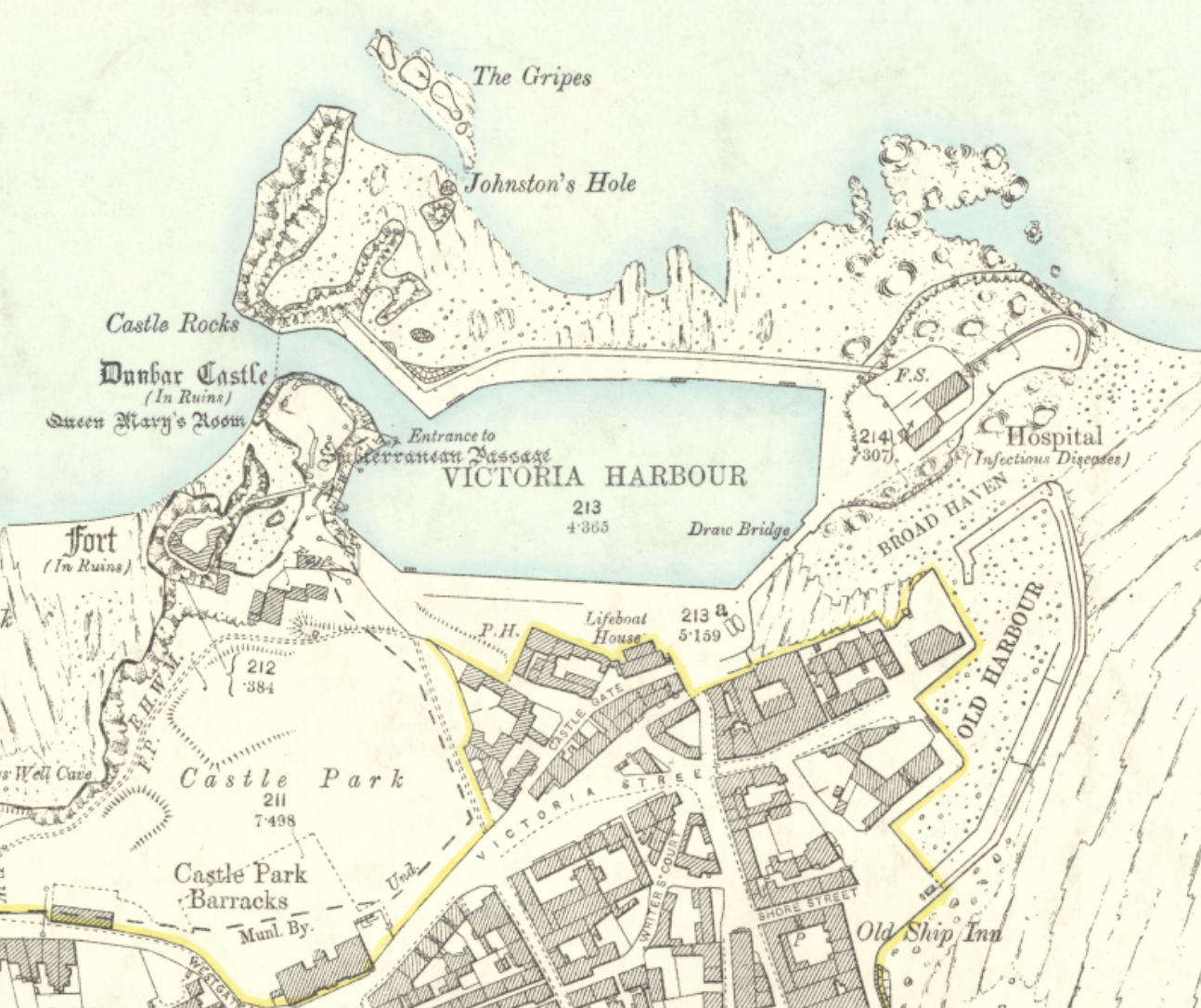
Dunbar and port in 1893–4, showing the addition of the 1842 Victoria Harbour

Dunbar also has the Victoria Harbour, commenced in September 1842, in answer to the petitions of above two thousand fishermen. The Treasury agreed to construct it as a refuge harbour for fishing-boats and other small craft, provided the Corporation of Dunbar would advance £4,500 towards the expense. This amount the Corporation duly paid, and also gave the use of a quarry. The Board of British White Herring Fishery undertook to find £2,500, and, with the sanction of the Treasury, carried out the building, excavating, and finishing of the works, which were designed by Mr. Joseph Mitchell, C.E., letting it by contract to the lowest tender, £12,990.

It was soon apparent to the contractors and the local authorities that the works would prove defective, owing to the material used in the formation of the sea-barrier — soft free-stone, and to the mode of construction below water, the stone being set dry. After various remonstrances, Mr. James Walker, C.E., was sent by the Admiralty to inspect and report. He suggested considerable additions, involving a further cost of £2,000, which might enable the works to stand if care were taken in the erection. Even with these additions, both the Corporation and contractors felt doubtful, and immediately on the works being completed, the latter anxiously pressed on the engineer of the Fishery Board to have them taken off their hands. The Dunbar Corporation declined to take the responsibility for the works because they were repeatedly being injured by storms. Repairs were executed by the Fishery Board, but only in a temporary manner, nothing being done to render the works permanently stable, although their own engineer pointed out the causes of failure and suggested a remedy.

At the end of 1856, owing to a serious breach made in the sea-wall, and the ruin of the harbour appearing imminent and as the Fishery Board appeared unable to cope with the difficulty, the Corporation of Dunbar petitioned the Government, through the Chancellor of the Exchequer, to obtain a Treasury grant. Nearly two years elapsed before it was finally decided to give a grant of £10,000 absolutely, and for the Public Works Loan Commissioners to advance £20,000 on the security of the Victoria Harbour dues and part of the Old Harbour dues.

The Victoria Harbour, as completed by the Board of Fisheries was insecure but also was, like the Old Harbour, dry at low tide. The £30,000 obtained was expended on rebuilding the sea-wall with hard whinstone outside of the existing one. It was also arranged to make a wharf on the land side, deepen the harbour 4 ft. below low water level, and to form an access and swing-bridge, to enable boats to use the eastern entrance when the direction of the wind made it advantageous. These works were carried out under the superintendence of Messrs. D. & T. Stevenson, Civil Engineers, Edinburgh.

In 1879 again the heavy storms prevailing did serious damage and two breaches were made in a portion of the old and soft stone sea-wall of the Victoria Harbour; and the pier-head of the old harbour was also destroyed. The Treasury expended about £3,500 in repairing the breaches in the New Harbour and in dredging the entrance. At its own cost, the burgh of Dunbar expended £1,800 in repairing the damage to the Old Harbour.

The sum spent on this harbour - about £60,000 — seems large in proportion to its size; but it includes the first expenditure and the work of excavation was in rock; a portion in the channel was in whinstone, which was blasted and the bottom smoothed by means of the diving-bell.

In the 1880s, further improvements were effected by the laying down of booms between the New and Old Harbours to check the outward flow.

=== Revenue history ===
The ordinary finances of the Dunbar Harbours were controlled by the magistrates and council of the burgh. The income was, however, very limited. Customs dues were collected for goods coming into the harbour, but after their abolition, in 1886 a Provisional Order for levying dues was granted. Boat licenses also form an item of revenue, producing in the year 1858 the amount of £125 4s. The arrangement is that large boats compound for the herring teind leviable on herring, whitefish, and lobsters, and for the harbour dues by an annual payment of £2 per boat, and small boats for a payment of £1. The total revenue from the harbour for the year ending October 15, 1887, was £461 1s. 17d., the expenditure for the same period was £544 16s. 9¾d.

In 1888 it is recorded that there were about 50 herring boats belonging to the port, while in 1830 there were 133 open boats in the Custom House district of Dunbar. In the latter year there were also 35 sea-going vessels registered at the port. In 1859 there were only six.

=== Trade history ===
Dunbar had by 1888 ceased to be a port of registry. A regular trade was for many years carried on by sailing-vessels transporting potatoes to the London, the district around Dunbar being famed for the fine quality of this vegetable, which obtained the highest price in the market. In 1886 a weekly steamer ran between Dunbar and London, carrying about 10,000 tons in the season. The remainder of the shipping trade consists principally of inward cargoes of coal, grain, esparto grass, timber, oil cake, china, glass, and wood pulps.

In 1886, the number of vessels frequenting the port, exclusive of fishing-craft, was 68. Ship building was formerly an industry of Dunbar.

== Notes ==
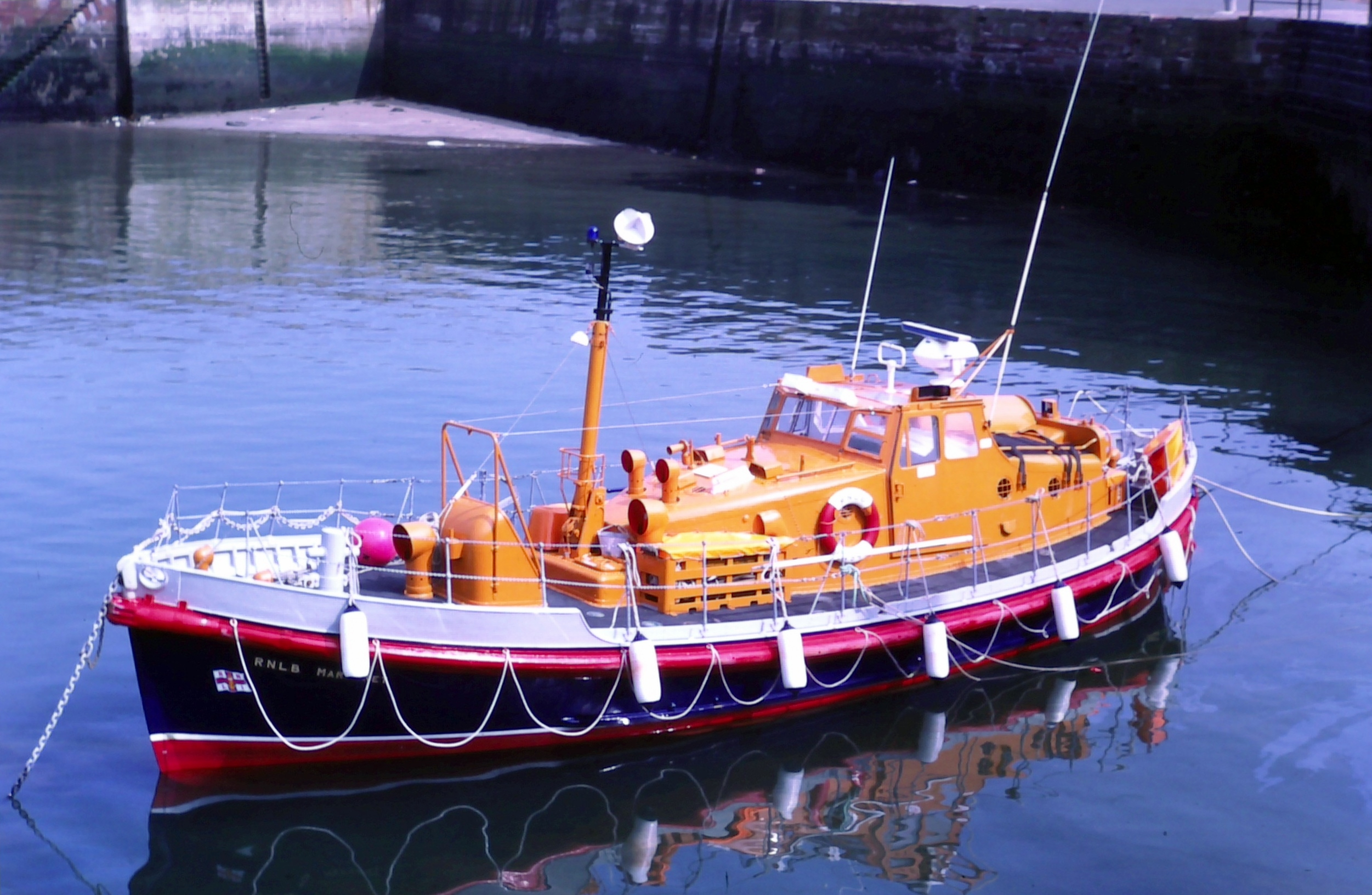
RNLI lifeboat in Dunbar Harbour, 1981
