= Biel, East Lothian =

Coordinates: 55.975°N 2.585°W

Biel
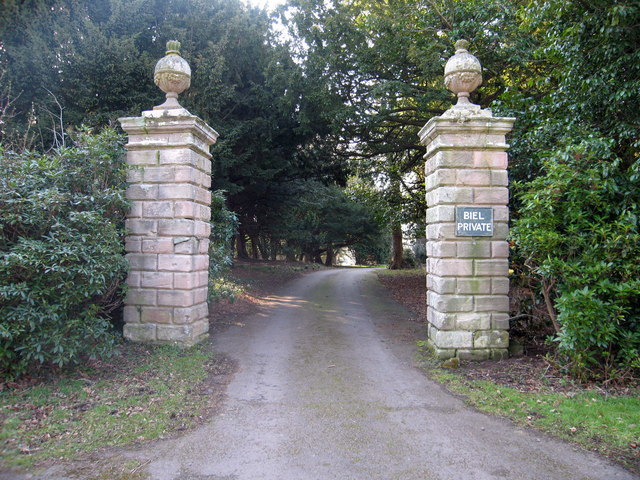
- Entrance pillars to Biel, East Lothian

- Location within Scotland
- OS grid reference: NT634759
- Civil parish: Stenton
- Council area: East Lothian Council
- Lieutenancy area: East Lothian
- Country: Scotland
- Sovereign state: United Kingdom
- Post town: DUNBAR
- Postcode district: EH42
- Dialling code: 01368
- Police: Scotland
- Fire: Scottish
- Ambulance: Scottish
- UK Parliament: East Lothian
- Scottish Parliament: East Lothian

Biel is a village in East Lothian, Scotland, UK, to the south of Dunbar, off the B6370 road. It is situated on the Biel Estate, close to Biel House.

== Placename ==
The word 'biel', 'beil' or 'bel' means "shelter", as in Belton, Belhaven, Bilsdean, or as in Robert Lauder of Beilmouth.

== History ==
Archaeologists from Glasgow University found the remains of a small farmstead over 2000 years old, possibly with a palisade surrounding a roundhouse.

The Biel estate was originally owned by the Earls of Dunbar, then by Robert Lauder of The Bass. Sir James Hamilton, Sheriff of Lanark, bought Biel in 1641.

William Hamilton Nisbet succeeded to the Biel lands and made Biel House his residence. It is a 12th-century tower house, off the B6370, and a member of the Historic Houses Association.

== Biel House ==
The present Biel House is a 16th-century three-storey listed building, formerly owned by the Earls of Belhaven. William Atkinson extended it in 1814–1818, and in the early twentieth century, further interior alterations were made by R.R.Anderson. The grounds include a chapel, rock garden, doocot, summerhouse, gatepiers, deer park, woodland, arboretum, kitchen garden, glasshouses.

== Biel Water (Biel Burn) ==
The Biel Water, locally known as the Biel Burn, flows through the Biel Estate, and Biel Mill is situated in a woodland.

The Biel Burn Flood of 1948 is still remembered by local residents. The latest flooding incident occurred in 2007.

== Photo gallery ==
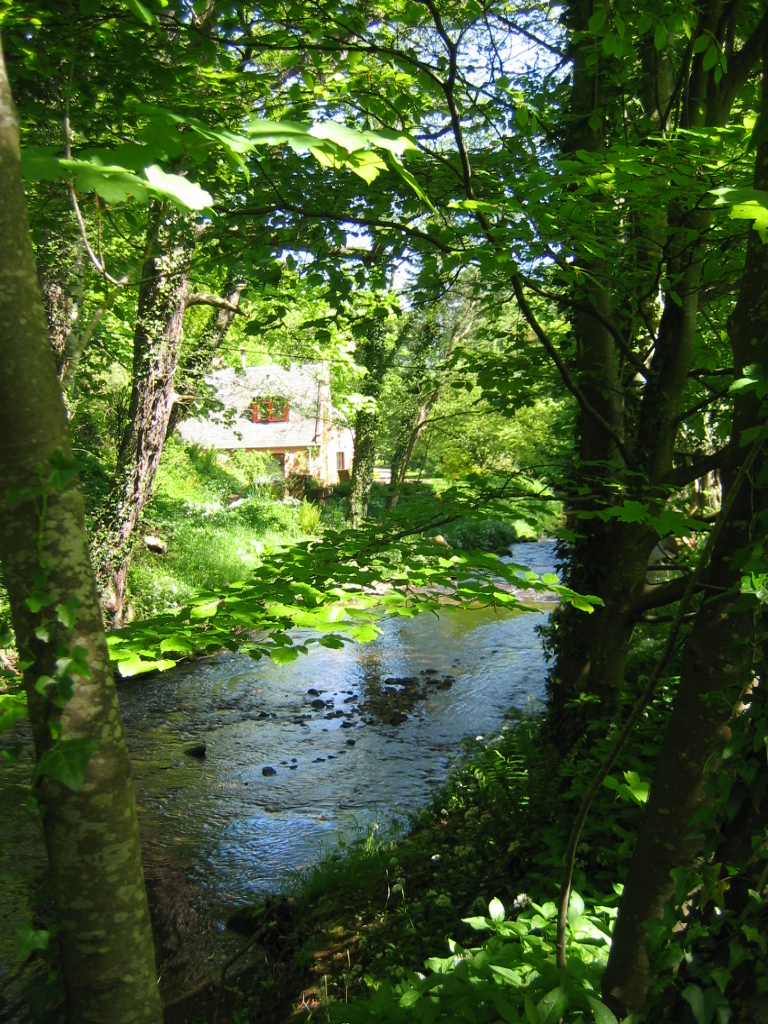

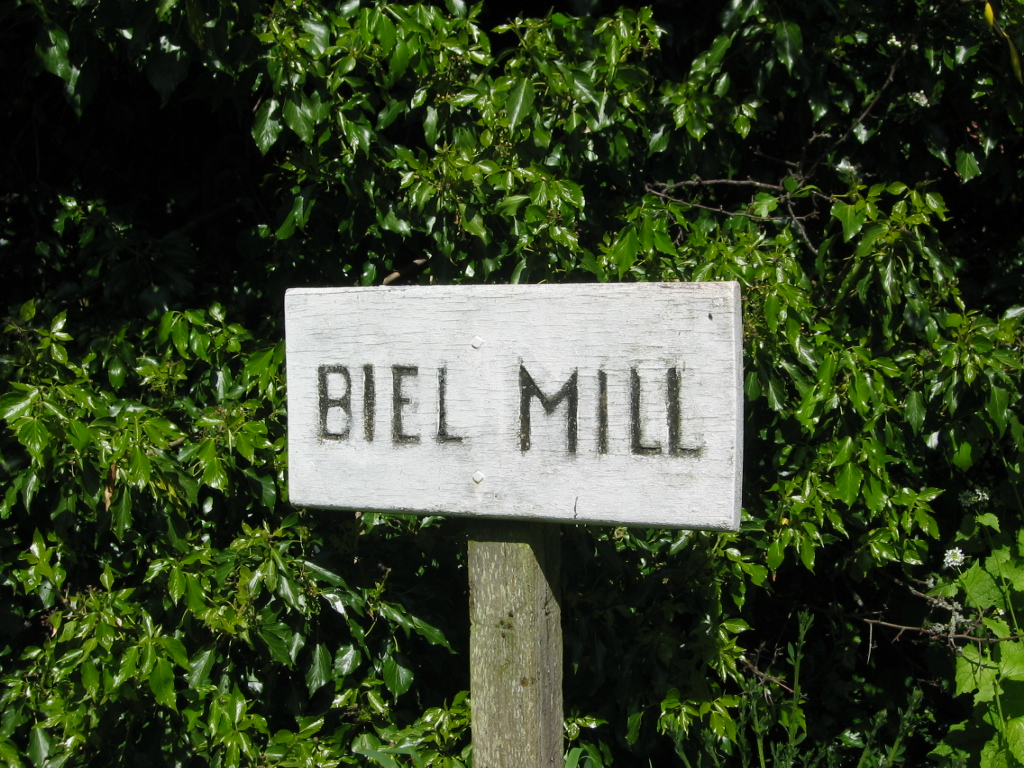

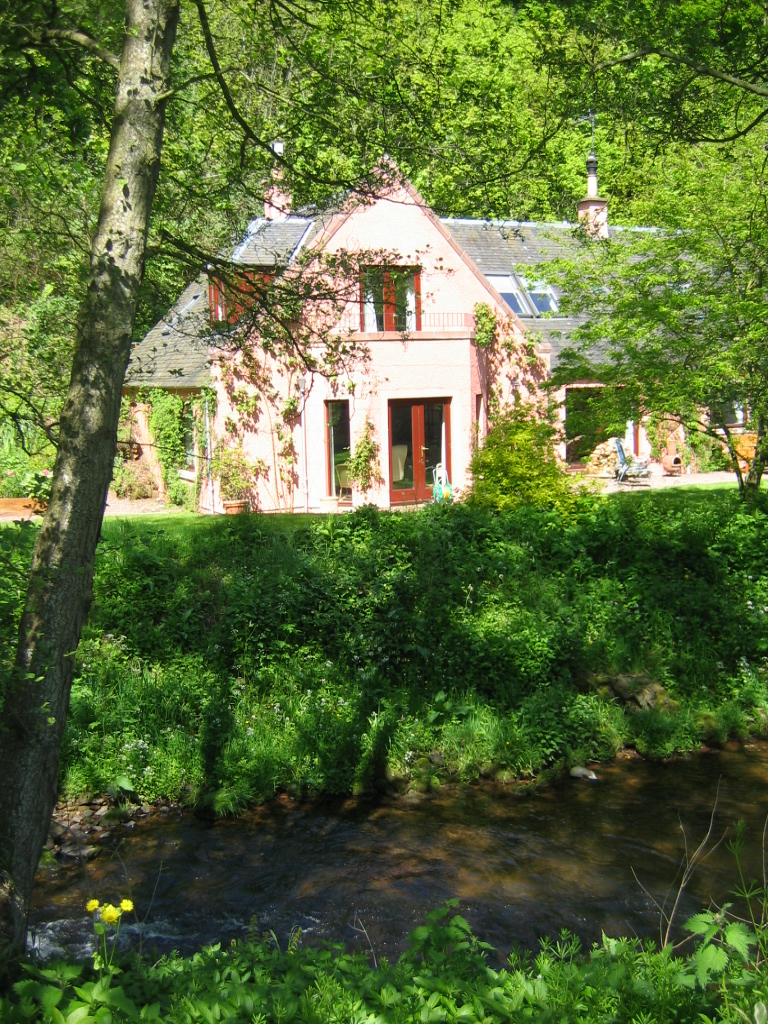

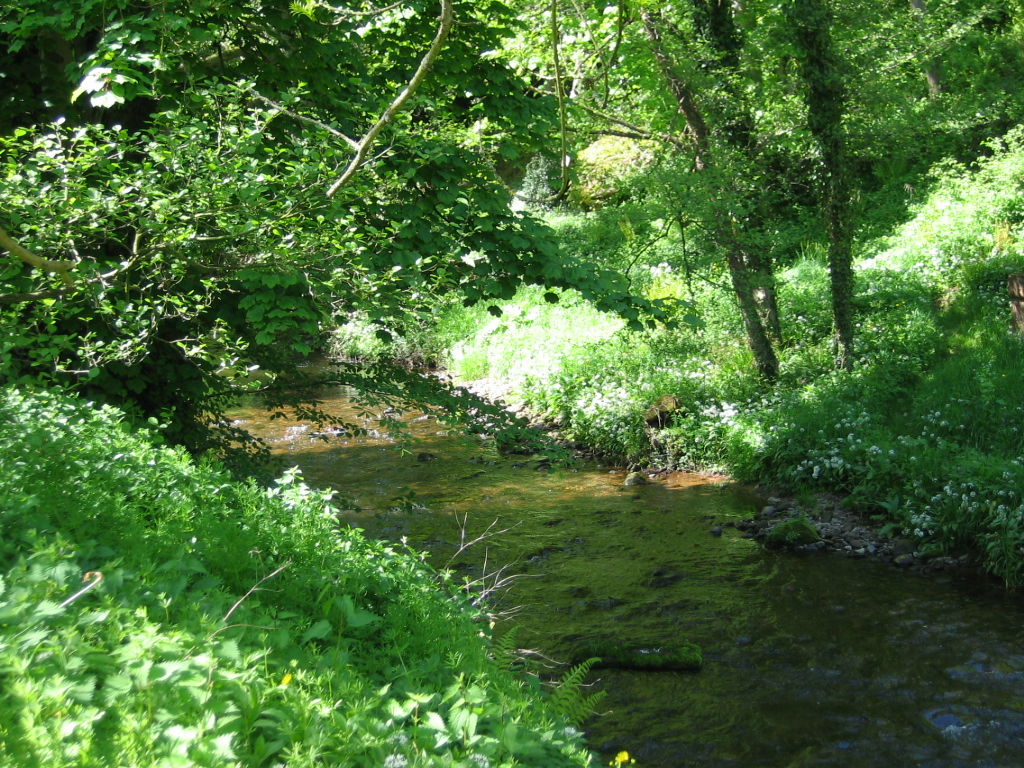

== See also ==
- List of places in East Lothian
