= Biel House =

Coordinates: 55°58′29″N 2°35′19″W

Designations

Inventory of Gardens and Designed Landscapes in Scotland
- Official name: Biel
- Designated: 30 June 1987
- Reference no.: GDL00057

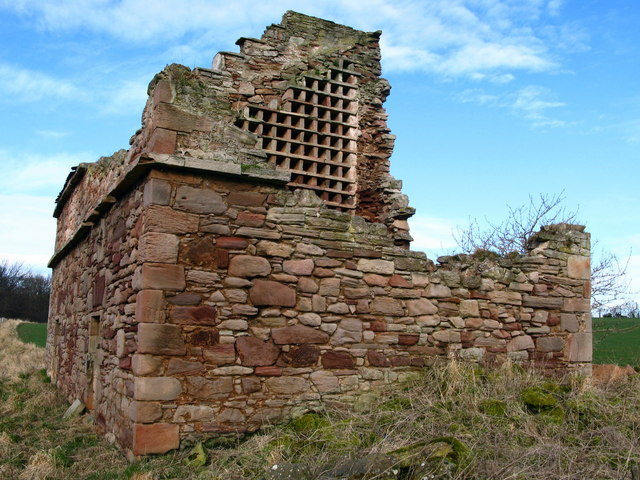
Biel House Doocot In a field some distance from Biel mansion is a 19th century double lectern-type doocot with two doors and two small round windows. Also 24 entry holes in a row midway up the roofs. Inside, there is a large number of stone nests, and a potence ladder in one chamber. The east room of the doocot is in quite a ruinous condition.

Biel House is a historic house on the Biel Estate near Stenton, East Lothian, Scotland. It is a Category A listed building.

== House ==
The present Biel House dates from the 16th century, is statutorily listed, and is a castellated three-storey building. It was formerly owned by the Earls of Belhaven. William Atkinson extended it between 1814 and 1818, and early in the 20th century further alterations of the interior were made by R. R. Anderson.

James VI came to Biel and Ormiston to hunt in October 1599.

== Grounds ==
The grounds of Biel House have many interesting features:

- Biel Water which flows through the estate, past Biel Mill
- A range of buildings, including a chapel, doocot, summerhouse, a bridge, gate piers and glasshouses
- Deer park, kitchen garden, rock garden, gull pond, and extensive woodland

== See also ==
- Bilsdean
- Biel Water
- List of places in East Lothian
