= Firth of Forth =

Estuary of Scotland's River Forth

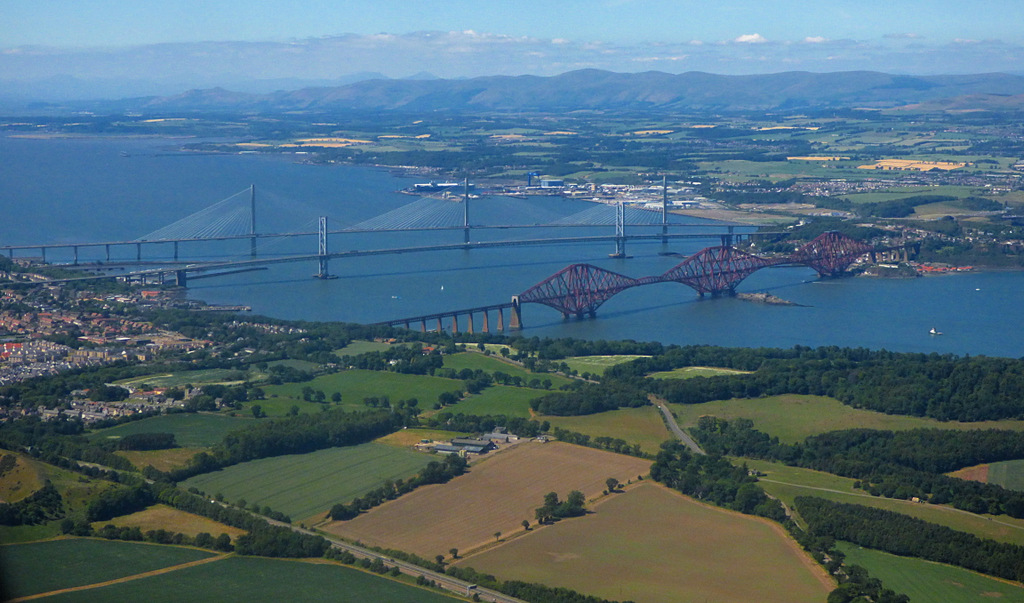
- The Forth bridges looking northwest

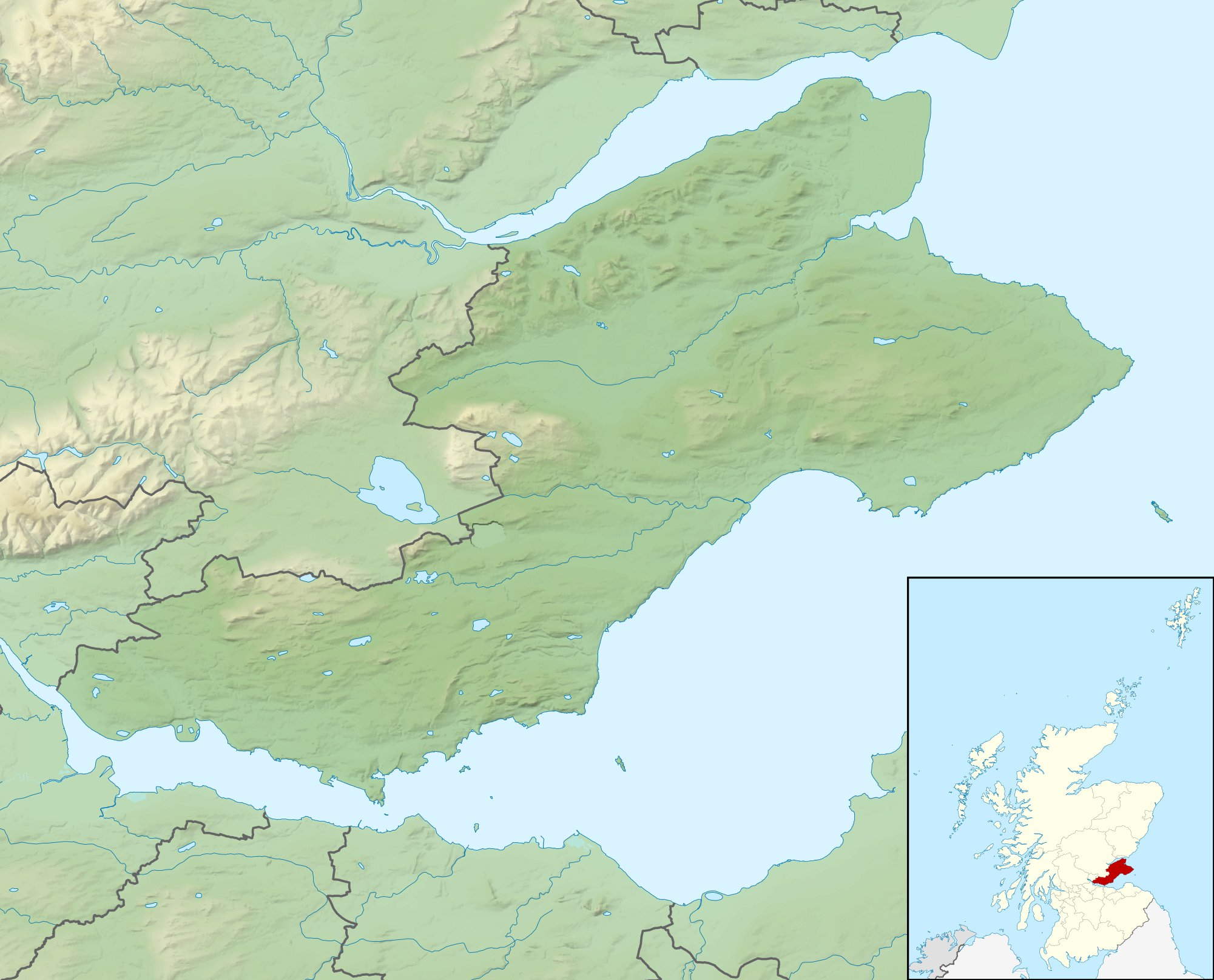
- Location within Scotland Location within Fife
- Location: Scotland, United Kingdom
- Coordinates: 56.048°N 3.053°W
- Basin countries: Scotland, United Kingdom

Ramsar Wetland
- Designated: 30 October 2001
- Reference no.: 1111

The Firth of Forth (Scottish Gaelic: Linn Giùdain or Linne Foirthe) is a bay in Scotland, an inlet of the North Sea that separates Fife to its north and Lothian to its south. Further inland, it becomes the estuary of the River Forth and several other rivers.

== Name ==
Firth is a Scots (and English) word used mostly in Scotland to denote various forms of coastal waters, including bays. It's a cognate of fjord, a Norse word meaning a narrow inlet.

Forth stems from the name of the river. This is *vo-rit-ia ('slow running') in Proto-Celtic, yielding Foirthe in Old Gaelic and Gweryd in Welsh.

It was known as Bodotria in Roman times and was referred to as Βοδερία in Ptolemy's Geography. In the Norse sagas, it was known as the Myrkvifiörd. An early Welsh name is Merin Iodeo, or the 'sea of Iudeu'.

== Geography and geology ==
Geologically, the Firth of Forth was formed as a fjord by the Forth Glacier in the last glacial period which scoured out the existing Forth Valley. Over time, most of it was transformed into a wide bay with gently sloping banks by natural processes.

The drainage basin for the Firth of Forth covers a wide geographic area including places as far from the shore as Ben Lomond, Cumbernauld, Harthill, Penicuik and the edges of Gleneagles Golf Course.

Many towns line the shores, as well as the petrochemical complexes at Grangemouth, commercial docks at Leith, former oil rig construction yards at Methil, the ship breaking facility at Inverkeithing and the former naval dockyard at Rosyth, along with numerous other industrial areas, including the Forth Bridgehead area, encompassing Rosyth, Inverkeithing and the southern edge of Dunfermline, Burntisland, Kirkcaldy, Bo'ness and Leven.

=== Bridges ===
The firth is bridged in two areas. The Kincardine Bridge and the Clackmannanshire Bridge cross at Kincardine, while further east the Forth Bridge, the Forth Road Bridge and the Queensferry Crossing cross from North Queensferry to South Queensferry.

== History ==
The Romans reportedly made a bridge of around 900 boats, probably at South Queensferry. In the 10th century, the river was considered the boundary of "Scotia" and was sometimes called "The Scots Water". The inner firth, located between the Kincardine and Forth bridges, has lost about half of its former intertidal area as a result of land reclamation, partly for agriculture, but mainly for industry and the large ash lagoons built to deposit spoil from the coal-fired Longannet Power Station near Kincardine. Historic villages line the Fife shoreline; Limekilns, Charlestown and Culross, established in the 6th century, where Saint Kentigern was born.

Construction of the Forth Bridge, a railway bridge, began in 1882 and was opened on 4 March 1890 carrying the Edinburgh–Aberdeen line.

The youngest person to swim across the Firth of Forth was 13-year-old Joseph Feeney, who accomplished the feat in 1933. In October 1936, the Kincardine Bridge opened.

On 4 September 1964, the Forth Road Bridge opened. From 1964 to 1982, a tunnel existed under the Firth of Forth, dug by coal miners to link the Kinneil colliery on the south side of the Forth with the Valleyfield colliery on the north side. This is shown in the 1968 educational film Forth – Powerhouse for Industry. The shafts leading into the tunnel were filled and capped with concrete when the tunnel was closed, and it is believed to have flooded with water or collapsed in places.

In January 1987, the first Loony Dook event took place. During this event, individuals dive or wade into the Forth on New Years Day.

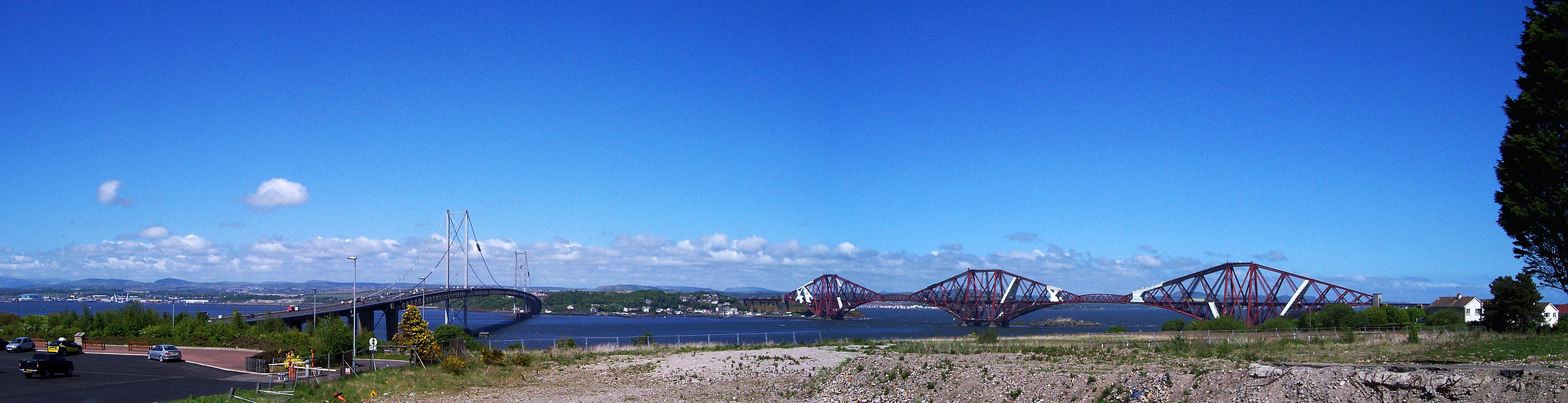
Two of the three bridges across the Firth, viewed from Dalmeny, Photo taken before construction began on the Queensferry Crossing.

On 27 February 2001, a Short 360 owned by the Scottish airline Loganair operating as Flight 670A ditched into the Firth of Forth after both of the plane's engines torque went to zero. After a mayday call was initiated, the plane crashed into the water, all happening within the flight's phase of climbing to standard altitude. The only two occupants aboard, the captain and first officer, died in the accident. The crash was due to a lack of an established procedure for the flight crew to add engine air intake covers in adverse, windy, weather conditions.

In July 2007, a hovercraft passenger service completed a two-week trial between Portobello, Edinburgh and Kirkcaldy, Fife. The trial of the service (marketed as "Forthfast") was hailed as a major operational success, with an average passenger load of 85 per cent. It was estimated the service would decrease congestion for commuters on the Forth road and rail bridges by carrying about 870,000 passengers each year. Despite its initial success, the project was cancelled in December 2011.

In 2008, a controversial bid to allow oil transfer between ships in the firth was refused by Forth Ports. SPT Marine Services had asked permission to transfer 7.8 million tonnes of crude oil per year between tankers, but the proposals were met with determined opposition from conservation groups. In November 2008, construction of the Clackmannanshire Bridge was completed and it opened to traffic.

In 2011, construction of the Queensferry Crossing began and the bridge was formally opened on 4 September 2017.

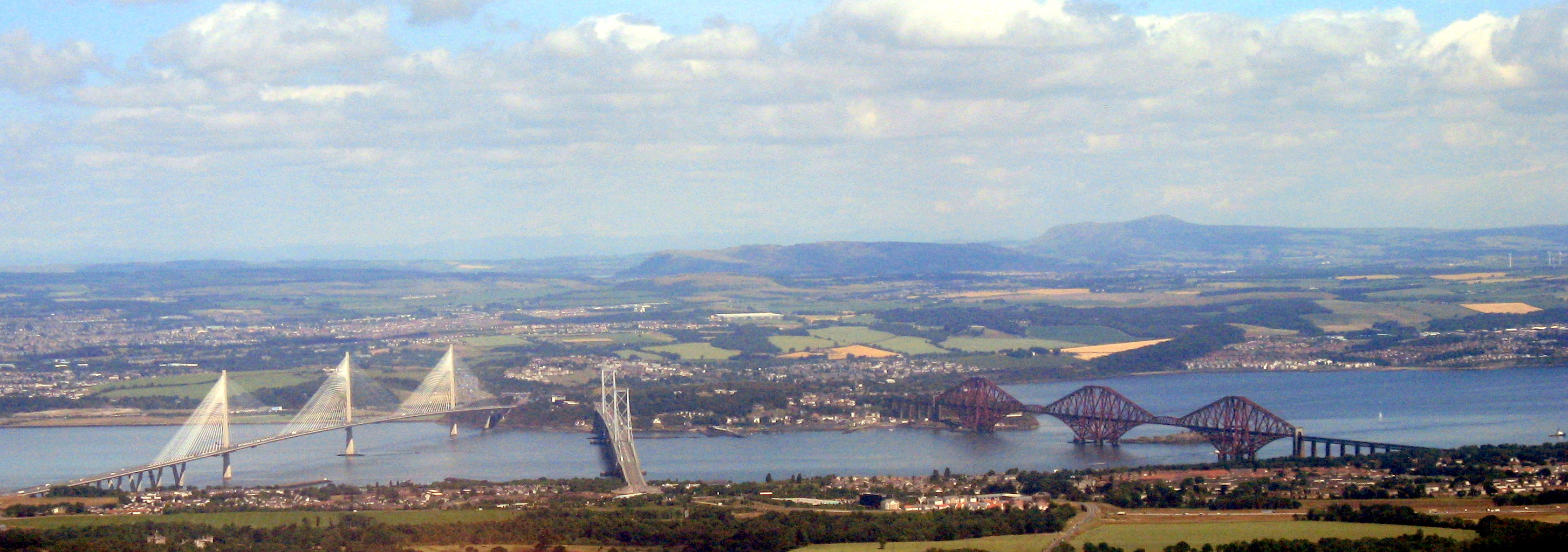
From left to right: The Queensferry Crossing, the Forth Road Bridge and the Forth Bridge from the South Queensferry side

== Ecology ==
The firth is important for nature conservation and is a Site of Special Scientific Interest. The Firth of Forth Islands SPA (Special Protection Area) is home to more than 90,000 breeding seabirds every year. There is a bird observatory on the Isle of May. Since 2014, a series of sand and gravel banks in the approaches to the firth have been designated as a Nature Conservation Marine Protected Area under the name Firth of Forth Banks Complex.

The Forth was historically home to a large native population of European oysters. However, by the 1900s, these had been fished to extinction in the Forth. A project to introduce some 30,000 oysters back in the forth has been successful at re-establishing the population in the 21st century.

== Islands ==
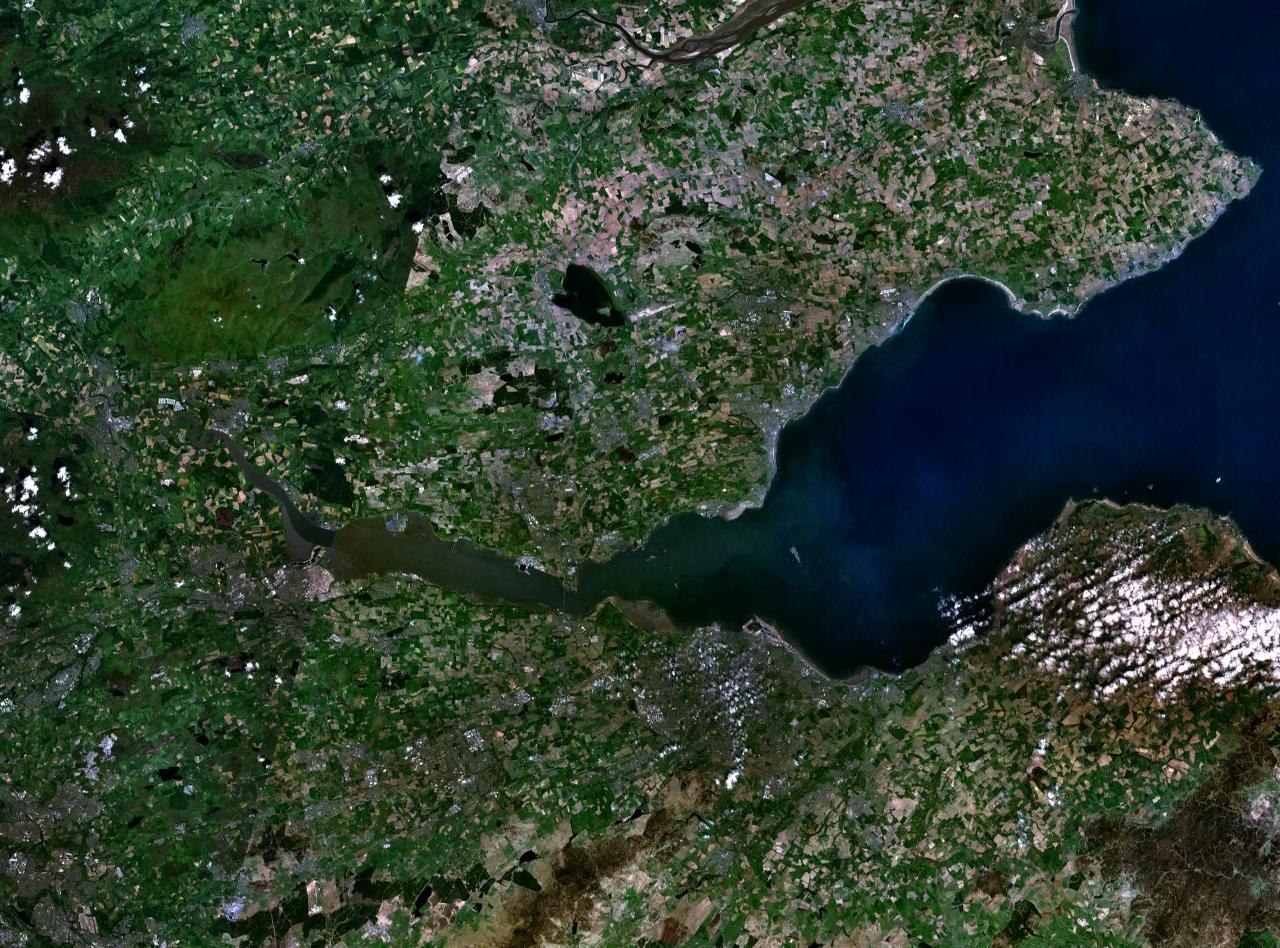
Satellite photo of the Firth and the surrounding area

- Bass Rock
- Craigleith
- Cramond
- Eyebroughy
- Fidra
- Inchcolm
- Inchgarvie
- Inchkeith
- Inchmickery with Cow and Calf
- Lamb
- Isle of May

== Shoreline settlements ==
- Lowest bridging point: Stirling

North shore

- Aberdour, Alloa, Anstruther
- Buckhaven, Burntisland
- Cellardyke, Crail
- Culross
- Charlestown, Limekilns
- Dalgety Bay, Dysart
- Earlsferry, East Wemyss, Elie
- Inverkeithing
- Kincardine, Kinghorn, Kirkcaldy
- Leven, Lower Largo
- Methil
- North Queensferry
- Pittenweem
- Rosyth
- St Monans
- West Wemyss

South shore

- Aberlady
- Blackness, Bo'ness
- Cockenzie, Cramond
- Dirleton, Dunbar, Dunglass
- Edinburgh
- Fisherrow
- Grangemouth, Granton, Gullane
- Inveresk
- Leith, Longniddry
- Musselburgh
- Newhaven, North Berwick
- Port Edgar, Portobello, Port Seton
- Prestonpans
- Seafield, South Queensferry
- Whitekirk

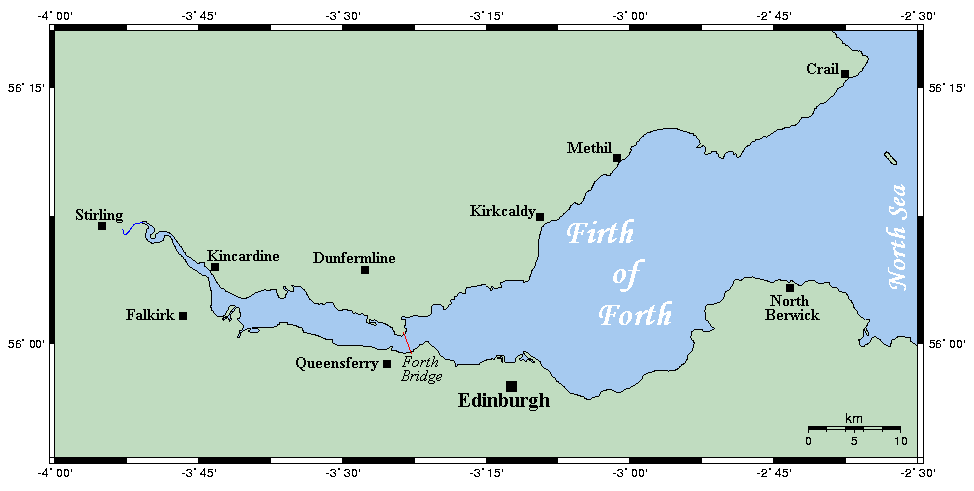
Map of the Firth

== Places of interest ==
- Aberlady Bay, River Almond, Archerfield Links
- Barns Ness Lighthouse, Bass Rock and St Baldred's chapel, Belhaven, Blackness Castle
- Caves of Caiplie, Cockenzie Harbour, Cockenzie Power Station (site of), Cramond Beach, Culross
- Dalmeny House, Dirleton Castle
- River Esk
- Fidra Lighthouse, Fisherrow Harbour
- Gosford House, Granton Harbour, Gullane Bents
- Hopetoun House, Hopetoun Monument
- John Muir Country Park, John Muir Way
- River Leven, Longniddry Bents
- Musselburgh Racecourse
- Newhaven Harbour, North Berwick Golf Club, North Berwick Law
- Portobello Beach, Port Seton Harbour, Prestongrange Industrial Heritage Museum, Preston Tower
- Ravenscraig Castle, Royal Racing Yacht Bloodhound, Royal Yacht Britannia
- Scottish Fisheries Museum, Scottish Seabird Centre, Seton Sands, St. Fillan's Cave, St. Monans Windmill
- Tantallon Castle, Torness Nuclear Power Station, River Tyne
- Waterston House
- Yellowcraigs
