= Yellowcraig =

Coastal area in East Lothian, Scotland

Coordinates: 56.063°N 2.774°W

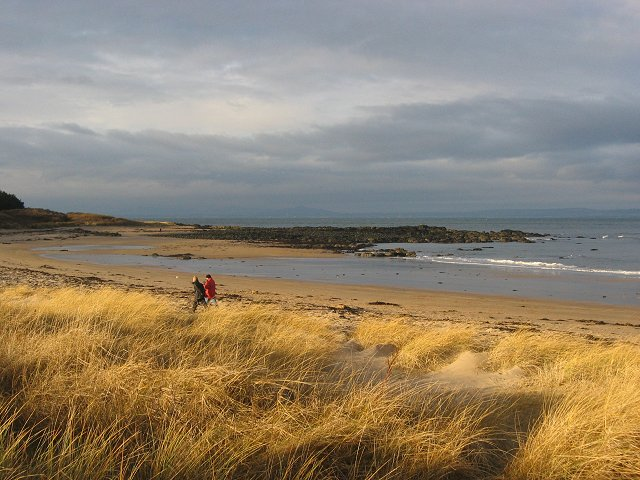
Yellowcraig, looking west

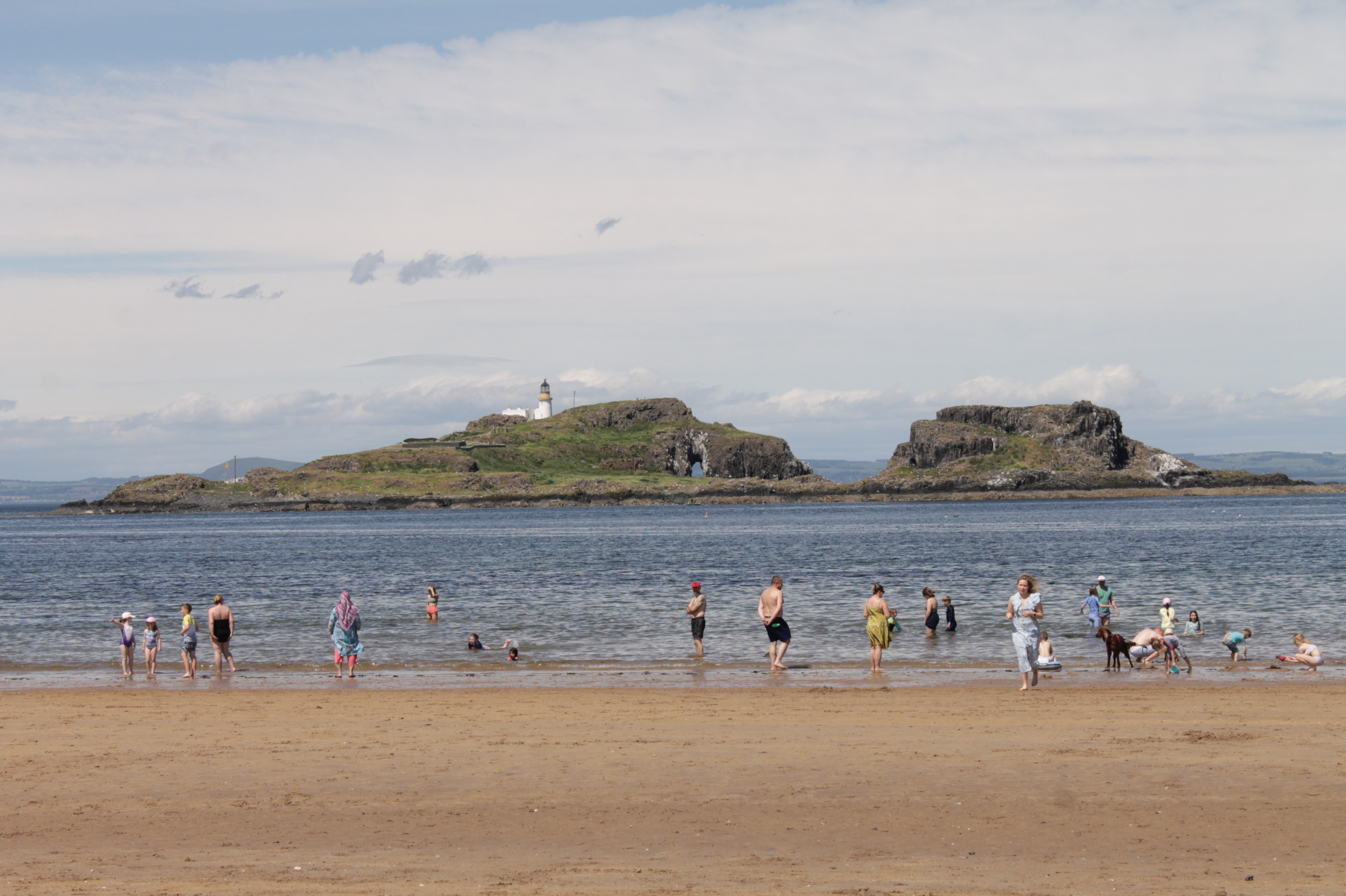
Fidra as seen from Yellowcraig beach

Yellowcraig, also known as Broad Sands Beach, is a coastal area of forest, beach and grassland in East Lothian, south-east Scotland. Yellowcraig is partly within the Firth of Forth Site of Special Scientific Interest (SSSI). It is bordered to the north by the Firth of Forth, to the south by the village of Dirleton and Dirleton Castle, to the east by the North Berwick West Links golf course, and to the west by the Archerfield Estate and Links golf courses.

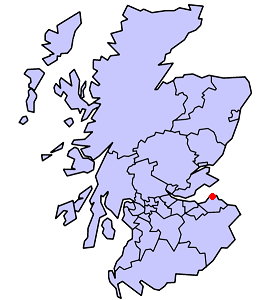
Location of Yellowcraig

Access to Yellowcraig is by the A198 coastal route through Dirleton. A visitor car park lies 270 metres (300 yd) south of the beach. The area includes information displays, a barbecue area and a Treasure Island themed adventure play park. WCs and showers are located at the car park. There is also a wheelchair accessible path and ramp giving a view over the beach.

Yellowcraig is on the John Muir Way, a 73-kilometre (45 mi) long distance footpath between Fisherrow, Musselburgh and Dunglass, named in honour of the conservationist John Muir, who was born in Dunbar. Yellowcraig is featured in the leaflet Aberlady to North Berwick among a series of leaflets on the John Muir Way. The John Muir Way is part of the North Sea Trail, a network of paths in 7 countries and 26 areas around the North Sea.

The island of Fidra, reputedly the inspiration for Robert Louis Stevenson's Treasure Island, lies just to the north-west and is an RSPB nature reserve.

The East Lothian Countryside Ranger Service co-ordinates the day-to-day management of this site.

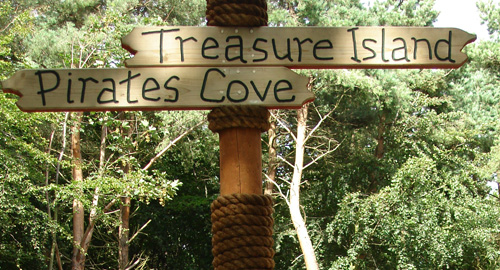
Children's play area

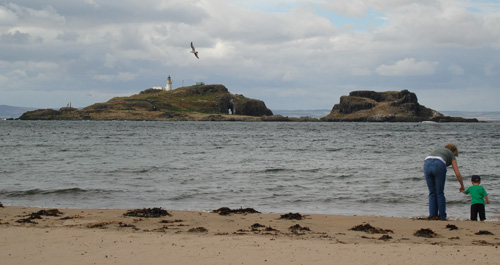
View of Fidra Island from Yellowcraig

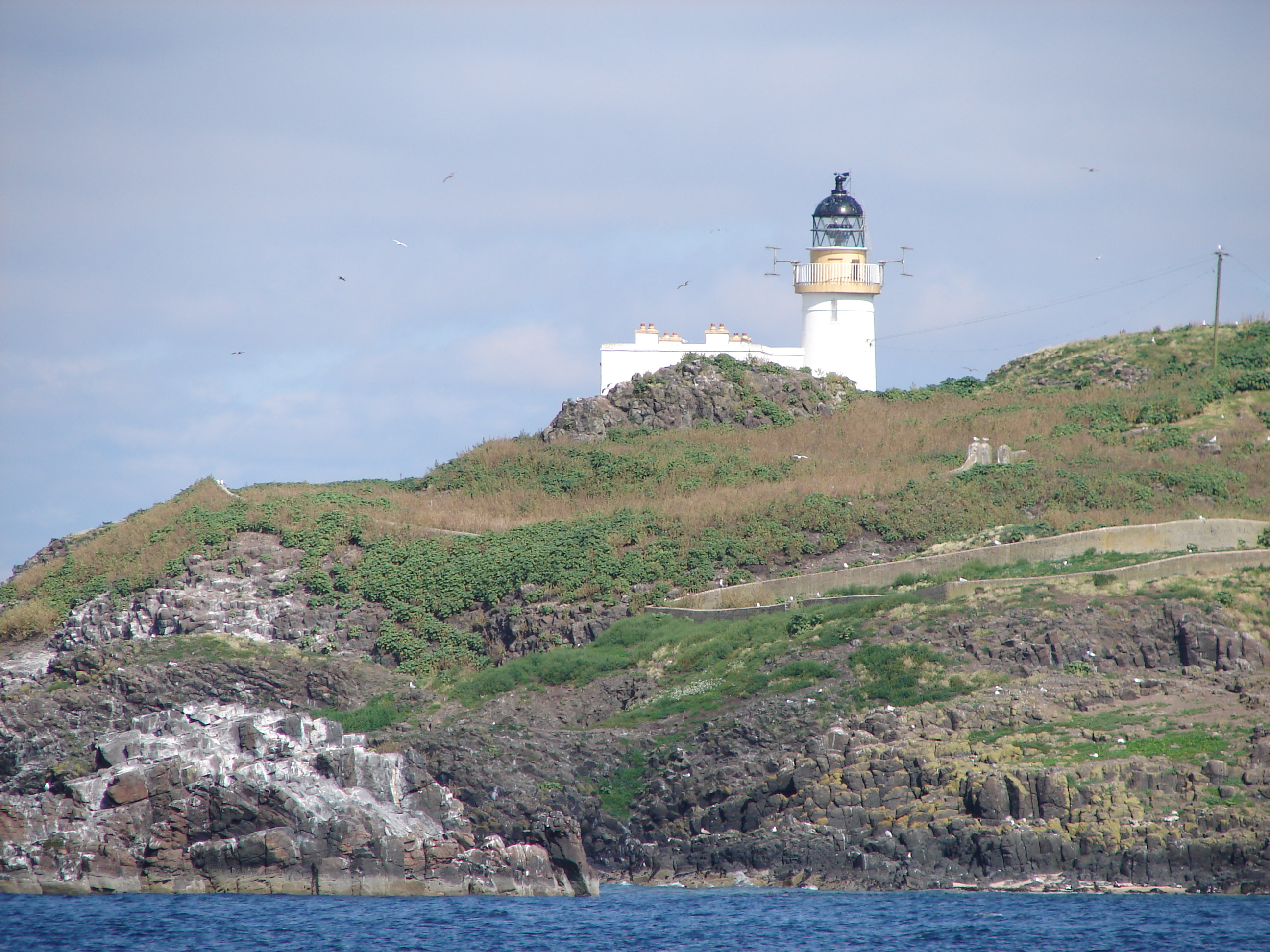
Fidra Island Lighthouse
