= Catherine Hogg Blair =

Scottish suffragette and potter (1872–1946)

Catherine Blair
- Born: Catherine Shields; 8 January 1872; Byres Farm, Bathgate, West Lothian, Scotland
- Died: 18 November 1946 (aged 74); North Berwick, Scotland
- Other names: Catherine Blair Catherine Hogg Blair
- Known for: Suffragette and founder of the Scottish Women's Rural Institute Establishing Mak'Merry Pottery Studio
- Notable work: Rural Journey: A History of the S.W.R.I. From Cradle to Majority
- Children: 4
- Parents: James Shields (father); Susan Jemima Hogg (1843-1877) Stepmother Elizabeth Hogg Bertram (sister of mother) (mother)

Catherine Hogg Blair (née Shields; 8 January 1872 – 18 November 1946) was a Scottish suffragette, magistrate, founder of the Scottish Women's Rural Institute (SWRI), and member of the Women's Social and Political Union (WSPU). Blair was a passionate campaigner and spokeswoman for rural women, dedicated to doing "all in her power to further the interests of women." In 1940, Blair's history of the Scottish Women's Rural Institute, the Rural Journey: A History of the S.W.R.I. From Cradle to Majority was published, summarising the achievements and goals of the organisation since its inception in 1917. Blair was also a skilled potter, founding Mak'Merry pottery studio at her home in the town of MacMerry, East Lothian, Scotland.

== Early life and family ==
Catherine Shields was born on 8 January 1872 in Byres Farm, Bathgate, West Lothian, to Susan Jemima Hogg and James Shields, a farmer. One of six children, Catherine attended the local grammar school, Bathgate Academy. The Shields family moved to Dolphingstone Farm, near Tranent.

Catherine met and married Thomas Blair, a farmer, in 1894. The couple moved to Hoprig Mains Farm, near Gladsmuir, East Lothian and had four children.

== Support of suffrage ==
Blair was an active member of the Women's Social and Political Union (WSPU), chaired local meetings and wrote to the local press. Although she was an ardent defender of militancy, she did not participate in militant protests herself because of her young family. She established her farm as a clandestine refuge for Scottish suffragettes who had been released from prison under licence as a result of the Cat and Mouse Act, such as Edith Hudson. Her husband, Thomas Blair, was supportive, resigning his vice-presidency of the local Liberal party because of the government's treatment of the suffrage question. Cathrine was a friend of a fellow suffragette, Nannie Brown, who also worked on the Scottish Women's Rural Institutes.

During the 1911 census, to protest that she would only be recorded as the "wife" of Thomas Blair, Blair moved herself and her children to a nearby barn so that the census form would need to show her as a person in her own right. Blair's actions were part of a wider boycott of the 1911 census, enacted by suffrage organisations.

In 1913 The Prisoners (Temporary Discharge for Ill Health) Act 1913 was passed, commonly known as the "Cat & Mouse Act". The consequence of this act was that women were not force fed if they went on hunger strike in prison. Those that went on hunger strike were realised if their health became critical but were required to return when they had recovered. Blair supported some of these women on her farm including allowing them to hide from the authorities.

== Scottish Women's Rural Institute ==
In 1917, Blair identified the need for a Scottish example of the emerging Women's Institutes movement and consequently founded the Scottish Women's Rural Institute. The first SWRI meeting was held in Longniddry, East Lothian, and Madge Watt was there from Canada – 37 women became members. The SWRI created the chance for rural women to forge new social networks and share skills with one another; something Blair was passionate about understanding the obligatory ties women had to their home lives.

Blair had suggested from its inception that the Scottish Women's Rural Institute should not "confine themselves to matters of a purely domestic character." Instead, she envisaged that the organisation would provide countrywomen with an opportunity to voice their concerns over life in rural areas, with housing being a "prominent talking point." Moreover, she suggested that the "future life of their country depended on agricultural development" and in turn, this depended "very largely" on better housing and social conditions. Although the SWRI claimed to maintain a non-political stance, Blair channelled her belief in female equality into the organisation, agitating members to challenge the status quo regarding the poor rural housing conditions.

Catherine was involved in the 1919 Memorandum on Rural Housing, commissioned by the Scottish Board of Agriculture, which sought to gather women's housing experiences throughout rural Scotland. The Board encouraged ordinary members of the Scottish Women's Rural Institute to work out and express what their housing requirements and priorities were. She was also appointed by Secretary of State for Scotland Robert Munro to the Local Government Board's 1918 Women's Committee on planning houses for the working classes chaired by Helen Kerr.

Catherine established the Mak'Merry poetry studio at her home of Hoprig Mains Farm in 1919. The pottery studio was affiliated with the Scottish Women's Rural Institutes and was set up as a women's cooperative to provide employment and income for poorer women. The appeal of Mak'Merry pottery was far-reaching, becoming "a feature of many a rural show," with Queen Elizabeth the Queen Mother ordering Mak’Merry crockery at the 1933 Royal Highland Show. Upon Catherine's death in 1946, it was noted in her obituary that there was an established market for her pottery in America. She also helped set up the Lothian Home Arts Guild of Craftswomen.

== Later life and legacy ==
In 1921 Blair became a magistrate. She died in North Berwick on 18 November 1946, aged 74.

In 2021, Catherine Hogg Blair was featured on a pack of 'Scotland's Suffragette Trumps' playing cards, which were distributed as part of an education pack to 100 Scottish schools by the group Protests and Suffragettes.

== See also ==
- Women's suffrage in the United Kingdom
- Scottish Women's Rural Institutes
