= Scottish Women's Institutes =

Scottish Women's Institutes (SWI) is a Scottish member-led organisation which is informally called "the Rural", after its original name Scottish Women's Rural Institutes. It was launched in June 1917 by Catherine Blair, a suffragette and advocate for rural women, to enable women in rural areas of the country to socialise, learn new crafting skills, and make money from items they made rather than rely on their men bringing home a wage.

== Activities ==
Education and friendship remain at the heart of the organisation today. The National body offers members volunteering opportunities at outreach events such as the Royal Highland Show, the chance to compete in National sporting and crafting competitions, and a range of online Skill Share Sessions and Expert Talks which are available on the YouTube channel ScottishWomen'sInstitutesTV.

The SWI is now a SCIO registered charity which promotes the preservation of Scotland's traditions and rural heritage, particularly in the sphere of household activities such as crafts, cooking and baking. Each group has its own programme of events, learning opportunities and talks, so no two Institutes are the same and activities are as varied as belly dancing, gin tasting and segway riding.

The National body of the SWI has Federations in most Scottish council areas and each Federation has Institutes which offer meeting points for local groups of women which meet regularly throughout the country. There are around 10,000 members, making it one of Scotland's leading membership organisations and members decide on all aspects of the organisation with an all-female Board of Trustees having the final say.

== History ==
It was formed on 26 June 1917 as the Scottish Women's Rural Institutes, part of the movement of rural women's institutes started in Stoney Creek, Ontario in 1897. The first meeting in Scotland took place at Longniddry in East Lothian. Catherine Hogg Blair had identified the need for a Scottish example of the emerging Women's Institutes movement and she organised the meeting at Longniddry to avoid a measles outbreak in her own village. 37 women became members and campaigner Nannie Brown was the area organiser. The SWRI created the chance for rural women to network and share their skills with one another.

The group's magazine Scottish Home and Country was first published in 1924 and changed its name to Women Together in 2018, see issuu.com.

The name changed to Scottish Women's Institutes in 2015.
