= Longniddry Bents =

Beach in East Lothian, Scotland

Coordinates: 55.98047°N 2.90838°W

Longniddry Bents is a beach just north of Longniddry in East Lothian, Scotland. The beach is almost 2 miles in length, which includes Gosford Bay to the east side, and the rockier Seton Sands to the west. Along the beach are the remains of a wall of concrete tank traps erected during World War II as protection from any attempted German invasion. Many of these are now hidden in the surrounding sea-grass and sea buckthorn bushes.

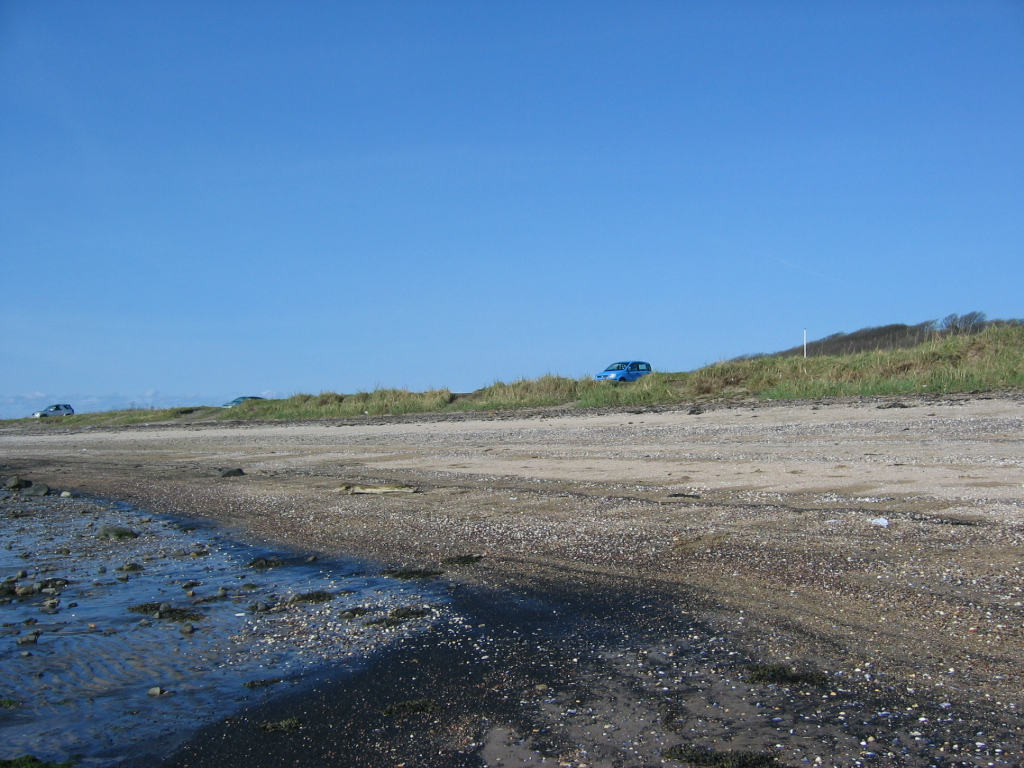
Longniddry Bents

The area is popular, mostly in the summer months, with local families, holidaymakers, picnickers, horseriders, ramblers, metal detectors, dogwalkers and the occasional kite buggy. The shallow bay is a popular watersports location for windsurfers, kitesurfers and sea kayaks.

Many sea and wading birds frequent the area making it a regular haven for bird-watchers. A small community of rare water voles are known to reside around the several burns running out of the bents. Grey seals are often spotted to the west of the bay.

The area is part of the Firth of Forth Site of Special Scientific Interest, a Special Protection Area and Ramsar Site.

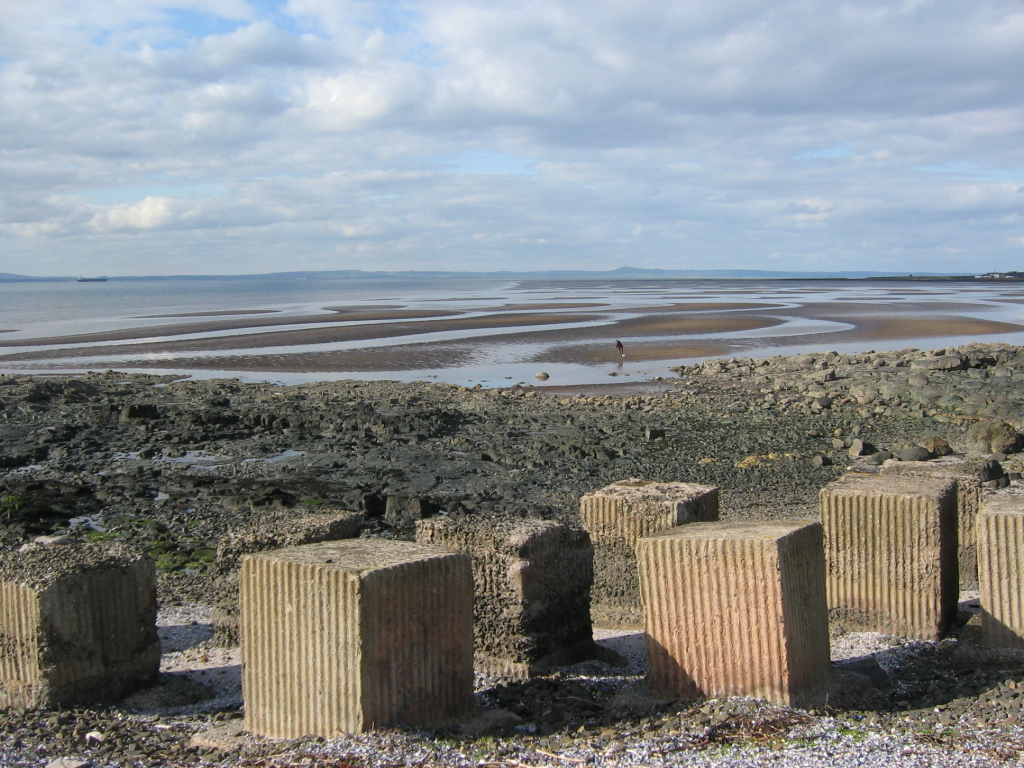
Longniddry tanktraps

There are three car-parking areas, and the largest (No. 3) has good views west across the bay to Edinburgh's skyline and the Forth Bridge and Forth Road Bridge. Overnight parking is prohibited.

Close to car park No.3 is Gosford House, and one of its two listed 18th century lodges can be seen on the main road.

Longniddry Bents are part of the John Muir Way coastal walk and were presented with a Seaside Award (Rural) in 2006.

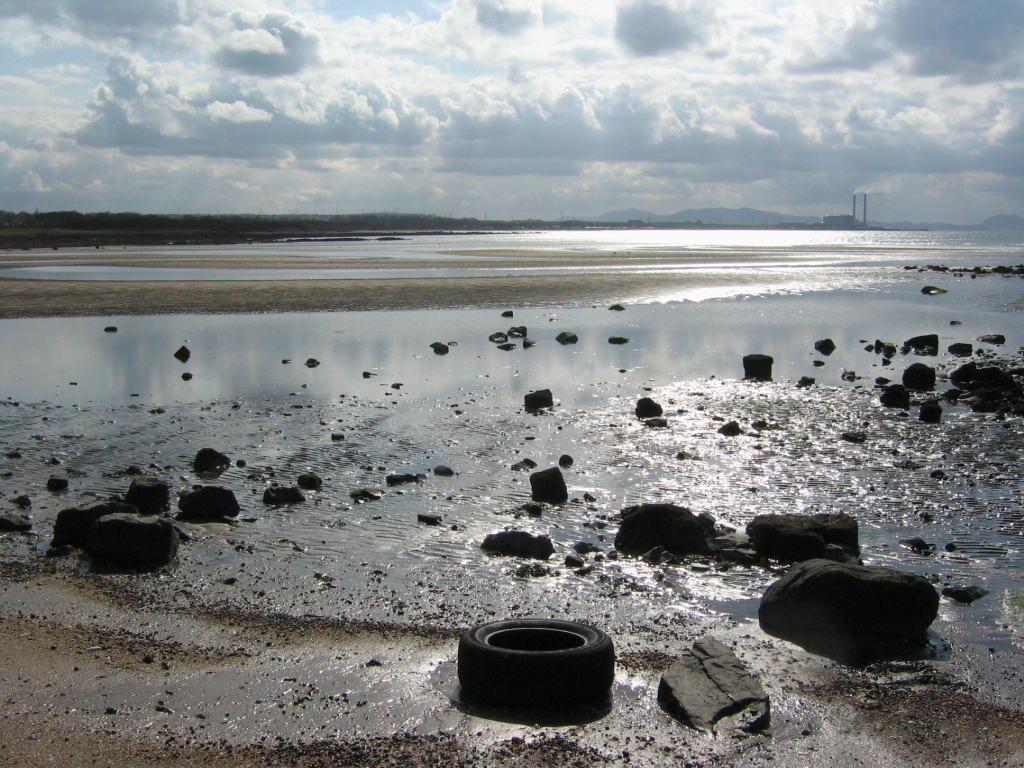
Longniddry Bents

In the East Lothian Council-produced series of leaflets on the John Muir Way, Longniddry is included in the leaflet "Cockenzie to Aberlady". The John Muir way is also part of the North Sea Trail of seven nations and 26 areas around the North Sea.

== See also ==
- Longniddry Primary School
- Longniddry railway station
- List of places in East Lothian
- Bents, Saskatchewan a ghost town named after Longniddry Bents
