= Seton Sands =

Coordinates: 55.97533°N 2.92425°W

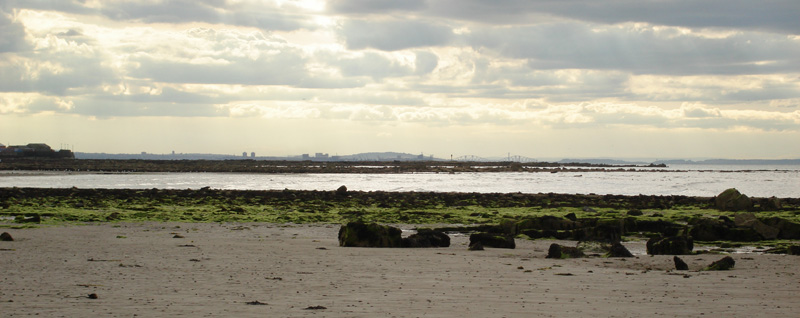
Seton Sands with Edinburgh in the distance

Seton Sands is a rocky beach to the east of Port Seton, East Lothian, Scotland. It is situated at the western end of Longniddry Bents and is part of the John Muir Way coastal walk.

Low tide reveals many rock pools, then a flat sandy bed to the north which runs about 200 yards out to meet the Firth of Forth.

South of the beach there is Seton Sands Holiday Park, a popular holiday destination in the summer months for many visitors, mostly families from the west coast of Scotland and the north of England.

At the western edge of the caravan park is a public footpath leading to the Historic Scotland property Seton Collegiate Church, referred to locally as Seton Chapel.

A regular bus service to Edinburgh terminates at Seton Sands (Lothian Buses no.26).

== See also ==
- List of places in East Lothian
