= North Berwick West Links =

Golf course in North Berwick, Scotland

Coordinates: 56.0586°N 2.7554°W

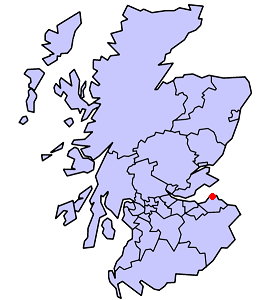
North Berwick, East Lothian

The West Links is a golf course in North Berwick, Scotland. It is the more renowned of two courses in the town. It has held various championships and has been used as a qualifying venue when The Open Championship has been held at Muirfield (most recently 2013). It was opened in 1832.

== History ==
The area which is home to the course today — a strip of land adjacent to the beach and extending westward over 2 miles from the edge of the town centre to the nature reserve at Yellowcraigs — has been used for golf for at least 400 years, although early participants were not welcomed by local landowners or authorities. The course was officially opened in 1832 with six holes, so that competitions had to be played over three rounds. After a period of expansion which began in 1868, the course featured 18 holes by 1877 and was extended to a "full length" of 6095 yards in 1895. The last major alteration to the course was masterminded by Ben Sayers in 1932, since when the layout of the course has hardly changed. Today the course measures 6,420 yards. In 2025, the West Links hosted the Scottish Men's Open Championship. It is owned by East Lothian Council.

== Clubs ==
Four golf clubs are based at the West Links: the North Berwick Golf Club (founded 1832), Tantallon Golf Club (1853), Bass Rock Golf Club (1873) and the North Berwick Ladies Golf Club (1888). The North Berwick Golf Club is the 13th oldest club in the world, and only St Andrews has a club which has continuously played over the same course for longer.

The North Berwick Golf Club and the Tantallon Golf Club both maintain clubhouses, the former with the prime location off the 18th green and the latter just over the road. Both clubhouses have changing rooms and dining facilities.

At the far end of the course there is a practice area within the loop created by the 8th, 9th, 10th and 11th holes. The area features a driving or iron play field (no automatic ball retrieval) and a multi-hole putting green.

== Holes ==
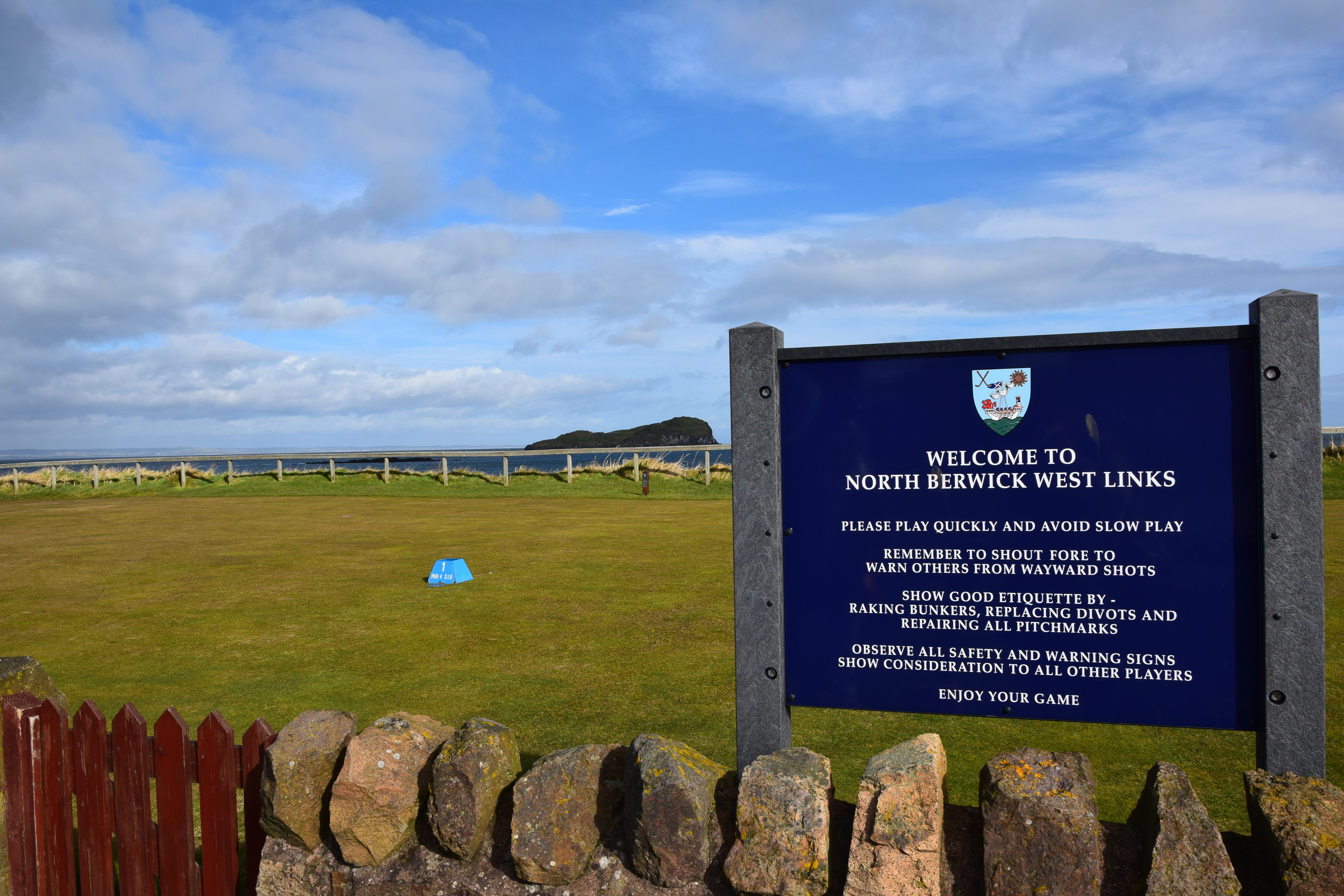
North Berwick West Links

Its signature hole is thought by many to be the 15th, "Redan", a par-3 which starts with a blind tee-shot over a valley towards the green which is perched on a hill beyond and tilted away and to the left. The design of the hole has been copied on several newer courses around the world, particularly in Japan. One of the earliest copies of the Redan hole is the 7th at Shinnecock Hills, famous for the trouble it caused players during the 2004 U.S. Open. The Redan at North Berwick is preceded (see map) by a heroic stretch of three holes:

- the 12th hole "Bass" which requires a knowledgeable tee shot in order to afford the best angle into the green,
- the 13th hole "Pit" where an ancient stone wall fronts a relatively small green, and
- the blind-approach 14th hole "Perfection" which can yield a wide range of scores even in ideal conditions.

The 16th hole "Gate" features a divided green, with two raised surfaces divided by a punishing valley, a rare feature in the golfing world because modern architects are afraid to propose such a hole to golf course developers.
