= Biel Water =

River in Biel, East Lothian, Scotland

Coordinates: 55.97357°N 2.60507°W

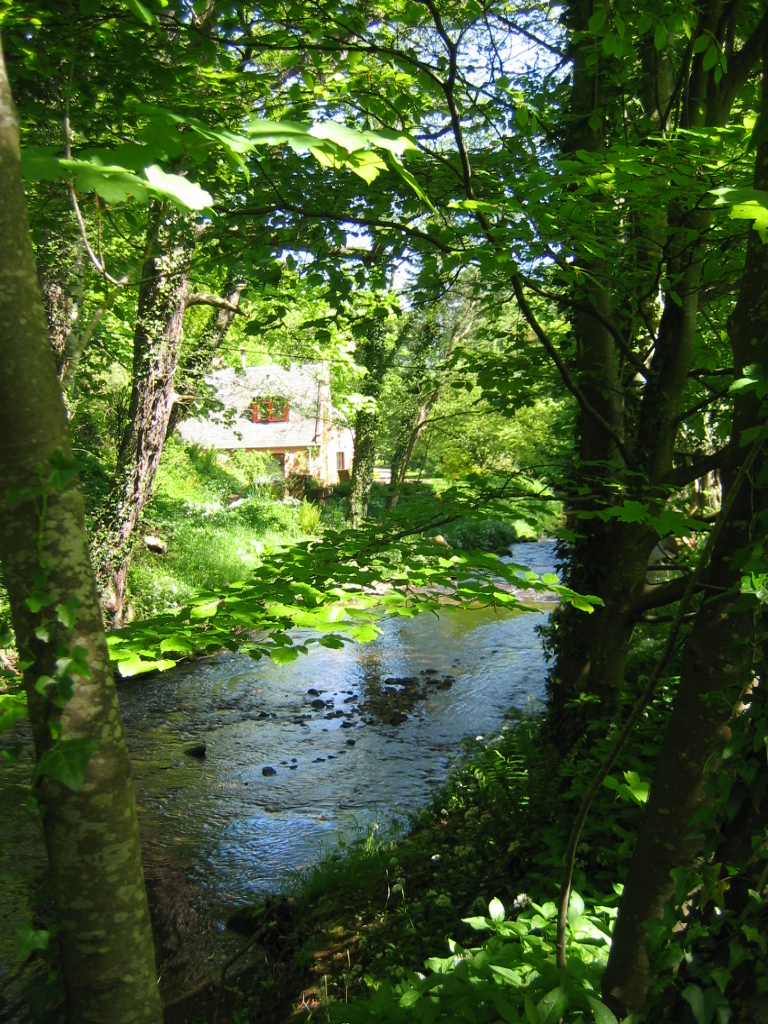
Biel Mill on the Biel Water

The Biel Water is a river running through the Biel Estate in Biel, East Lothian. It runs for 4.5 kilometres from the Luggate Burn and the Whittinghame Water, via Stenton, Biel House, West Barns, and finally to Belhaven Bay with its rather unusual bridge, whose ends are submerged at high tide.

== See also ==
- Stenton
- List of places in East Lothian

== Photo gallery ==
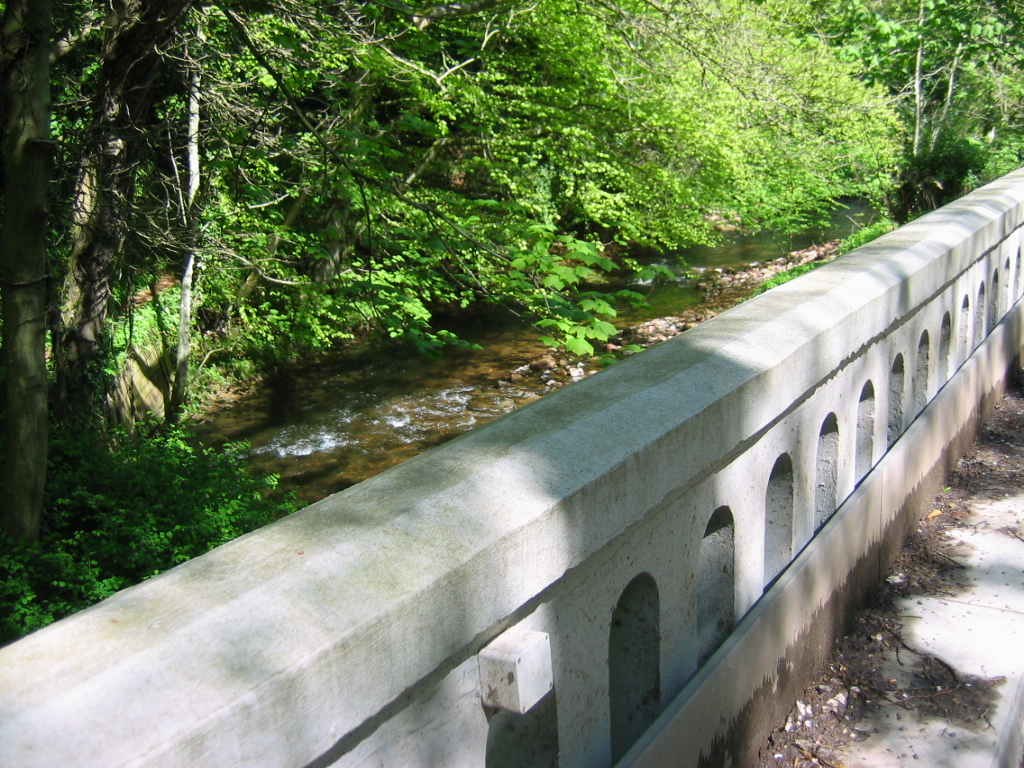
New crossing at Biel Water, flood relief

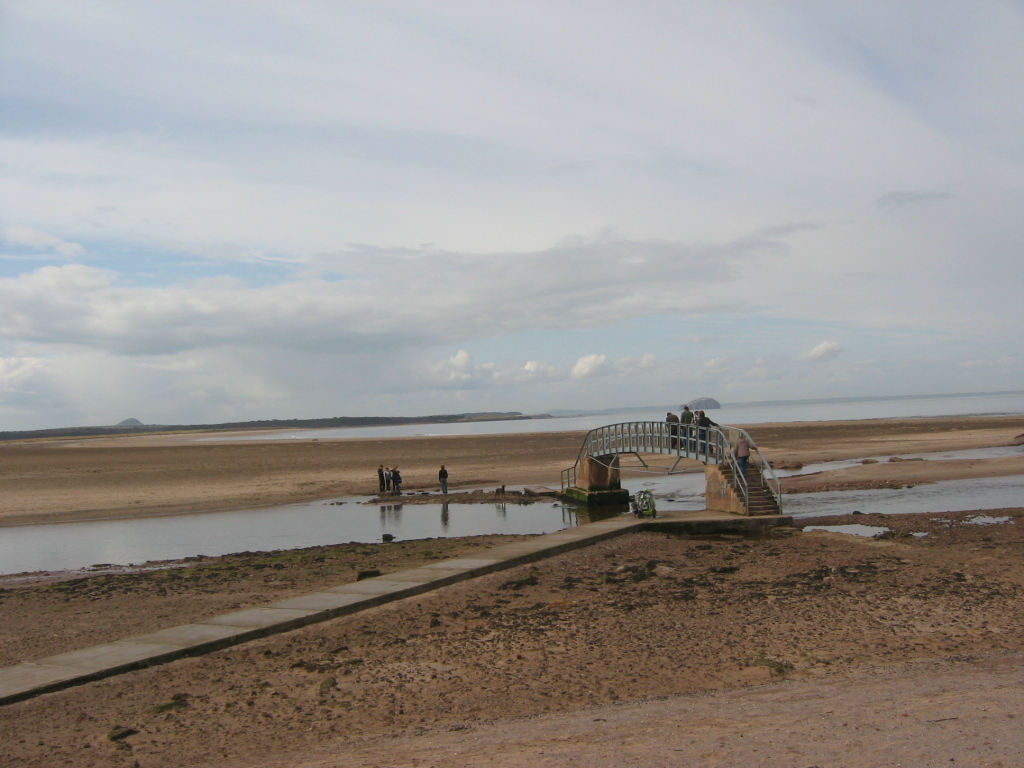
The Bridge at Biel Water, Belhaven

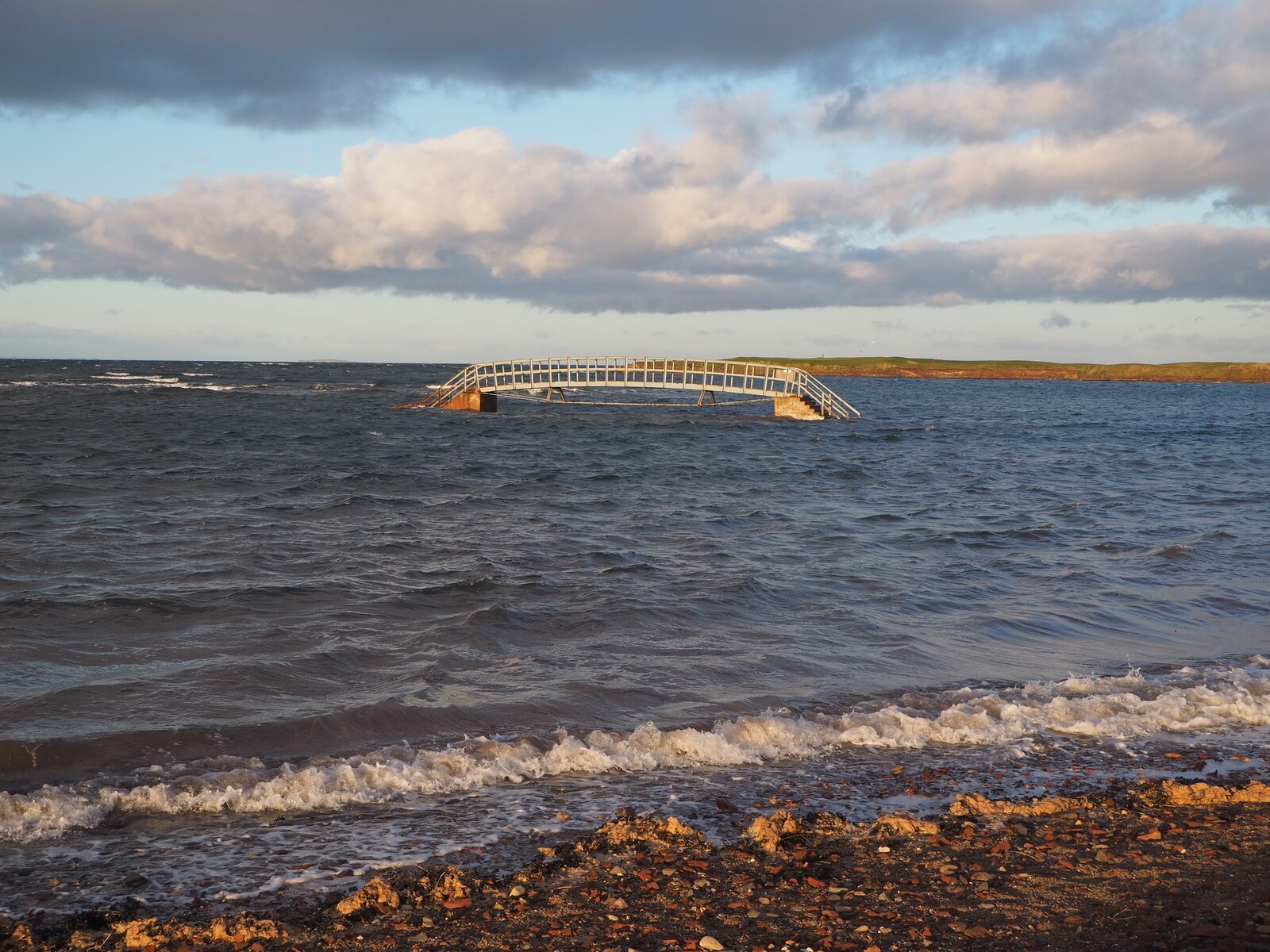
The bridge at high tide
