= Belhaven, Scotland =

Village in East Lothian, Scotland

Coordinates: 55.998°N 2.536°W

Belhaven: Scottish Gaelic: Beul na h-aibhne
- An aerial view of Belhaven
- Location within Scotland
- OS grid reference: NT665784
- Civil parish: Dunbar
- Council area: East Lothian Council
- Lieutenancy area: East Lothian
- Country: Scotland
- Sovereign state: United Kingdom
- Post town: DUNBAR
- Postcode district: EH42
- Dialling code: 01368
- Police: Scotland
- Fire: Scottish
- Ambulance: Scottish
- UK Parliament: East Lothian
- Scottish Parliament: East Lothian

Belhaven (Scottish Gaelic: Beul na h-aibhne, meaning mouth of the river) is a village in East Lothian, Scotland, and was originally the ancient port of Dunbar of which town the village has always been a part. Belhaven takes its name from its situation at the mouth of the Biel Water. The village is home to Belhaven Hill School, an independent co-educational prep school for children between the ages of 7–13.

== History ==
Belhaven originated as a subsidiary settlement of the burgh of Dunbar and was first mentioned in the 12th century as the site of the port of Dunbar and that the village had been divided into crofts and tenements. It continued to be the port of Dunbar into the sixteenth century, when new works at Dunbar replaced it. The physical traces of Belhaven's once substantial breakwater and pier were removed by quarrying and recycling. The location of Belhaven and its distance from Dunbar, with the now drained Belhaven Loch giving a plentiful supply of water, meant that a leather tanning industry developed. In addition, many of the villagers grew enough fruit and vegetables to trade in Dunbar. The readily available water also allowed brewing to develop. The first brewers in the area were said to be the monks from the monastery on the Isle of May who had been granted land in the area.

In 1901 a hospital, the Dunbar Combination Hospital, was opened to the south of Belhaven and it continues as a community hospital and a nursing home today, on the same site. The outline of Belhaven has remained largely unchanged for the last 200 years and its street plan is still similar to what it was two centuries ago, although some streets are longer. Six sizeable houses on the edge of the village defined its perimeters and these large properties, set in their own grounds, prevented Dunbar from expanding to join Belhaven, except for a small area in the south eastern corner. Most of the village is within a Conservation Area and many of the older buildings are listed. Winterfield was the home of Captain R. Anderson of the Royal Navy.

== Industry ==
In 1806 a spinning mill was erected at Belhaven but closed after a relatively short time of operations. In 1815 a factory for cotton goods was established in the former artillery barracks opposite Winterfield Park, which had been purchased from the government. It gave employment to 250 looms and 550 people, many of whom were Irish immigrants. This industry also closed following the collapse of the East Lothian Bank (1823).

== Brewery ==
Belhaven Brewery is owned by Greene King. The brewery produces Belhaven Best ale and several other beers.

== Surf Centre ==
Opened in 2020 as a charitable organisation the Centre provides space for community organisations and surf club.

== See also ==
- List of places in East Lothian
- List of places in Scotland
