= Longniddry =

Village in East Lothian, Scotland

Coordinates: 55.975°N 2.894°W

Longniddry: Scottish Gaelic: Nuadh-Treabh Fada; Scots: Langniddry
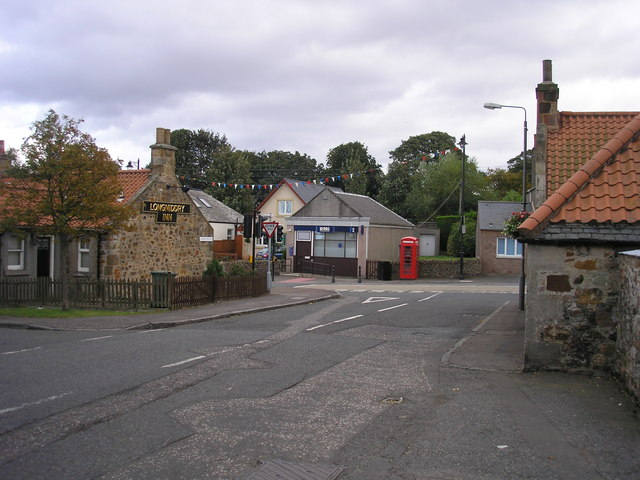
- Links Road, Longniddry

- Location within East Lothian
- Population: 2,340 (2020)
- OS grid reference: NT442761
  - Edinburgh: 11.5 mi (18.5 km)
  - London: 329 mi (529 km)
- Civil parish: Gladsmuir
- Council area: East Lothian
- Lieutenancy area: East Lothian
- Country: Scotland
- Sovereign state: United Kingdom
- Post town: LONGNIDDRY
- Postcode district: EH32
- Dialling code: 01875
- Police: Scotland
- Fire: Scottish
- Ambulance: Scottish
- UK Parliament: East Lothian
- Scottish Parliament: East Lothian

Longniddry (Scots: Langniddry, Scottish Gaelic: Nuadh-Treabh Fada) is a coastal village in East Lothian, Scotland, with an estimated population of 2,340 in 2020. The Scottish Women's Rural Institute was founded here in 1917.

== Features ==
Longniddry is primarily a dormitory village for commuters, with good transport links by road and rail (Longniddry railway station is on the North Berwick Line) to Edinburgh, some 12 miles to the West. The village has a number of local, community based resources including local shops and Longniddry Community Centre, which also houses the library. Near to the library is the Scout Hall used by the Longniddry Scout Group. The golf course hosted the Carling-Caledonian Tournament in 1961. Like many coastal towns in East Lothian, Longniddry has a sandy beach beside the golf course. This stretch of local coastline is lined with dunes and known as Longniddry Bents.

== History ==
The 18th century Gosford House, which is the seat of the Earl of Wemyss and March, stands on the eastern edge of the village.

In 1917 the first meeting of the Scottish Women's Rural Institute took place in Longniddry organised by Catherine Hogg Blair. 37 women became members.

In 2006, Longniddry and the neighbouring towns of Prestonpans, Cockenzie and Port Seton were twinned with the town of Barga, Tuscany, Italy.

A major extension to the village was built in the 2020s, designed by Ben Pentreath.

== Notable people ==
- John Knox, main figure in the Scottish Reformation and disciple of John Calvin was tutor to the sons of the Douglas family who lived at the west side of the village
- George Douglas of Longniddry, Scottish courtier
- Sir Norman Graham, head of Scottish Education Department
- Hugh MacDiarmid, the Scottish poet, lived in Longniddry for a short while
- James Bond actor Pierce Brosnan lived in Longniddry from August 1964 with his mother and new stepfather William Carmichael before moving to London
- Mollie Hunter, winner of the 1974 Carnegie Medal for outstanding books for children

== See also ==
- Longniddry Bents
- Longniddry Primary School
- Longniddry railway station
- List of places in East Lothian
