= Bilsdean =

Coordinates: 55.946°N 2.381°W

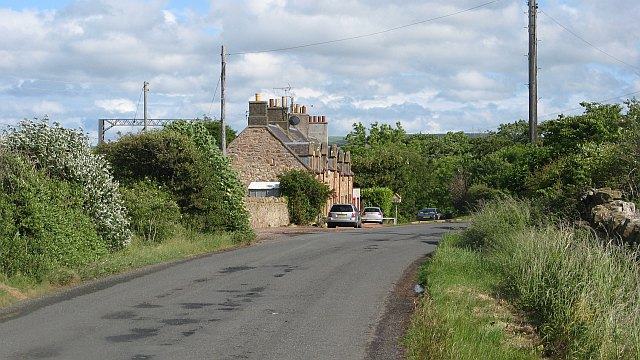
- Approaching Bilsdean along the old A1 road

- Location within Scotland
- OS grid reference: NT761725
- Civil parish: Oldhamstocks
- Council area: East Lothian Council
- Lieutenancy area: East Lothian
- Country: Scotland
- Sovereign state: United Kingdom
- Post town: COCKBURNSPATH
- Postcode district: TD13
- Dialling code: 01368
- Police: Scotland
- Fire: Scottish
- Ambulance: Scottish
- UK Parliament: East Lothian
- Scottish Parliament: East Lothian

Bilsdean is a village between Thorntonloch and Cockburnspath on the East Lothian coast of Scotland.

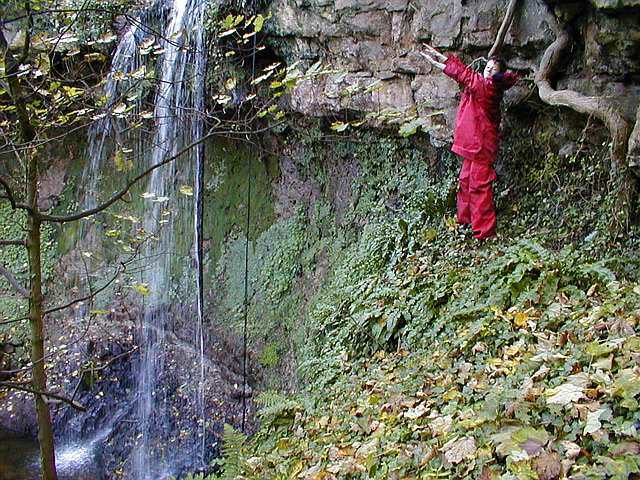
Bilsdean Glen

== See also ==
- List of places in East Lothian
