= East Lothian =

Council area of Scotland

East Lothian: Lodainn an Ear (Scottish Gaelic); Aest Lowden (Scots); Haddingtonshire
- Lieutenancy and council area
- East Lothian shown within Scotland

- Coat of arms Flag of East Lothian, registered in 2018

- Detail of East Lothian
- Coordinates: 55°55′N 2°45′W
- Sovereign state: United Kingdom
- Country: Scotland
- Unitary authority: 1 April 1996
- Administrative HQ: Haddington Town House

Government
  - Type: Council
  - Body: East Lothian Council
  - Control: No overall control
  - MPs: 2 MPs: Douglas Alexander (L); Chris Murray (L)
  - MSPs: 2 MSPs: Colin Beattie (SNP); Paul McLennan (SNP)

Area
  - Total: 262 sq mi (679 km^{2})
  - Rank: 18th

Population (2025)
  - Total: 116,460
  - Rank: 18th
  - Density: 440/sq mi (171/km^{2})
- Time zone: UTC+0 (GMT)
  - Summer (DST): UTC+1 (BST)
- ISO 3166 code: GB-ELN
- GSS code: S12000010
- Website: eastlothian.gov.uk

East Lothian (/ˈloʊðiən/; Scots: Aest Lowden; Scottish Gaelic: Lodainn an Ear) is one of the 32 council areas of Scotland, as well as an historic county, registration county and lieutenancy area. The county was called Haddingtonshire until 1921.

In 1975, the historic county was incorporated for local government purposes into Lothian Region as East Lothian District, with some slight alterations of its boundaries. The Local Government etc. (Scotland) Act 1994 later created East Lothian as one of 32 modern council areas. East Lothian lies south of the Firth of Forth in the eastern central Lowlands of Scotland. It borders Edinburgh to the west, Midlothian to the south-west and the Scottish Borders to the south. Its administrative centre and former county town is Haddington while the largest town is Musselburgh.

Haddingtonshire has ancient origins and is named in a charter of 1139 as Hadintunschira and in another of 1141 as Hadintunshire. Three of the county's towns were designated as royal burghs: Haddington, Dunbar, and North Berwick.

As with the rest of Lothian, it formed part of the Anglo-Saxon kingdom of Bernicia and later the Kingdom of Northumbria. Popular legend suggests that it was at a battle between the Picts and Angles in the East Lothian village of Athelstaneford in 823 that the flag of Scotland was conceived. From the 10th century, Lothian transferred from the Kingdom of England to the authority of the monarchs of Scotland. It was a cross-point in battles between England and Scotland and later the site of a significant Jacobite victory against Government forces in the Battle of Prestonpans. In the 19th century, the county is mentioned in the Gazetteer for Scotland as chiefly agricultural, with farming, fishing and coal-mining forming significant parts of the local economy.

== History ==
=== Early history ===
Following the end of the Roman occupation of Britain, Lothian was populated by Brythonic-speaking Ancient Britons and formed part of the kingdom of the Gododdin, within the Hen Ogledd or Old North. In the 7th century, all of the Gododdin's territory fell to the Angles, with Lothian becoming part of the kingdom of Bernicia.

Bernicia united into the Kingdom of Northumbria which itself became part of the early Kingdom of England. Lothian came under the control of the Scottish monarchy in the 10th century.

The earliest reference to the shire of Haddington, or Haddingtonshire, occurred in the 12th century, in two charters issued by King David. The shire covered the eastern part of Lothian.

=== Medieval and early modern period ===
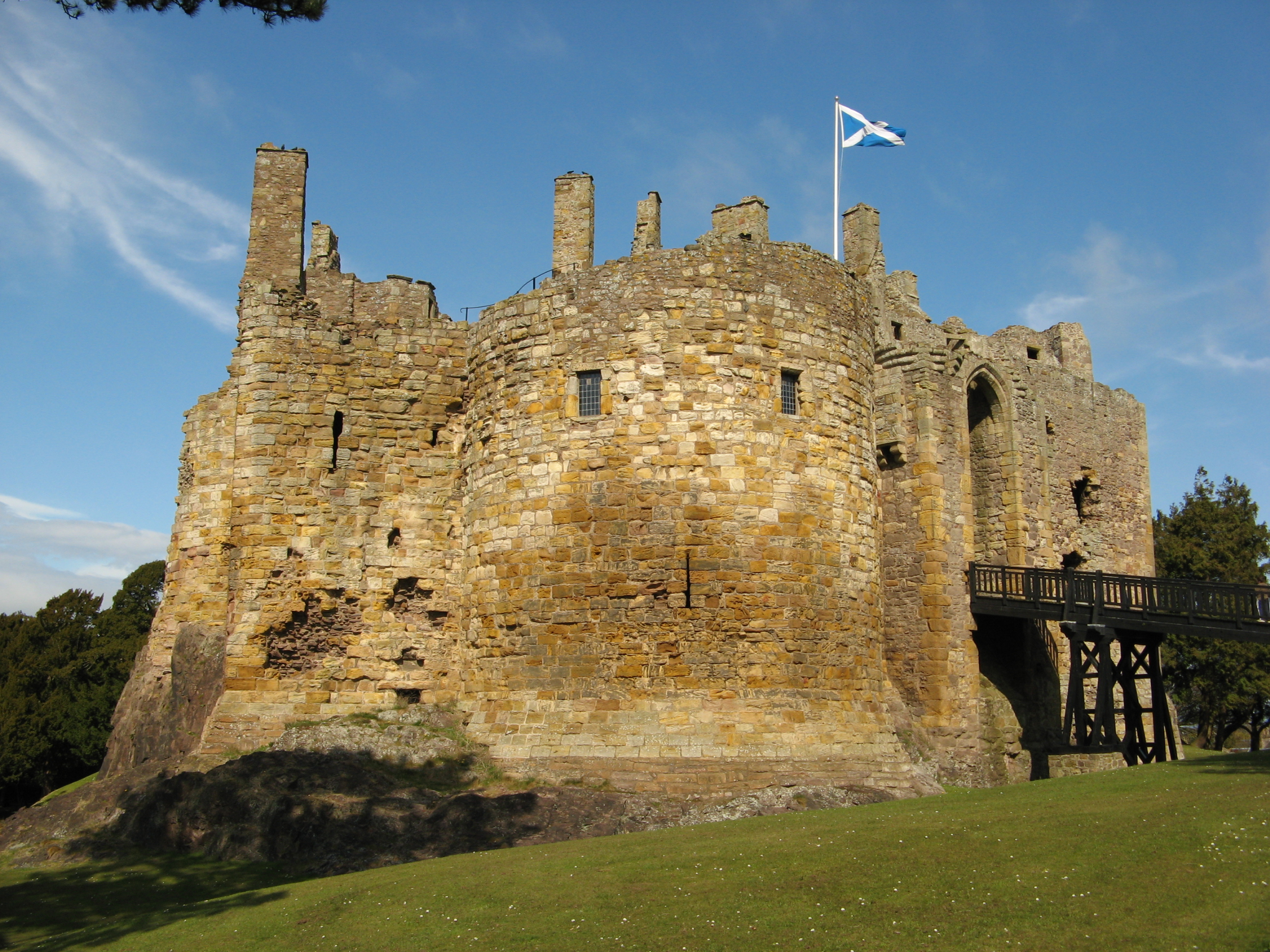
Dirleton Castle

Haddingtonshire was heavily involved in several medieval and early modern conflicts and several fortified castles and buildings such as Dunbar Castle, Tantallon Castle and Dirleton Castle date from this period.

In the 12th and 13th centuries, the Palace of Haddington was one of the seats of the Kings of Scotland. King William the Lion of Scotland used the palace from time to time and it was the birthplace of Alexander II in 1198. The palace and town were burned and pillaged in 1216, by an English army under the command of King John of England. In 1296, the Battle of Dunbar was a decisive victory for the forces of Edward I of England against the forces of John Balliol, the Scottish king who was Edward's vassal.

Haddingtonshire was also the site of conflict during the war of the Rough Wooing, with many houses and villages burnt by the English in May 1544 after the sacking of Edinburgh, the Scottish defeat at the battle of Pinkie, Dunbar Castle burnt in 1548, and the siege of Haddington. Haddingtonshire lairds supported the English cause, including John Cockburn of Ormiston, Alexander Crichton of Brunstane, and Regent Arran demolished their houses.

During the War of the Three Kingdoms, another Battle of Dunbar took place in 1650 between Scottish Covenanter forces and the English Parliamentary forces under Oliver Cromwell. The Parliamentary forces were victorious and able to march on to take Edinburgh.

Following the Restoration of the monarchy, Glorious Revolution and Acts of Union, Jacobite forces conflicted with Government forces, with the main conflict taking place as part of the 1715 Rising and 1745 Rising. Under the command of Sir John Cope, the British Army met with the Jacobites under Charles Edward Stuart at the Battle of Prestonpans in the west of the county in September 1745, with the Jacobite side gaining a significant victory before being defeated at the Battle of Culloden in April 1746.

=== Modern history ===
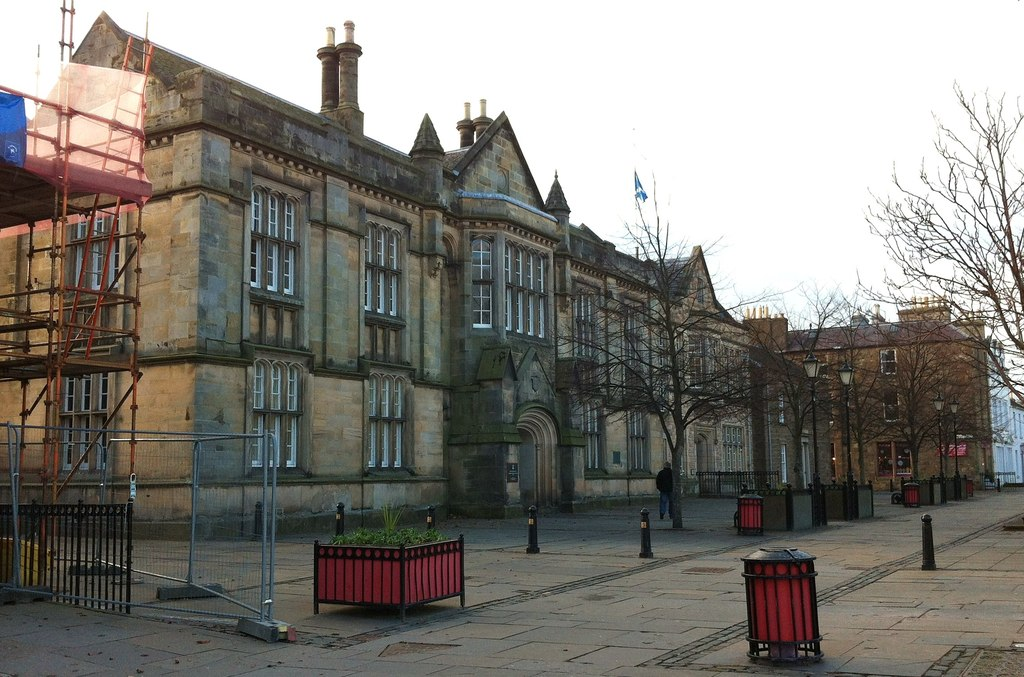
County Buildings in Court Street, Haddington, the former headquarters of East Lothian County Council

Haddingtonshire County Council was created in 1890 under the Local Government (Scotland) Act 1889, which established elected county councils across Scotland, taking over most of the functions of the Commissioners of Supply, which had been the main administrative body of the shire since 1667. The county council was based at County Buildings in Court Street, Haddington, which had been built in 1833 and also served as the county's sheriff court.

In April 1921 the county council voted to request a change of the county's name from Haddingtonshire to "East Lothian". The government agreed and brought the change into effect as part of the East Lothian County Buildings Order Confirmation Act 1921, which received royal assent on 8 November 1921. The act also transferred ownership of the County Buildings to the county council.

In 1975 under the Local Government (Scotland) Act 1973, Scotland's county councils were dissolved and a new system of regional and district councils was created. East Lothian District was created within the wider Lothian region. The district comprised the historic county of East Lothian plus the burgh of Musselburgh and the parish of Inveresk (which included Wallyford and Whitecraig) from the county of Midlothian.

When further reforms in 1996 moved Scotland to a system of 32 unitary local authorities, the modern council area of East Lothian was created.

== Geography ==
East Lothian is predominantly rural. It has 40 miles (64 km) of coastline where the towns of Musselburgh, Prestonpans, Cockenzie and Port Seton, Longniddry, Aberlady, Gullane, North Berwick and Dunbar lie along the coast of the Firth of Forth. The coast has several headlands and bays, most notably Gosford Bay, Aberlady Bay, Gullane Point, Sandy Hirst, Tyne Mouth, Belhaven Bay, Barns Ness, Chapel Point and Torness Point. There are several small islands off the coast north of North Berwick, the largest of these being Fidra, Lamb, Craigleith and Bass Rock.

Only two towns are landlocked, Tranent and Haddington. To the south are the Lammermuir Hills along the boundary with Berwickshire; it is here that Meikle Says Law, the highest point in the county at 535 metres (1,755 ft), can be found. The River Tyne flows through Haddington and several of East Lothian's villages, reaching the Firth of Forth near Belhaven. The River Esk flows through Inveresk and Musselburgh where it empties at the north of the town into the Firth of Forth. Major bodies of water include Pressmennan Lake, the Whiteadder Reservoir, Hopes Reservoir, Stobshiel Reservoir and Lammerloch Reservoir.

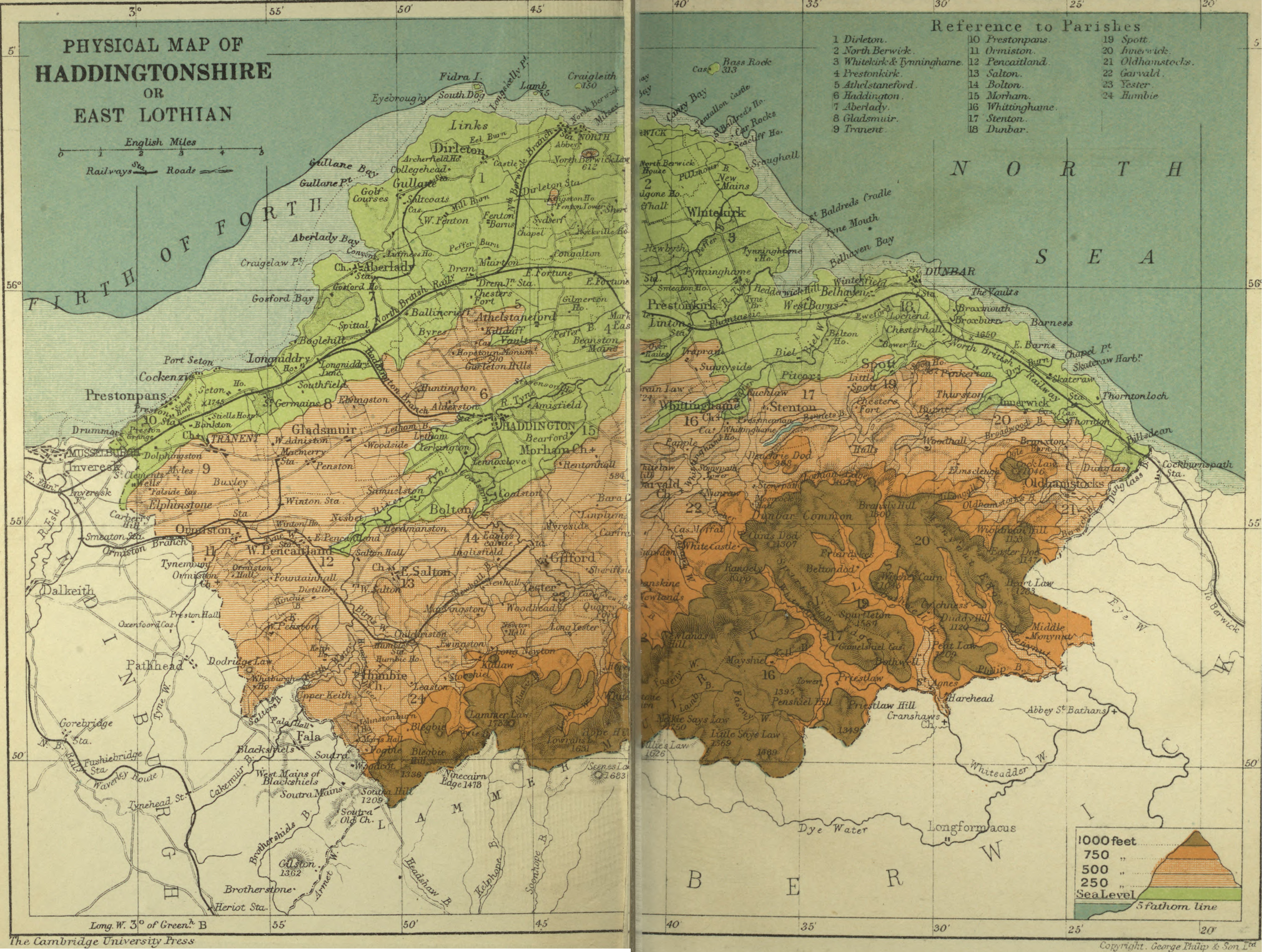
Orographical Map of East Lothian

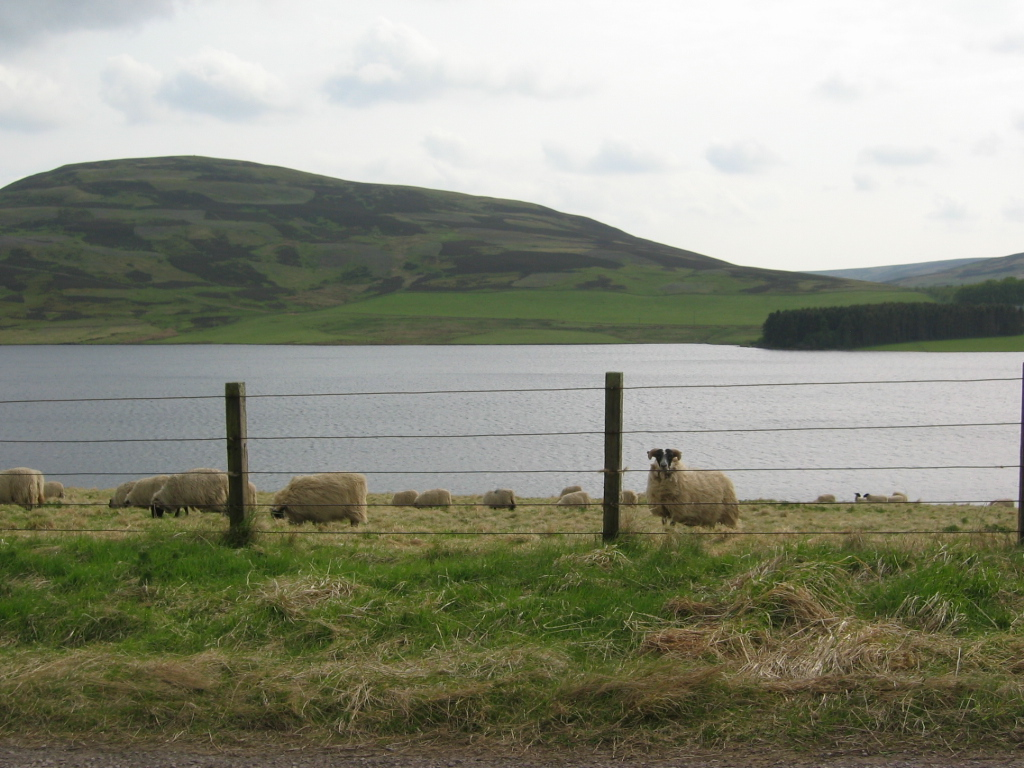
The Whiteadder Reservoir

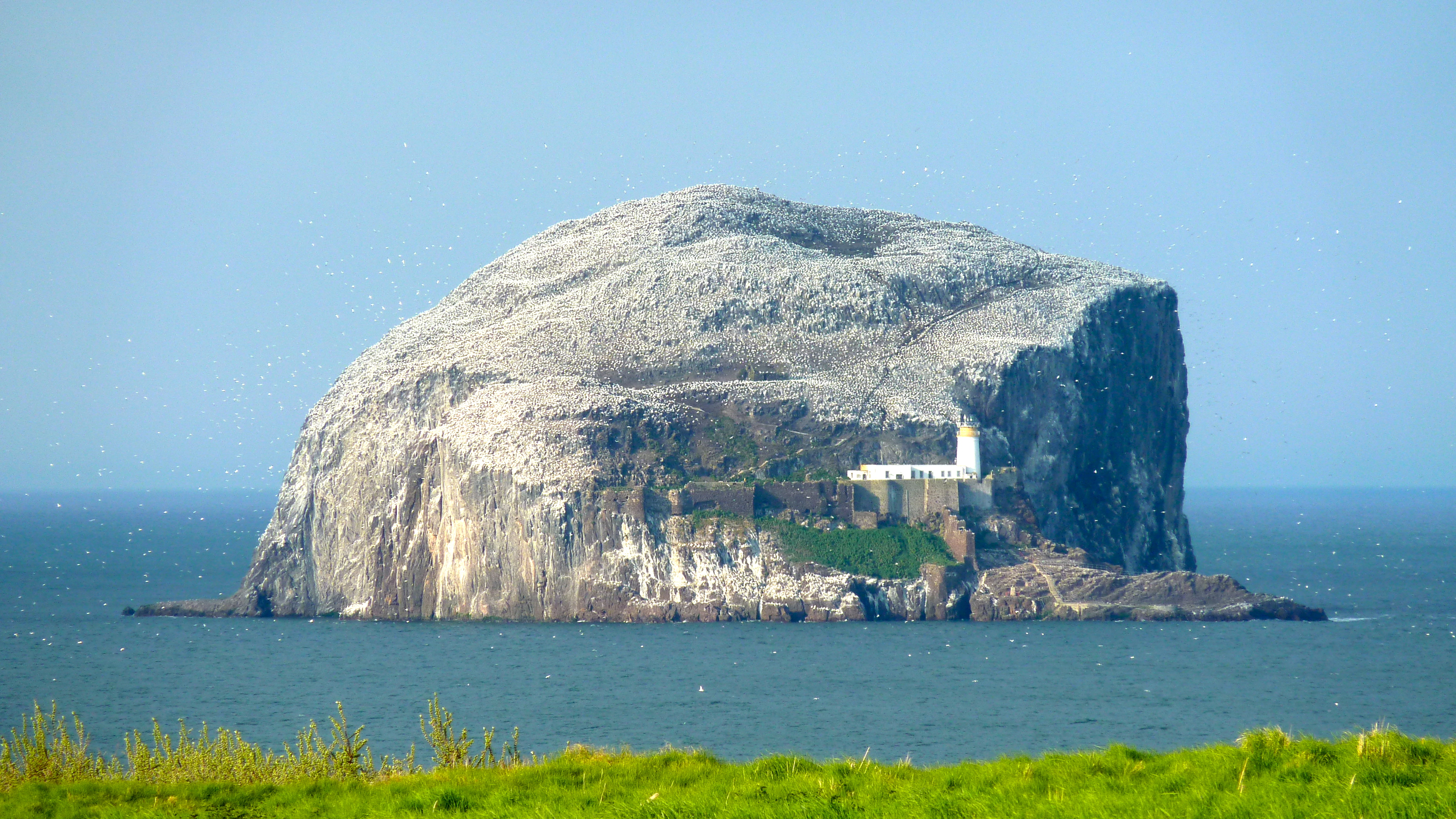
Bass Rock in the Firth of Forth

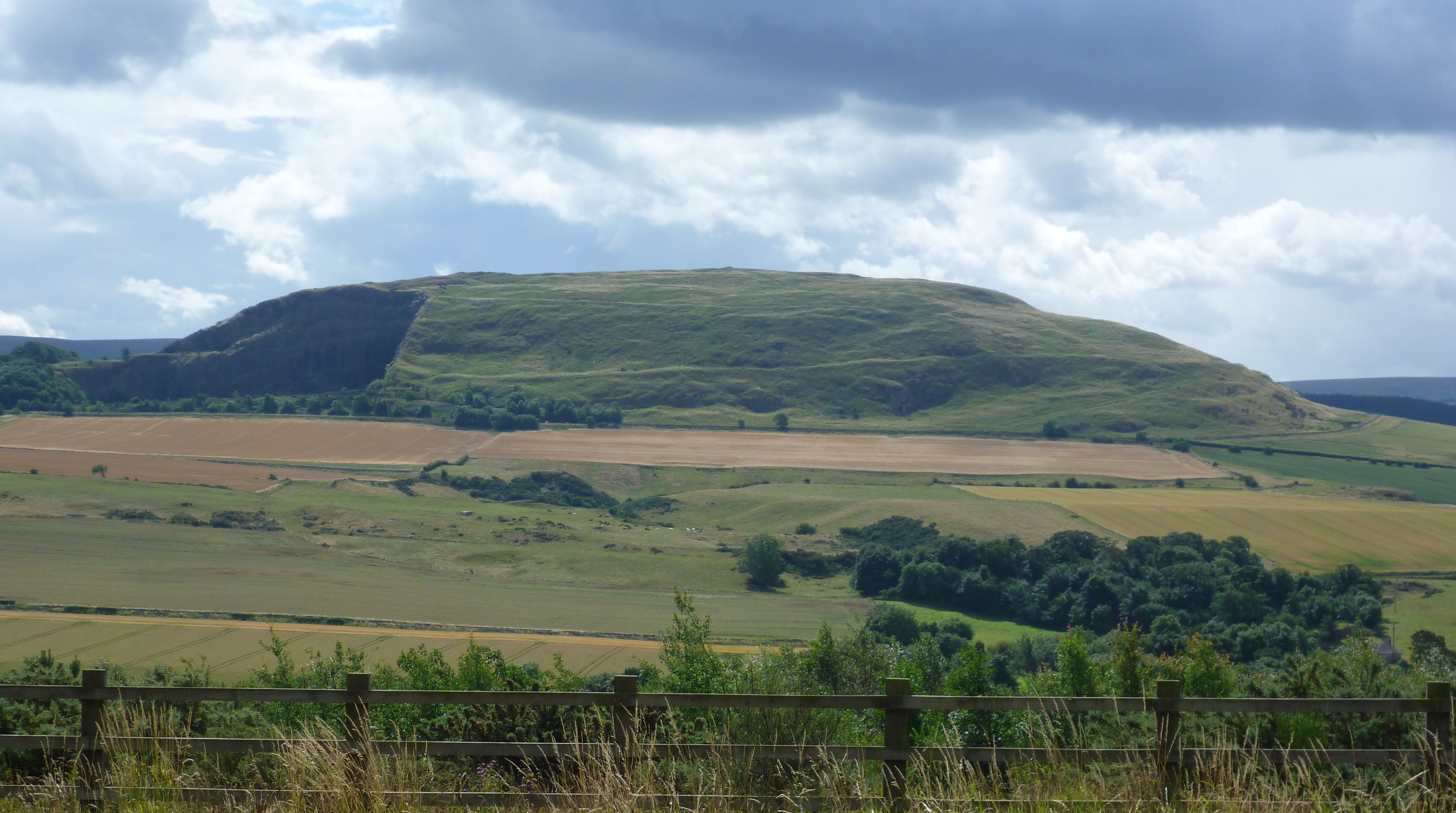
Traprain Law

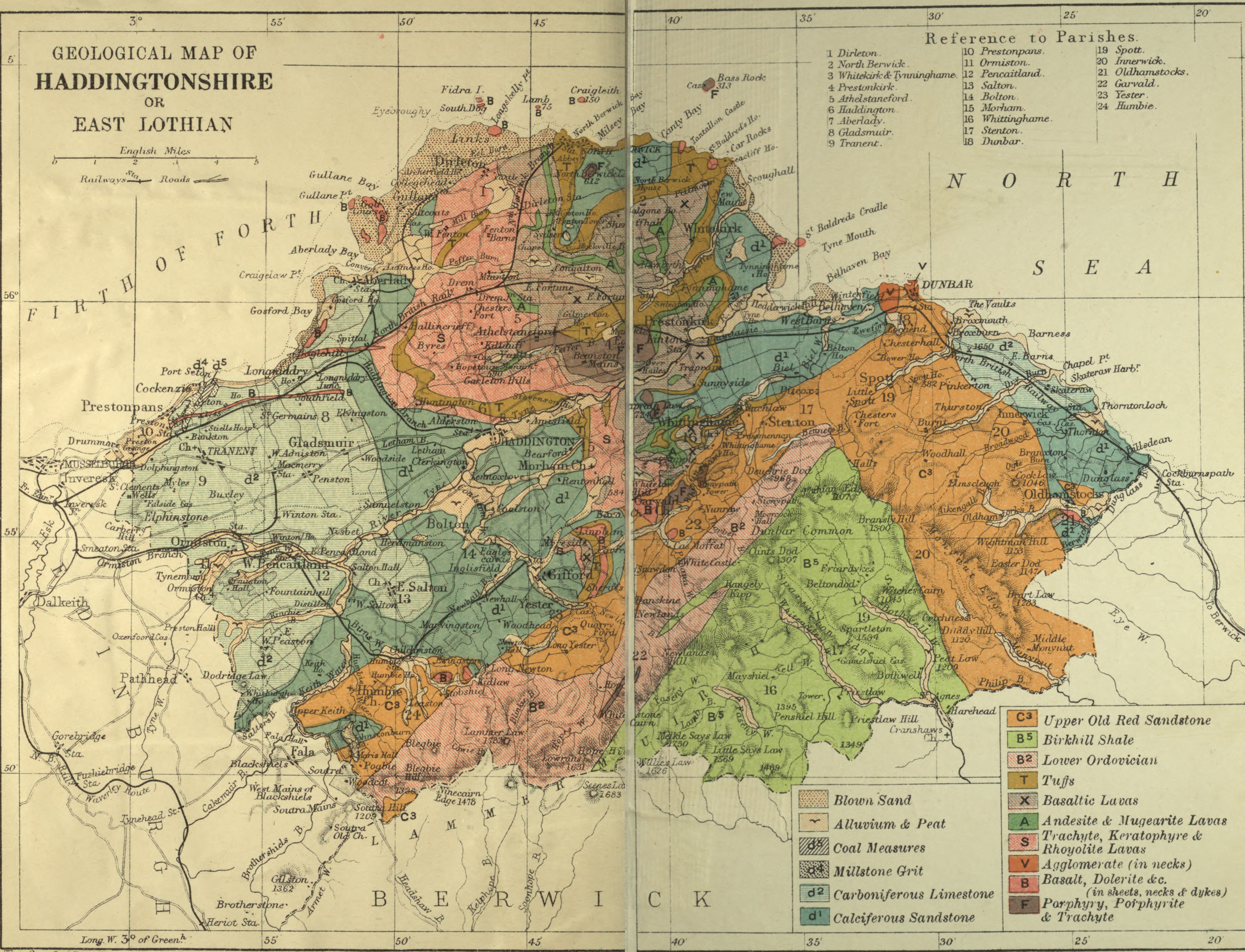
Geological Map of East Lothian

== Transport ==
=== Road ===
The A1 road travels through East Lothian where it meets the Scottish Borders southbound and Edinburgh northbound. The A1 throughout East Lothian is dual carriageway and major junctions include Dunbar, Haddington, Tranent, Prestonpans and Musselburgh.

Starting in Leith, the A199 road also travels through East Lothian beginning at Musselburgh and passing through Wallyford, Tranent, Macmerry and Haddington before joining the A1 in West Barns.

Some non-primary routes in East Lothian are the A198, A1087, A6093 and A6137 roads.

=== Public transport ===
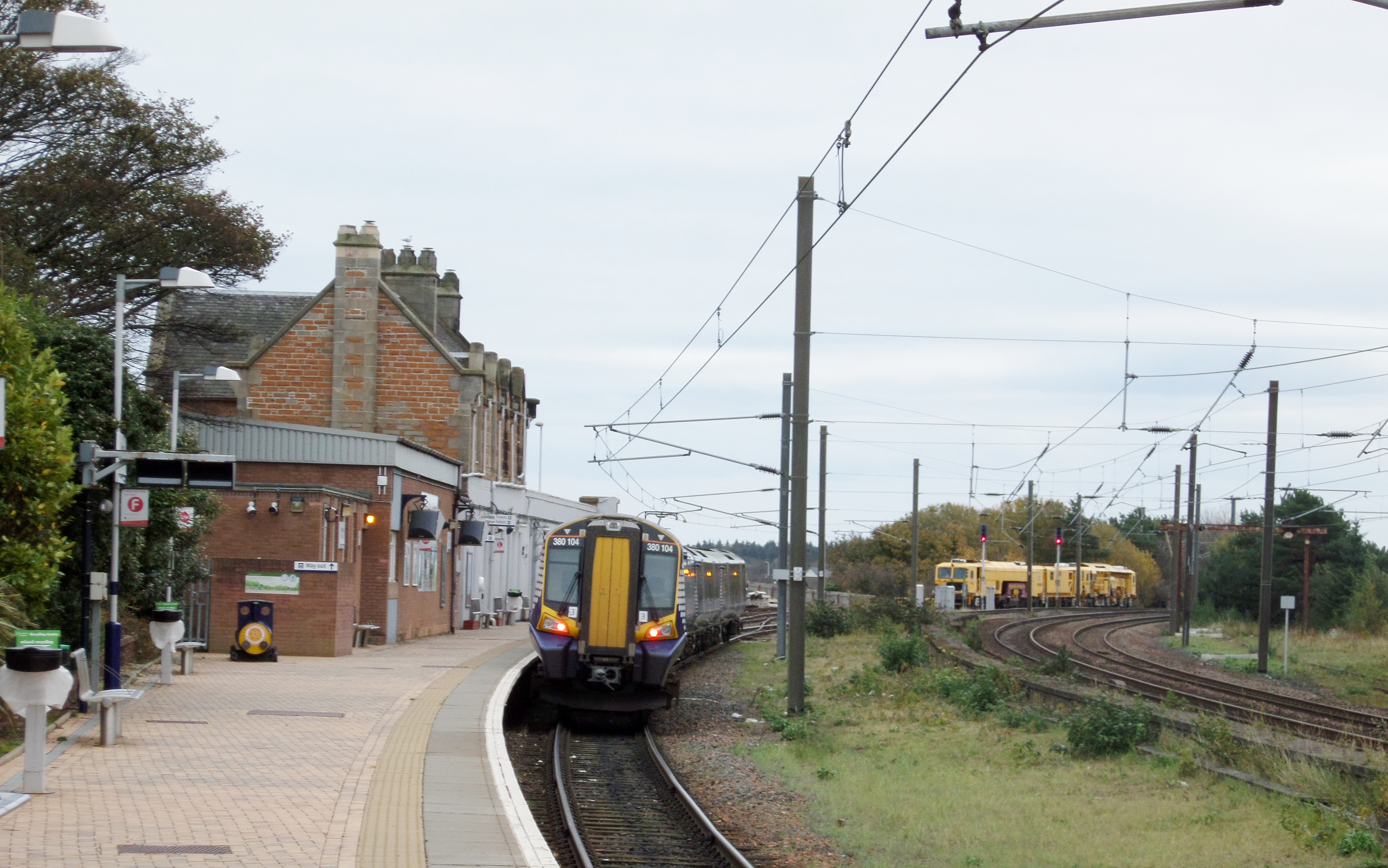
Dunbar railway station, before a bridge was built over the tracks and a platform on the other side.

East Lothian is served by eight railway stations: East Linton (opened December 2023), Dunbar and Musselburgh on the East Coast Main Line; and North Berwick, Drem, Longniddry, Prestonpans and Wallyford on the North Berwick Line. Rail service operators which travel through and stop at stations in the area include: ScotRail on both lines; and CrossCountry and London North Eastern Railway on the East Coast Main Line.

Bus operators in East Lothian are: Lothian Buses and its subsidiary East Coast Buses, Eve Coaches of Dunbar, Prentice of Haddington and Borders Buses. East Coast Buses is the main bus service provider connecting the towns and villages of East Lothian to Edinburgh. The company has depots in North Berwick and Musselburgh.

== Demography ==
The population of East Lothian as of 2025 is 116,460. The fastest growing district in East Lothian is the Tranent, Wallyford and Macmerry ward which is expected to see its population of just over 20,000 increase to just under 30,000 by 2026.

=== Languages ===
The 2022 Scottish Census reported that out of 109,093 residents aged three and over, 34,037 (31.2%) considered themselves able to speak or read the Scots language.

The 2022 Scottish Census reported that out of 109,096 residents aged three and over, 849 (0.8%) considered themselves able to speak or read Gaelic.

=== Ethnicity ===
Ethnic Group	2001		2011		2022	
Ethnic Group	Number	%	Number	%	Number	%
White: Total	89,433	99.27%	98,011	98.29%	108,844	96.94%
White: Scottish	79,942	88.74%	85,347	85.59%	89,252	79.49%
White: Other British	7,708	8.56%	9,244	9.27%	13,508	12.03%
White: Irish	547	0.61%	870	0.87%	1,186	1.06%
White: Gypsy/Traveller (Note: New category created for the 2011 census)	–	–	13	–	61	0.05%
White: Polish	–	–	811	0.81%	1,492	1.33%
White: Other	1,236	1.37%	1,726	1.73%	3,341	2.98%
Asian, Asian Scottish or Asian British: Total	319	0.35%	955	0.96%	1,368	1.22%
Asian, Asian Scottish or Asian British: Indian	63	0.07%	275	0.28%	318	0.28%
Asian, Asian Scottish or Asian British: Pakistani	110	0.12%	288	0.29%	436	0.39%
Asian, Asian Scottish or Asian British: Bangladeshi	14	–	43	–	28	–
Asian, Asian Scottish or Asian British: Chinese	95	0.11%	209	0.21%	266	0.24%
Asian, Asian Scottish or Asian British: Asian Other	37	–	140	0.14%	323	0.29%
Black, Black Scottish or Black British (Note: Category restructured for the 2011 census)	18	–	–	–	–	–
African: Total	31	–	179	0.18%	315	0.28%
African: African, African Scottish or African British	–	–	177	0.18%	38	–
African: Other African	–	–	2	–	279	0.25%
Caribbean or Black: Total	–	–	107	0.11%	99	0.09%
Caribbean	30	–	59	0.06%	46	–
Black	–	–	29	–	10	–
Caribbean or Black: Other	–	–	19	–	43	–
Mixed or multiple ethnic groups: Total	176	0.20%	363	0.36%	1,164	1.04%
Other: Total	81	0.09%	102	0.10%	496	0.44%
Other: Arab	–	–	74	0.07%	153	0.14%
Other: Any other ethnic group	–	–	28	–	339	0.30%
Total:	90,088	100.00%	99,717	100.00%	112,284	100.00%

== Politics ==
In the 2014 Scottish independence referendum, a majority of voters in the East Lothian council area opted for Scotland to remain a part of the United Kingdom - with 61.72% casting their ballots for the Union and 38.28% voting for independence.

=== Parliament of the United Kingdom ===
Lothian East is a constituency in the House of Commons, electing one Member of Parliament.

The current MP for Lothian East is Douglas Alexander of the Labour Party, who has represented the constituency since the 2024 general election, replacing Alba Party MP, Kenny MacAskill.

Former UK Prime Minister Arthur Balfour was born on 25 July 1848 at Whittingehame House in what is now the Lothian East constituency.

General election 2024: Lothian East
Party	Candidate	Votes	%	±%
Labour Co-op	Douglas Alexander	23,555	49.2	+18.5
SNP	Lyn Jardine	10,290	21.5	−13.4
Conservative	Scott Hamilton	5,335	11.1	−16.0
Reform	Robert Davies	3,039	6.3	N/A
Liberal Democrats	Duncan Dunlop	2,649	5.5	−0.8
Green	Shona McIntosh	2,477	5.2	N/A
Alba	George Kerevan	557	1.2	N/A
Majority		13,265	27.7	N/A
Turnout		47,902	63.4	−8.3
Registered electors		75,546		

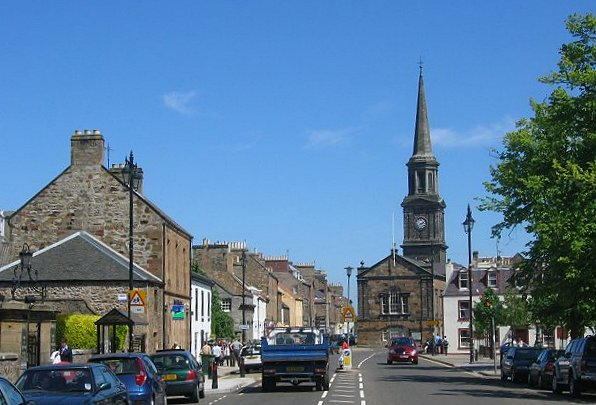
Haddington, with the Town House

=== Scottish Parliament ===
Most of East Lothian is in the East Lothian Coast and Lammermuirs constituency, except Musselburgh and Tranent which are in Edinburgh Eastern, Musselburgh and Tranent. All of East Lothian is in the Edinburgh and Lothians East region.

=== Local government ===
East Lothian Council is based in the historic county town of Haddington, with the council meeting at the Haddington Town House and offices at nearby at John Muir House. The unitary local authority contains six wards, electing 22 councillors. East Lothian Council contains twenty Community Councils whose members form the Association of East Lothian Community Councils.

== Places of interest ==
- Aberlady Bay
- Bass Rock
- Dirleton Castle
- Dunglass Collegiate Church
- Fa'side Castle
- Fenton Barns Retail & Leisure Village
- Hailes Castle
- Hopetoun Monument
- Lennoxlove historic house
- Longniddry Bents
- Muirfield Golf Links
- Museum of Flight, East Fortune
- North Berwick Harbour
- North Berwick Law
- Preston Mill
- Prestongrange Industrial Heritage Museum
- Scottish Seabird Centre, North Berwick
- Seacliff Beach
- Seton Collegiate Church
- Tantallon Castle
- Chesters Hill Fort
- Torness Nuclear Power Station
- Traprain Law
- Yellowcraigs, a beach and conservation area

== Settlements ==
The largest settlements in East Lothian.

Largest settlements by population:

Settlement	Population (2020)
Musselburgh	21,100
Tranent	11,910
Prestonpans	10,460
Haddington	10,360
Dunbar	10,270
North Berwick	7,840
Cockenzie	5,370
Wallyford	3,370
Gullane	2,810
Longniddry	2,340

- Aberlady
- Athelstaneford
- Auldhame
- Ballencrieff
- Bara
- Belhaven
- Biel
- Bilsdean
- Blindwells
- Bolton
- Broxburn
- Canty Bay
- Cockenzie
- Dirleton
- Drem
- Dunbar
- Dunglass
- East Fortune
- East Linton
- East Saltoun
- Elphinstone
- Fenton Barns
- Fisherrow (historically within Midlothian)
- Garvald
- Gifford
- Gladsmuir
- Glenkinchie
- Gullane
- Haddington
- Humbie
- Innerwick
- Inveresk (historically within Midlothian)
- Kingston
- Longniddry
- Luffness
- Macmerry
- Markle
- Monktonhall (historically within Midlothian)
- Musselburgh (historically within Midlothian)
- North Berwick
- Oldhamstocks
- Ormiston
- Peaston
- Pencaitland
- Phantassie
- Port Seton
- Preston
- Prestonpans
- Samuelston
- Scoughall
- Spittal
- Spott
- Stenton
- Tranent
- Tyninghame
- Wallyford (historically within Midlothian)
- West Barns
- West Saltoun
- Whitecraig (historically within Midlothian)
- Whitekirk and Tyninghame
- Whittingehame

== Civil parishes ==
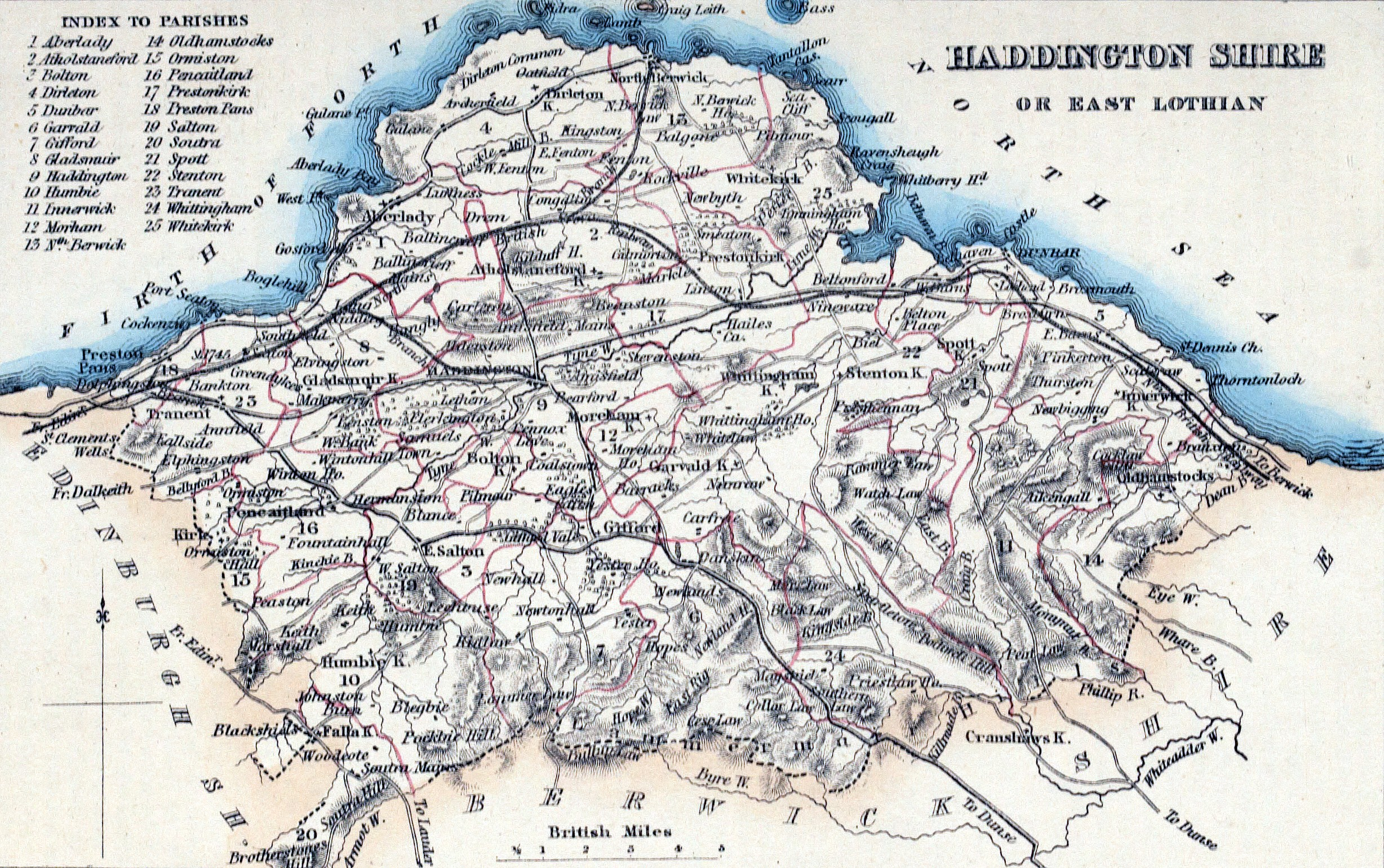
East Lothian or Haddingtonshire Civil Parish map.

In 1894, John Martine published Reminiscences and Notices of Ten Parishes of the County of Haddington.

- Aberlady
- Athelstaneford
- Bolton
- Dirleton
- Dunbar
- Garvald
- Gladsmuir
- Haddington
- Humbie
- Innerwick
- Morham
- North Berwick
- Oldhamstocks
- Ormiston
- Pencaitland
- Prestonkirk
- Prestonpans
- Saltoun
- Spott
- Stenton
- Tranent
- Whittingehame
- Whitekirk and Tyninghame
- Yester

== Education ==
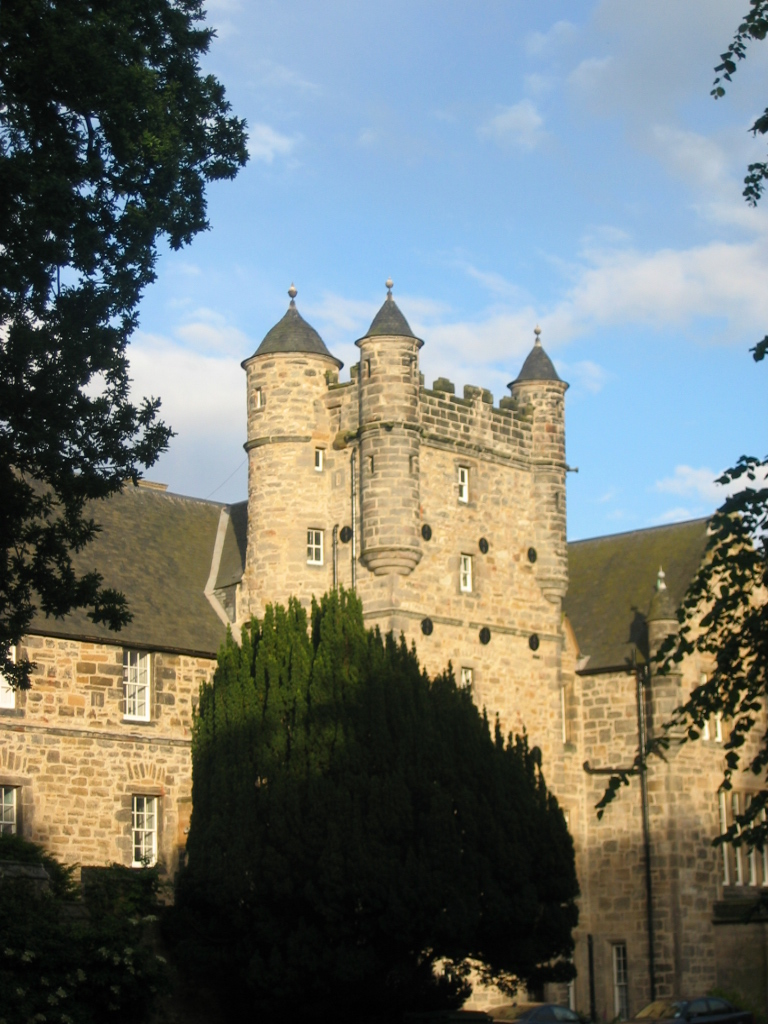
Loretto School's Pinkie House

There are a range of schools in the county, including six state secondaries: Dunbar Grammar School, Knox Academy (formerly the Grammar School) in Haddington, Musselburgh Grammar School, North Berwick High School, Preston Lodge High School in Prestonpans and Ross High School in Tranent.

There are two independent schools in the county. Loretto School is a day and boarding school in Musselburgh founded in 1827 and Belhaven Hill School, established in 1923 is a smaller preparatory school in Dunbar also providing boarding.

In 2007, Queen Margaret University began its move to a new, purpose-built campus in Musselburgh within East Lothian, providing it with its first university.

== Culture and community ==
=== Symbols ===
The County Flag of East Lothian

In November 2017, a county flag competition was launched in East Lothian to register an official flag of East Lothian. Anyone willing to enter this competition was allowed to enter, which resulted in 623 entries to the competition; which closed on 28 February 2018. Four final flag designs were placed in a vote to the residents of East Lothian. In December 2018, the winning design was announced, designed by Archie Martin, a local man from Musselburgh and residing in Gifford who had worked for East Lothian Council for 23 years. Mr Martin died in July 2018. The flag features a saltire representing East Lothian as the birthplace of Scotland's flag. A gold cross signifies the wealth of East Lothian's farmlands and reputation as the granary of Scotland; with a lion in the centre representing the Haddington lion along with blue stripes to represent the rivers Esk and Tyne.

=== Local media ===
East Lothian is served by a local paid-for weekly newspapers, the East Lothian Courier.

The East Lothian Courier (known locally as "The Courier") began as the Haddingtonshire Courier in 1859, before changing its name in 1971. It was owned by D&J Croal, based in Haddington, until its purchase by the Dunfermline Press Group in 2004. It is now owned by Newsquest.

The East Lothian News was first published in 1971, as part of Scottish County Press Group, with editorial offices in Dalkeith and printing at Bonnyrigg (both in Midlothian). The Scottish County Press Group was acquired by Regional Independent Media in 2000, which was in turn bought by Johnston Press in 2002. The East Lothian News closed in 2015.

There are two local community radio stations in East Lothian, broadcasting on FM and online. East Coast FM, based in Haddington, has been broadcasting since 2009. Radio Saltire, formerly East Lothian FM, is now based in Tranent.

=== Notable people (by date of death) ===
- Gospatric II, Earl of Lothian, d.1138
- Gospatric III, Earl of Lothian, d.1166
- Waltheof, Earl of Dunbar, d.1182
- Alexander II, King of Scots, 1198–1249
- Black Agnes, 4th Countess of Moray, c.1312-1369
- Abbot Walter Bower, ca.1385–1449, canon regular of Inchcolm Abbey, chronicler, born about at Haddington
- Sawney Bean, cannibal and outlaw, 15th to 16th century
- William Dunbar, medieval poet, 1460–1520
- John Mair or Major, philosopher, 1467–1550
- John Knox, leading Protestant reformer in Scotland and founder of Presbyterianism, c.1510-1572
- John Cockburn of Ormiston, (d.1583) early supporter of the Scottish Reformation
- Ninian Cockburn (d.1579), soldier, an officer of the Garde Écossaise, political intriguer
- Andrew Fletcher of Saltoun (1655–1716), writer, politician, soldier and patriot
- Adam Cockburn, Laird of Ormiston, Lord Ormiston (1656–1735), administrator, politician and judge
- John Cockburn, agricultural improver, 1695–1758
- Andrew Meikle, inventor of the Threshing machine, 1719–1811
- John Brown of Haddington, 1722–1787
- Rev. Dr. John Witherspoon, a signatory to the United States Declaration of Independence, 1723–1794
- George Brodie (1786?-1867), historian
- Robert Cadell (1788–1849), bookseller and publisher, closely associated with Sir Walter Scott
- Thomas Alexander 1812-1860, Military surgeon
- Robert Moffat 1795–1883, Congregationalist missionary to Africa, and father in law of David Livingstone
- Jane Welsh Carlyle, 1801–1866, letter-writer, and wife of Thomas Carlyle, 1801–1866
- Sir William Fergusson, 1st Baronet, surgeon, 1808–1877
- Samuel Smiles, author of Self-Help, 1812–1904
- Mary Balfour Herbert, watercolour painter, 1817–1893
- Samuel Morison Brown, chemist, poet and essayist, 1817–1856
- John Muir, father of the US National Parks, 1838–1914
- Eleanor Mildred Sidgwick, Principal of Newnham College, 1845–1936
- James Porteous, inventor of the Fresno Scraper, 1848–1922
- Peter Hume Brown, historian, 1849–1918
- Arthur Balfour (1848–1930), Prime Minister, 1902–1905
- Eleanor Mildred Sidgwick (1845–1936), mathematician and co-founder of Newnham College, University of Cambridge
- William George Nicholson Geddes 1913–1993, civil engineer
- Maureen Mollie Hunter McIlwraith, commonly known as Mollie Hunter 1922–2012, Scottish writer
- Peter Kerr b.1940, best-selling author of travel books and fiction
- John Bellany, painter, 1942–2013
- Rhona Cameron, comedian and activist, b.1965

A number of sports personalities also have links with East Lothian:

- Willie Anderson, golfer, four times U.S. Open Golf Champion, 1901, 1903–05
- Ian Black, professional footballer
- Callum Booth, professional footballer
- Billy Brown, football coach
- Kenny Miller, professional footballer
- Colin Nish, professional footballer
- Jim Calder rugby union player
- Gary Anderson, Darts player
- Andrew Driver, professional footballer
- Danny Handling, professional footballer
- Jason Holt, Professional footballer
- David Huish, professional golfer
- Allan Jacobsen, rugby union player
- Jim Jefferies, football manager
- John McGlynn, football manager
- Catriona Matthew, golfer
- Mathew Dawson, racehorse trainer
- Euan Burton, judoka and 2012 Olympics contender
- Finlay Calder, rugby union player
- Ross Muir, professional snooker player
- Scott Murray, rugby union player
- Garry O'Connor, professional footballer
- Willie Ormond, footballer and manager
- Jock Taylor, World Champion motorcycle sidecar racer
- Ben Sayers, professional golfer & club maker
- John White, footballer
- Willie Wood (bowler), professional bowler
- Dean Brett, footballer
- Josh Taylor, boxer

== Freedom of the County ==
The following people and military units have received the Freedom of the County of East Lothian.

=== Individuals ===
- John Bellany: 2004.
- Catriona Matthew: 2009.

=== Military Units ===
- 1st Battalion The Royal Scots Borderers: 2012.
- E Squadron The Scottish and North Irish Yeomanry: 6 July 2019.

== Bibliography ==
=== Church and parish histories: Presbytery of Haddington ===
- The Lamp of Lothian; or, The History of Haddington. James Miller (new edition, 1900).
- Reminiscences of the Royal Burgh of Haddington. John Martine (1883).
- Reminiscences of the County of Haddington. John Martine (1890).
- Reminiscences of the County of Haddington. Second Series, ed. E. J. Wilson (1895).
- The History of Morham. David Louden (1889).
- North Berwick and its Vicinity. George Ferrier (1875).
- The Bass Rock, its Civil and Ecclesiastical History. Thomas M'Crie, D.D. (1847).
- Emeralds chased in Gold. Rev. John Dickson (1899).
- Prestonpans and Vicinity. P. M'Neill (1902).
- Tranent and its Surroundings. P. M'Neill (1884).
- East Lothian Studies. Louden and Whitfield (1891).
- East Lothian. Charles E. Green (1907).
- Sketches of East Lothian. D. Croal (1873).

=== Presbytery of Dunbar ===
- Coldingham: Parish and Priory [notices of Cockburnspath, etc.]. A. Thomson (1908).
- The History of Dunbar. James Miller (1859).
- An Old Kirk Chronicle. Peter Hately Waddell, D.D. (1893).
- The Churches of St Baldred. Rev. A. I. Ritchie (1880).
- Saint Mary's, Whitekirk. Rev. E. B. Rankin (1914).
- History of Berwickshire Naturalists' Club [for Cockburnspath, Oldhamstocks, etc.]
