= List of listed buildings in Haddington, East Lothian =

This is a list of listed buildings in the parish of Haddington in East Lothian, Scotland.

== List ==
Name	Location	Date listed	Grid ref. (Note: Sometimes known as OSGB36, the grid reference (where provided) is based on the British national grid reference system used by the Ordnance Survey. • "Guide to National Grid". Ordnance Survey. • "Get-a-map". Ordnance Survey.)	Geo-coordinates	Notes	LB number (Note: Historic Environment Scotland assign a unique alphanumeric identifier to each designated site in Scotland, for listed buildings this always begins with "LB", for example "LB12345".)	Image
Westfield Cottages Nos 3 To 6				55°55′59″N 2°48′19″W	Category C(S)	43562	Upload Photo
Abbey, Old School And Adjacent Buildings				55°57′46″N 2°44′57″W	Category B	43523	Upload Photo
Camptoun Steading, Cartshed And Granary				55°59′26″N 2°48′07″W	Category C(S)	43537	Upload Photo
Lennoxlove Acredales, With Gateway				55°56′55″N 2°46′24″W	Category C(S)	43545	Upload Photo
Lennoxlove House, South Lodge				55°55′59″N 2°47′04″W	Category C(S)	43550	Upload Photo
Sandersdean, Former Cottages Now Outbuilding				55°56′11″N 2°44′49″W	Category B	43555	Upload Photo
Stevenson House Walled Garden, Trust Cottage And Gardeners Cottage				55°57′53″N 2°43′44″W	Category C(S)	43558	Upload Photo
Greenknowe Coatfield (Off Dunbar Road)				55°57′39″N 2°46′39″W	Category B	34469	Upload Photo
Buildings At Rear Of Garage, Hardgate				55°57′20″N 2°46′31″W	Category C(S)	34350	Upload Photo
3, 4 The Sands				55°57′16″N 2°46′24″W	Category B	34364	Upload Photo
1, 2 Sidegate				55°57′18″N 2°46′30″W	Category B	34367	Upload Photo
Building At Rear Of 7 Sidegate				55°57′18″N 2°46′31″W	Category B	34370	Upload Photo
13, 15 Sidegate				55°57′15″N 2°46′30″W	Category B	34374	Upload Photo
17, 18, 19 Sidegate				55°57′15″N 2°46′29″W	Category C(S)	34375	Upload Photo
Newburn Lodge 22 Sidegate				55°57′13″N 2°46′29″W	Category C(S)	34378	Upload Photo
2-7 St Ann's Place				55°57′17″N 2°46′27″W	Category B	34383	Upload Photo
Garden Walls And Gatepiers Haddington House Sidegate				55°57′14″N 2°46′25″W	Category B	34390	Upload Photo
7, 8 Poldrate				55°57′08″N 2°46′27″W	Category C(S)	34406	Upload Photo
West Mills Cottage Distillery Park				55°57′03″N 2°46′53″W	Category B	34411	Upload Photo
Tynebank Tynebank Road				55°57′04″N 2°47′04″W	Category B	34413	Upload Photo
Cumming's Buildings Waterside				55°57′17″N 2°46′15″W	Category C(S)	34421	Upload Photo
Gimmersmill House, Gimmers Mill Now Offices For Bermaline Mills				55°57′25″N 2°46′24″W	Category B	34427	Upload Photo
Knox House Newton Port				55°57′12″N 2°46′13″W	Category C(S)	34447	Upload Photo
Knox Institute Knox Place				55°57′16″N 2°47′06″W	Category B	34451	Upload Photo
Mansefield Station Road West End				55°57′21″N 2°47′05″W	Category B	34456	Upload Photo
Building At Rear Of 1, 2 Lodge Street				55°57′18″N 2°46′43″W	Category B	34247	Upload Photo
Buildings Peffer's Place				55°57′16″N 2°46′50″W	Category C(S)	34259	Upload Photo
Buildings, Brewery Park Lane Court Street				55°57′19″N 2°46′53″W	Category C(S)	34263	Upload Photo
39, 41 Court Street Police Station				55°57′19″N 2°46′56″W	Category B	34269	Upload Photo
51, 53 Court Street				55°57′19″N 2°47′00″W	Category C(S)	34270	Upload Photo
59 Court Street				55°57′19″N 2°47′01″W	Category B	34272	Upload Photo
20, 22 Court Street				55°57′21″N 2°46′47″W	Category B	34288	Upload Photo
42, 43, 44 Market Street				55°57′21″N 2°46′43″W	Category B	34296	Upload Photo
37, 38 Market St				55°57′21″N 2°46′42″W	Category B	34298	Upload Photo
31, 32, 33 Market Street				55°57′21″N 2°46′40″W	Category B	34300	Upload Photo
13 Market Street				55°57′22″N 2°46′35″W	Category B	34312	Upload Photo
Old Evangelical Union Church, Off Market Street, (Now Used By British Legion)				55°57′23″N 2°46′34″W	Category B	34314	Upload Photo
5, 6 Market Street				55°57′22″N 2°46′32″W	Category B	34316	Upload Photo
70 Market Street Crown Dairy				55°57′20″N 2°46′35″W	Category B	34324	Upload Photo
52, 53 Market St				55°57′20″N 2°46′42″W	Category C(S)	34334	Upload Photo
68 High Street				55°57′20″N 2°46′38″W	Category B	34191	Upload Photo
80, 81 High Street				55°57′20″N 2°46′35″W	Category B	34199	Upload Photo
82, 83, 84, High Street				55°57′20″N 2°46′34″W	Category B	34200	Upload Photo
85, 86, 87 High Street				55°57′20″N 2°46′34″W	Category B	34201	Upload Photo
90 High Street				55°57′20″N 2°46′33″W	Category B	34203	Upload Photo
5, 6, 7 High Street				55°57′18″N 2°46′31″W	Category B	34208	Upload Photo
9 High Street				55°57′19″N 2°46′32″W	Category B	34210	Upload Photo
Mungoswells, With Garden Walls				56°00′00″N 2°48′33″W	Category B	13205	Upload Photo
Letham House, With Pavilions, Gatepiers And Glasshouse				55°57′01″N 2°48′45″W	Category B	10813	Upload Photo
Stevenson House, With Garden Statuary And Gates				55°57′51″N 2°43′52″W	Category A	10821	Upload Photo
Amisfield Park, Ice House				55°57′36″N 2°45′24″W	Category C(S)	10828	Upload Photo
Hopetoun Monument				55°58′42″N 2°48′06″W	Category B	10831	Upload Photo
Alderston House, With Icehouse				55°57′40″N 2°48′12″W	Category B	10834	Upload Photo
Garlton Unit, (Admissions Unit) Hermandflat Hospital, Aberlady Road, Haddington And Including Boundary Walls				55°57′37″N 2°47′17″W	Category B	50860	Upload Photo
Abbey Mill				55°57′44″N 2°44′50″W	Category B	43524	Upload Photo
Abbey Mill Farm				55°57′47″N 2°44′54″W	Category B	43525	Upload Photo
Amisfield Mains Farmhouse				55°58′09″N 2°45′37″W	Category C(S)	43528	Upload Photo
Camptoun House, With Coach House, Stables And Walled Garden				55°59′21″N 2°48′03″W	Category B	43535	Upload Photo
Colstoun, Front Lodge Bridge To Main Drive				55°55′57″N 2°46′44″W	Category B	43540	Upload Photo
Monkrigg Farmhouse				55°56′39″N 2°45′46″W	Category B	43553	Upload Photo
Lochinvar 1 West Road				55°57′20″N 2°47′26″W	Category B	34463	Upload Photo
Hatchery Cottage West Road				55°57′14″N 2°47′56″W	Category C(S)	34466	Upload Photo
Garage, Hardgate				55°57′21″N 2°46′31″W	Category C(S)	34349	Upload Photo
21 Sidegate, The Old Manse, (Formerly Church Of Scotland Manse)				55°57′13″N 2°46′32″W	Category B	34377	Upload Photo
Gighouse, At South-East Of Lodge, St Mary's Parish Church				55°57′10″N 2°46′26″W	Category C(S)	34395	Upload Photo
Presbytery Poldrate				55°57′10″N 2°46′26″W	Category C(S)	34396	Upload Photo
Tyne House Hotel Poldrate				55°57′06″N 2°46′28″W	Category B	34400	Upload Photo
Millfield And Outbuildings, Millwynd				55°57′06″N 2°46′48″W	Category C(S)	34407	Upload Photo
Row Of Buildings At West Entrance To Haddington Maltings				55°57′03″N 2°46′50″W	Category C(S)	34409	Upload Photo
Nungate Bridge Bridge Street				55°57′17″N 2°46′18″W	Category A	34414	Upload another image See more images
House And Store 19 Bridge Street				55°57′18″N 2°46′13″W	Category C(S)	34416	Upload Photo
Derelict House Waterside				55°57′16″N 2°46′15″W	Category C(S)	34420	Upload Photo
The Elms Dunbar Road				55°57′33″N 2°46′37″W	Category B	34431	Upload Photo
Library And Museum Newton Port				55°57′24″N 2°46′40″W	Category C(S)	34446	Upload Photo
Chestnut Cottage Knox Place				55°57′18″N 2°47′03″W	Category C(S)	34450	Upload Photo
Fonab, Station Road West End				55°57′21″N 2°47′07″W	Category B	34457	Upload Photo
Maryville Station Road West End				55°57′22″N 2°47′15″W	Category B	34460	Upload Photo
Crocegate Dovecot To Rear Of 43, 45 High Street				55°57′15″N 2°46′38″W	Category B	34236	Upload Photo
47 High Street				55°57′19″N 2°46′41″W	Category B	34237	Upload Photo
House At Rear Of 50, 51 High Street				55°57′18″N 2°46′42″W	Category B	34240	Upload Photo
52 High Street. City Bank Building				55°57′19″N 2°46′43″W	Category B	34241	Upload Photo
Beaconsfield Paterson Place				55°57′16″N 2°46′44″W	Category B	34251	Upload Photo
Victoria Inn 3, 5, 7 Court Street And 12 Lodge Street				55°57′19″N 2°46′47″W	Category B	34255	Upload Photo
House, Brewery Park Lane, Court Street				55°57′19″N 2°46′53″W	Category C(S)	34262	Upload Photo
Buildings 2 Brewery Park Lane Court Street				55°57′16″N 2°46′53″W	Category C(S)	34264	Upload Photo
36, 38 Court Street Edinburgh Savings Bank				55°57′20″N 2°46′51″W	Category C(S)	34283	Upload Photo
24 Court Street				55°57′21″N 2°46′48″W	Category B	34287	Upload Photo
20 Market Street Courier Printing Works				55°57′22″N 2°46′37″W	Category B	34308	Upload Photo
Black Bull Hotel Block 73 Market Street				55°57′21″N 2°46′33″W	Category B	34321	Upload Photo
Warehouse Kilpair Street At Rear Of 77 Market Street				55°57′21″N 2°46′33″W	Category C(S)	34336	Upload Photo
4, 5 Hardgate				55°57′20″N 2°46′29″W	Category B	34340	Upload Photo
Bothwell Bank, Hardgate				55°57′25″N 2°46′30″W	Category B	34346	Upload Photo
61, 62, 63 High Street				55°57′20″N 2°46′41″W	Category B	34188	Upload Photo
66, 67 High Street				55°57′20″N 2°46′40″W	Category B	34190	Upload Photo
Building At Rear Of 19, 20 High Street				55°57′18″N 2°46′34″W	Category B	34220	Upload Photo
Begbie Steading				55°55′40″N 2°48′53″W	Category B	13202	Upload Photo
Amisfield Mains, Gothic Barn				55°58′10″N 2°45′34″W	Category C(S)	13204	Upload Photo
Lennoxlove House Or Lethington				55°56′20″N 2°46′40″W	Category A	10814	Upload another image See more images
Colstoun House, With Garden Statuary				55°55′46″N 2°46′37″W	Category B	10816	Upload another image
West Bearford Steading				55°56′56″N 2°43′40″W	Category B	10830	Upload Photo
Huntington House, With Walled Garden				55°57′47″N 2°49′28″W	Category A	10832	Upload Photo
Florabank Road, Templedean House And West Templedean Including Boundary Walls And Gatepiers				55°57′37″N 2°46′52″W	Category C(S)	49904	Upload Photo
Amisfield Park Weir Or Cascade				55°57′38″N 2°45′23″W	Category C(S)	43530	Upload Photo
Grant's Braes Bridge				55°56′15″N 2°47′33″W	Category B	43543	Upload Photo
Lennoxlove House, Boundary Walls				55°56′20″N 2°46′40″W	Category B	43546	Upload Photo
Lennoxlove House, North Lodge And North Port				55°56′40″N 2°46′56″W	Category B	43549	Upload Photo
57 Hardgate St John Kilwinning Lodge				55°57′21″N 2°46′30″W	Category C(S)	34348	Upload Photo
18 Church Street				55°57′17″N 2°46′27″W	Category B	34353	Upload Photo
Tyne Lodge 9 The Sands				55°57′16″N 2°46′23″W	Category B	34366	Upload Photo
Holmsdale 11 Sidegate				55°57′16″N 2°46′30″W	Category B	34373	Upload Photo
33,35 Sidegate				55°57′16″N 2°46′29″W	Category B	34385	Upload Photo
St Mary's Parish Church And Churchyard Including Boundary Walls, Gatepiers And Gates				55°57′12″N 2°46′19″W	Category A	34391	Upload Photo
Garden Walls And Gatepiers Lady Kitty's Garden				55°57′15″N 2°46′21″W	Category B	34392	Upload Photo
Lodge St Mary's Parish Church				55°57′11″N 2°46′26″W	Category C(S)	34394	Upload Photo
Granary Ford Road				55°57′16″N 2°46′11″W	Category C(S)	34418	Upload Photo
Spancilhill St Martin's Gate				55°57′22″N 2°46′11″W	Category C(S)	34424	Upload Photo
Bermaline Maltings Whittingehame Drive				55°57′24″N 2°46′21″W	Category C(S)	34429	Upload Photo
Ivybank Dunbar Road				55°57′33″N 2°46′38″W	Category C(S)	34432	Upload Photo
43, 44, 45 High Street				55°57′19″N 2°46′40″W	Category B	34234	Upload Photo
Primrose Bank Entering At 3 Lodge Street				55°57′16″N 2°46′43″W	Category B	34249	Upload Photo
35 Court Street Weston Nurseries				55°57′18″N 2°46′55″W	Category C(S)	34268	Upload Photo
Railway Hotel Court Street				55°57′20″N 2°47′01″W	Category C(S)	34274	Upload Photo
34 Court Street				55°57′21″N 2°46′50″W	Category B	34284	Upload Photo
22 Market Street				55°57′21″N 2°46′38″W	Category B	34307	Upload Photo
18 Market Street				55°57′22″N 2°46′36″W	Category B	34309	Upload Photo
Town Hall				55°57′20″N 2°46′43″W	Category A	34185	Upload another image
1 High Street				55°57′19″N 2°46′30″W	Category B	34206	Upload Photo
15 High Street				55°57′19″N 2°46′33″W	Category B	34216	Upload Photo
17, 18 High Street				55°57′19″N 2°46′34″W	Category B	34218	Upload Photo
21, 22 High Street				55°57′19″N 2°46′35″W	Category B	34221	Upload Photo
29, 30, 31 High Street				55°57′19″N 2°46′36″W	Category B	34226	Upload Photo
33, 34 High Street				55°57′19″N 2°46′37″W	Category B	34230	Upload Photo
Amisfield Park, West Gates With Amisfield Cottage And West Lodge				55°57′19″N 2°45′54″W	Category B	10818	Upload Photo
Amisfield House Stables				55°57′32″N 2°45′20″W	Category B	10819	Upload Photo
Barnes Castle Or Barney Vaults				55°58′47″N 2°45′25″W	Category B	10823	Upload Photo
Amisfield Park Walled Garden				55°57′30″N 2°44′58″W	Category A	10825	Upload another image See more images
Colstoun Bridge				55°55′59″N 2°46′42″W	Category B	6391	Upload Photo
Amisfield Park, Ha-Ha				55°57′27″N 2°44′54″W	Category B	46708	Upload Photo
Amisfield Park, Corby Well				55°57′50″N 2°45′10″W	Category C(S)	47924	Upload Photo
Aberlady Road, Herdmanflatt Hospital, North Lodge				55°57′36″N 2°47′16″W	Category C(S)	48294	Upload Photo
Westfield Steading				55°55′59″N 2°48′09″W	Category B	43564	Upload Photo
Woodside				55°56′58″N 2°51′27″W	Category B	43565	Upload Photo
Amisfield Cottages Or Bluehouses				55°57′59″N 2°45′24″W	Category C(S)	43526	Upload Photo
Begbie Farmhouse, With Gatepiers				55°55′39″N 2°48′54″W	Category C(S)	43532	Upload Photo
Clerkington House Stables With Walled Garden				55°56′39″N 2°47′28″W	Category B	43538	Upload Photo
Lennoxlove House, East Port And Lodge				55°56′43″N 2°46′15″W	Category B	43547	Upload Photo
Lennoxlove House, Garden Gateway				55°56′20″N 2°46′39″W	Category A	43548	Upload Photo
Ugston Farmhouse				55°57′45″N 2°48′48″W	Category C(S)	43559	Upload Photo
Westfield Cottages, No 1 And 2				55°56′00″N 2°48′14″W	Category C(S)	43561	Upload Photo
Old Bank House, 43 Hardgate				55°57′27″N 2°46′34″W	Category B	34347	Upload Photo
9, 10, 11, 12 Church Street				55°57′18″N 2°46′24″W	Category B	34351	Upload Photo
3 Church Street				55°57′19″N 2°46′29″W	Category B	34356	Upload Photo
Elm House Church Street				55°57′18″N 2°46′23″W	Category B	34361	Upload Photo
1 The Sands				55°57′17″N 2°46′24″W	Category B	34362	Upload Photo
6, 7 Sidegate				55°57′18″N 2°46′30″W	Category B	34369	Upload Photo
8 And 8A Sidegate				55°57′17″N 2°46′30″W	Category B	34371	Upload Photo
10 Sidegate				55°57′16″N 2°46′30″W	Category B	34372	Upload Photo
Granary Poldrate				55°57′07″N 2°46′27″W	Category B	34402	Upload Photo
House Ford Road				55°57′16″N 2°46′15″W	Category C(S)	34419	Upload Photo
Goatfield Toll House 31 Dunbar Road				55°57′38″N 2°46′36″W	Category C(S)	34435	Upload Photo
3/4 Newton Port East Lothian Courier Warehouse				55°57′22″N 2°46′37″W	Category B	34436	Upload Photo
St John's Church Newton Port				55°57′26″N 2°46′44″W	Category B	34444	Upload Photo
Dale House Off Newton Port				55°57′25″N 2°46′44″W	Category B	34445	Upload Photo
Cottage Adjoining Monument Knox Place				55°57′19″N 2°47′04″W	Category C(S)	34449	Upload Photo
Parkside Cottages Station Road West End				55°57′20″N 2°47′08″W	Category B	34458	Upload Photo
Bellevue Station Road West End				55°57′22″N 2°47′18″W	Category B	34461	Upload Photo
Park View Paterson Place				55°57′13″N 2°46′43″W	Category B	34252	Upload Photo
1-6 Peffer's Place				55°57′16″N 2°46′49″W	Category C(S)	34258	Upload Photo
31 Court Street				55°57′18″N 2°46′54″W	Category B	34266	Upload Photo
1 Hope Street Part Of Railway Hotel Court Street				55°57′20″N 2°47′01″W	Category C(S)	34273	Upload Photo
26 Court Street				55°57′21″N 2°46′48″W	Category B	34286	Upload Photo
16, 18 Court Street				55°57′21″N 2°46′46″W	Category B	34289	Upload Photo
10-14 Court Street				55°57′21″N 2°46′46″W	Category C(S)	34290	Upload Photo
Tweeddale Monument, Court Street				55°57′19″N 2°46′51″W	Category B	34292	Upload Photo
47, 48, 49 Market Street				55°57′21″N 2°46′44″W	Category B	34294	Upload Photo
24, 25 Market St				55°57′21″N 2°46′38″W	Category A	34306	Upload Photo
2, 3 Market Street				55°57′23″N 2°46′32″W	Category B	34318	Upload Photo
71 Market Street				55°57′20″N 2°46′35″W	Category B	34323	Upload Photo
65, 66 Market St				55°57′20″N 2°46′36″W	Category B	34326	Upload Photo
64 Market Street				55°57′20″N 2°46′37″W	Category B	34327	Upload Photo
60, 61, 62 Market Street				55°57′20″N 2°46′38″W	Category B	34329	Upload Photo
Warehouse, Kilpair Street At Rear Of 86, 87 High Street				55°57′20″N 2°46′33″W	Category C(S)	34332	Upload Photo
11, 12, 13 Hardgate				55°57′21″N 2°46′29″W	Category C(S)	34343	Upload Photo
Commercial Hotel 73, 74 High Street				55°57′20″N 2°46′36″W	Category B	34194	Upload Photo
75, 76 77 High Street				55°57′20″N 2°46′36″W	Category B	34195	Upload Photo
79 High Street				55°57′20″N 2°46′35″W	Category B	34198	Upload Photo
3, 4 High Street				55°57′19″N 2°46′31″W	Category B	34207	Upload Photo
8 High Street (At Rear Of 7 High Street)				55°57′18″N 2°46′31″W	Category B	34209	Upload Photo
12, 13, 14 High Street				55°57′19″N 2°46′33″W	Category B	34214	Upload Photo
Building At Rear Of 21, 22 High Street				55°57′18″N 2°46′34″W	Category B	34222	Upload Photo
37, 38, 39 High Street				55°57′19″N 2°46′38″W	Category B	34232	Upload Photo
Colstoun House, Stables And Dovecot				55°55′47″N 2°46′40″W	Category B	10817	Upload another image
Westfield Footbridge				55°56′08″N 2°48′02″W	Category B	10824	Upload Photo
Amisfield Park Temple				55°57′36″N 2°45′11″W	Category B	10826	Upload Photo
Amisfield Park, Gothic Garden House				55°57′19″N 2°44′52″W	Category B	10827	Upload Photo
Amisfield Park, East Gate				55°57′36″N 2°44′54″W	Category C(S)	10829	Upload Photo
Huntington House, Dovecot				55°57′51″N 2°49′35″W	Category A	10833	Upload another image
Byres Tower				55°59′00″N 2°48′35″W	Category B	43534	Upload Photo
Huntington House, S Gateway				55°57′34″N 2°49′37″W	Category B	43544	Upload Photo
Monkrigg				55°56′31″N 2°45′30″W	Category B	43552	Upload Photo
Slateford				55°54′47″N 2°45′04″W	Category C(S)	43557	Upload Photo
St Laurence House West Road				55°57′16″N 2°47′52″W	Category B	34464	Upload Photo
St Laurence Cottage West Road				55°57′14″N 2°47′54″W	Category C(S)	34465	Upload Photo
19 Church Street				55°57′17″N 2°46′27″W	Category B	34354	Upload Photo
Church Hall Church Street				55°57′19″N 2°46′27″W	Category C(S)	34357	Upload Photo
Trinity Episcopal Church Church Street				55°57′20″N 2°46′24″W	Category B	34360	Upload Photo
5 The Sands				55°57′16″N 2°46′23″W	Category C(S)	34365	Upload Photo
Hadley Court Sidegate				55°57′12″N 2°46′29″W	Category B	34379	Upload Photo
Maitlandfield Hotel Sidegate				55°57′10″N 2°46′31″W	Category B	34380	Upload Photo
Tyne Park House Poldrate				55°57′08″N 2°46′23″W	Category B	34398	Upload Photo
Waterloo Bridge				55°57′03″N 2°46′25″W	Category B	34399	Upload Photo
Templeton's Corn Mill Poldrate				55°57′07″N 2°46′26″W	Category B	34401	Upload another image See more images
Malt Buildings Poldrate				55°57′06″N 2°46′27″W	Category B	34403	Upload Photo
Tyneside Tavern Buildings Poldrate				55°57′07″N 2°46′28″W	Category C(S)	34405	Upload Photo
Tenterfield House Dunbar Road				55°57′30″N 2°46′37″W	Category B	34430	Upload Photo
25 Dunbar Road				55°57′36″N 2°46′37″W	Category C(S)	34433	Upload Photo
27 Dunbar Road				55°57′36″N 2°46′37″W	Category B	34434	Upload Photo
Eastwood Off Newton Port				55°57′24″N 2°46′36″W	Category B	34437	Upload Photo
Fairfields Newton Port				55°57′26″N 2°46′40″W	Category C(S)	34438	Upload Photo
Florabank House Florabank Road				55°57′32″N 2°46′47″W	Category C(S)	34439	Upload Photo
Ferguson Monument West End				55°57′19″N 2°47′06″W	Category B	34448	Upload another image See more images
3, 4 West End				55°57′20″N 2°47′04″W	Category B	34455	Upload Photo
54 High Street, Seed Merchants				55°57′19″N 2°46′44″W	Category C(S)	34243	Upload Photo
The Pend House 1A Court St. Haddington				55°57′19″N 2°46′46″W	Category C(S)	34250	Upload Photo
St Helen's Paterson Place				55°57′16″N 2°46′46″W	Category B	34253	Upload Photo
29 Court Street				55°57′19″N 2°46′54″W	Category B	34265	Upload Photo
Lyndhurst 33 Court Street				55°57′19″N 2°46′55″W	Category B	34267	Upload Photo
2, 4, 6, Court St				55°57′21″N 2°46′45″W	Category C(S)	34291	Upload Photo
Drinking Fountain Court Street				55°57′20″N 2°46′49″W	Category C(S)	34293	Upload Photo
45, 46 Market Street				55°57′21″N 2°46′43″W	Category B	34295	Upload Photo
34, 35, 36 Market Street				55°57′21″N 2°46′41″W	Category B	34299	Upload Photo
14, 15 Market St				55°57′22″N 2°46′35″W	Category B	34311	Upload Photo
77 Market Street				55°57′21″N 2°46′33″W	Category B	34320	Upload Photo
68, 69 Market Street				55°57′20″N 2°46′36″W	Category B	34325	Upload Photo
8, 9, 10 Hardgate				55°57′20″N 2°46′29″W	Category C(S)	34342	Upload Photo
14 Hardgate				55°57′21″N 2°46′29″W	Category B	34344	Upload Photo
15 Hardgate				55°57′21″N 2°46′29″W	Category C(S)	34345	Upload Photo
Building At Rear Of 13, 14 High Street				55°57′18″N 2°46′33″W	Category B	34215	Upload Photo
23, 24 High Street				55°57′19″N 2°46′35″W	Category B	34223	Upload Photo
Building At Rear Of 31 High Street				55°57′18″N 2°46′36″W	Category B	34228	Upload Photo
40, 41, 42 High Street				55°57′19″N 2°46′39″W	Category B	34233	Upload Photo
Huntington House Stables				55°57′52″N 2°49′33″W	Category C(S)	13199	Upload Photo
West Bearford Farmhouse				55°56′59″N 2°43′41″W	Category C(S)	10822	Upload Photo
Aberlady Road, Herdmanflatt Hospital, Ancillary Building				55°57′36″N 2°47′14″W	Category C(S)	48293	Upload Photo
Byres Steading, Cartshed And Granary				55°58′57″N 2°48′43″W	Category C(S)	43533	Upload Photo
East Bearford Bridge				55°57′47″N 2°43′07″W	Category C(S)	43541	Upload Photo
East Bearford Farmhouse				55°57′44″N 2°42′49″W	Category C(S)	43542	Upload Photo
Lennoxlove House, West Lodge				55°56′10″N 2°47′36″W	Category C(S)	43551	Upload Photo
Ugston Old Farm				55°57′46″N 2°48′48″W	Category A	43560	Upload Photo
Trinity College Tyne Close At Rear Of Church Hall				55°57′19″N 2°46′27″W	Category B	34358	Upload Photo
2 The Sands				55°57′17″N 2°46′24″W	Category B	34363	Upload Photo
Summerfield House Sidegate				55°57′14″N 2°46′30″W	Category B	34376	Upload Photo
1 St Ann's Place				55°57′18″N 2°46′29″W	Category B	34384	Upload Photo
Haddington House Sidegate Lamp Of The Lothian, Collegiate Centre				55°57′15″N 2°46′28″W	Category A	34388	Upload another image
Doocot Lady Kitty's Garden				55°57′16″N 2°46′21″W	Category B	34393	Upload Photo
Bridge Youth Club 11 Poldrate				55°57′07″N 2°46′29″W	Category B	34404	Upload Photo
Haddington Maltings				55°57′03″N 2°46′45″W	Category C(S)	34408	Upload Photo
Holme Cottage Distillery Park				55°57′02″N 2°46′54″W	Category B	34410	Upload Photo
St Martin's Chapel Bullet Loan				55°57′22″N 2°46′07″W	Category B	34426	Upload Photo
8 Florabank Road				55°57′32″N 2°46′47″W	Category C(S)	34441	Upload Photo
The Hollies Station Road West End				55°57′11″N 2°47′08″W	Category B	34459	Upload Photo
House At Rear Of 43 High Street				55°57′18″N 2°46′39″W	Category B	34235	Upload Photo
50, 51, High Street Carlyle House				55°57′19″N 2°46′42″W	Category A	34239	Upload Photo
27 Court Street				55°57′19″N 2°46′53″W	Category B	34261	Upload Photo
West Church (C Of S) Court Street (Former Free Church)				55°57′20″N 2°47′00″W	Category B	34275	Upload Photo
Tower Of Former Church St John's West Court Street				55°57′20″N 2°47′00″W	Category C(S)	34277	Upload Photo
48 Court Street				55°57′20″N 2°46′54″W	Category B	34280	Upload Photo
Bank Of Scotland Court Street				55°57′21″N 2°46′54″W	Category A	34281	Upload another image
32 Court Street Royal Bank Of Scotland				55°57′21″N 2°46′50″W	Category B	34285	Upload Photo
3, 4 Mitchell's Close Off Market Street				55°57′22″N 2°46′38″W	Category B	34305	Upload Photo
4, 4B Market Street				55°57′22″N 2°46′32″W	Category B	34317	Upload Photo
63 Market Street				55°57′20″N 2°46′37″W	Category C(S)	34328	Upload Photo
Warehouse Kilpair Street At Rear Of 85 High Street				55°57′20″N 2°46′33″W	Category C(S)	34331	Upload Photo
1-7 Brown Street At Rear Of 90 High Street				55°57′20″N 2°46′32″W	Category B	34333	Upload Photo
57, 58 High Street				55°57′20″N 2°46′42″W	Category B	34186	Upload Photo
72 High Street				55°57′20″N 2°46′37″W	Category B	34193	Upload Photo
George Hotel High Street				55°57′20″N 2°46′31″W	Category B	34204	Upload Photo
92, 93A And 93B High Street				55°57′19″N 2°46′31″W	Category B	34205	Upload Photo
Lennoxlove House, Sundial				55°56′20″N 2°46′38″W	Category A	10815	Upload Photo
Abbey Bridge				55°57′42″N 2°44′58″W	Category A	10820	Upload another image
Amisfield Gothic Lodge				55°57′59″N 2°45′24″W	Category B	43527	Upload Photo
Amisfield Park Boundary Walls				55°57′51″N 2°45′05″W	Category C(S)	43529	Upload Photo
Myreside				55°55′04″N 2°44′28″W	Category C(S)	43554	Upload Photo
Seggarsdean Reservoir				55°57′02″N 2°44′10″W	Category C(S)	43556	Upload Photo
Minto Cottage West Road				55°57′14″N 2°47′56″W	Category C(S)	34467	Upload Photo
The Rectory Church Street				55°57′19″N 2°46′26″W	Category B	34359	Upload Photo
3, 4 Sidegate				55°57′18″N 2°46′30″W	Category B	34368	Upload Photo
8 St Ann's Place				55°57′18″N 2°46′29″W	Category B	34382	Upload Photo
32, 34 Sidegate				55°57′16″N 2°46′29″W	Category B	34386	Upload Photo
30 Sidegate				55°57′16″N 2°46′28″W	Category C(S)	34387	Upload Photo
Adam Paterson Mill, West Mills Distillery Park				55°57′03″N 2°46′55″W	Category B	34412	Upload Photo
St Fillans St Martin's Gate				55°57′22″N 2°46′09″W	Category C(S)	34425	Upload Photo
6 Florabank Road				55°57′31″N 2°46′47″W	Category C(S)	34440	Upload Photo
Somnerfield Cottage Hospital Road				55°57′21″N 2°47′27″W	Category C(S)	34462	Upload Photo
48, 49 High Street Bank Of Scotland				55°57′18″N 2°46′41″W	Category B	34238	Upload another image
53 High Street				55°57′19″N 2°46′44″W	Category C(S)	34242	Upload Photo
Cross, High Street				55°57′19″N 2°46′35″W	Category B	34245	Upload Photo
3, 4, 5 Lodge Street				55°57′19″N 2°46′43″W	Category B	34248	Upload Photo
1 Court Street				55°57′19″N 2°46′46″W	Category B	34254	Upload Photo
Corn Exchange Court Street				55°57′18″N 2°46′49″W	Category B	34257	Upload another image
Hilton Lodge Court Street				55°57′21″N 2°46′59″W	Category B	34276	Upload Photo
Post Office 52 Court Street				55°57′20″N 2°46′54″W	Category B	34279	Upload Photo
29(Part) And 30 Market Street				55°57′21″N 2°46′40″W	Category B	34301	Upload Photo
28 And 29 Market Street				55°57′21″N 2°46′39″W	Category B	34302	Upload Photo
7, 8 Market Street				55°57′22″N 2°46′33″W	Category A	34315	Upload Photo
Kinloch Or Gilmerton House 1 Market Street				55°57′23″N 2°46′32″W	Category B	34319	Upload Photo
59, 60 High Street				55°57′20″N 2°46′41″W	Category B	34187	Upload Photo
64, 65 High Street				55°57′20″N 2°46′40″W	Category B	34189	Upload Photo
69, 70, 71 High Street				55°57′20″N 2°46′38″W	Category B	34192	Upload Photo
House At Rear Of 78 High Street				55°57′20″N 2°46′36″W	Category B	34197	Upload Photo
27, 28 High Street				55°57′19″N 2°46′36″W	Category B	34225	Upload Photo
Building At Rear Of 29, 30 High Street				55°57′18″N 2°46′36″W	Category B	34227	Upload Photo
Alderston Coach House, With Kennels				55°57′42″N 2°48′11″W	Category A	10835	Upload Photo
1 And 2 Mitchell's Close (Off Market Street)				55°57′22″N 2°46′39″W	Category B	48152	Upload Photo
Westfield House, With Gatepiers And Boundary Wall				55°56′01″N 2°48′06″W	Category B	43563	Upload Photo
Camptoun House, Camptoun Lodge And East Gates				55°59′21″N 2°47′49″W	Category B	43536	Upload Photo
Town Walls				55°57′28″N 2°46′38″W	Category C(S)	34468	Upload Photo
13, 14, 15, 16 Church Street				55°57′17″N 2°46′26″W	Category B	34352	Upload Photo
2 Church Street Corner Of Hardgate				55°57′19″N 2°46′29″W	Category B	34355	Upload Photo
38 Sidegate				55°57′18″N 2°46′29″W	Category B	34381	Upload Photo
Appleloft Haddington House Sidegate				55°57′15″N 2°46′25″W	Category B	34389	Upload Photo
St Mary's Catholic Church Poldrate				55°57′09″N 2°46′25″W	Category B	34397	Upload Photo
1 Bridge Street				55°57′18″N 2°46′16″W	Category B	34415	Upload Photo
House And Shop Bridge Street				55°57′17″N 2°46′12″W	Category C(S)	34417	Upload Photo
Victoria Bridge Over River Tyne, Victoria Terrace				55°57′23″N 2°46′25″W	Category B	34422	Upload Photo
Cottages St Martins Close J Robertson Smiddy				55°57′21″N 2°46′19″W	Category C(S)	34423	Upload Photo
Gimmers Mill				55°57′24″N 2°46′21″W	Category B	34428	Upload Photo
16 Florabank Road				55°57′32″N 2°46′47″W	Category C(S)	34442	Upload Photo
Templedean Hall(Formerly Children's Home) Off Herdmanflatt				55°57′38″N 2°46′49″W	Category B	34443	Upload Photo
Rosehall Foundry, Haddington				55°57′14″N 2°47′18″W	Category C(S)	34452	Upload Photo
1 West End				55°57′20″N 2°47′03″W	Category C(S)	34453	Upload Photo
2 West End				55°57′20″N 2°47′03″W	Category C(S)	34454	Upload Photo
Warehouse Next To 54 High Street				55°57′19″N 2°46′45″W	Category B	34244	Upload Photo
1, 2 Lodge Street				55°57′19″N 2°46′43″W	Category B	34246	Upload Photo
Plough Tavern Court Street				55°57′19″N 2°46′48″W	Category B	34256	Upload Photo
County Buildings Court Street				55°57′18″N 2°46′51″W	Category B	34260	Upload another image
57 Court Street				55°57′19″N 2°47′01″W	Category C(S)	34271	Upload Photo
54, 56 Court Street				55°57′20″N 2°46′56″W	Category B	34278	Upload Photo
40 Court Street				55°57′20″N 2°46′51″W	Category C(S)	34282	Upload Photo
39, 40, 41 Market Street				55°57′21″N 2°46′42″W	Category B	34297	Upload Photo
26, 27 Market St				55°57′21″N 2°46′39″W	Category A	34303	Upload Photo
5, 6 Mitchell's Close Off Market Street				55°57′22″N 2°46′39″W	Category B	34304	Upload Photo
16 Market Street				55°57′22″N 2°46′36″W	Category B	34310	Upload Photo
12 Market Street (Off Market St)				55°57′22″N 2°46′34″W	Category B	34313	Upload Photo
Gardner's Arms Adjoining No 73 Market Street				55°57′21″N 2°46′34″W	Category B	34322	Upload Photo
1 Kilpair Street				55°57′21″N 2°46′33″W	Category C(S)	34330	Upload Photo
Warehouse Kilpair Street At Rear Of 77 Market Street				55°57′21″N 2°46′33″W	Category B	34335	Upload Photo
1 And 2 Hardgate				55°57′19″N 2°46′29″W	Category B	34338	Upload Photo
3 Hardgate				55°57′19″N 2°46′29″W	Category B	34339	Upload Photo
6, 7 Hardgate				55°57′20″N 2°46′29″W	Category B	34341	Upload Photo
78 High Street				55°57′20″N 2°46′36″W	Category B	34196	Upload Photo
88, 89 High Street				55°57′20″N 2°46′33″W	Category B	34202	Upload Photo
Building At Rear Of 9 High Street				55°57′18″N 2°46′32″W	Category B	34211	Upload Photo
10, 11 High Street				55°57′18″N 2°46′32″W	Category B	34212	Upload Photo
Building At Rear Of 10, 11 High Street				55°57′18″N 2°46′32″W	Category B	34213	Upload Photo
Building At Rear Of 15 High Street				55°57′18″N 2°46′33″W	Category B	34217	Upload Photo
19, 20 High Street				55°57′19″N 2°46′34″W	Category B	34219	Upload Photo
25, 26 High Street				55°57′19″N 2°46′35″W	Category B	34224	Upload Photo
32 High Street				55°57′19″N 2°46′37″W	Category B	34229	Upload Photo
35, 36 High Street				55°57′19″N 2°46′37″W	Category B	34231	Upload Photo
Aberlady Road, Herdmanflatt Hospital				55°57′36″N 2°47′12″W	Category C(S)	48292	Upload Photo

== Key ==
The scheme for classifying buildings in Scotland is:

- Category A: "buildings of national or international importance, either architectural or historic; or fine, little-altered examples of some particular period, style or building type."
- Category B: "buildings of regional or more than local importance; or major examples of some particular period, style or building type, which may have been altered."
- Category C: "buildings of local importance; lesser examples of any period, style, or building type, as originally constructed or moderately altered; and simple traditional buildings which group well with other listed buildings."

In March 2016 there were 47,288 listed buildings in Scotland. Of these, 8% were Category A, and 50% were Category B, with the remaining 42% being Category C.

== See also ==
- List of listed buildings in East Lothian
