= Corn Exchange, Haddington =

Commercial building in Haddington, East Lothian, Scotland

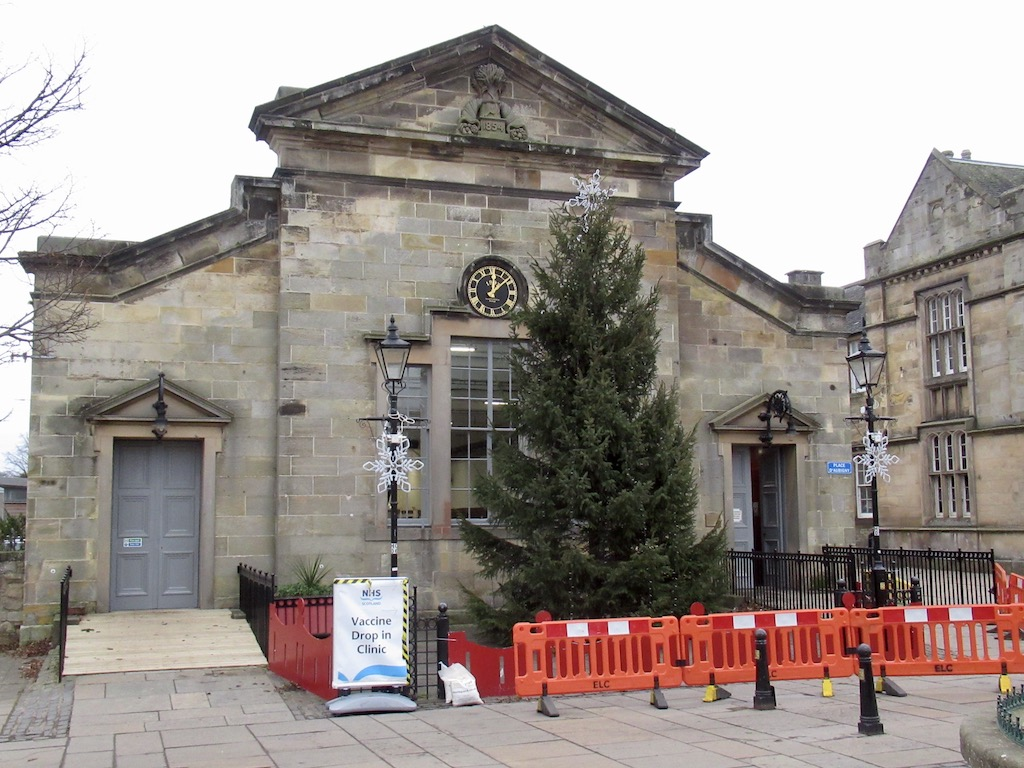
- Corn Exchange, Haddington

- Shown in East Lothian
- 55.9552°N 2.7804°W
- Location: Court Street, Haddington

History
- Built: 1854

Site notes
- Architect: Francis Farquharson
- Architectural style: Neoclassical style

Listed Building – Category B
- Official name: Corn Exchange, Court Street, Haddington
- Designated: 5 December 1977
- Reference no.: LB34257

The Corn Exchange is a commercial building in Court Street, Haddington, East Lothian, Scotland. The structure, which is now used as a community events venue, is a Category B listed building.

== History ==
Until the mid-19th century, corn merchants conducted their trade under the arches of the Town House. By the mid-19th century, this arrangement was deemed inadequate, and civic leaders decided to commission a dedicated corn exchange on a site to the east of the Sheriff Courthouse.

The building was designed by Francis Farquharson in the neoclassical style, built in ashlar stone and was completed in 1854. The design involved a symmetrical main frontage of three bays facing onto Court Street. The central bay featured a Venetian window with an architrave and a hood mould surmounted by a clock, while the outer bays contained doorways with architraves, triangular pediments and wrought iron lamp brackets. The central bay was surmounted by a raised pediment with a carving of a wheat sheaf in the tympanum. Internally, the principal room was the main hall which stretched back behind the main frontage.

The use of the building as a corn exchange declined significantly in the wake of the Great Depression of British Agriculture in the late 19th century. It was subsequently used as a community events venue and, during the First World War and the Second World War, it served as billeting for soldiers.

In June 2014, the management of the building was transferred from East Lothian Council to the newly formed Haddington Community Development Trust. An extensive programme of refurbishment works, undertaken by Maxi Construction at a cost of £800,000 to a design by Summers Inman, started on site in spring 2019. The work was paused while the building was used as a vaccination centre during the COVID-19 pandemic in the United Kingdom. After the work was adapted to allow the Brunton Theatre Trust to use the corn exchange for theatrical performances, the building re-opened to the public again in October 2023.

== See also ==
- List of listed buildings in Haddington, East Lothian
