= County Buildings, Haddington =

Courthouse in Haddington, Scotland

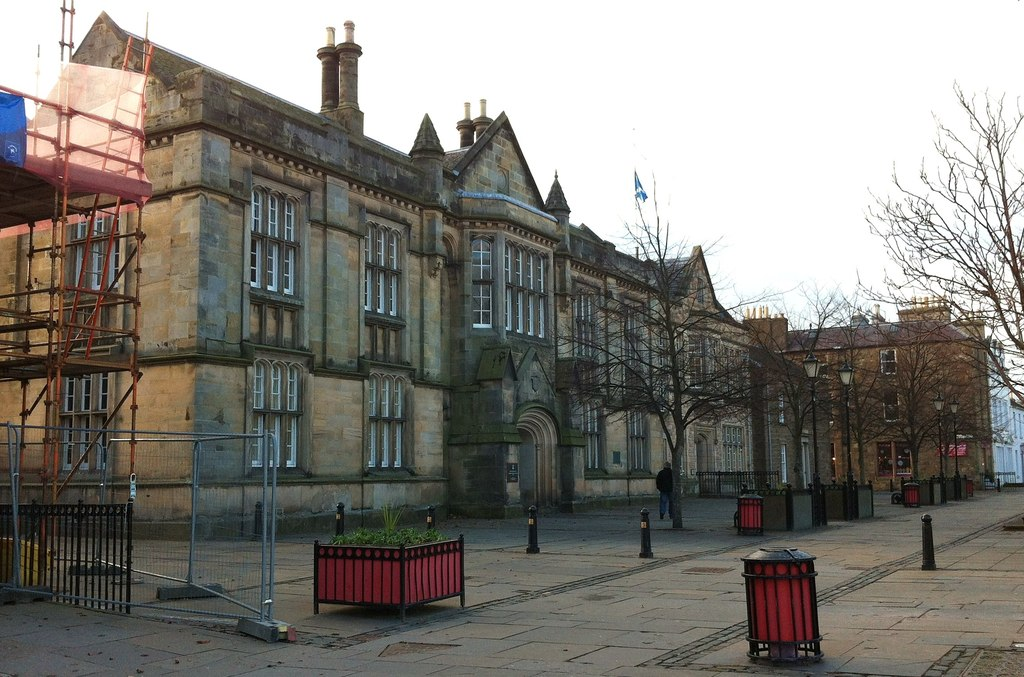
- County Buildings, Haddington

- Shown in East Lothian
- 55.9551°N 2.7810°W
- Location: Court Street, Haddington

History
- Built: 1833

Site notes
- Architect: William Burn
- Architectural style: Gothic Revival style

Listed Building – Category B
- Official name: Haddington County Buildings including rear wings and former villa at 27 Court Street and excluding flat roofed block to southeast and pitched quadrangle to south (John Muir House), Court Street, Haddington
- Designated: 5 December 1977
- Reference no.: LB34260

County Buildings is a municipal structure in Court Street, Haddington, East Lothian, Scotland. The structure, which was the headquarters of East Lothian County Council and was also used as a courthouse, is a Category B listed building.

== History ==
Until the early part of the 19th century, court hearings in East Lothian (then called Haddingtonshire) were held in a room on the first floor of the Haddington Town House in Court Street. However, in 1831, it was decided to commission a dedicated courthouse: the site the sheriff selected had originally been occupied by the 12th century Palace of Haddington but was later occupied by an early 19th century villa which was retained and integrated into the new structure.

The foundation stone for the new building was laid by Sir John Gordon Sinclair, 8th Baronet on 27 May 1833. It was designed by William Burn in the Gothic Revival style, built by Messrs Balsillie in ashlar stone at a cost of £5,250 and was completed later that year. The design involved a symmetrical main frontage of five bays facing onto Court Street. The central bay, which was slightly projected forward, featured an arched doorway with a gablet roof on the ground floor and a prominent oriel window on the first floor. The central bay was flanked by lancet windows on both floors and by octagonal turrets on the first floor. The outer bays were fenestrated by tri-partite mullioned windows on both floors. At roof level, there was a modillioned cornice and a parapet. Internally, the principal room was the courtroom on the first floor where the sheriff presided.

A monument, in the form of a bust on a well surmounted by an open crown, intended to commemorate the life of the Arthur Hay, 9th Marquess of Tweeddale was designed by David Rhind, built in red sandstone and was installed in front of the building in 1880.

Following the implementation of the Local Government (Scotland) Act 1889, which established county councils in every county, the new county leaders needed to identify offices for Haddingtonshire County Council. The new county council established its offices in the courthouse.

In April 1921 the county council voted to request a change of the county's name from Haddingtonshire to East Lothian. The government agreed and brought the change into effect as part of the East Lothian County Buildings Order Confirmation Act 1921, which received royal assent on 8 November 1921. The act also transferred ownership of the County Buildings to the county council. Shortly after the council took ownership of the building they extended it to the west by an additional block, designed by J M Dick Peddie & W J Walker Todd in a similar style, which was completed in 1932. Another extension adding a wing to the rear was completed in 1956.

After the abolition of East Lothian County Council in 1975, the courtroom continued to be used for hearings of the sheriff court and, on one day a month, for hearings of the justice of the peace court. The modern part of the complex, at the rear, became the main offices of East Lothian District Council. Later extensions included a wing to the southeast in the 1970s, and a wing to the southwest, known as "John Muir House", in the 1990s.

Despite a local campaign to keep the sheriff court open, hearings were moved to Edinburgh and the sheriff court closed in January 2015. Ownership of the sheriff court was transferred free of charge to East Lothian Council later that year. In March 2019, it was announced that the former sheriff court would be brought back into use as a local hub for the police.

== See also ==
- List of listed buildings in Haddington, East Lothian
