= Poldrate Mill =

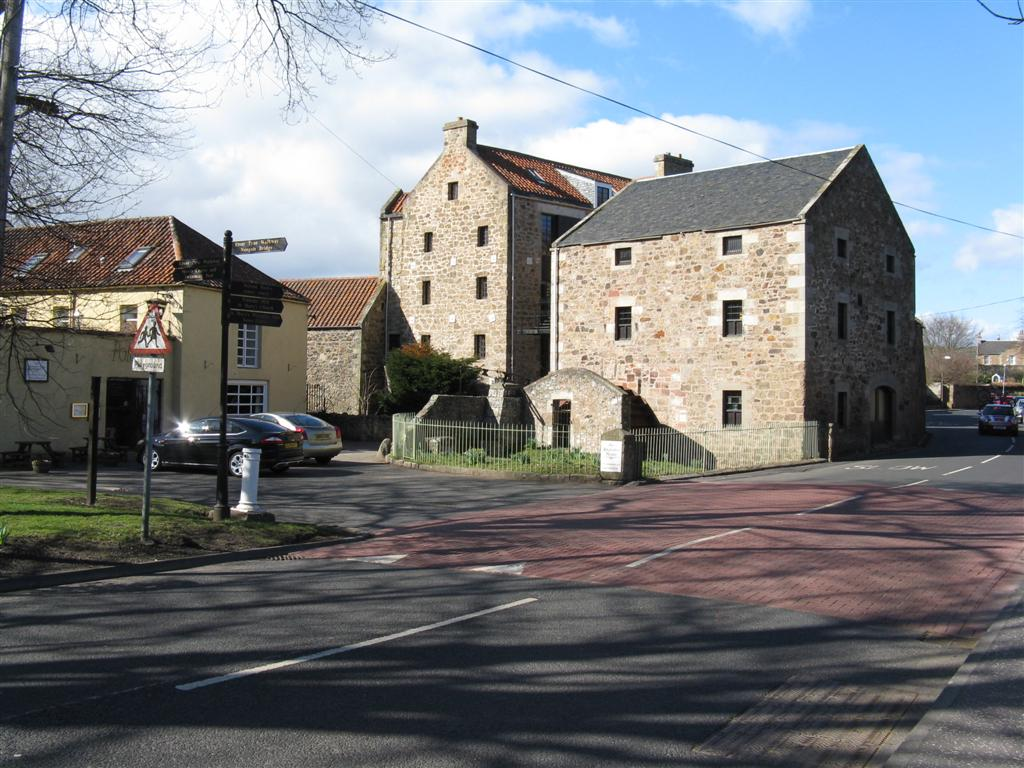
- Interactive map of Poldrate Mill
- 55°57′06″N 2°46′26″W
- Location: Haddington, East Lothian, Scotland

History
- Built: ca. 18th century

Site notes
- Restored: 1968
- Owner: Lamp of Lothian Trust

Listed Building – Category B
- Official name: Templeton's Corn Mill Poldrate
- Designated: 5 December 1977
- Reference no.: LB34401

Poldrate Mill is a historic watermill located on River Tyne at the southern boundary of Haddington, in the council area of East Lothian, Scotland.

== History ==
Built on the site of the mediaeval Kirk Mill, the present buildings are largely 18th century, and adjacent is the Waterloo Bridge built in 1815.

The site was previously owned by the Morrison family, and was responsible for the production of flour until its closure in 1965, and what remains is the only one of Haddington's three mills which still displays much of its traditional form, which includes the mill that was reconstructed in 1842.

Restoration for the mill was carried out in 1968 by the Lamp of Lothian Trust, and the site today provides a meeting hall gallery, serving as an important community centre with social, educational, and recreational facilities for the town

On 5 December 1977 it became a Category B listed building.
