= Musselburgh Grammar School =

Location
- 86 Inveresk Road; Musselburgh, East Lothian, EH21 7BA; Scotland; 55°56′20″N 3°03′03″W

Information
- Type: Secondary State School
- Established: 1626
- Headteacher: Jodie Hannan
- Gender: Co-educational
- Age: 11 to 18
- Enrolment: 1,100 (approx)
- Houses: Caird, Grange, Moray, Seton (abolished in 2011)
- Colours: Cobalt Blue, Navy and White.
- Values: honesty, determination, respect
- HMIE Report: HMIE Report 2014
- Telephone: 0131 665 4278
- Website: https://sites.google.com/edubuzz.org/musselburgh-grammar-school/home

Musselburgh Grammar School a state-funded secondary school in Musselburgh, East Lothian, Scotland, founded in 1626. It serves as the main secondary school for Musselburgh and the surrounding areas of Wallyford and Whitecraig. The school dates back to the sixteenth century. Until the 1950s, Musselburgh Grammar was a fee-paying school. In 2005, the school's roll was 1310. Jodie Hannan is the current head teacher.

== Primary schools ==
There are four nearby primary schools which feed into Musselburgh Grammar School: Stoneyhill Primary School, Campie Primary School, Musselburgh Burgh Primary School and Whitecraig Primary School. Until 2023, and the opening of the new Rosehill High School in Wallyford, Pupils from Pinkie Primary School and Wallyford Primary School also attended Musselburgh Grammar.

== HMIE reports ==
In June 1999 the school was criticised following a Care and Welfare Inspection by Her Majesty's Inspectorate of Education. The report referred to having witnessed a battle between rival gangs in the school entrance area and that a third of pupils surveyed feared for their own safety. It also mentioned general weaknesses in safety, security, care and welfare, although the staff were praised for their efforts in the face of serious challenges. This led to a media furore with some newspapers describing the school as the worst in Scotland.

A follow-up inspection in 2000 reported that the school and East Lothian Council had "responded promptly" and made "very good progress" in tackling the problems identified. The school also underwent a refurbishment of facilities between 2004 and 2005 under the PPP Scheme.

The 2014 HMIE report expressed concern at the level of attainment of pupils, but in 2015, inspectors noted that the school had made improvements in this area and elsewhere.

== House system ==
The school has a house system, which divides all pupils in the school into three different Houses when they start. The three houses are called Caird, Grange, and Moray.

There was a fourth house in the school called Seton which disbanded in 2011. House assemblies are held weekly and pupils enter a wide range of activities between Houses during the school year.

== Notable former pupils ==
- Rhona Cameron, comedian and writer
- Susan Deacon, former Scottish Labour Party Member of the Scottish Parliament and Minister for Heath and Community Care until 2001.
- David Macbeth Moir, physician and writer
- Callum Beattie, singer-songwriter
- Callum Kerr, actor
- Gary Anderson, professional darts player
- Alex Hay, professional golfer, writer and former BBC sports commentator
- Kenny Miller, football player
- Colin Nish, football player
- Jason Holt, football player
- Kris Renton, football player
- Kevin Smith, football player
- Alan Morgan, football player
- Kirsten Reilly, football player
- Billy Brown, football player and manager
- Jim Jefferies, football player and manager
- John McGlynn, football player and manager
- Ross Muir, professional snooker player
- Jock Wallace Jr., football player and manager
- Gordon Hunter, football player
- Yvonne Murray, middle and long-distance runner
- Robert Black, serial killer
