= Flag of East Lothian =

East Lothian
- Proportion: 3:5
- Adopted: 13 December 2018
- Designed by: Archie Martin

The East Lothian flag is the flag of the Scottish Council of East Lothian (Haddingtonshire). It was registered with the Flag Institute on 13 December 2018 following its announcement at a reception hosted by the Lord Provost.

== Design ==
This saltire design on blue reflects the local birthplace of the national flag, with the cross in gold signifying the wealth of the county's farmlands and reputation as the granary of Scotland. The lion rampant is a traditional emblem of the county – it appears in many local coats of arms while King William the Lion was born in the royal palace in Haddington. The blue stripes through the gold represent the rivers Esk and Tyne.

== Competition ==
Run jointly by East Lothian Council and the Scottish Flag Trust, in association with the Lord Lyon and the East Lothian Courier, the competition was open to anyone. More than 620 entries were received from across the county, elsewhere in the UK and even as far afield as the United States and New Zealand. The judging panel comprised the Lord Lieutenant of East Lothian; the Lord Lyon; the Provost and chief executive of East Lothian Council; the chairman of the Scottish Flag Trust; and the editor of the East Lothian Courier. Four flag designs were shortlisted for the public vote, with the winning design announced on 13 December 2018.

Design A

The winning design.

Design B

The three horizontal bands represent the key industries of the county – blue for the sea and fishing, yellow for the beaches and tourism, and green for the farming. In the centre is a map outline of East Lothian (although it notably uses the boundaries of the modern council area, rather than those of the traditional county which the flag was intended to represent) defaced with a fluttering Saint Andrew's saltire, as a homage to East Lothian's status as the birthplace of the Scottish flag.

Design C

The curved blue band represents the importance of the sea to East Lothian, while the curved green band stands for the rolling countryside and the Lammermuirs. In the canton is a white Saint Andrew's saltire (one of the arms of which resembles a beam of light), to acknowledge the county being the birthplace of the national flag of Scotland.

Design D

The gold lion rampant is a traditional emblem of East Lothian, appearing on the coat of arms of the modern council area as well as on the arms of a number of the county's ancient families. The white Saint Andrew's saltire symbolises the local origins of Scotland's flag. The blue stripe stands for the sea off East Lothian's coast, the yellow stripe for the county's beaches and the green stripe for its rich farmland.

== See also ==
- List of Scottish flags
- List of British flags
