= Hopes Reservoir =

Reservoir in the United Kingdom

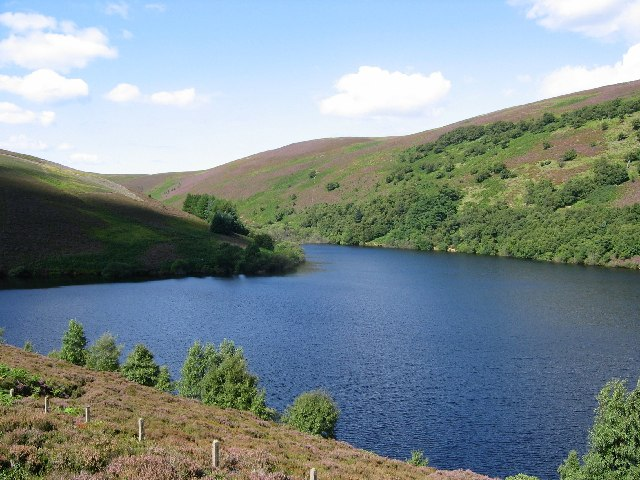

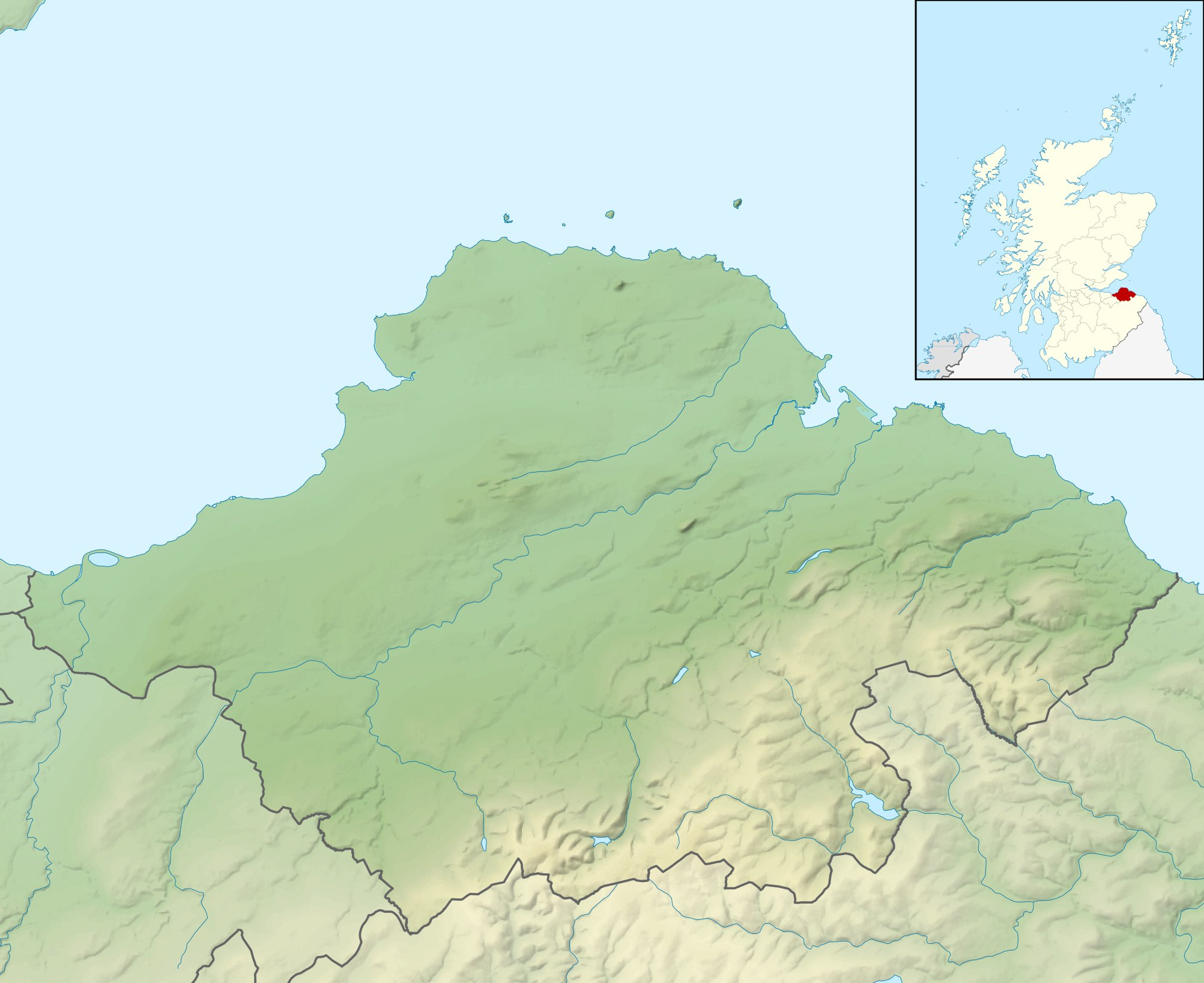
- Location within East Lothian
- Location: East Lothian, Scotland
- Coordinates: 55°50′56″N 2°43′30″W
- Type: reservoir
- Basin countries: United Kingdom
- Surface area: 16.5 ha (41 acres)

Hopes Reservoir is a small reservoir in East Lothian, Scotland, in the Lammermuir Hills. It is located in the parish of Yester, 6 km (3.7 mi) south of the village of Gifford and 1 km (0.62 mi) east of the hill Lammer Law. It is fed by the Hopes Water which flows northwards from the reservoir to join the Coulston Water, a tributary of the River Tyne, 1.5 km (0.93 mi) southeast of Gifford. The reservoir was opened in 1933 and the embankment that dams the Hopes Water was created using the rubble of Edinburgh's Calton Jail, which was demolished in 1930 to make way for St Andrews House. The reservoir is a drinking water supply reservoir operated by Scottish Water.

The reservoir is stocked with brown trout (Salmo trutta), in 1957 the East Lothian Angling Association gifted the Water Board (predecessor of Scottish Water) trout fry to stock the Reservoir. and the moorland surrounding the reservoir has red grouse (Lagopus lagopus scoticus). In 2020 a white-tailed eagle released on the Isle of Wight the previous year spent much of the summer in East Lothian including around Hopes Reservoir.

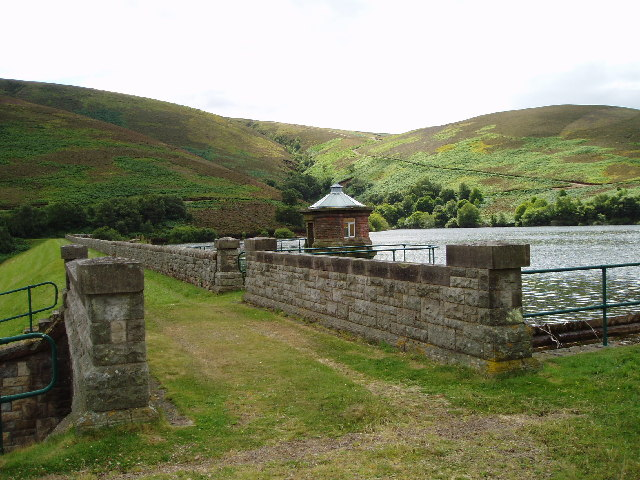
Hopes Reservoir Dam

== Parking controversy ==
In 2023 East Lothian Council granted retrospective planning permission, despite objections from residents, for the neighbouring estate, Moorfoot Estates Ltd, to charge for parking. The estate claimed that they had to deal with anti-social behaviour from visitors to the reservoir. Permits for parking can be purchased in Gifford. However, Scottish Water allows the public to use their car park at no charge.

== See also ==
- List of reservoirs and dams in the United Kingdom
- List of places in East Lothian
