= Billy Brown (footballer, born 1950) =

Scottish footballer and coach

Personal information
- Date of birth: 20 December 1950 (age 75)
- Place of birth: Musselburgh, Scotland
- Position: Defender

Youth career
- 1966–1970: Hull City

Senior career*
Years	Team	Apps	(Gls)
1970–1973	Motherwell	28	(1)
1973–1978	Raith Rovers	92	(5)
1978–1979	Newtongrange Star		
1979–1984	Musselburgh Athletic		
Total		101	(5)

Managerial career
- 1988–1990: Berwick Rangers (assistant)
- 1990–1995: Falkirk (assistant)
- 1995–2000: Heart of Midlothian (assistant)
- 2000–2001: Bradford City (assistant)
- 2002–2010: Kilmarnock (assistant)
- 2010–2011: Heart of Midlothian (assistant)
- 2011: Hibernian (caretaker)
- 2011–2012: Hibernian (assistant)
- 2012–2013: East Fife
- 2013–2014: Heart of Midlothian (assistant)
- 2017: Cowdenbeath
- * Club domestic league appearances and goals

Billy Brown (born on 20 December 1950) is a Scottish football coach and former player. He has managed East Fife and Cowdenbeath and played in the Scottish Football League for Motherwell and Raith Rovers. He then became a football coach, working at Berwick Rangers, Falkirk, Hearts, Bradford City and Kilmarnock with longtime colleague Jim Jefferies.

== Club career ==
Brown was born in Musselburgh and began his career at Hull City. He later played for Motherwell and Raith Rovers. His senior playing career was Cut short at age 28 due to a cruciate ligament injury. Brown continued to play at junior level with Newtongrange Star and Musselburgh Athletic where he became a coach

== Managerial career ==
Billy Brown became the assistant manager to Jim Jefferies an old school friend from Musselburgh Grammar School, at Berwick Rangers in 1988. Since then, he followed Jefferies to Falkirk, Hearts, Bradford city and Kilmarnock. After leaving Kilmarnock with Jefferies in January 2010, Brown and Jefferies returned to Hearts soon afterwards. Jefferies and Brown were sacked by Hearts on August 1, 2011.

In September 2011, Brown was appointed as the assistant manager at Hibernian . He was made the caretaker manager of the club after the dismissal of Colin Calderwood in November and was interviewed for the job. Pat Fenlon was appointed manager, but Brown remained the assistant manager until June 2012, when his contract expired.

Brown was appointed manager of East Fife in November 2012. Although East Fife struggled during the 2012–13 season, the club won the Scottish Second Division play-offs to stay in the third tier. On 5 June 2013, it was reported that Brown had parted ways with East Fife, one month after a widely publicised post-match interview where he angrily criticised the club's fans following a defeat to Stenhousemuir FC.

Brown then returned to Hearts, working as an unpaid assistant to manager Gary Locke. Hearts had recently entered administration and could not afford to offer a salary to an assistant coach. Brown was given a paid short-term contract in September 2013. In January 2014, Brown was informed that his contract would not be renewed. However, after a delegation of Hearts' players met the club administrators, Brown was subsequently given another contract. Brown and Locke left Hearts at the end of the season, after Ann Budge took control of the club.

In 2017, Brown assisted Gary Locke during his time as manager of Cowdenbeath. When Locke left Cowdenbeath in July 2017 to take an ambassadorial role with Hearts, Brown was appointed as the manager of Cowdenbeath. However, with the side 10th in the league after one win in 10 matches, Brown resigned from his position on 31 October 2017.

=== Manager ===
As of 28 October 2017

Team	Nat	From	To	Record				
Team	Nat	From	To	G	W	D	L	Win %
East Fife	(Scotland)	November 2012	5 June 2013	30	8	8	14	26.67
Cowdenbeath	(Scotland)	1 July 2017	31 October 2017	16	2	2	12	12.50
Total				46	10	10	26	21.74
