= Whitecraig =

Village in East Lothian, Scotland

Coordinates: 55.923°N 3.034°W

Whitecraig: Scottish Gaelic: A' Charraig Gheal
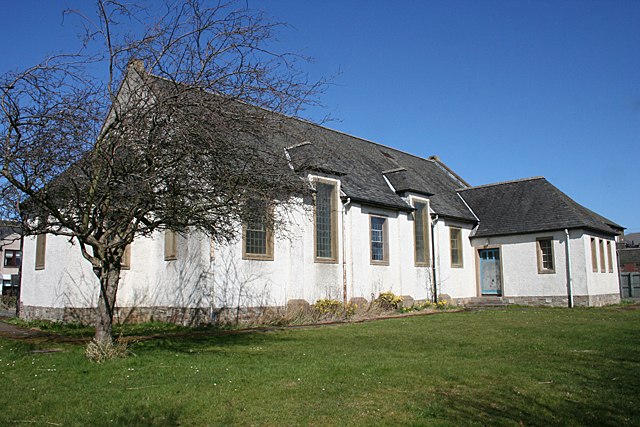
- St. John's Kirk, Whitecraig

- Location within East Lothian
- Population: 1,330 (2020)
- OS grid reference: NT354704
- Civil parish: Inveresk
- Council area: East Lothian
- Lieutenancy area: East Lothian
- Country: Scotland
- Sovereign state: United Kingdom
- Post town: MUSSELBURGH
- Postcode district: EH21
- Dialling code: 0131
- Police: Scotland
- Fire: Scottish
- Ambulance: Scottish
- UK Parliament: East Lothian
- Scottish Parliament: Midlothian North and Musselburgh

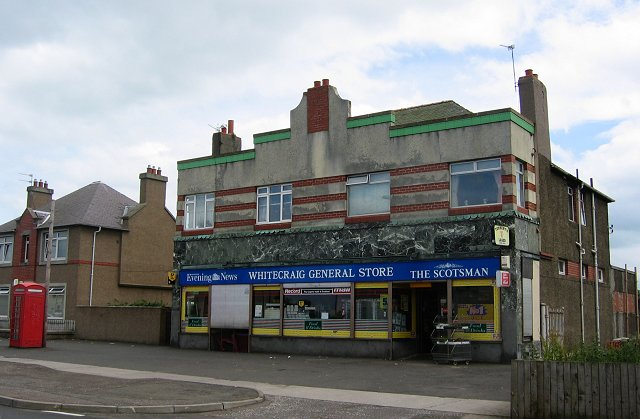
Shop in Whitecraig

Whitecraig is a village in East Lothian, Scotland. It lies between Musselburgh and Dalkeith, to the east of the city of Edinburgh. In 2022 it had a population of 1330.
