= Palace of Haddington =

Coordinates: 55°57′18″N 2°46′51″W

The Palace of Haddington was a 12th–13th-century royal palace in Haddington, East Lothian, Scotland. The palace stood in King Street (now Court Street), on the site of the present East Lothian Council buildings. Remains of the vaulting of the palace were found in 1833, during excavations.

Ada de Warenne obtained Haddington as part of her marriage settlement with Prince Henry of Scotland. Upon the death of her husband in 1152, Ada lived at the palace until her death in 1178. King William the Lion of Scotland used the palace from time to time and it was the birthplace of Alexander II in 1198. The palace and town were burned and pillaged in 1216, by an English army under the command of King John of England. The Scottish royal family appear to have abandoned the palace due to the damage caused.
