= Haddington Town House =

Municipal building in Haddington, Scotland

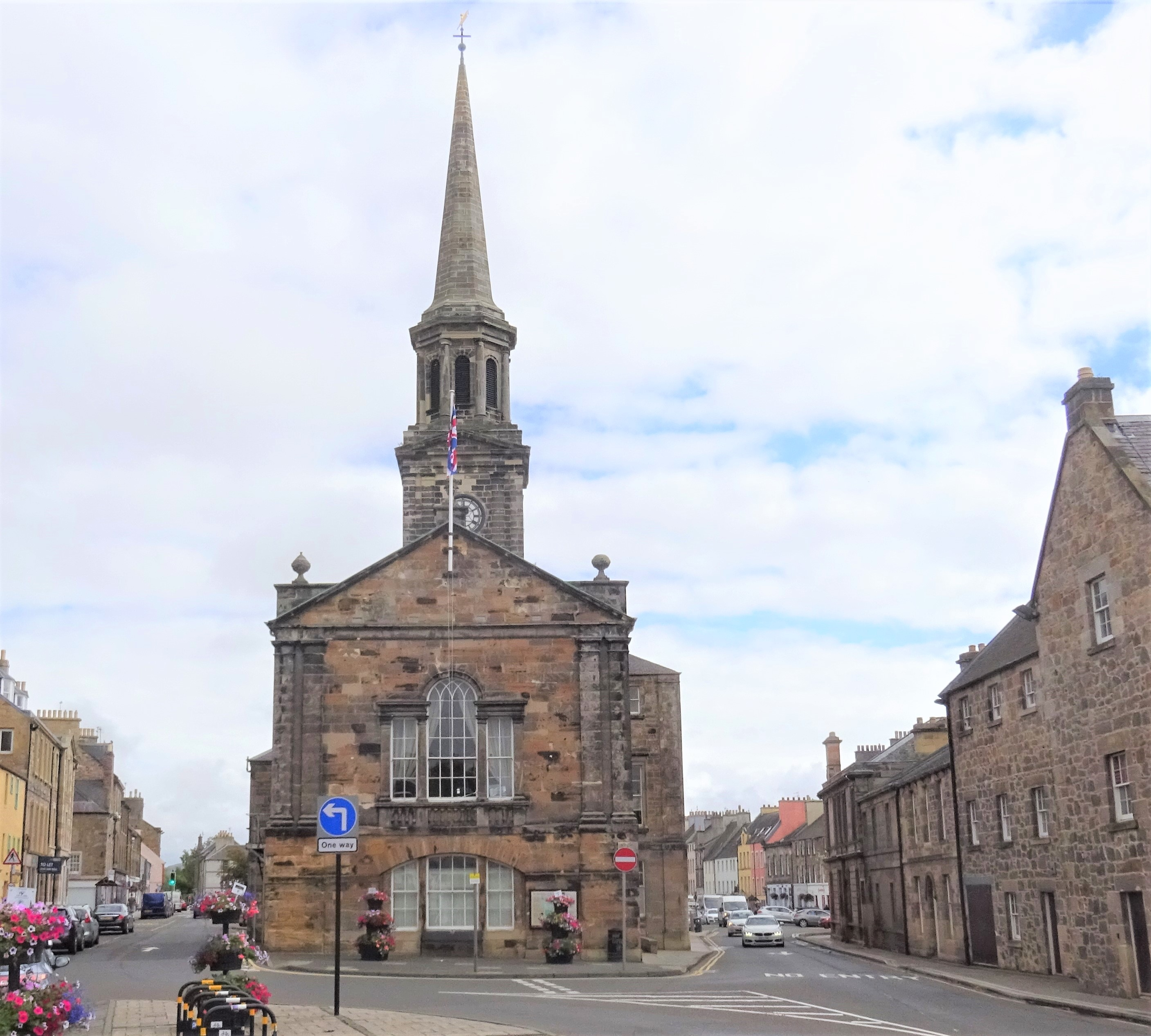
- Haddington Town House

- Shown in East Lothian
- 55.9556°N 2.7787°W
- Location: Court Street, Haddington

History
- Built: 1745

Site notes
- Architect: William Adam
- Architectural style: Scottish baronial style

Listed Building – Category A
- Official name: Town Hall
- Designated: 5 February 1971
- Reference no.: LB34185

Haddington Town House is a municipal structure in Court Street, Haddington, East Lothian, Scotland. The structure, which is the meeting place of East Lothian Council, is a Category A listed building.

== History ==
The first municipal building in the town was a medieval tolbooth which dated back to the early 15th century. It incorporated a drawbridge, a gaol for petty criminals and a spire. The bell in the tollbooth was rung at 7am and 10pm every day from the mid-16th century. By the 1730s, the building was in a dilapidated condition and meetings were transferred to the local library while the burgh leaders procured a new building.

Construction of the new building started in 1742. It was designed by William Adam in the Scottish baronial style, built in ashlar stone and was completed in 1745. The design involved a symmetrical main frontage facing west along Court Street; it was initially arcaded on the ground floor so that markets could be held, with an assembly room on the first floor. At the west end there were pilasters on the first floor supporting a pediment: after the markets had been abandoned, the ground floor was enclosed, a three-light segmental window was installed on the ground floor and, in 1788, a Venetian window was added on the first floor. At the east end, there was a clock tower with a belfry to which a spire, designed by James Gillespie Graham, was added in the 1831. Internally, the principal rooms were the cells for prisoners on the ground floor and the accommodation for the sheriff's court and the burgh council on the first floor.

In 1930, following the Local Government (Scotland) Act 1929, Haddington was reclassified as a small burgh, ceding many of its functions to East Lothian County Council, as the town was not considered large enough to run its own services efficiently. The town council of the burgh continued to use the town house as its meeting place. A plaque, presented by the commanding officer of the 10th Polish Mounted Rifles, part of Polish I Corps, to commemorate the hospitality of the people of Haddington during the unit's stay at Amisfield, was installed on the staircase in the town house in 1942, during the Second World War.

Following significant deterioration in the structure of the building, which led civic leaders to consider demolition as an option, the building was extensively refurbished to a design by Peter Whitson in the mid-1950s. Queen Elizabeth II, accompanied by the Duke of Edinburgh, visited the town hall to inspect the progress before undertaking a tour of the town on 7 July 1956. The building was officially re-opened by the Queen's aunt Princess Mary later in the year. It continued to serve as the headquarters of the town council for much of the 20th century, and remained the meeting place of the successor East Lothian District Council created in 1975 and then the current East Lothian Council created in 1996.

Works of art in the town house include a painting by the locally-born artist, William George Gillies, of a Midlothian landscape, a painting by William Darling McKay, who was born in Gifford, of cattle being driven on the salt marshes, and a painting by Patrick Adam, who was born in Edinburgh, of Gullane Links. There is also a painting by William Stewart MacGeorge, who was born in Castle Douglas, of a river with trees and a farm.

== See also ==
- List of Category A listed buildings in East Lothian
- List of listed buildings in Haddington, East Lothian
