= Fenton Barns, East Fenton and West Fenton =

Coordinates: 56°01′35″N 2°46′49″W

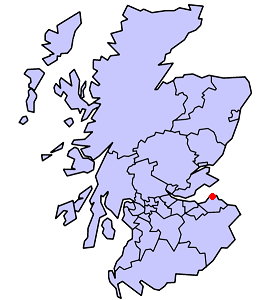

The hamlets of Fenton Barns, East Fenton and West Fenton make up a rural community in East Lothian, Scotland, approximately 20 miles (32 km) east of Edinburgh and close to the settlements of North Berwick, Drem, Dirleton and Gullane.

In addition to various long-established farms, a poultry processing factory, commercial mushroom-growing complex and traditional housing, Fenton Barns has more recently grown into a retail, leisure and industrial zone. Golf and archery are now on offer and the Fenton Barns farm shop presents local gourmet produce. Many local artisans have taken up studio space in the units at the former Drem Airfield.

East Fenton and West Fenton comprise farms and small hamlets of cottages. The main barn of the farm at East Fenton was destroyed in an arson attack in 2003.

== West Fenton ==
The hamlet of West Fenton lies approximately one mile south of Gullane. The small community is made up of a large farmhouse, adjoining converted steading, a number of semi-detached cottages (originally for farm workers), a modern farm buildings complex, and an expansive livery yard. The redevelopment retained the farm's tall chimney stack which vented the boiler fire for the steam-engine. This provided power for a grain thresher and other machinery. Also in the vicinity is a paintball course and dog agility training area.

The farm itself is made up of some 523 acres (2.12 km^{2}).

== Notable residents ==
- John Bertram
- George Hope Bertram
- John Preston, Lord Fentonbarns

== See also ==
- List of places in East Lothian
