= Mary White (trawler) =

British fishing trawler and boom defence vessel

History

United Kingdom
- Name: 1935: White Pioneer; 1937: Mary White; 1949: Luffness
- Namesake: 1949: Luffness
- Owner: 1935: White Trawlers Ltd; 1946: Shire Trawlers Ltd; 1949: Newhaven Trawlers Ltd
- Operator: 1940: (United Kingdom) Royal Navy; 1946: WA Bennett; 1949: W Carnie, Jr
- Port of registry: 1935: (United Kingdom) Newcastle, England; 1947: (United Kingdom) Grimsby, Scotland; 1949: (United Kingdom) Granton, Scotland
- Builder: John Lewis & Sons, Aberdeen
- Yard number: 134
- Launched: 1 August 1935
- Completed: September 1935
- Identification: UK official number 161586; call sign GYMT; 1940: pennant number Z 147; port letter and number: 1935: NE 3; 1947: GY 465; 1949: GN 57
- Fate: wrecked, 21 January 1958

General characteristics
- Type: fishing trawler
- Tonnage: 270 GRT, 118 NRT
- Length: 126.3 ft (38.5 m)
- Beam: 23.2 ft (7.1 m)
- Depth: 12.6 ft (3.8 m)
- Decks: 1
- Installed power: 1935: 1 × compound engine + single reduction gearing; 1 × exhaust steam turbine + double reduction gearing; 98 NHP; 470 bhp; 500 ihp; 1948: triple expansion engine; 86 NHP
- Propulsion: 1 × screw
- Sail plan: ketch
- Speed: as built: 13 1/2 knots (25 km/h)
- Crew: 1958: 12
- Sensors & processing systems: as built: echo sounding device; by 1957: position fixing device added; by 1958: radar added
- Notes: sister ships: Fort Rannoch; Mount Keen

Mary White was a steam trawler that was built in Aberdeen, Scotland, in 1935. She was launched as White Pioneer, but renamed Mary White in 1937. She was a naval trawler from 1940 to 1946. She was renamed Luffness in 1949.

She was the first steamship to be purpose-built with a propulsion system made by White's Marine Engineering Company of Newcastle. William Albert White combined a compound steam engine and an exhaust steam turbine, with reduction gearing for both engines onto the same propeller shaft. In 1948 her compound engine, turbine, and reduction gearing were all removed, and replaced with a triple expansion engine.

As White Pioneer, the trawler operated from Newcastle upon Tyne. As Mary White, she operated from Milford Haven and Grimsby. As Luffness, she operated from Granton. In 1958 Luffness ran aground while trying to enter Aberdeen Harbour, but without loss of life. She was repaired and refloated to be towed away for scrap, but sank a few miles southeast of Aberdeen.

== White Pioneer ==
In 1934, White had bought a second-hand turbine ship, and converted her to his combination of reciprocating and turbine propulsion with reduction gearing. The ship, which he renamed Adderstone, was a successful proof of concept. He then ordered a new fishing trawler from John Lewis & Sons of Aberdeen, to be equipped with a smaller version of the same propulsion system.

Lewis built her as yard number 134; launched her on 1 August 1935; and completed her that September. Her length was 126.3 ft (38.5 m); her beam was 23.2 ft (7.1 m); and her depth was 12.6 ft (3.8 m). Her tonnages were 270 GRT and 118 NRT. She was designed to fish in either the North Sea, or waters around the Faroe Islands.

White Pioneer had a single screw. Her compound engine had two cylinders, and drove the propeller shaft via single reduction gearing. Her exhaust turbine drove the same shaft via double reduction gearing. A single Scotch boiler, made by Riley Brothers of Stockton-on-Tees, supplied steam at 220 lbf/in^{2}. The combined power of her reciprocating engine plus turbine was rated at 98 NHP; 470 bhp; or 500 ihp. She achieved 13 1/2 knots (25 km/h) on her sea trials. She was rigged to sail as a ketch. She was equipped with an echo sounding device.

White Pioneer was registered at Newcastle. Her UK official number was 161586; her call sign was GYMT; and her port letter and number were NE 3. White owned White Pioneer, but Joseph D Irwin of North Shields managed her.

John Lewis & Sons built trawlers for other customers to the same measurements as White Pioneer. Yard number 136 was launched in December 1935 as Fort Rannoch, and yard number 137 was launched in June 1936 as Mount Keen. However, each had a traditional triple expansion engine, with no exhaust turbine, and without White's reduction gearing.

== Mary White ==
By mid-1937, White Pioneer had been renamed Mary White. On 20 May that year, she attended the fleet review at Spithead in England, that celebrated the Coronation of George VI and Elizabeth. From 11 June, she was based at Milford Haven in Wales, and by 1 July, her managers were Peter Hancock & Sons of Milford. She was laid up from 7 October 1938 to 18 January 1939.

In January 1940, the Admiralty requisitioned Mary White. She was converted into a boom defence vessel. Her pennant number was Z 147. By January 1942 she was based at Oban, under the Western Approaches Command. In February 1946 she was returned to her owners.

On 11 March 1944, while she was still in naval service, Shire Trawlers became her owners, and William Alfred Bennett became her manager. On 11 March 1947, her registration was transferred to Grimsby. Her port letter and number were GY 465. In January 1948, Alexander Hall and Sons replaced Mary White's engine and boiler. Her White's engines and gearing were dispensed with, and Hall installed in their stead a three-cylinder triple-expansion engine that they had built in 1926. Her replacement boiler was made by Riley Brothers, who had made her original boiler, but its operating pressure was 190 lbf/in^{2}, which was lower than that of her original boiler.

== Luffness ==
On 3 December 1948, Newhaven Trawlers became Mary White's owners, and William Carnie, Junior, became her manager. She was renamed Luffness, after the hamlet of Luffness in East Lothian. Her registration was transferred to Granton on the Firth of Forth, and her port letter and number were GN 57. Her navigation equipment included a position fixing device by 1957, and radar by 1958.

On 21 January 1958, Luffness tried to enter Aberdeen Harbour to land a crewman who had been taken ill. As sh approached the harbour mouth, her steering gear malfunctioned, and she grounded on the North Pier. The Aberdeen Steam Tug Company's tug Danny soon reached the trawler, and cast a line to her, but Luffness was rolled so much in the swell that the line was broken. This happened three times. Then the Aberdeen pilot cutter arrived, got alongside Luffness, and rescued 11 members of the crew. As the cutter pulled away, it was realised that one crewman had been left on the trawler. Danny quickly rescued him. The crewman who was ill was hospitalised, and the others were taken to Aberdeen Seamen's Mission.

Luffness was in danger of rolling off the North Pier into the navigable channel, where she would become a navigation hazard, so lines were secured to her to try to hold her in place. The next day she rolled onto her side, but remained on the rocky ledge, and so did not obstruct the channel. Attempts were made to salve her, but stopped several times by bad weather. By 15 March, her insurers had declared her a constructive total loss. She was passed to Metal Industries, Limited to be scrapped. She was temporarily repaired, in order to be towed to Metal Industries' ship breaking yard on the Firth of Forth.

Luffness was towed out of Aberdeen, but sank a few miles out of port. Sources disagree as to whether she was scuttled, or whether she sank against the wishes of Metal Industries. A hydrographic survey has found a wreck at position 57°05′34″N 02°01′48″W, at a depth of almost 150 feet (46 m). No dive reports have established the identity of the wreck, but her size and position suggest that it is that of Luffness.

== Bibliography ==
- Lloyd's Register of Shipping (PDF). Vol. I.–Steamers and Motorships under 300 tons. London: Lloyd's Register of Shipping. 1936 – via Southampton City Council.
- Lloyd's Register of Shipping (PDF). Vol. I.–Steamers and Motorships under 300 tons. London: Lloyd's Register of Shipping. 1937 – via Southampton City Council.
- Lloyd's Register of Shipping (PDF). Vol. I.–Steamers and Motorships of 300 tons. London: Lloyd's Register of Shipping. 1944 – via Southampton City Council.
- Lloyd's Register of Shipping. Vol. II.–Steamers, Motorships, Sailing Vessels, &c. London: Lloyd's Register of Shipping. 1948 – via Internet Archive.
- Mercantile Navy List. London: Registrar General of Shipping and Seamen. 1936 – via Crew List Index Project.
- Register Book. Vol. I Register of Ships. London: Lloyd's Register of Shipping. 1957 – via Internet Archive.
- Register Book. Vol. I Register of Ships. London: Lloyd's Register of Shipping. 1958 – via Internet Archive.
