= Aberlady Bay =

Bay in East Lothian, Scotland

Coordinates: 56.018°N 2.873°W

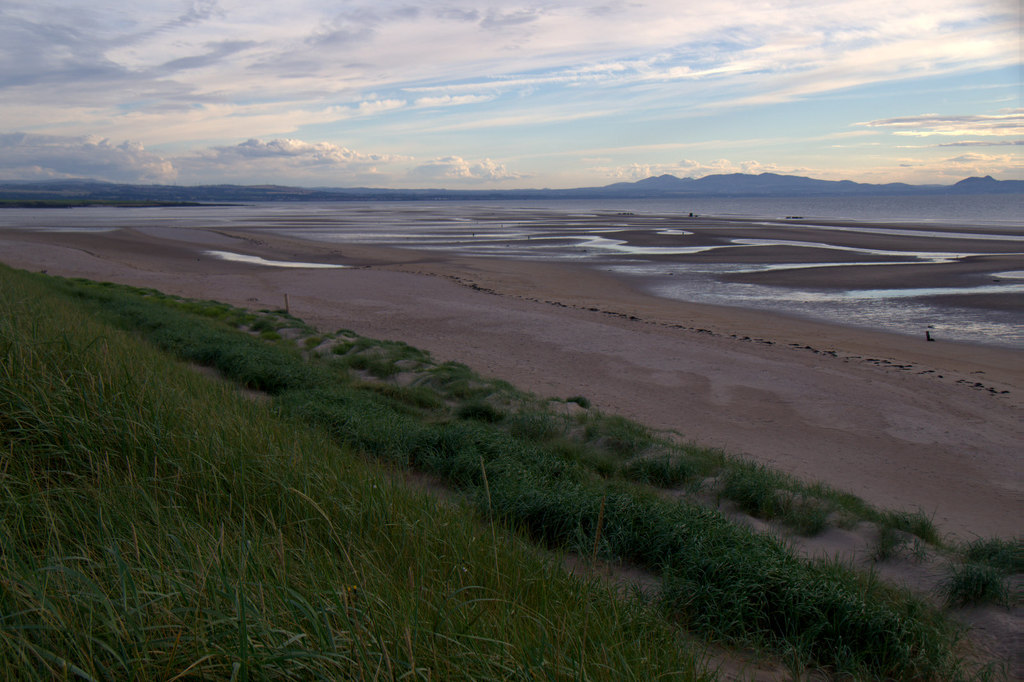
Aberlady Bay coastline

Aberlady Bay in East Lothian, Scotland lies between Aberlady and Gullane.

In 1952, Aberlady Bay became the UK's first Local Nature Reserve (LNR) and is served by the East Lothian Council Rangers.

The Scottish Ornithologists' Club has Waterston House as its headquarters at Aberlady, with panoramic views of the bay.

Aberlady Bay is part of the John Muir Way, a long distance footpath from Fisherrow (Musselburgh) to Dunglass. It is also the East Lothian Section of the transnational North Sea Trail, a path network connecting seven countries and 26 areas.

== Wrecks ==
Designations

Scheduled monument
- Official name: Kilspindie, wrecks of eight fishing boats
- Type: Secular: shipwreck
- Designated: 11 December 2002
- Reference no.: SM10471

The wrecks of eight historic (19th or early 20th century) fishing vessels at Kilspindie have been designated as maritime scheduled monuments.

Two wrecks of XT-craft, training versions of the X craft, can be seen. In 1946, the craft were towed to the bay, then moored to a concrete block and used for target practice by aircraft of the Royal Air Force. The wrecks of the submarines lie much closer to the low-water mark than the high-water mark, and tides in the bay rise very quickly.

== See also ==
- John Muir Way
- Protection of Wrecks Act
- List of places in East Lothian
- List of bays of the British Isles
