= Aberlady =

Coastal village in Scotland

Coordinates: 56.01°N 2.86°W

Aberlady: Scottish Gaelic: Obar Lobhaite; Scots: Aiberlady
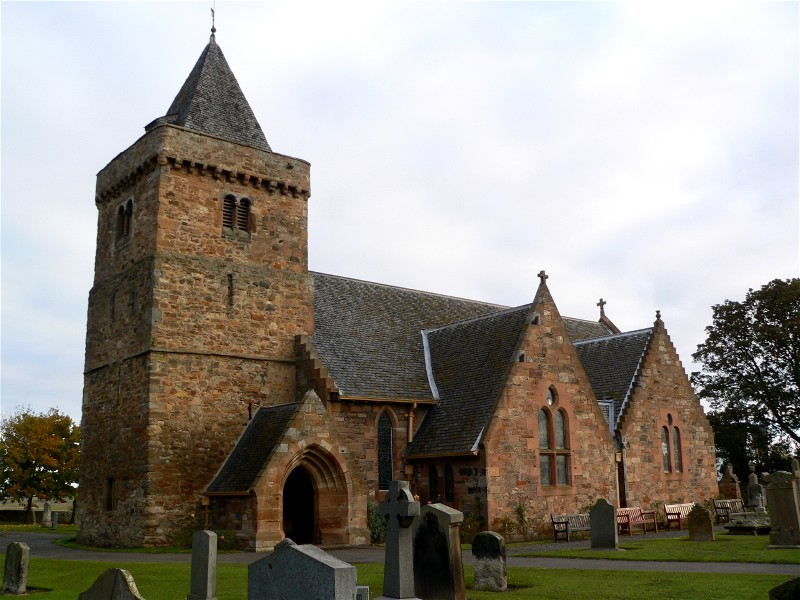
- Aberlady Church

- Location within East Lothian
- Population: 1,260 (2020)
- OS grid reference: NT465798
- Council area: East Lothian
- Lieutenancy area: East Lothian
- Country: Scotland
- Sovereign state: United Kingdom
- Post town: LONGNIDDRY
- Postcode district: EH32 xxx
- Dialling code: 01875
- Police: Scotland
- Fire: Scottish
- Ambulance: Scottish
- UK Parliament: East Lothian
- Scottish Parliament: East Lothian

Aberlady (Scots: Aiberlady, Gaelic: Obar Lobhaite) is a coastal village in the Scottish council area of East Lothian. The village had an estimated population of 1,260 in 2020.

== Etymology ==
The name Aberlady has Brittonic origins. The first part of the name is the common naming element aber, meaning "confluence, estuary". The second part is a river name, an earlier name for the West Peffer Burn, derived from either *lẹ:β, which in river names may mean "glide smoothly", or *loβ, a verbal root associated with "peeling away, decomposition, decay" (Middle Irish lobour, "leprosy").

== History ==
There is archaeological evidence of a significant and wealthy Anglo-Saxon settlement dating from the 7th to the 10th centuries.

In the Middle Ages, Aberlady was an important harbour for fishing, sealing, and whaling and was designated "Port of Haddington" by a 1633 Act of Parliament. However, its origins are much earlier.

Aberlady had links with the monasteries at Iona and Lindisfarne from the 7th century, and its role was to facilitate the pilgrim traffic between the two sites. Previous archaeological excavations have shown traces of a Culdee chapel, and Pope Gregory X made reference to the church which he called "Aberlefdi". The 8th century Aberlady Cross fragment can be seen at the National Museum of Scotland in Edinburgh. A reconstruction of this finely carved cross was erected in 2011 by Aberlady Conservation & History Society.

Aberlady Parish Church dates back to the 15th century. It was re-built in 1887. In 1986, the parishes of Aberlady and Gullane were merged, and the manse is now in Gullane.

The "Aberlady Heritage Project" is a community-led project, and in 2008 it surveyed three sites — the medieval harbour quay commissioned in 1535, the Iron Age fort and associated souterrain at Kilspindie, and the Anglo-Saxon site at the Glebe. Aberlady has the largest collection of stray Anglo-Saxon finds yet discovered in Scotland.

== Conservation ==
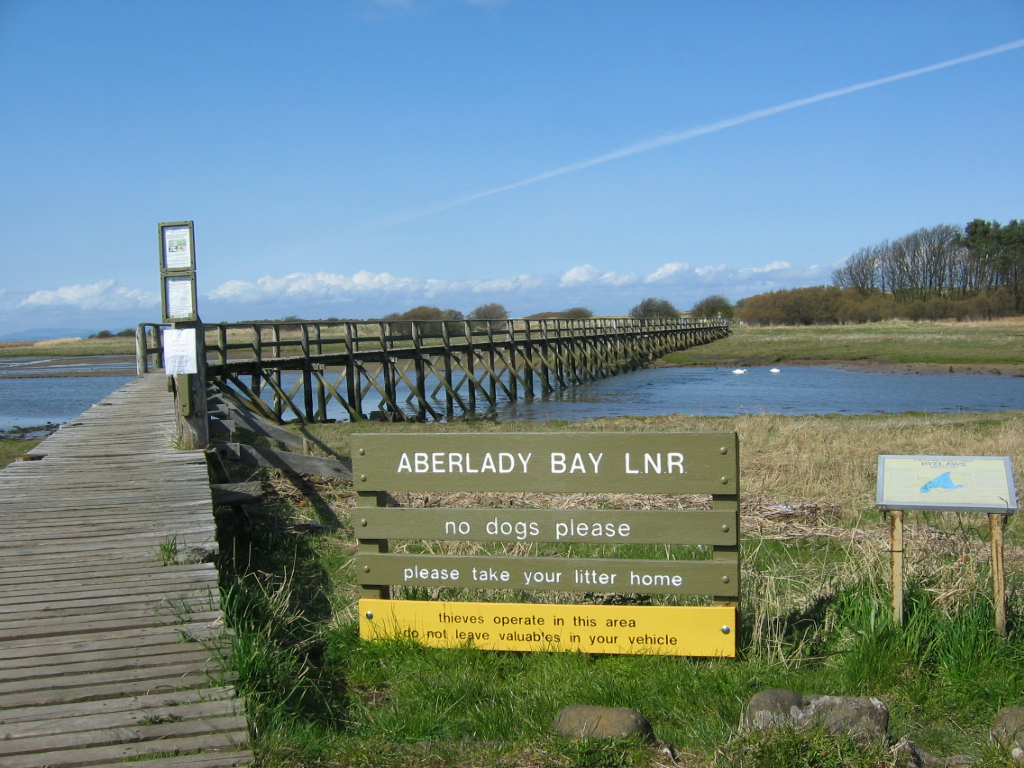
Aberlady Nature Reserve Footbridge that crosses the Peffer Burn. Footbridge to Luffness

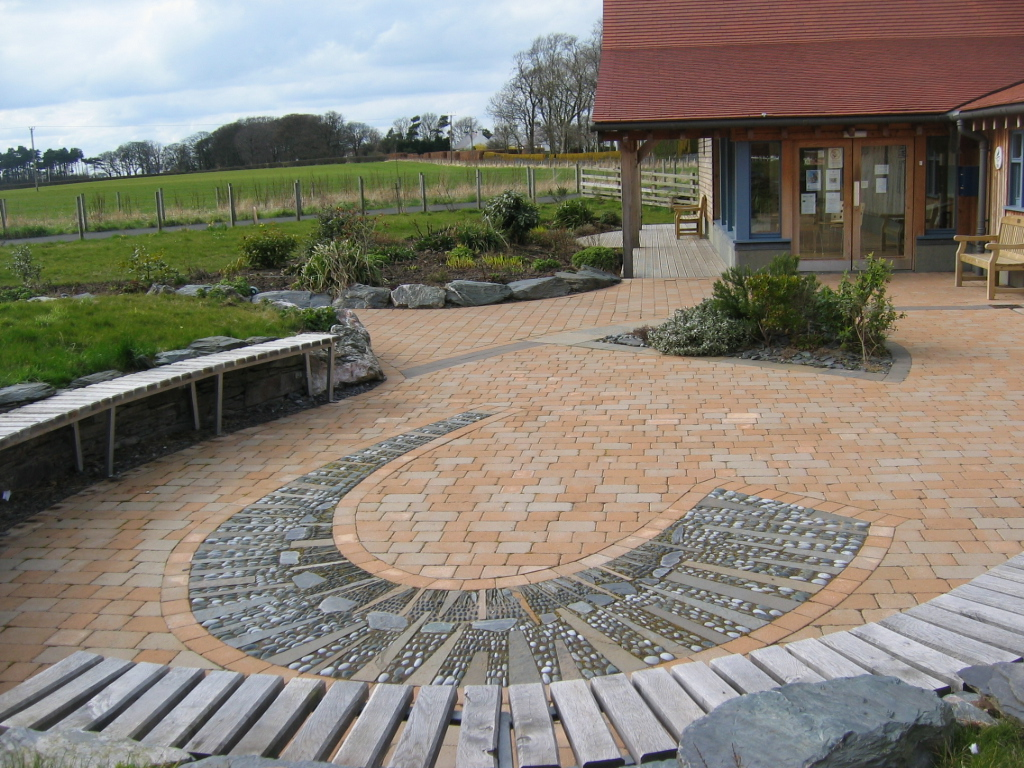
Birdwatching Centre

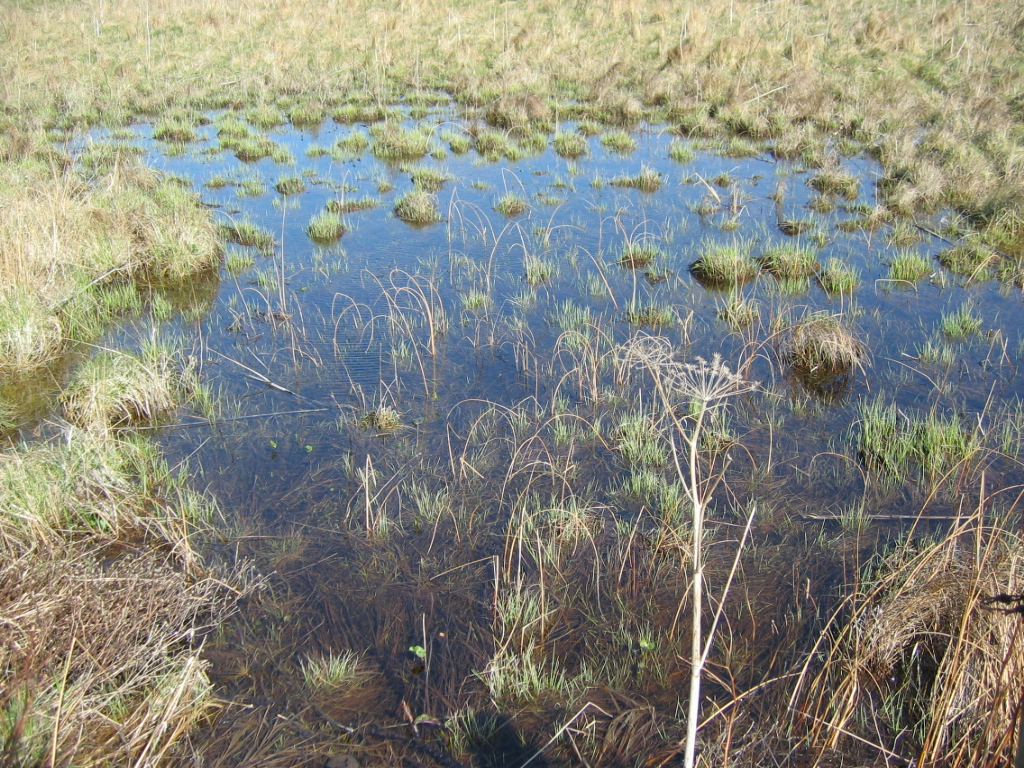
Aberlady wetlands

In 1952, Aberlady Bay became the UK's first Local Nature Reserve or LNR. Amongst its other conservation designations are: Site of Special Scientific Interest or SSSI; Special Protection Area or SPA; and Ramsar site. East Lothian Council provides Reserve Wardens.

Waterston House, overlooking Aberlady Bay, is the headquarters of the Scottish Ornithologists' Club (SOC). It is named after George Waterston, joint founder of the SOC, and Director of the Royal Society for the Protection of Birds in Scotland.

The Library holds more than 3,500 items and is said to be the largest ornithological library in Scotland.

The art gallery space is named after wildlife artist Donald Watson, who was President of SOC. The gallery specialises in bird-related paintings, but in May 2008 it had a textile exhibition named "Flights of Fancy".

The author Nigel Tranter was inspired to write on his daily walks on the nature reserve. A cairn in his memory stands at the car park by the wooden footbridge; Nigel Tranter referred to it as "the bridge to enchantment".

Aberlady Conservation & History Society is the local focus for conservation in the built and natural environment of the village and its surroundings.

== Nearby places of interest ==
Aberlady is close to several well-known golf courses, including Luffness, Kilspindie and Craigielaw.

Aberlady Bay, between Aberlady and Gullane, holds the wrecks of eight 19th- or early 20th-century fishing vessels, which have been designated as maritime scheduled ancient monuments, and two wrecks of XT-craft, training versions of the X-class submarine.

== See also ==
- List of places in East Lothian
- List of wildlife artists
- North Sea Trail
- John Muir Way
- Myreton Motor Museum
- Aberlady Bay
- List of town walls in Scotland
