= Blindwells =

Town in East Lothian, Scotland

Coordinates: 55.957°N 2.936°W

- Council area: East Lothian Council
- Lieutenancy area: East Lothian
- Country: Scotland
- Sovereign state: United Kingdom
- Police: Scotland
- Fire: Scottish
- Ambulance: Scottish
- UK Parliament: Lothian East
- Scottish Parliament: East Lothian

Blindwells is a new town under construction in East Lothian, Scotland.

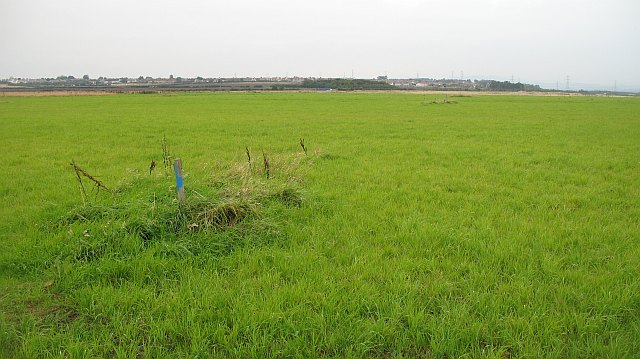
The potential site for a new town in East Lothian

The town is on the site of a former open-cast coal mine north of Tranent on the north-east side of the A1, just east of the Prestonpans/Tranent junction, adjacent to the estates of the Earl of Wemyss and March. As of plans in 2010, it was intended that the Blindwells settlement will initially consist of around 1,600 houses, and is part of East Lothian's planned 4,800 house total.

== Proposed settlement ==
The settlement was to include its own community centre, pre-school facility, primary and secondary schools and commercial aspects. Though the planned 1,600 houses implies a smaller development than the Scottish New Towns created in the sixties, this could be expanded to accommodate another 2,500 to 3,000 houses in the future, for which a total of 130 hectares were earmarked.

Older maps also show a cluster of buildings at Riggonhead, on the bank to the south-east of the main pond, at NT416752, but all that remained were earth mounds which were frequently used by scrambler bikes.

In preparation for the new town development a series of man-made earth embankments were constructed in 2009 for the purpose of settlement tests, i.e. to demonstrate that the site is stable enough to be built on.

By October 2023 150 houses were completed and occupied, with 5 housing companies active, or about to commence building, on the site and plans for a new town centre had been submitted for approval. Work on the new primary school started in 2024 and it is due for completion in the Spring of 2025.

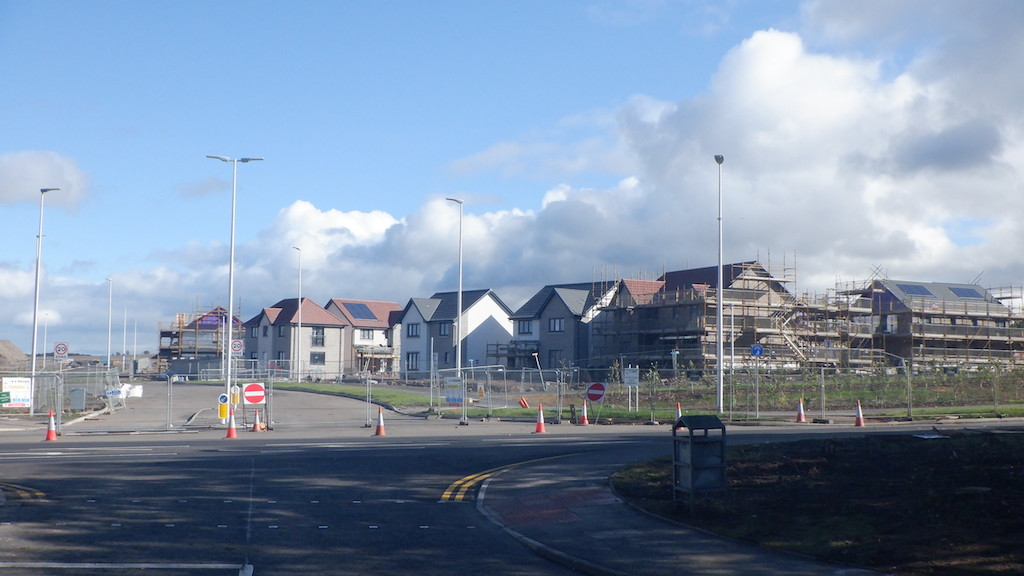
New houses at Blindwells

== Wildlife ==
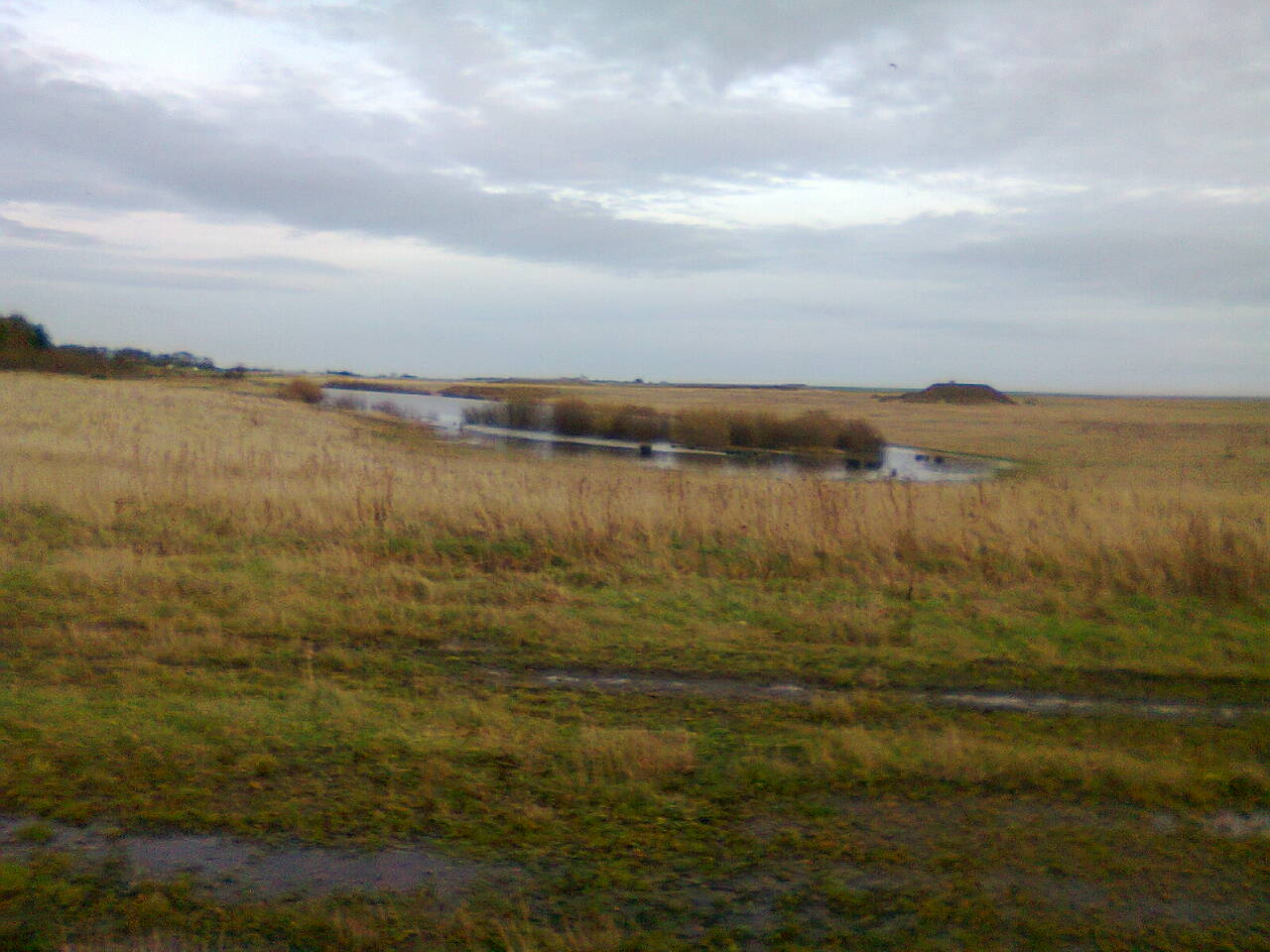
Blindwells pool on a winter afternoon, 2011

There has long been a pool on the northern part of the site and this had attracted a good range of bird species as it was one of the few standing open waters in East Lothian. Waterbirds regularly seen here included mute swan*, mallard*, common teal, wigeon, tufted duck, little grebe*, moorhen* and coot* (* confirmed breeding since 2008). Gadwall also bred in 2012 with two broods seen in 2014 and a further expansion since. Regular counts are undertaken for BTO Wetland Bird Survey (WeBS) monitoring. Other characteristic birds of the site include grey partridge*, common kestrel, common buzzard, stock dove, skylark*, common grasshopper warbler, sedge warbler*, tree sparrow, reed bunting* and yellowhammer*, with altogether 29 species confirmed to breed in the period 2008-2013, with 17 "probable" breeders and a further 9 "possible" breeders (using BTO Atlas classifications). Scarcer species recorded include little egret, common shelduck, garganey, northern shoveler, greater scaup, smew (drake plus 3 redheads, Feb 2012), marsh harrier (occasional extended presence), hen harrier (18 November 2014), merlin, common quail, a total of 18 species of wading bird including little ringed plover, wood sandpiper, green sandpiper, spotted redshank, black-tailed godwit and bar-tailed godwit, also short-eared owl, barn owl, common cuckoo, common kingfisher, lesser whitethroat, garden warbler and water pipit (15 March 2015); long-eared owls bred on the perimeter of the site in 2017.

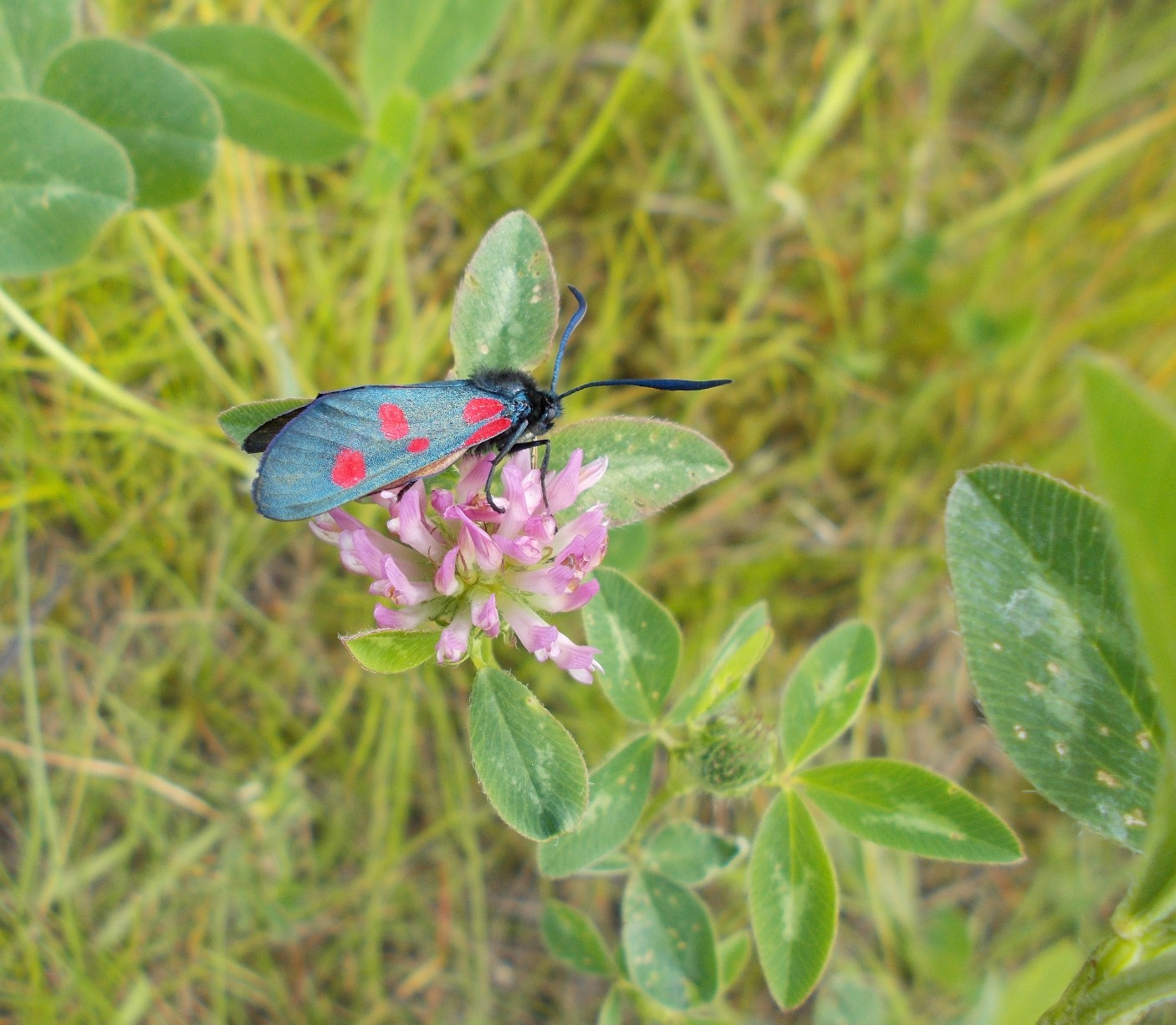
Narrow-bordered Five-spot Burnet Zygaena lonicerae, Blindwells, 18 July 2015

There was rich insect fauna too with nine species of dragonfly and damselfly having been recorded including the rare Red-veined Darter (Sympetrum fonscolombii) (2nd record for Lothian) and Black Darter (Sympetrum danae), together with common breeding species Emerald Damselfly (Lestes sponsa), Azure Damselfly (Coenagrion puella), Common Blue Damselfly (Enallagma cyathigerum), Blue-tailed Damselfly (Ischnura elegans), and scarcer breeders Common Hawker (Aeshna juncea), Four-spotted Chaser(Libellula quadrimaculata) and Common Darter (Sympetrum striolatum). There was a colony of grayling and also narrow-bordered five-spot burnet moth, which is currently on the edge of its UK range in this part of Scotland (photo, right). The pond supported abundant amphibians, including smooth newt, attracting Grey Herons.

== Minewater treatment scheme ==
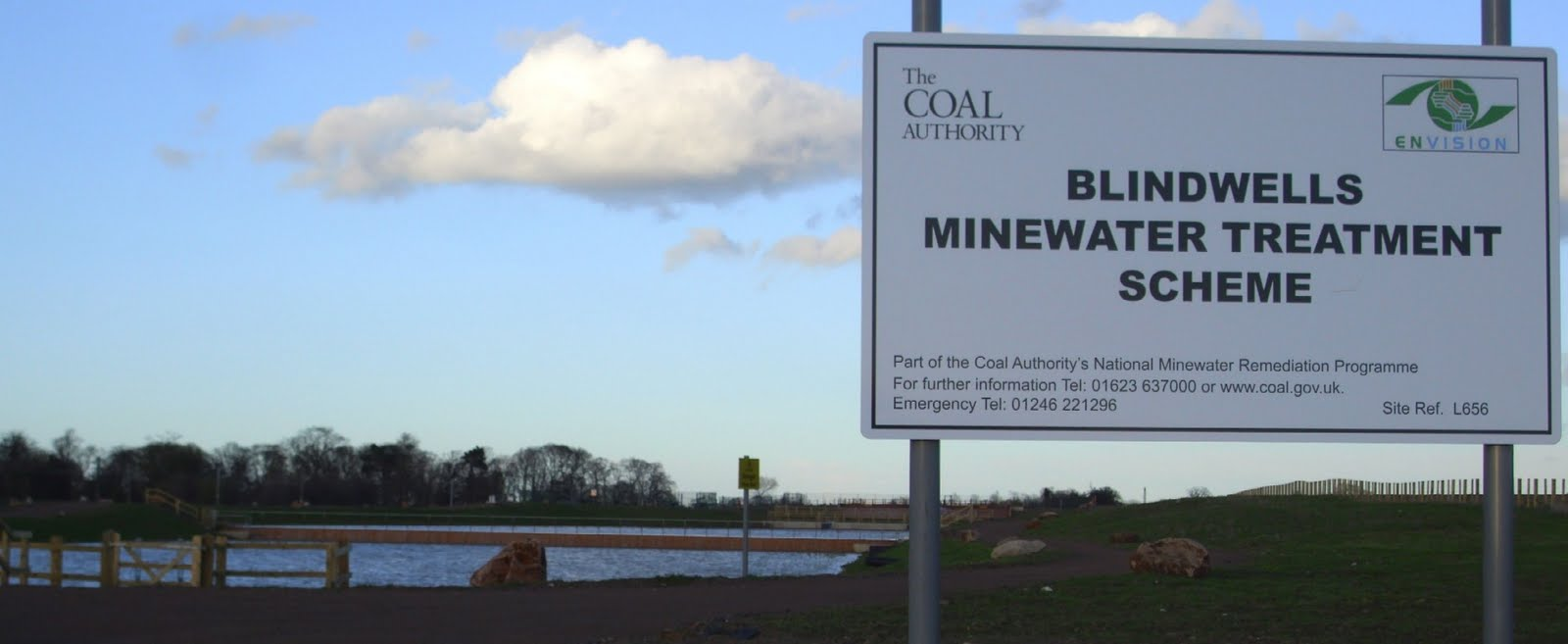
The Minewater Treatment Scheme at Blindwells, soon after it was first established (3/4/11)

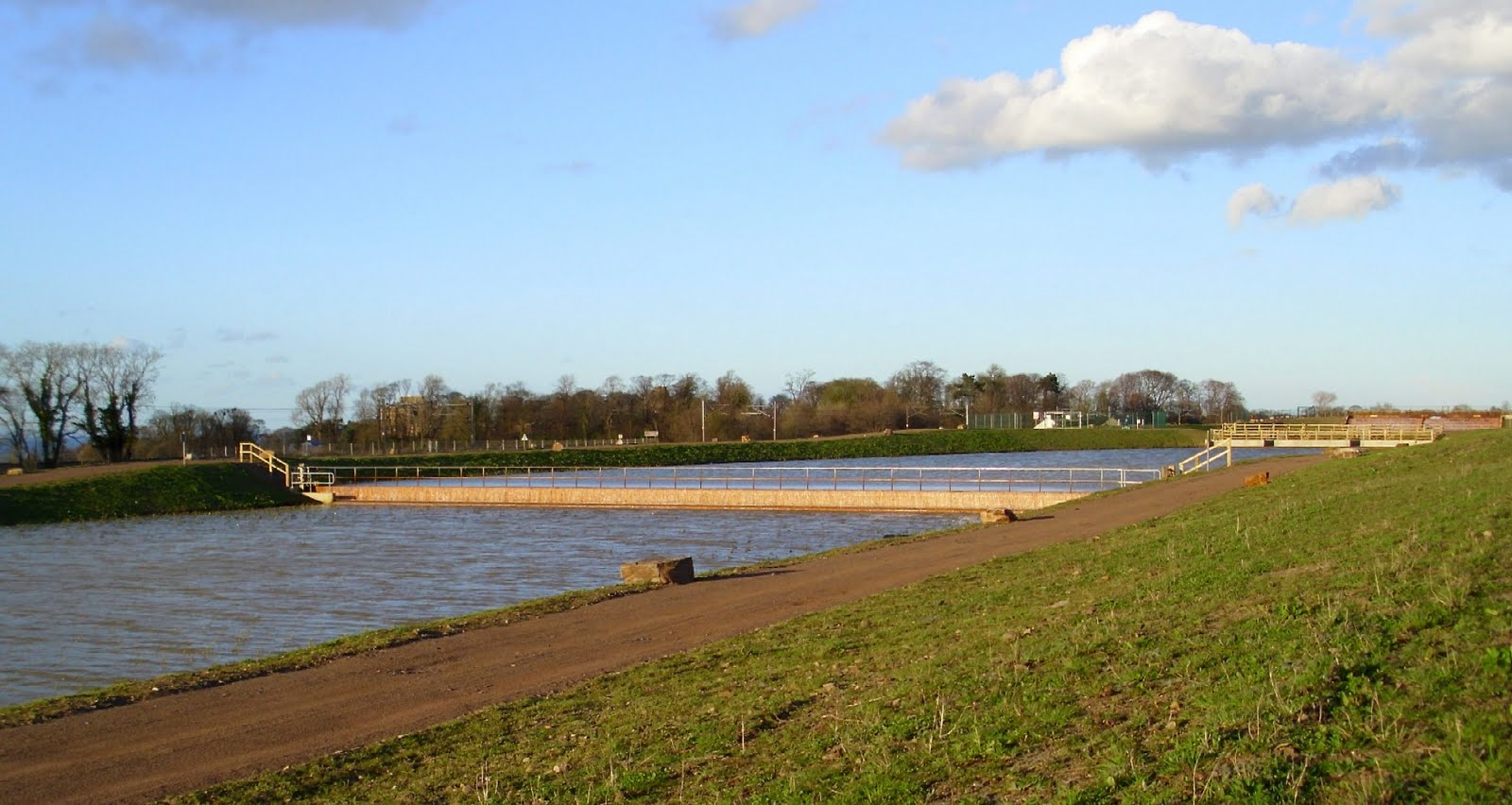
Blindwells MTS, view to NE (photo dated 3 April 2011)

A reed bed treatment scheme for minewater, covering an area of 2.5 ha, has been constructed to the east of the natural pond at Blindwells. It consists of a 30 m long precast concrete cascade, 1.2 m deep conditioning zone and 3 N° reed beds with associated inlet and outlet structures. The reed bed levels have been designed to give a gravity flow through the system and also a piped bypass system. The photos here were taken in April 2009 when the reedbeds had only just begun to develop; by summer 2012 there was no sign of open water as dense vegetation was covering each of the pools. Reed harvest commenced spring 2015.

== See also ==
- List of places in East Lothian
- List of places in Scotland
