= Broxburn, East Lothian =

Coordinates: 55.988°N 2.493°W

Broxburn: Scottish Gaelic: Allt Bhroc
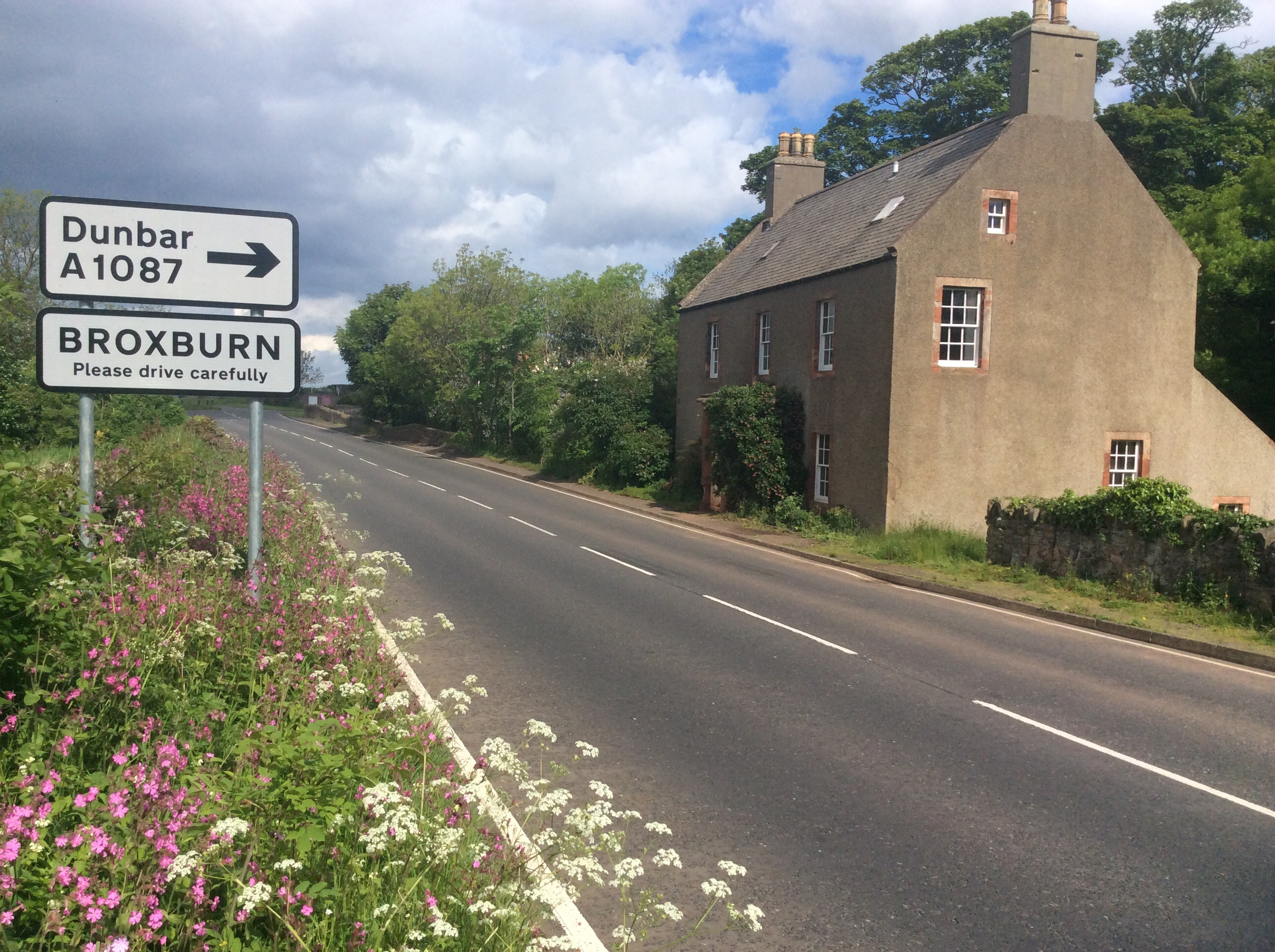
- Entering Broxburn on the A1087 road

- Location within Scotland
- OS grid reference: NT692772
- Civil parish: Dunbar
- Council area: East Lothian Council
- Lieutenancy area: East Lothian
- Country: Scotland
- Sovereign state: United Kingdom
- Post town: DUNBAR
- Postcode district: EH42
- Dialling code: 01368
- Police: Scotland
- Fire: Scottish
- Ambulance: Scottish
- UK Parliament: East Lothian
- Scottish Parliament: East Lothian

Broxburn is a hamlet consisting of a handful of scattered houses which serve the Broxmouth estate in East Lothian, Scotland. It is named after the stream upon which it stands, the Brox Burn. It lies about 1.5 miles (2.4 km) south-east of Dunbar. On the Brox Burn is Brand's Mill, dating from mediaeval times. The Battle of Dunbar, on 3 September 1650, took place on the foothills directly south, halfway between Brand's Mill and the hamlet of Little Pinkerton.

Not to be confused with the larger town of Broxburn, West Lothian.

== See also ==
- List of places in East Lothian
