= List of places in East Lothian =

The List of places in East Lothian is a list for any town, village and hamlet in the East Lothian council area of Scotland.

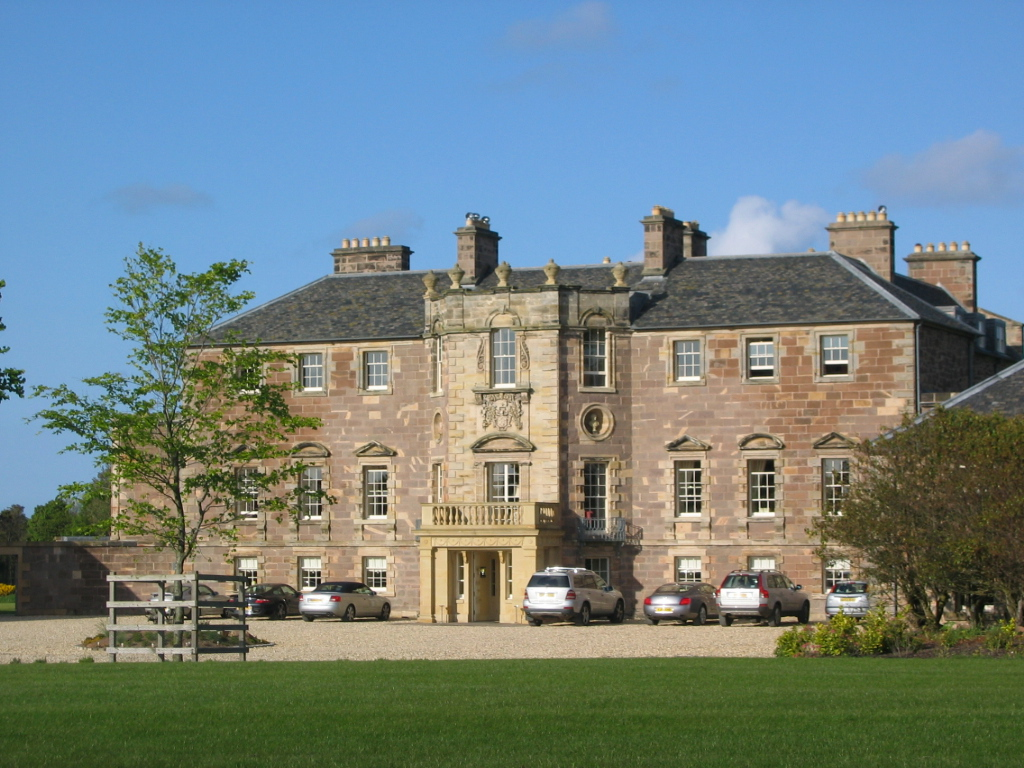
Archerfield House

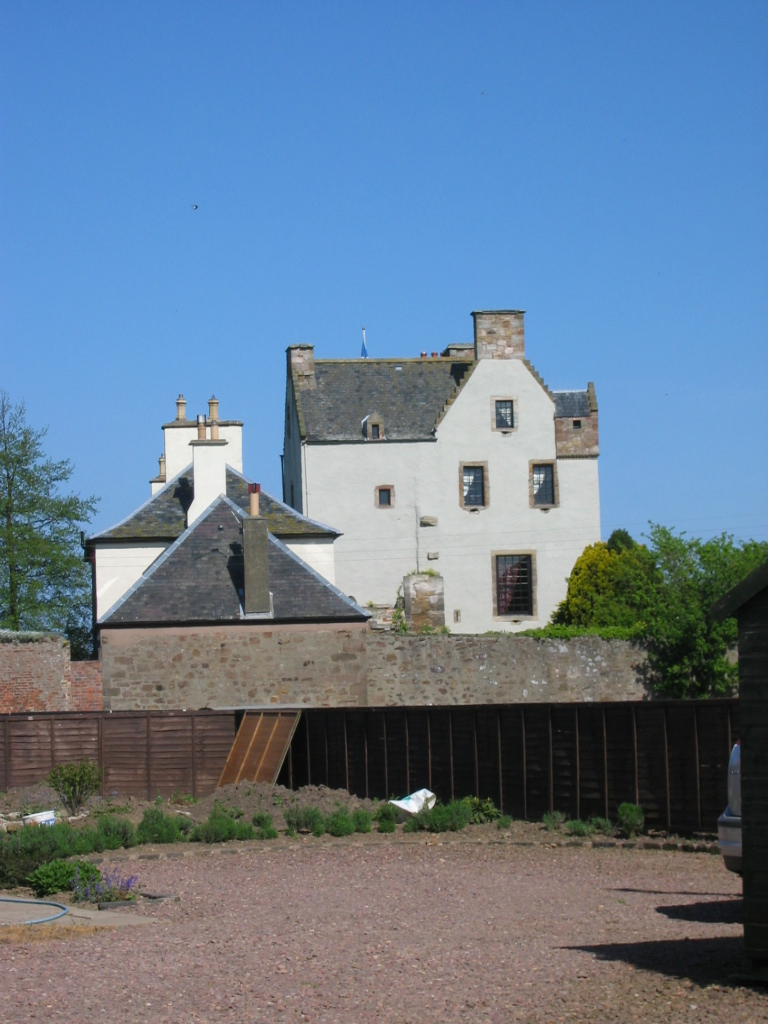
Ballencrieff Castle

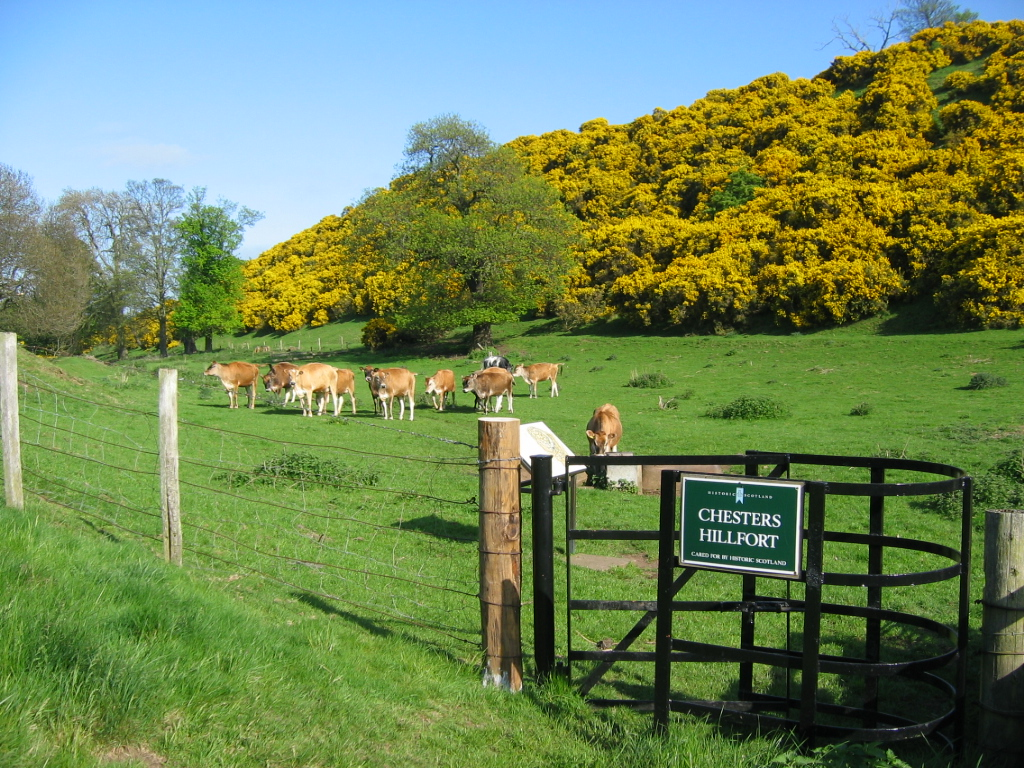
Chesters Hill Fort

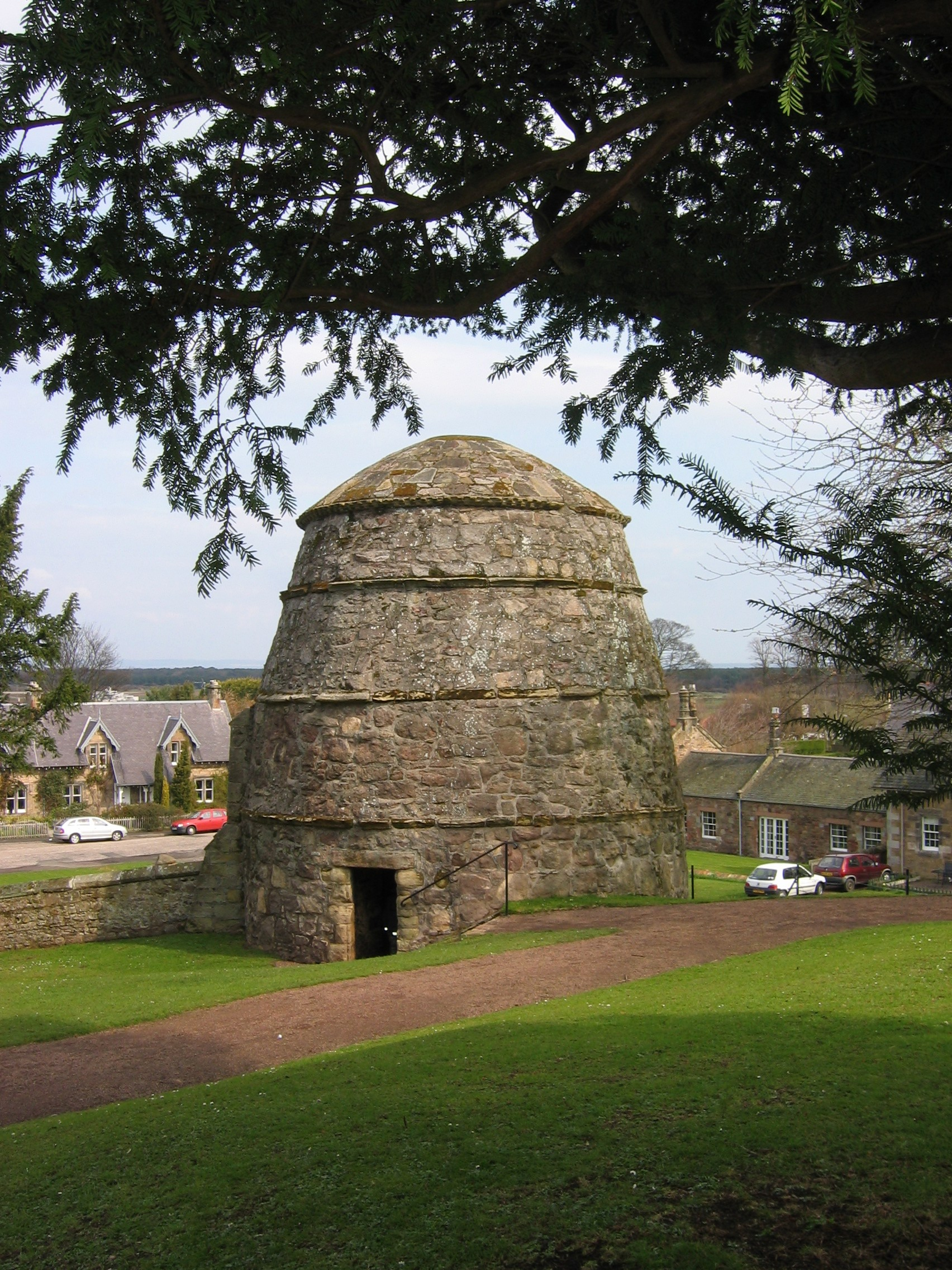
Dirleton Castle Doocot

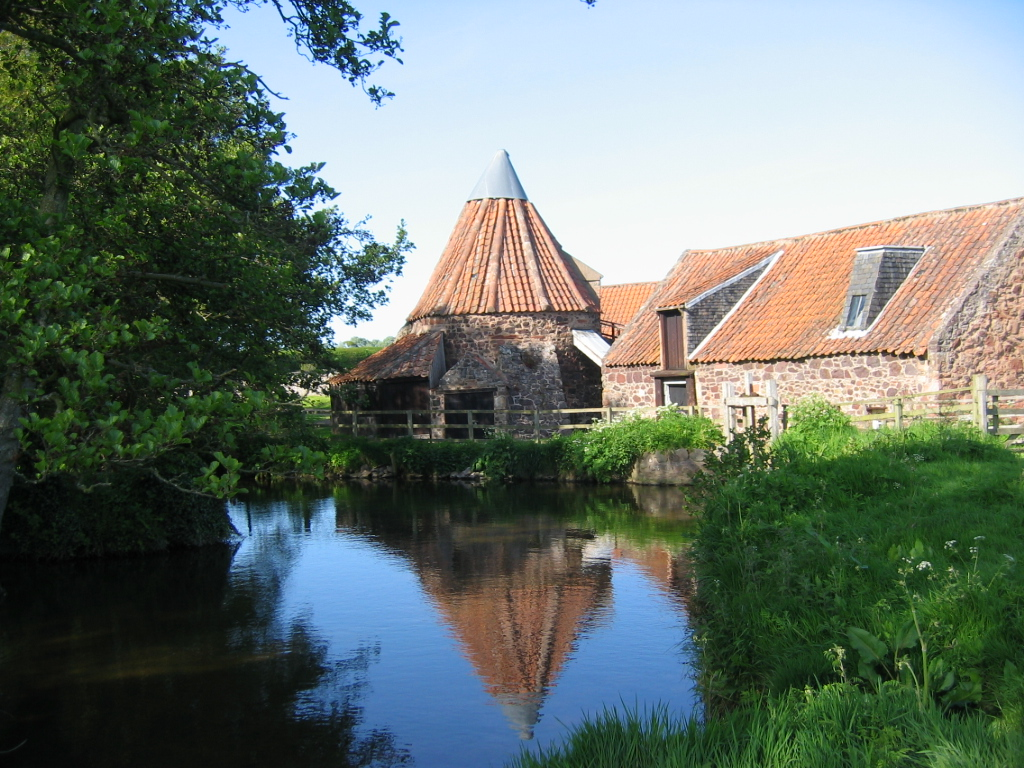
East Linton, Preston Mill

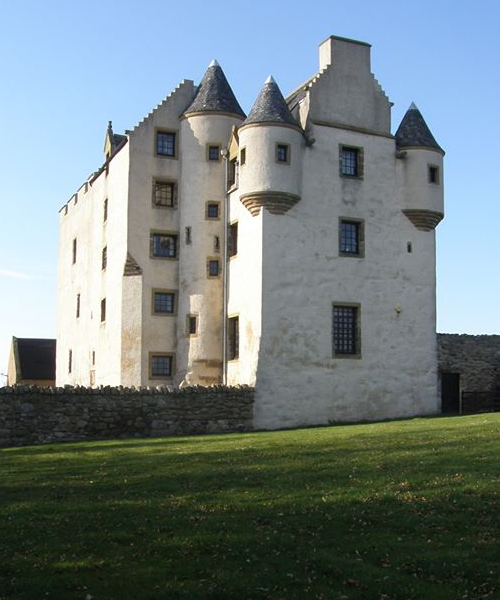
Fa'side Castle

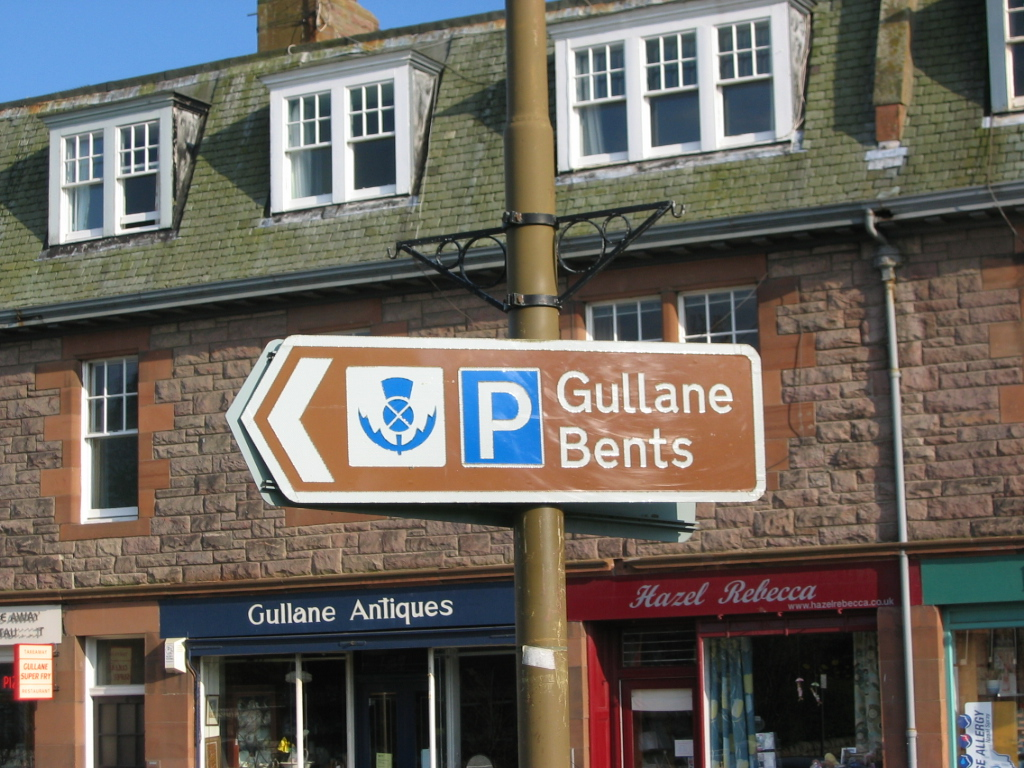
Gullane High Street

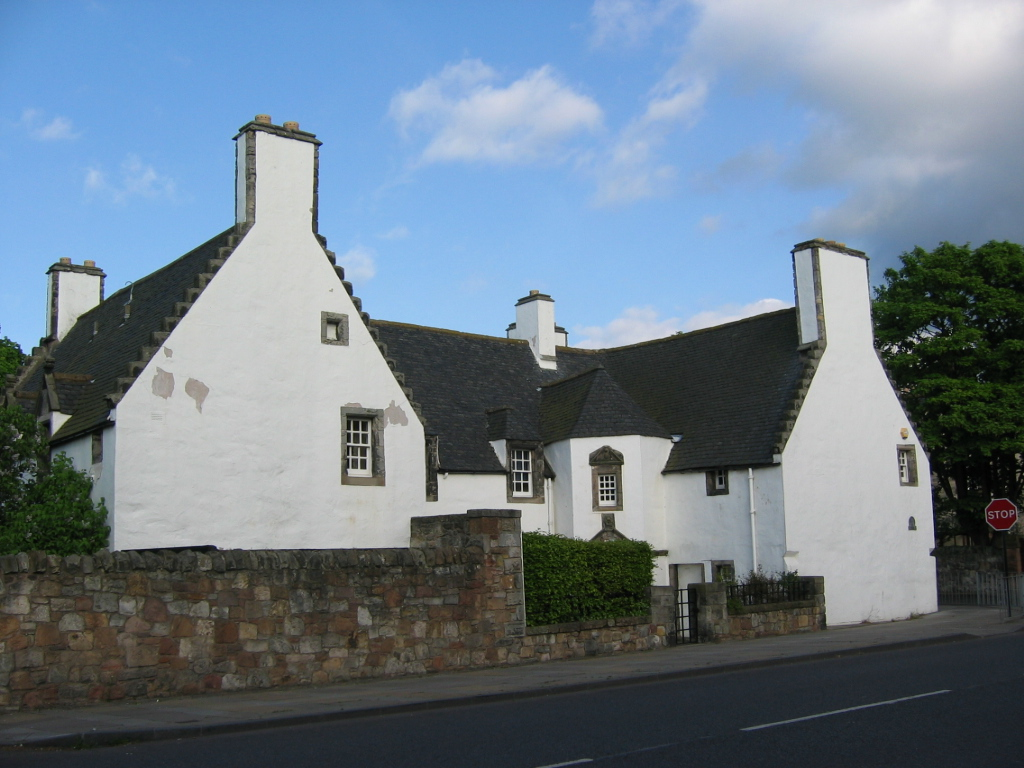
Hamilton House, Preston, Prestonpans

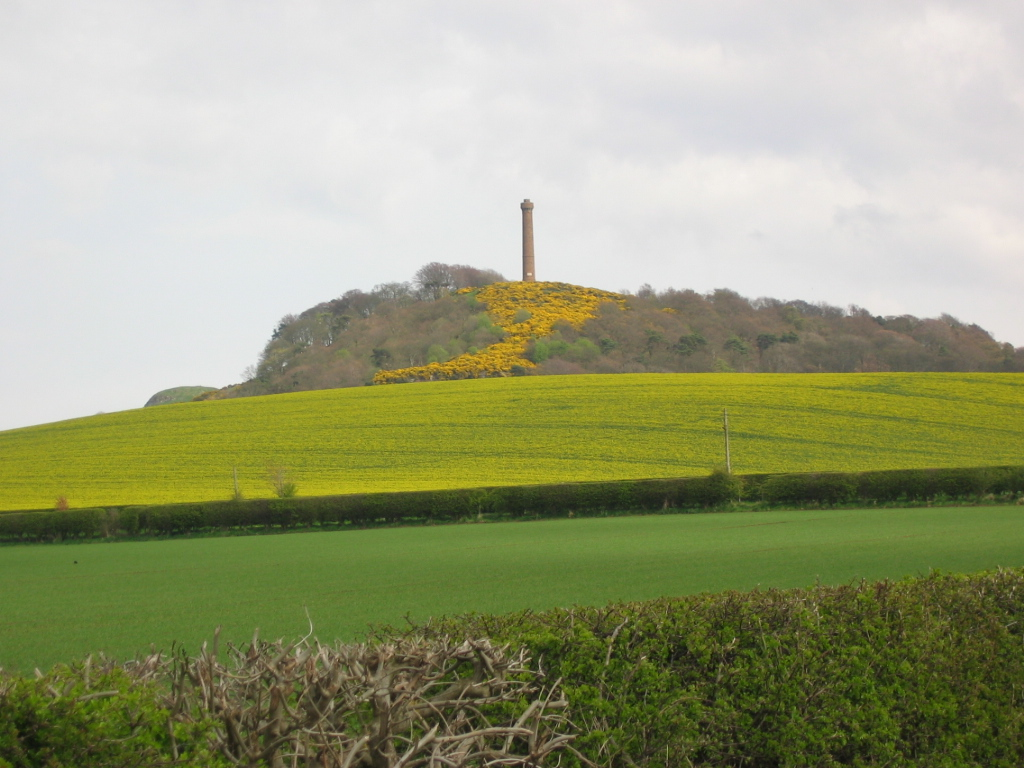
Hopetoun Monument

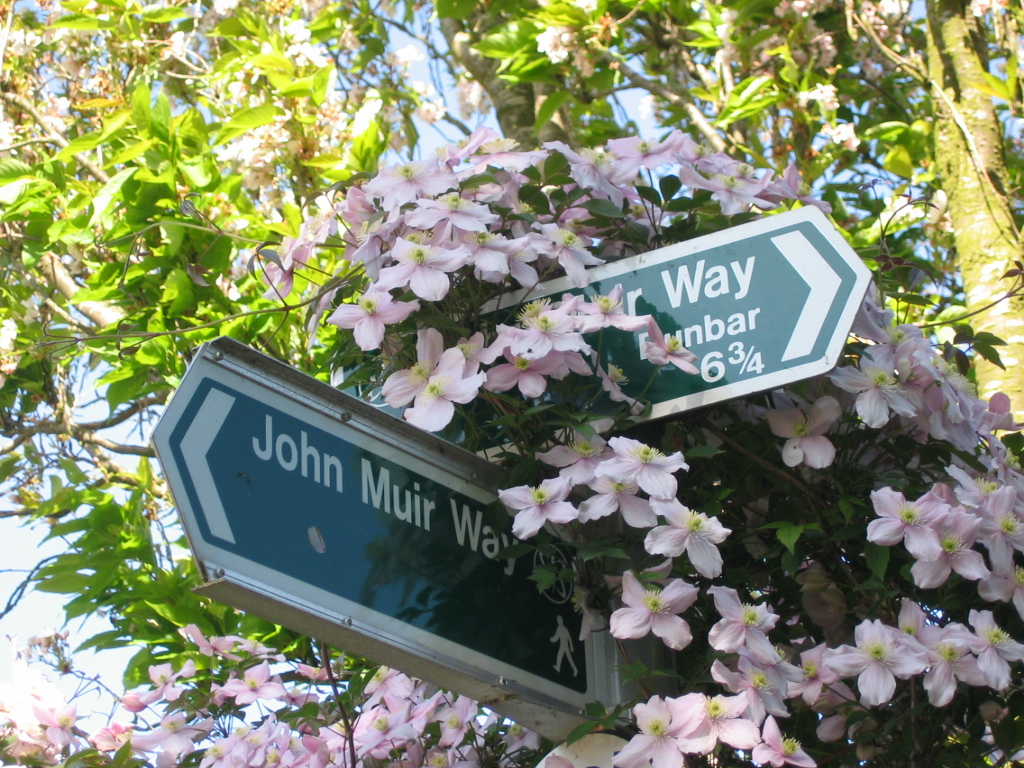
John Muir Way signpost

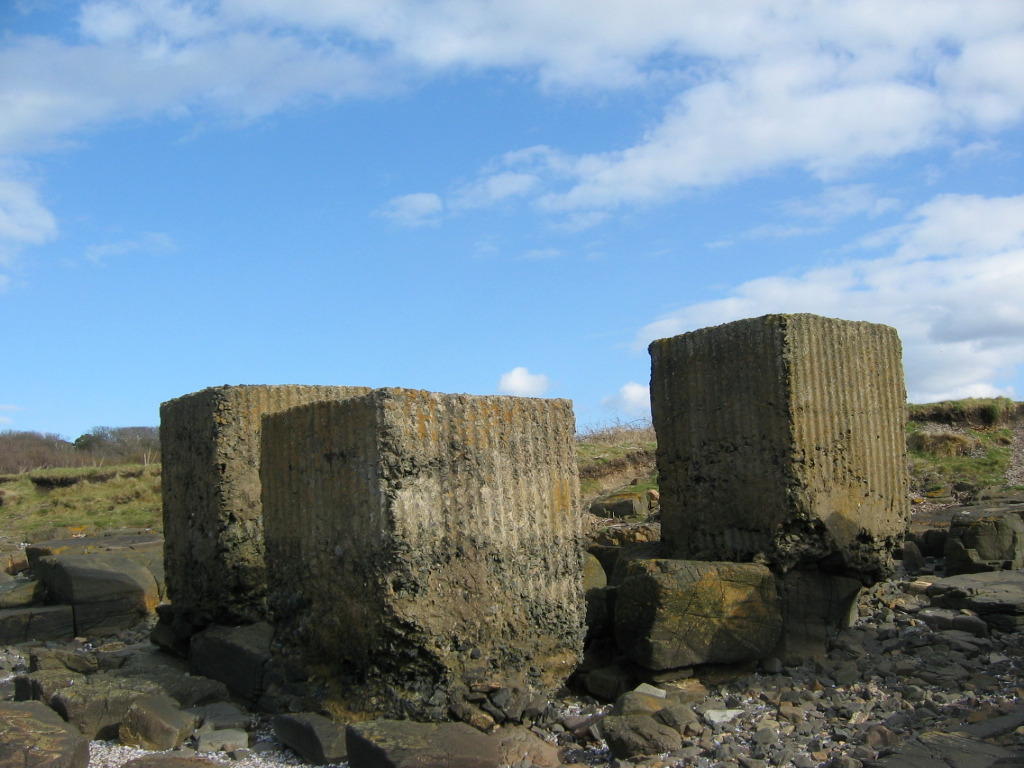
Longniddry Tank Traps

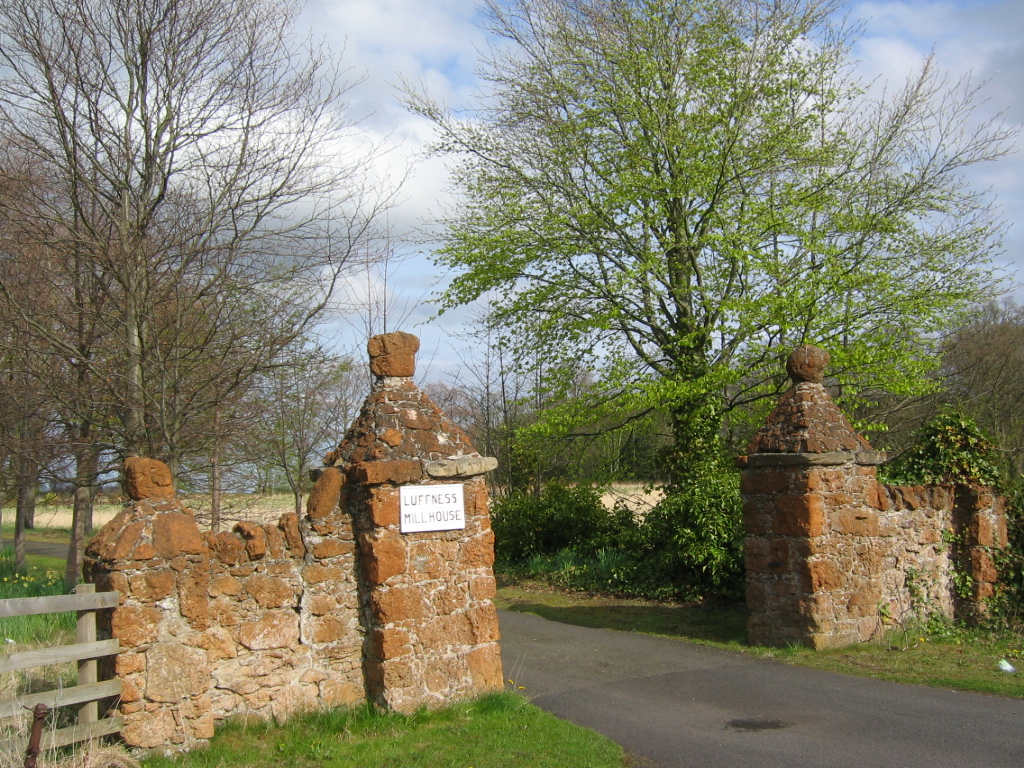
Luffness Mill House

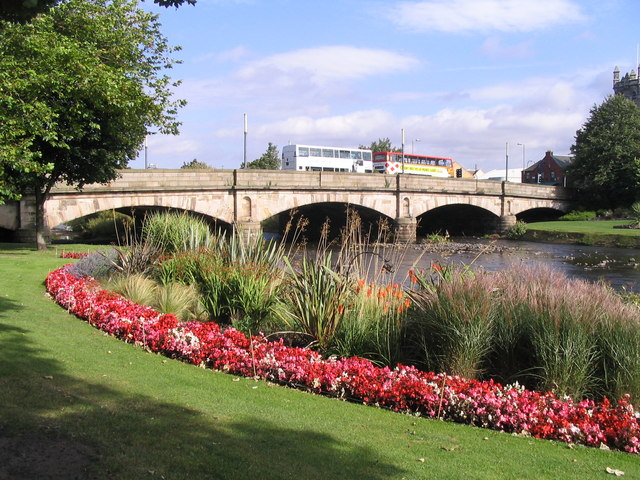
Musselburgh and the River Esk

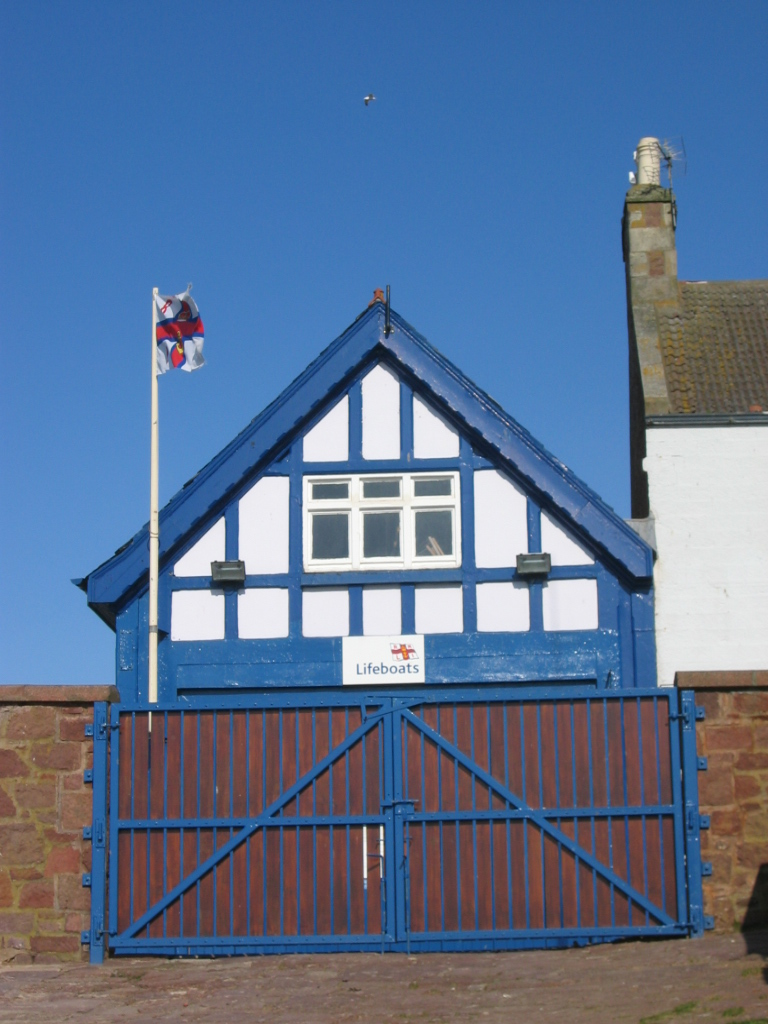
North Berwick Lifeboat

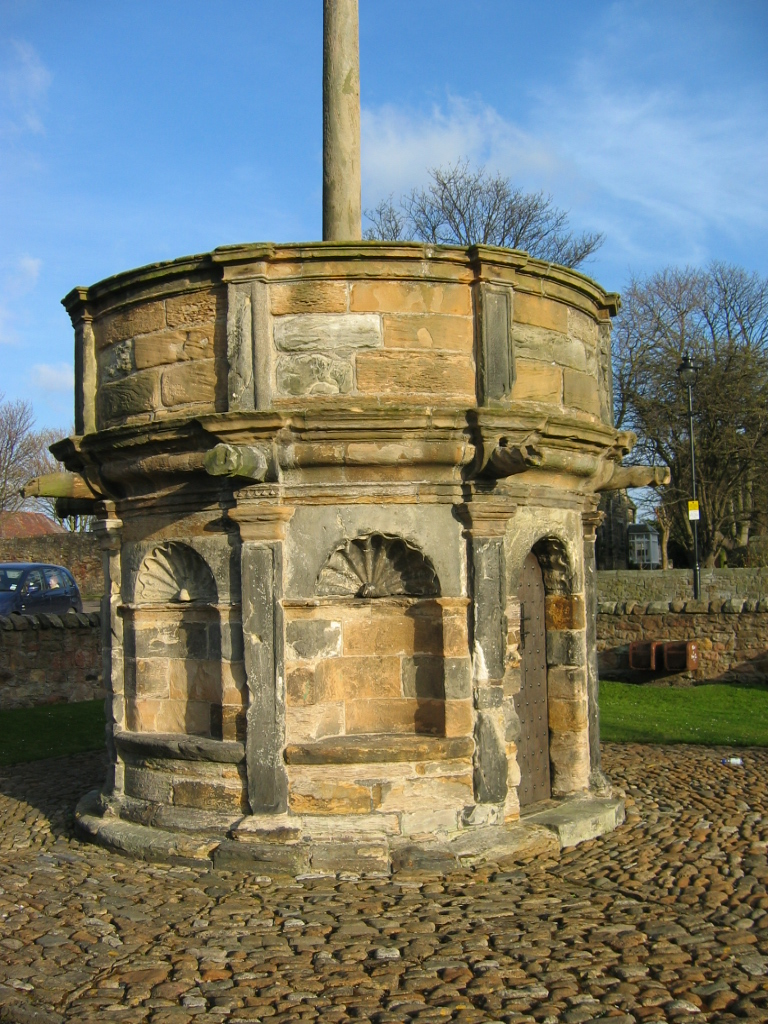
Mercat Cross, Preston, Prestonpans

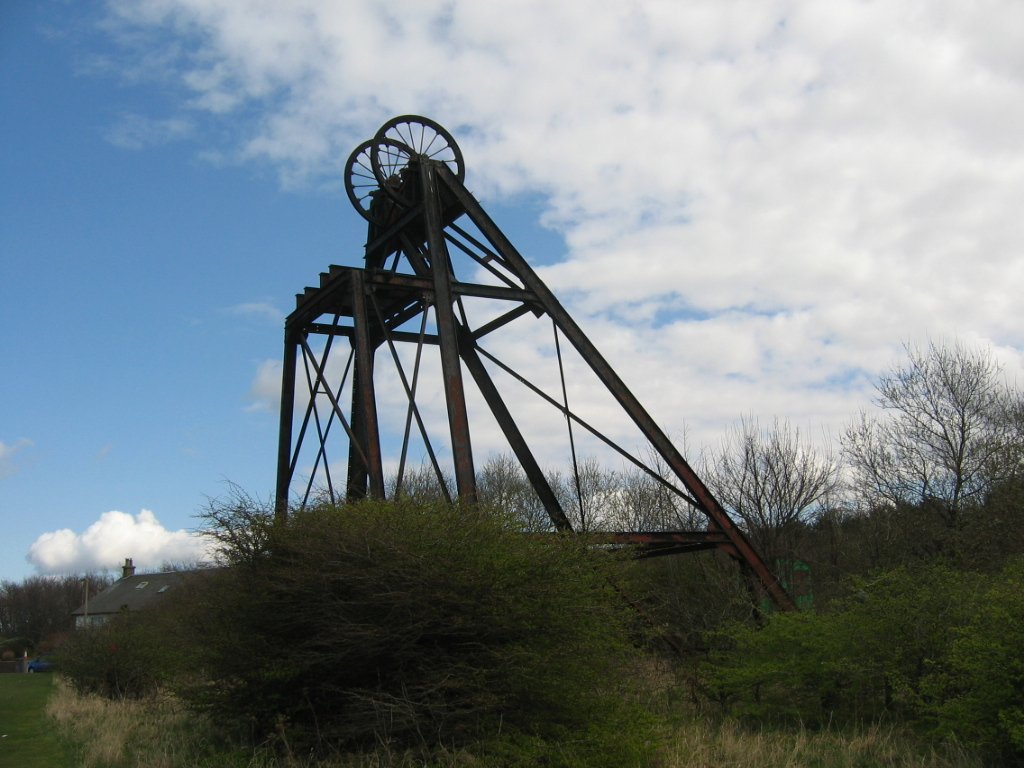
Prestongrange Industrial Heritage Museum

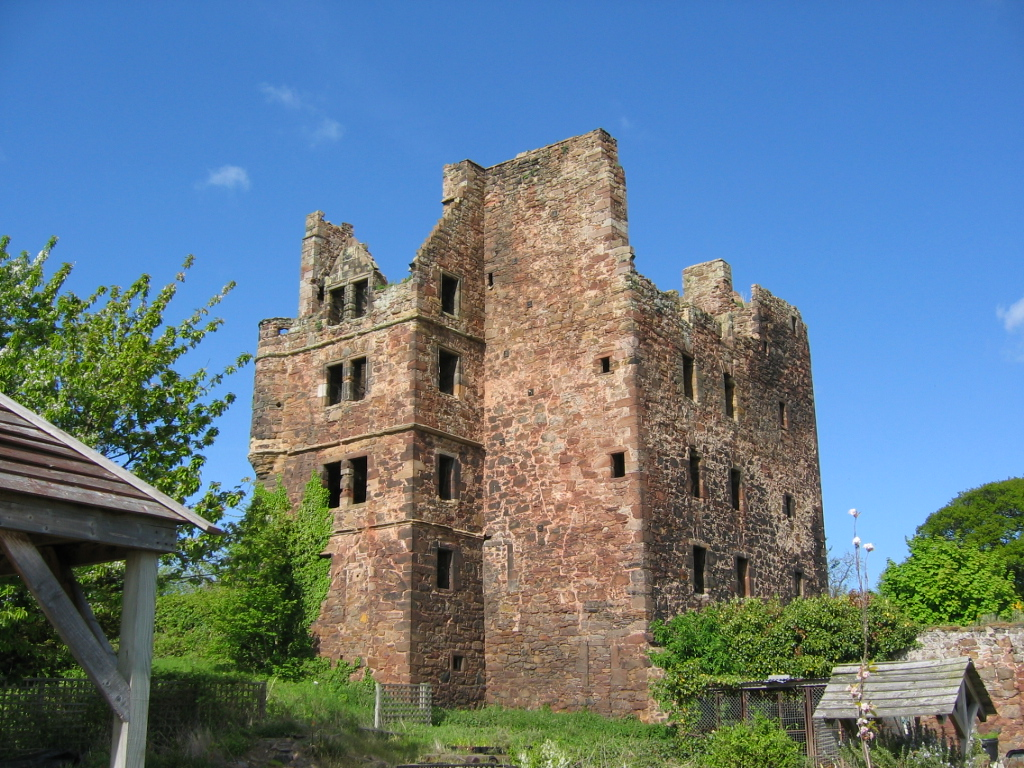
Redhouse Castle

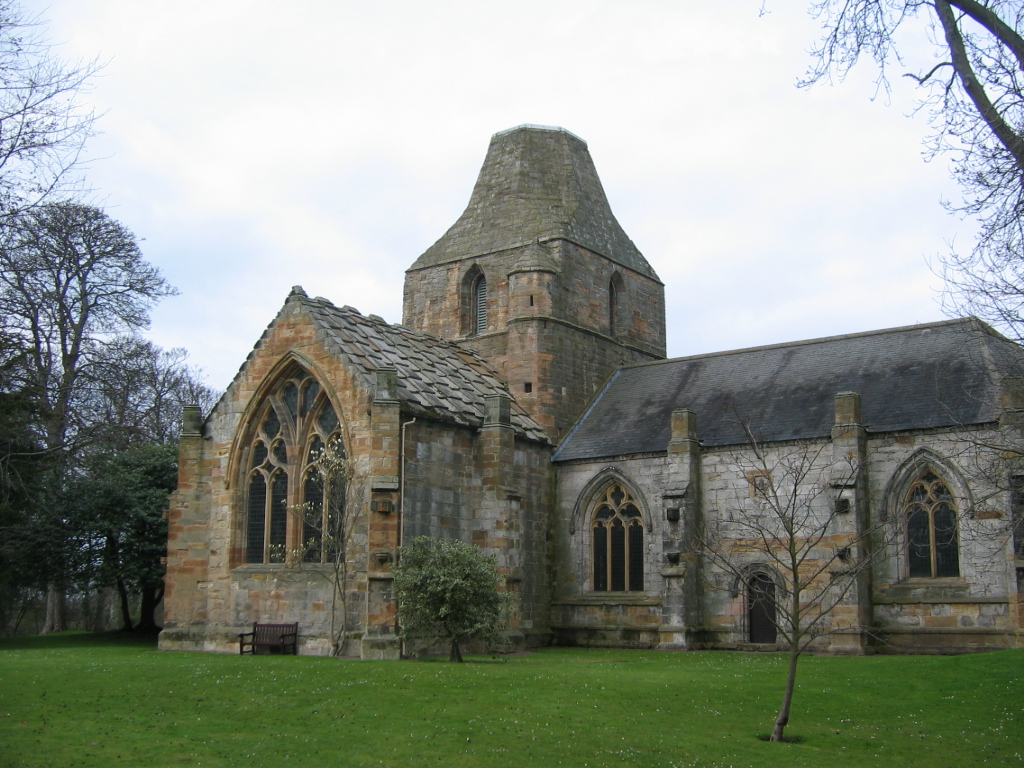
Seton Collegiate Church

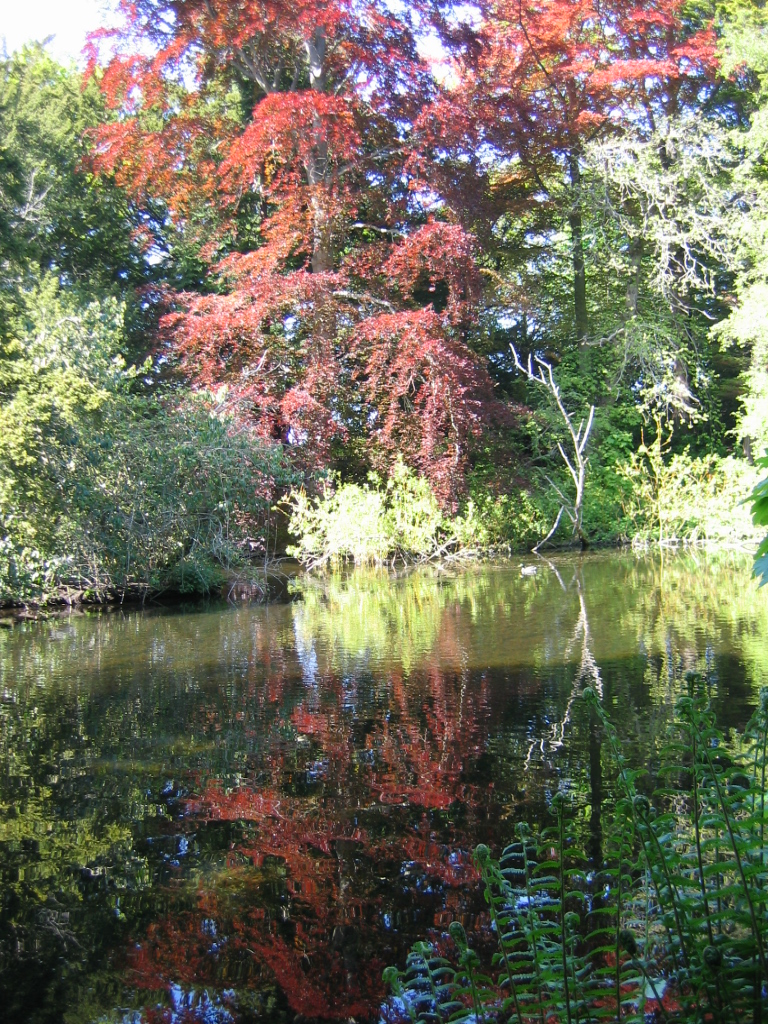
Smeaton Lake, East Linton

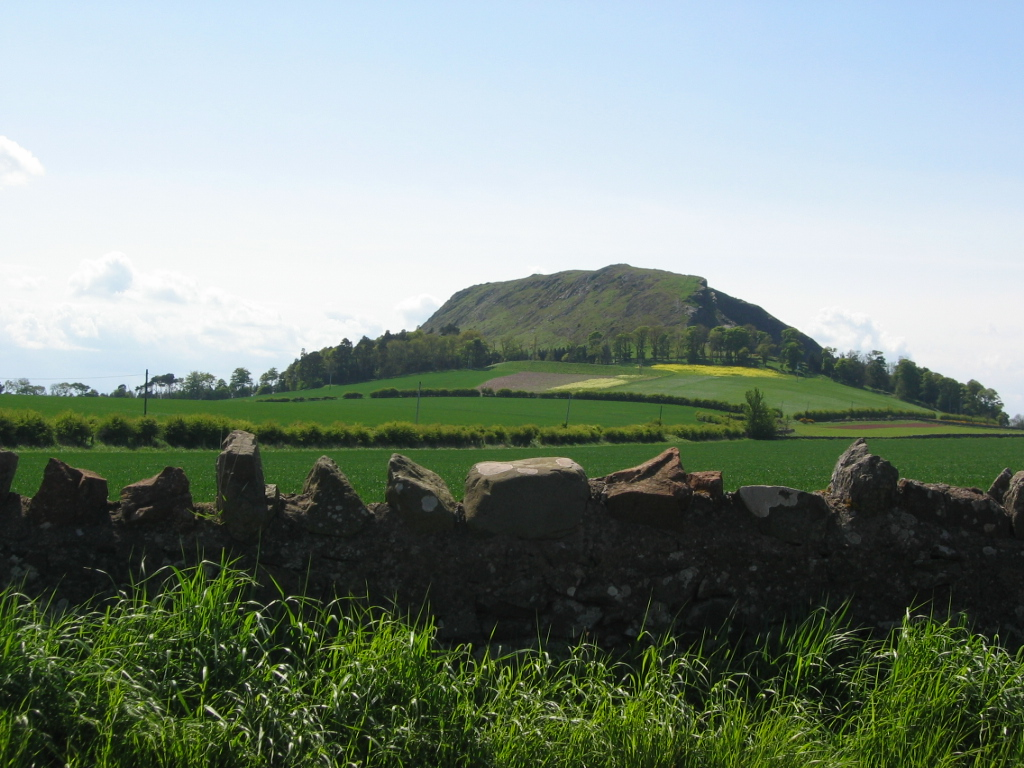
Traprain Law Hill fort

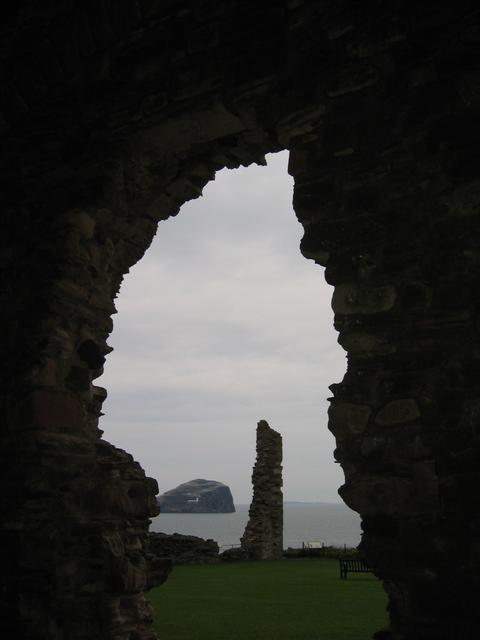
View of Bass Rock from Tantallon Castle

== A ==
- Aberlady, Aberlady Bay
- Archerfield Estate and Links
- Athelstaneford
- Auldhame & Scoughall

== B ==
- Ballencrieff
- Bara
- Barnes Castle
- Barns Ness,
- Bass Rock
- Battle of Carberry Hill
- Belhaven,
- Biel
- Bilsdean
- Birsley Brae
- Blindwells
- Bolton
- Broxburn
- Broxmouth

== C ==
- Canty Bay
- Carberry
- Castleton
- Cockenzie
- Cottyburn
- Craigleith
- Crossgatehall

== D ==
- Danskine
- Dirleton
- Doonhill Homestead
- Drem
- Dunbar
- Dunglass

== E ==
- East Fenton
- East Fortune
- East Links Family Park
- East Linton
- East Saltoun
- Elphinstone
- Elvingston
- Eskmills
- Eyebroughy

== F ==
- Fenton Barns, Fenton Tower
- Fidra
- Fisherrow
- Fountainhall

== G ==
- Garleton
- Garvald
- Gifford
- Gilchriston
- Gladsmuir
- Gullane, Gullane Bents

== H ==
- Haddington, Haddington Line
- Halls
- Hopetoun Monument
- Humbie

== I ==
- Innerwick
- Inveresk, Inveresk Lodge Garden

== K ==
- Kilspindie
- Kingston

== L ==
- Long Newton
- Longniddry, Longniddry Bents
- Longyester
- Luffness
- Luggate

== M ==
- Macmerry
- Markle
- Meadowmill
- Morham
- Morrison's Haven
- Musselburgh

== N ==
- National Museum of Flight
- New Hailes
- New Winton
- Newbyth
- North Berwick

== O ==
- Oldhamstocks
- Ormiston

== P ==
- Papple
- Peaston
- Pencaitland
- Pencraig Brae
- Phantassie, Phantassie Doocot
- Pitcox
- Poldrate Mill
- Port Seton
- Pressmennan Lake
- Preston, Preston Mill
- Preston
- Prestongrange
- Prestonkirk House
- Prestonpans

== S ==
- Samuelston
- Scottish Seabird Centre
- Scoughall
- Seacliff
- Skateraw
- Smeaton
- Spittal
- Spott
- St. Baldred's Cradle
- Stenton

== T ==
- Thorntonloch
- Thurston Manor
- Tranent, Tranent to Cockenzie Waggonway
- Traprain Law
- Tyne Mouth
- Tyninghame

== W ==
- Wallyford
- West Barns
- West Fenton
- West Pans
- West Saltoun
- Whitecraig
- Whitekirk
- Whittingehame

== Y ==
- Yellowcraigs

== See also ==
- List of places in Scotland
- List of places in Edinburgh
- List of places in Midlothian
- List of places in the Scottish Borders
