= Luffness =

Coordinates: 56.017°N 2.838°W

Luffness: Scottish Gaelic: Luibhneas
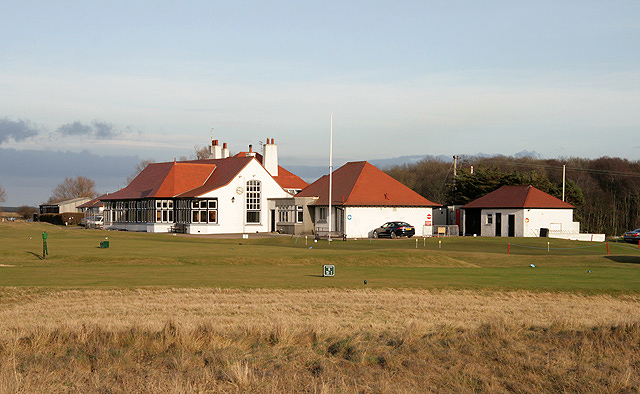
- The clubhouse at Luffness New Golf Course

- Location within East Lothian
- OS grid reference: NT477807
- Civil parish: Dirleton; Aberlady
- Council area: East Lothian
- Lieutenancy area: East Lothian
- Country: Scotland
- Sovereign state: United Kingdom
- Post town: LONGNIDDRY
- Postcode district: EH32
- Dialling code: 01620
- Police: Scotland
- Fire: Scottish
- Ambulance: Scottish
- UK Parliament: East Lothian
- Scottish Parliament: East Lothian

Luffness is a hamlet in East Lothian, Scotland. It lies between the towns of Gullane and Aberlady and is approximately 20 miles east of Edinburgh.

== History ==
Most of the houses in Luffness are traditional farm cottages; among its notable buildings are Luffness Castle (also known as Luffness House) and Luffness Mill. Luffness New golf course is part of the fine selection of courses in the area, and the Myreton Motor Museum is nearby.

== Gallery ==
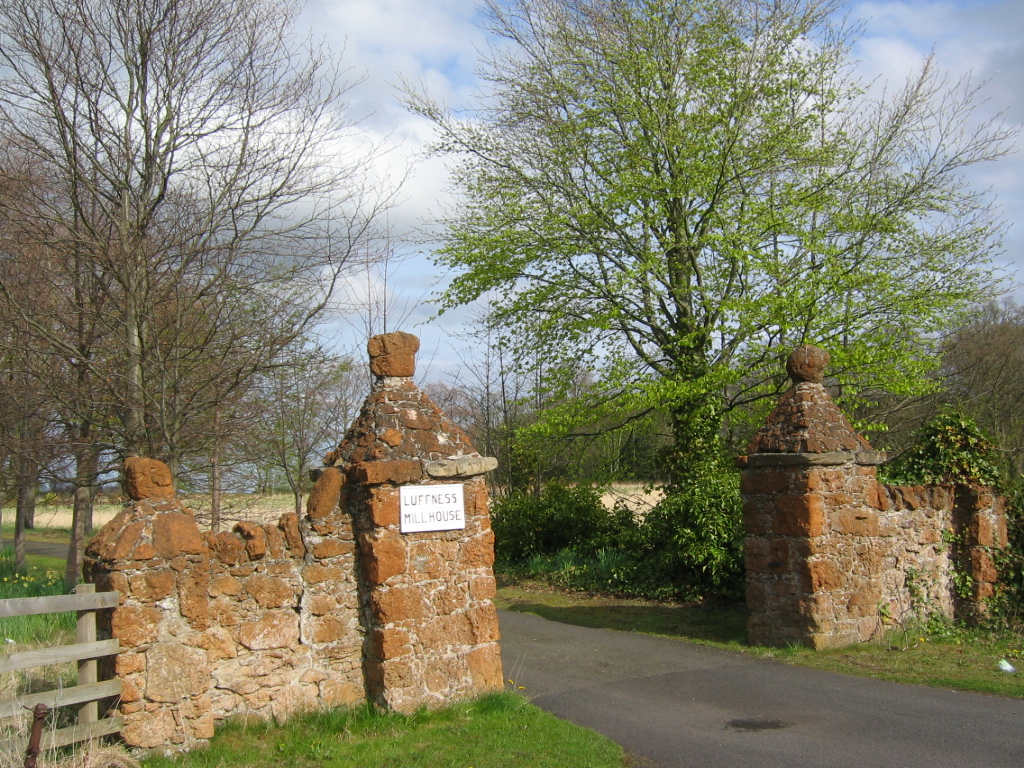
Entrance to Luffness Mill House

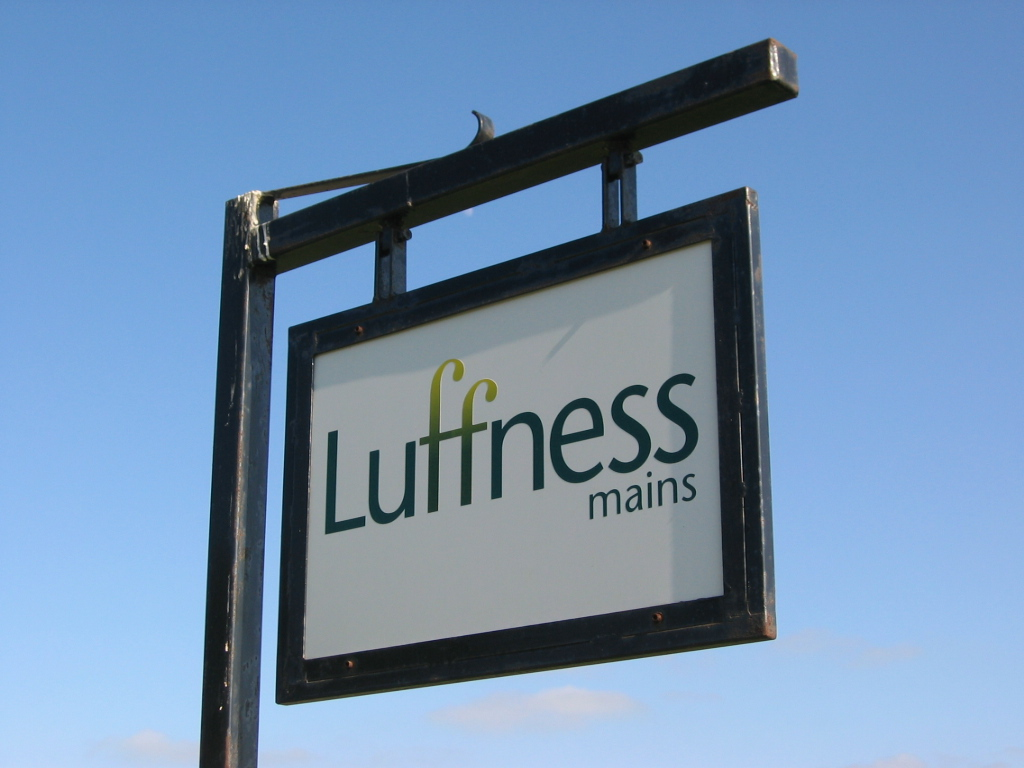
Luffness Mains Farm

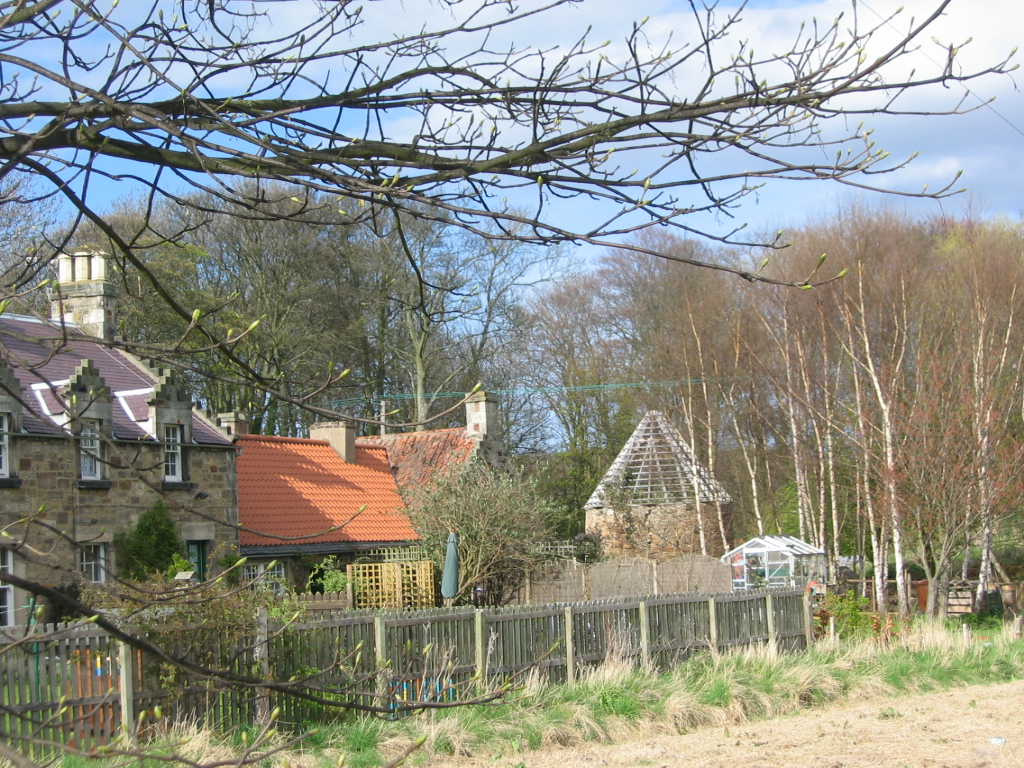
Old home in Luffness

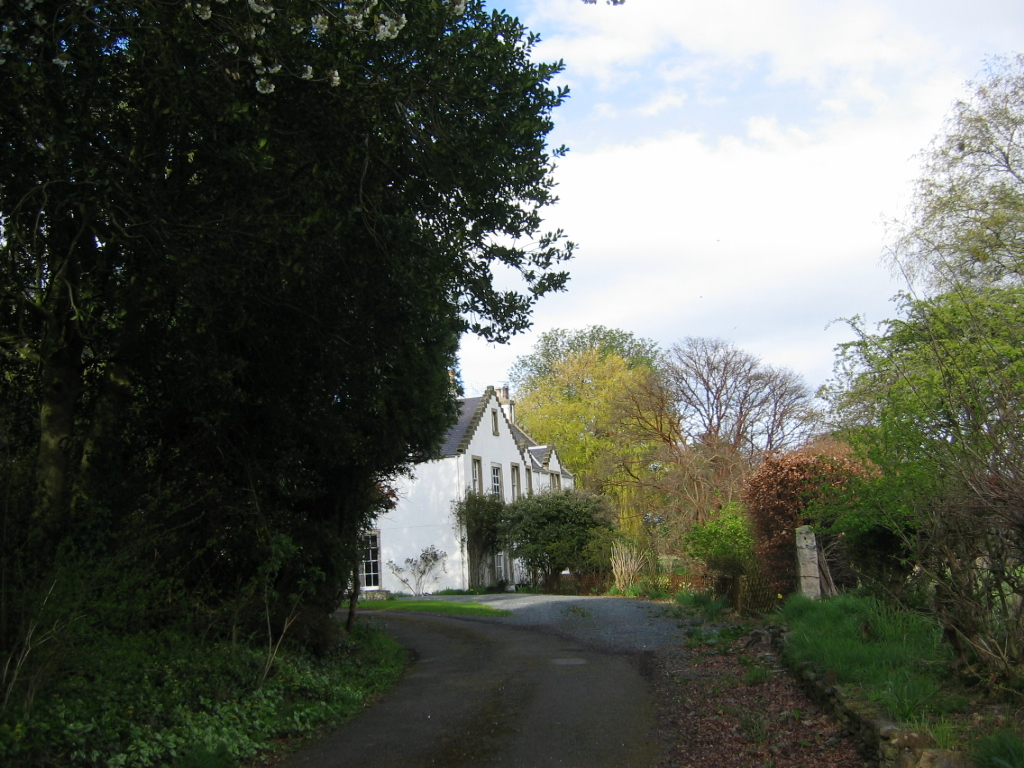
Luffness Mill House

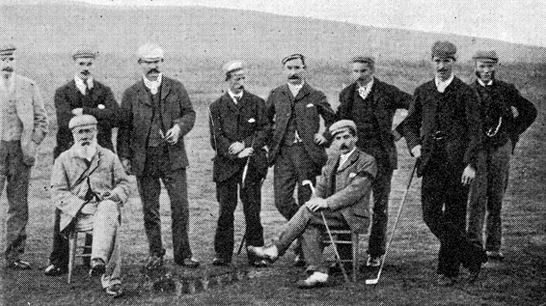
Old Tom Morris (seated far left) on 11 October 1894 at the New Luffness Competition.

== See also ==
- List of places in East Lothian
