= Gullane =

Village in East Lothian, Scotland

Coordinates: 56.037°N 2.827°W

Gullane: Scottish Gaelic: Gualainn
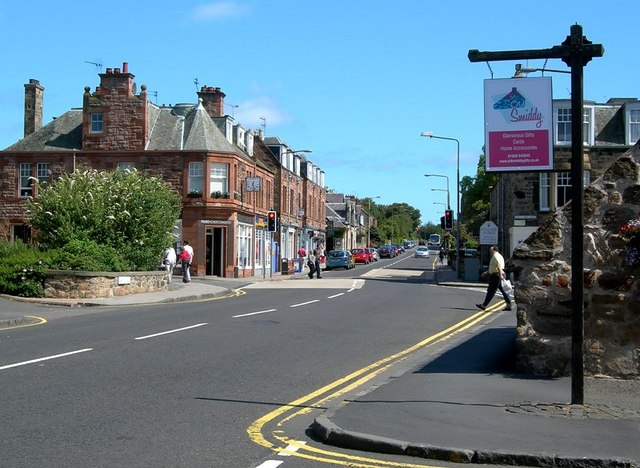
- Gullane Village, looking along the A198

- Location within East Lothian
- Population: 2,810 (2020)
- OS grid reference: NT486830
- Civil parish: Dirleton
- Council area: East Lothian
- Lieutenancy area: East Lothian
- Country: Scotland
- Sovereign state: United Kingdom
- Post town: Gullane
- Postcode district: EH31
- Dialling code: 01620
- Police: Scotland
- Fire: Scottish
- Ambulance: Scottish
- UK Parliament: East Lothian
- Scottish Parliament: East Lothian

Gullane (/ˈɡʌlən/ GUL-ən or /ˈɡɪlən/ GHIL-ən) is a town on the southern shore of the Firth of Forth in East Lothian on the east coast of Scotland. There has been a church in the village since the ninth century. The ruins of the Old Church of St. Andrew built in the twelfth century can still be seen at the western entrance to the village; the church was abandoned after a series of sandstorms made it unusable, and Dirleton Parish Church took its place.

Gullane Bents, the village's award-winning beach, is backed by large sand dunes that in recent years have become rather overgrown by invasive shrubs like sea-buckthorn. Gullane is part of the John Muir Way, a long-distance footpath along the coast between Musselburgh and Dunglass.

The local population includes a higher than average percentage of elderly people, but also attracts young families and commuters for Edinburgh. Urbanisation has led to some recent housing developments being approved on greenbelt land around the village, and Gullane is gaining popularity as a commuter village for nearby Edinburgh (22 miles or 35 kilometres away), despite the poor transport to the village. Amenities include the village hall and a variety of shops. There is a primary school, and local children attend secondary school (5 mi or 8 km) away in North Berwick.

== Toponymy ==
The etymology of Gullane is uncertain. It may come from Scottish Gaelic word Gualainn or A' Ghualainn. However, this could be unlikely, as East Lothian and surrounding regions were mostly outside of the Gaelic sphere of influence, even at the language's peak in the country around the 11th century. The region mostly spoke Old English, Middle English, or Early Scots, depending on the timeframe.

The village used to be known as Golyn. So the name could come from a Brythonic language (likely Cumbric) word lyn or linn (cognate with the Welsh word lyn/llyn, meaning lake.) This name may have come from a now drained piece of water that sat at or near the old parish church of St Andrews.

The name Golyn may also come from the Middle English work gōl (meaning boundary or limit.) This could be because Golyn parish (the kirk being moved from Gullane to Dirleton in 1632 by an act of the Scottish Parliament) was one of the most northern parishes of Anglo-Saxon influence in Britain in early medieval times, as anything north of the Firth of Forth would have been under the control of the Picts or Gaels. It is unknown if the area was named Golyn before or after the Scottish annexation. The church that served the parish was built around 1170, after East Lothian had been annexed by the Kingdom of Scotland. But the people of the time may have still viewed themselves as being Anglo-Saxons, or English, rather than Scottish.

== Buildings of interest ==
Greywalls Hotel was built in 1901 to a design by Sir Edwin Lutyens; the gardens were designed by Gertrude Jekyll. The Scottish Fire and Rescue Service formerly had their training school based at Gullane (which was relocated to new buildings in Cambuslang in 2013).

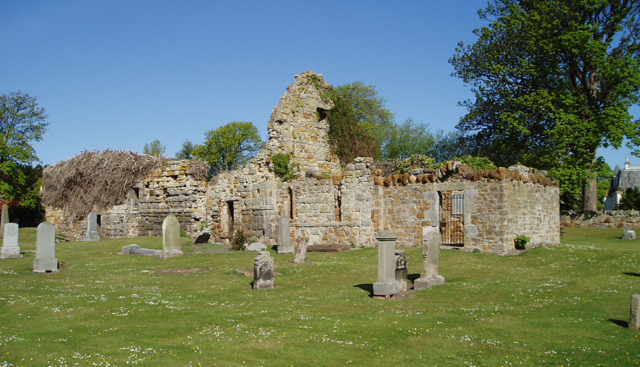
Old Church of St Andrew, Gullane

A roofless ruin, St Andrew’s Church or Kirk stands at the west end of the village, just north of Main Street/Rosebury Place. The ruin consists of a nave and chancel, with a late mediaeval chapel projecting to the north of the nave. Most of the walls stand to eaves height, but the west end is lost. Due to blocking of the chancel arch and later cross walls at the west end, the full extent of the church cannot be appreciated. The most notable architectural feature remaining is the Romanesque/Norman chancel arch, but only the outer band of chevron moulding can be seen from the nave due to the later blocking.

The earliest stone church seems to date to 1150–1200, most likely built by the de Vaux family, but with a number of later changes. The church was abandoned after 1612 when Lord Erskine of Dirleton successfully petitioned to build a new church in Dirleton. He claimed this was in part due to sand dunes engulfing the structure, ‘continewallie overblawin with sand’, although the likelihood of this has been questioned. In 1827, the Yule family took over the chancel as a private family burial ground, blocking the chancel arch in the process and possibly extending the chancel at that date. In 2010, a full record of the church remains was made, followed by consolidation works.

Gullane War Memorial was erected in 1914, reflecting both the immediate loss of life to the community, but also the emotional impact. Although not unique in having such an early memorial it is nonetheless unusual. Names were added as the war continued. The monument was designed by Sir Robert Lorimer.

== Golf ==
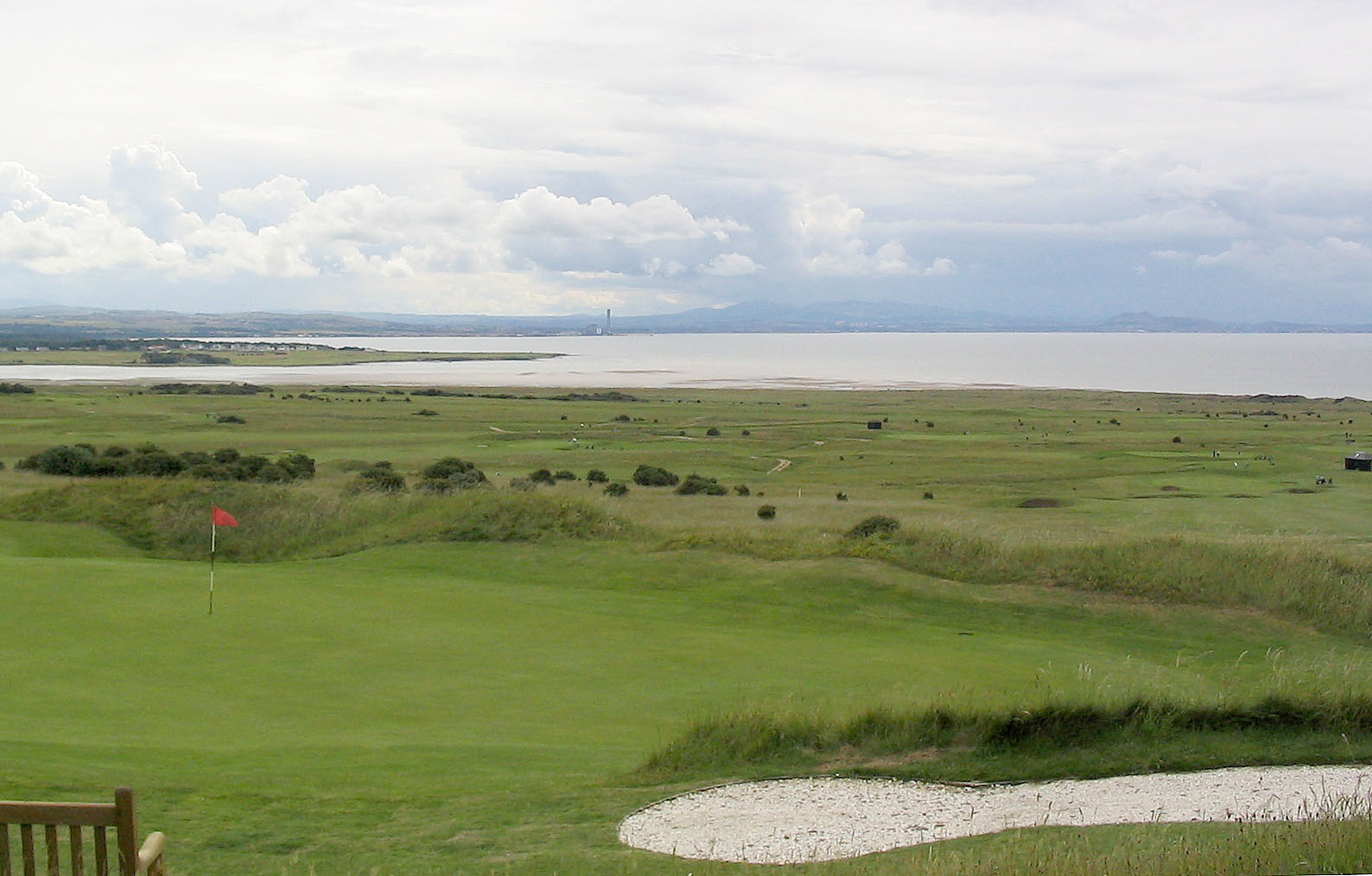
Aberlady Bay and Pentland Hills over the golf courses

Gullane is the home of Muirfield which has hosted The Open Championship on numerous occasions, most recently in 2013. In addition to Muirfield, Gullane is the site of several other golf courses in the village and surrounding area. At the Gullane Golf Club, three eighteen-hole links courses straddle a large grassed-over volcanic plug, of which a composite course hosted both the Scottish Open and Ladies Scottish Open in 2018.

From the top of the hill on each course there is a fine view over Aberlady and Aberlady Bay towards Edinburgh and the Forth Bridge as well as the coast of Fife and the Lomond Hills. Internationally acclaimed artist Frank W Wood painted a view of Gullane in 1933.

Abutting Gullane Number 3 course is the Luffness Golf Club course and a Children's Course.

Gullane Golf Club is featured in The Bloody, Bloody Banks: A Scottish Crime Thriller by Andrew Raymond, as a location of one of a series of murders.

== Notable residents ==
- Ronnie Corbett, comedian and TV personality
- Andrew Driver, professional footballer
- Quintin Jardine, celebrated crime novelist
- Sydney Mitchell, architect
- Ann Stokes, the ceramicist was born here at the manse in 1922

== See also ==
- Gullane railway station
- List of places in East Lothian
