= Myreton Motor Museum =

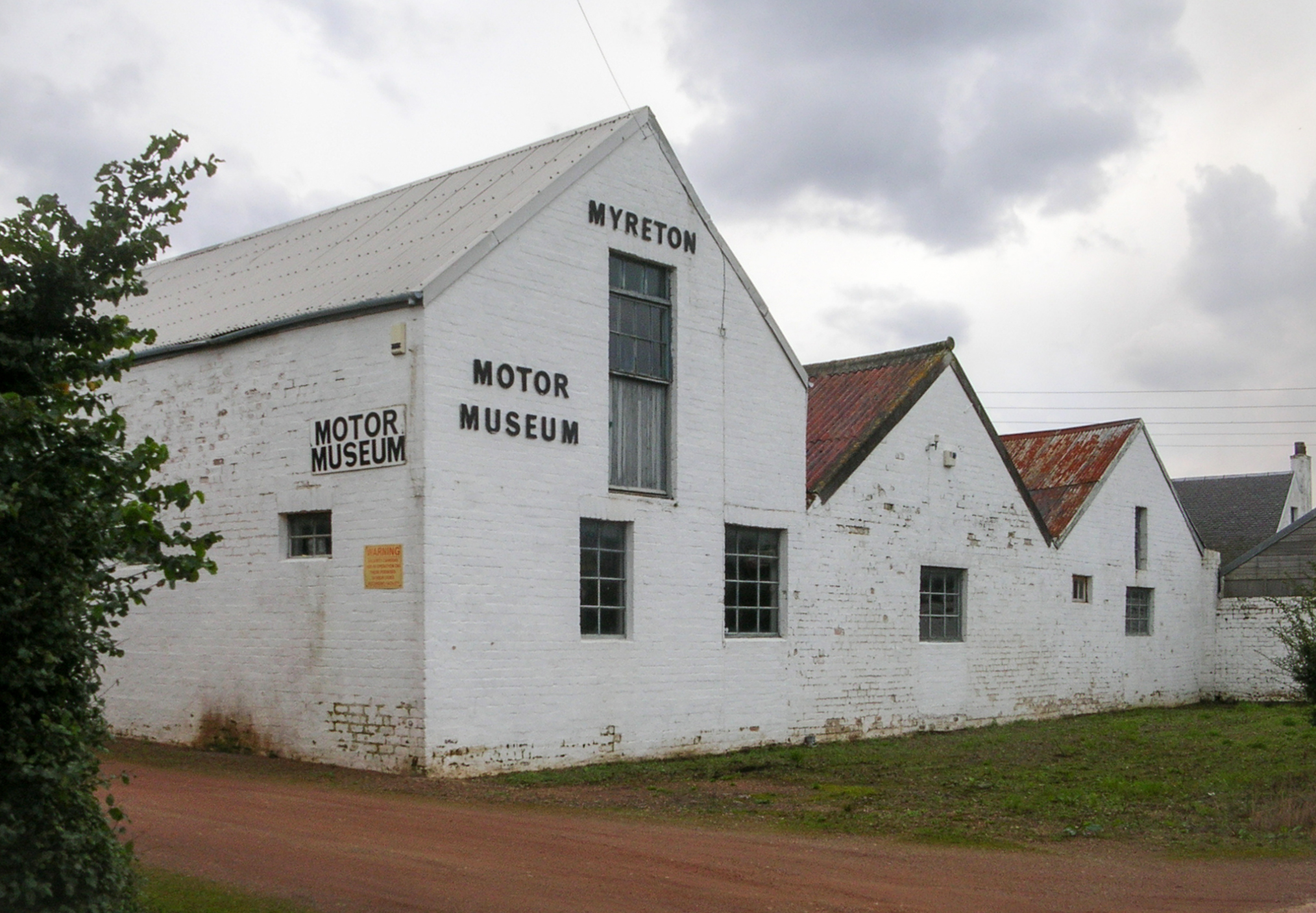
- Established: 1966; 60 years ago
- Location: Aberlady, East Lothian, Scotland
- Coordinates: 56.004°N 2.827°W
- Type: Transport Museum
- Parking: On-site (free)
- Website: www.myretonmotormuseum.co.uk

The Myreton Motor Museum is a museum located near the village of Aberlady, East Lothian, Scotland, which has a motoring history collection which covers most of the twentieth century.

== Collection ==
The museum holds a collection of commercial vehicles, cars, motor cycles, bicycles, motoring memorabilia, and toy cars dating back to the turn of the twentieth century. A notable exhibit in the museum is the 1989 Jaguar XJS which the British Member of Parliament Sir Menzies Campbell donated in 2006 to fulfill a commitment on environmental grounds that he had made during his successful campaign to be elected as leader of the Liberal Democrats political party.

== History ==
The museum was established in August 1966 by the late William ("Willie") P. Dale.
