= Shell Cottage =

Shell Cottage may refer to:

- a fictional place in Harry Potter
- the "shell cottage" or "cliff cottage" in Cullenstown, Ireland
- Shell Cottage, in the grounds of Carton House, Maynooth, Ireland
- Shell Cottage, Bucklesham, England
- Shell Cottage, in the grounds of Adlington Hall, England
- Shell Cottage, in the grounds of Château de Rambouillet, France, a monument protected by Centre des monuments nationaux
- Shell Cottage, a listed building in Aberlady, East Lothian, Scotland
- Shell Cottage, Shell, Himbleton, a Grade II* listed building in Wychavon, England
