= Whitekirk and Tyninghame =

Coordinates: 56.0257°N 2.6486°W

- Location within Scotland
- OS grid reference: NT596815
- Council area: East Lothian Council
- Lieutenancy area: East Lothian
- Country: Scotland
- Sovereign state: United Kingdom
- Post town: Dunbar
- Postcode district: EH42
- Dialling code: 01620 870xxx
- Police: Scotland
- Fire: Scottish
- Ambulance: Scottish
- UK Parliament: East Lothian
- Scottish Parliament: East Lothian

Whitekirk and Tyninghame is a civil parish in East Lothian, Scotland, which takes its name from the two small settlements of Whitekirk and Tyninghame. The two separate ancient parishes were joined in 1761.

== See also ==
- List of listed buildings in Whitekirk and Tyninghame, East Lothian
