= List of listed buildings in Oldhamstocks, East Lothian =

This is a list of listed buildings in the parish of Oldhamstocks in East Lothian, Scotland.

== List ==
Name	Location	Date Listed	Grid Ref. (Note: Sometimes known as OSGB36, the grid reference (where provided) is based on the British national grid reference system used by the Ordnance Survey. • "Guide to National Grid". Ordnance Survey. • "Get-a-map". Ordnance Survey.)	Geo-coordinates	Notes	LB Number (Note: Historic Environment Scotland assign a unique alphanumeric identifier to each designated site in Scotland, for listed buildings this always begins with "LB", for example "LB12345".)	Image
Bilsdean Bridge				55°56′42″N 2°22′52″W	Category B	14698	Upload Photo
Oldhamstocks, October Cottage With Retaining Wall				55°55′39″N 2°24′50″W	Category C(S)	14708	Upload Photo
Oldhamstocks, Market Cross				55°55′40″N 2°25′09″W	Category B	14711	Upload Photo
Oldhamstocks, The Wight House With Retaining Walls				55°55′39″N 2°25′06″W	Category B	14713	Upload Photo
Dunglass, New Bridge				55°56′29″N 2°22′12″W	Category B	14726	Upload Photo
Dunglass, Walled Garden And Service Buildings And Hot-Houses				55°56′28″N 2°22′55″W	Category B	14732	Upload Photo
Oldhamstocks, Bridge				55°55′33″N 2°24′25″W	Category B	14734	Upload Photo
Oldhamstocks, Mill Cottage				55°55′35″N 2°24′58″W	Category C(S)	18958	Upload Photo
Dunglass Collegiate Church				55°56′22″N 2°22′31″W	Category A	14700	Upload another image See more images
Dunglass, Gardener's House With Retaining Walls And Gatepiers				55°56′31″N 2°22′50″W	Category C(S)	14704	Upload Photo
Oldhamstocks, The Old Manse With Walled Garden And Boundary Walls				55°55′40″N 2°25′11″W	Category B	14709	Upload Photo
Oldhamstocks Parish Church (Church Of Scotland) With Graveyard Walls And Watch House				55°55′42″N 2°25′16″W	Category A	14710	Upload another image See more images
Oldhamstocks, Wellhead				55°55′40″N 2°25′05″W	Category B	14712	Upload Photo
Dunglass, Gazebo				55°56′17″N 2°22′48″W	Category A	14725	Upload Photo
Dunglass, Old Bridge				55°56′36″N 2°21′59″W	Category B	14727	Upload Photo
Dunglass, Old Gardener's House				55°56′30″N 2°22′59″W	Category C(S)	14728	Upload Photo
Dunglass, Farm Lodge				55°56′41″N 2°22′49″W	Category C(S)	14703	Upload Photo
Dunglass, Gatepiers At West Lodge				55°56′45″N 2°22′53″W	Category C(S)	14724	Upload Photo
Dunglass, Stables				55°56′23″N 2°22′35″W	Category B	14729	Upload another image
Dunglass, Viaduct				55°56′31″N 2°22′07″W	Category A	14731	Upload Photo
Oldhamstocks, Greenend Cottage				55°55′42″N 2°25′10″W	Category C(S)	14735	Upload Photo
Dunglass A1 Bridge				55°56′32″N 2°22′05″W	Category B	14699	Upload Photo
Dunglass, Farm Dairy				55°56′33″N 2°22′49″W	Category B	14702	Upload Photo
Stottencleugh Farmhouse				55°55′35″N 2°26′08″W	Category B	14714	Upload Photo
Dunglass, Sundial				55°56′23″N 2°22′28″W	Category B	14730	Upload Photo
Oldhamstocks, Braeview With Retaining Walls				55°55′40″N 2°25′04″W	Category B	14733	Upload Photo
Dunglass East Lodge With Gatepiers And Quadrant Wall				55°56′29″N 2°22′14″W	Category C(S)	14701	Upload Photo
Oldhamstocks, Hillcrest With Retaining Walls				55°55′39″N 2°25′08″W	Category C(S)	14736	Upload Photo

== Key ==
The scheme for classifying buildings in Scotland is:

- Category A: "buildings of national or international importance, either architectural or historic; or fine, little-altered examples of some particular period, style or building type."
- Category B: "buildings of regional or more than local importance; or major examples of some particular period, style or building type, which may have been altered."
- Category C: "buildings of local importance; lesser examples of any period, style, or building type, as originally constructed or moderately altered; and simple traditional buildings which group well with other listed buildings."

In March 2016 there were 47,288 listed buildings in Scotland. Of these, 8% were Category A, and 50% were Category B, with the remaining 42% being Category C.

== See also ==
- List of listed buildings in East Lothian
