= List of listed buildings in Athelstaneford, East Lothian =

This is a list of listed buildings in the parish of Athelstaneford in East Lothian, Scotland.

== List ==
| Name | Location | Date Listed | Grid Ref. (Note: Sometimes known as OSGB36, the grid reference (where provided) is based on the British national grid reference system used by the Ordnance Survey. • "Guide to National Grid". Ordnance Survey. • "Get-a-map". Ordnance Survey.) | Geo-coordinates | Notes | LB Number (Note: Historic Environment Scotland assign a unique alphanumeric identifier to each designated site in Scotland, for listed buildings this always begins with "LB", for example "LB12345".) | Image |
|---|---|---|---|---|---|---|---|
| Athelstaneford, The Brae, Bolton's Cottages | | | | 55°59′20″N 2°44′44″W | Category C(S) | 6299 | Upload Photo |
| Athelstaneford, Main Street, Athelstaneford Parish Church With Graveyard And Burial Enclosure | | | | 55°59′12″N 2°45′01″W | Category B | 6303 | Upload Photo |
| Athelstaneford, Main Street, Athelstaneford Primary School And Schoolhouse | | | | 55°59′11″N 2°44′48″W | Category C(S) | 6304 | Upload Photo |
| Athelstaneford, Main Street, West End Cottage | | | | 55°59′11″N 2°44′59″W | Category C(S) | 6317 | Upload Photo |
| Drem Farmhouse And St John's Chapel | | | | 56°00′21″N 2°47′25″W | Category B | 6323 | Upload Photo |
| East Fortune Airfield, Hangars 101/1, 100/Ii, 99/Iii | | | | 55°59′42″N 2°43′26″W | Category B | 6329 | Upload Photo |
| East Fortune Airfield, Control Tower 162/- | | | | 55°59′56″N 2°43′26″W | Category B | 6334 | Upload Photo |
| East Fortune Hospital, Stores, 17 | | | | 56°00′20″N 2°43′12″W | Category B | 6338 | Upload Photo |
| Garleton East, Garleton House And Castle Walls | | | | 55°58′51″N 2°47′16″W | Category B | 6347 | Upload Photo |
| Gilmerton Home Farm, Stables | | | | 55°59′24″N 2°43′38″W | Category C(S) | 6350 | Upload Photo |
| Nos 3-6 (Inc) Prora Farm Cottages | | | | 56°00′30″N 2°45′43″W | Category C(S) | 6357 | Upload Photo |
| Athelstaneford, The Brae (From S), Braehead Cottages | | | | 55°59′15″N 2°44′44″W | Category C(S) | 6300 | Upload Photo |
| Athelstaneford, Main Street, Staneford | | | | 55°59′13″N 2°44′49″W | Category B | 6312 | Upload Photo |
| Athelstaneford, Main Street, Stanford Cottage | | | | 55°59′13″N 2°44′49″W | Category C(S) | 6313 | Upload Photo |
| Athelstaneford, Main Street, The Cottage | | | | 55°59′12″N 2°44′46″W | Category C(S) | 6315 | Upload Photo |
| Athelstaneford, Main Street, Thorstone | | | | 55°59′12″N 2°44′52″W | Category C(S) | 6316 | Upload Photo |
| Drem, 6-11 (Inc) The Bield | | | | 56°00′23″N 2°47′13″W | Category C(S) | 6321 | Upload Photo |
| Drem, Drem Farm Steading | | | | 56°00′21″N 2°47′24″W | Category B | 6325 | Upload Photo |
| East Fortune, 1-6 (Inc Nos) New Row | | | | 56°00′20″N 2°43′26″W | Category B | 6343 | Upload Photo |
| Muirton Farmhouse | | | | 56°00′40″N 2°46′33″W | Category C(S) | 6355 | Upload Photo |
| Nos 1 And 2 Prora Farm Cottages | | | | 56°00′30″N 2°45′46″W | Category C(S) | 6356 | Upload Photo |
| Athelstaneford, Main Street, Abbotsford Cottage | | | | 55°59′11″N 2°45′00″W | Category C(S) | 6301 | Upload Photo |
| Athelstaneford, Main Street, Athelstaneford Dovecote | | | | 55°59′13″N 2°45′02″W | Category B | 6302 | Upload Photo |
| Athelstaneford, Main Street, Fairnielaw With Carriage House And Stables | | | | 55°59′10″N 2°45′01″W | Category B | 6308 | Upload Photo |
| Athelstaneford, Main Street, Oaklea | | | | 55°59′12″N 2°44′54″W | Category C(S) | 6310 | Upload Photo |
| Athelstaneford, Main Street, White Cottage | | | | 55°59′12″N 2°44′46″W | Category C(S) | 6318 | Upload Photo |
| East Fortune Hospital, Offices 11 | | | | 56°00′20″N 2°43′17″W | Category B | 6336 | Upload Photo |
| East Fortune House, Garden Walls And 4 Gatepiers | | | | 56°00′13″N 2°43′45″W | Category B | 6342 | Upload Photo |
| Garleton, East, Garleton Farm Cottages | | | | 55°58′52″N 2°47′17″W | Category B | 6345 | Upload Photo |
| Gilmerton House, South Lodge And Gatepiers | | | | 55°59′21″N 2°43′34″W | Category B | 6352 | Upload Photo |
| Kilduff House | | | | 55°59′12″N 2°46′37″W | Category B | 6353 | Upload Photo |
| Athelstaneford, The Brae, Rowan House (Formerly Elwyn House) Including Boundary Walls | | | | 55°59′19″N 2°44′44″W | Category C(S) | 49600 | Upload Photo |
| Athelstaneford, Main Street, Carrouse | | | | 55°59′11″N 2°44′52″W | Category C(S) | 6306 | Upload Photo |
| Athelstaneford, Main Street, Rowan Cottage | | | | 55°59′12″N 2°44′45″W | Category C(S) | 6311 | Upload Photo |
| East Fortune Airfield, Hangar 98/Iv | | | | 55°59′47″N 2°43′03″W | Category B | 6330 | Upload Photo |
| East Fortune Hospital, Loading Bay And Stores | | | | 56°00′20″N 2°43′09″W | Category B | 6340 | Upload Photo |
| East Fortune Steading | | | | 56°00′14″N 2°43′29″W | Category B | 6344 | Upload Photo |
| Garleton East, Garleton Farmhouse | | | | 55°58′56″N 2°47′16″W | Category B | 6346 | Upload Photo |
| Gilmerton House | | | | 55°59′26″N 2°43′27″W | Category A | 6351 | Upload Photo |
| West Fortune Farmhouse | | | | 56°00′07″N 2°45′04″W | Category B | 6358 | Upload Photo |
| Athelstaneford, K6 Telephone Kiosk | | | | 56°00′21″N 2°42′54″W | Category B | 6314 | Upload Photo |
| Athelstaneford Mains Steading (North Range) | | | | 55°59′09″N 2°44′15″W | Category B | 6320 | Upload Photo |
| East Fortune Airfield, Main Stores 111/25 | | | | 55°59′39″N 2°43′20″W | Category B | 6331 | Upload Photo |
| East Fortune Airfield, Main Workshops 108/28 | | | | 55°59′41″N 2°43′19″W | Category B | 6332 | Upload Photo |
| East Fortune Hospital, Welfare Office 13 | | | | 56°00′21″N 2°43′14″W | Category B | 6335 | Upload Photo |
| East Fortune Hospital, Nursing Administration Block, 15 | | | | 56°00′21″N 2°43′12″W | Category B | 6337 | Upload Photo |
| East Fortune Hospital, Driver's Office, 18 | | | | 56°00′20″N 2°43′11″W | Category B | 6339 | Upload Photo |
| Athelstaneford, Main Street, Cromdale | | | | 55°59′11″N 2°44′53″W | Category C(S) | 6307 | Upload Photo |
| Athelstaneford, Main Street, Home House | | | | 55°59′12″N 2°44′44″W | Category B | 6309 | Upload Photo |
| Drem, Drem Farm Lodge | | | | 56°00′20″N 2°47′12″W | Category B | 6324 | Upload Photo |
| East Fortune Airfield, Parachute Stores 109/27 | | | | 55°59′40″N 2°43′18″W | Category B | 6333 | Upload Photo |
| Drem, K6 Telephone Kiosk | | | | 56°00′23″N 2°46′37″W | Category B | 6434 | Upload Photo |
| Athelstaneford, Main Street (S Side From E), Bowling Green Cottage (Village Shop And Post Office) | | | | 55°59′12″N 2°44′42″W | Category C(S) | 6305 | Upload Photo |
| Athelstaneford Mains, Farmhouse, Garden Walls And Gatepiers | | | | 55°59′09″N 2°44′15″W | Category C(S) | 6319 | Upload Photo |
| Drem, Spylaw Cottage | | | | 56°00′20″N 2°47′11″W | Category C(S) | 6326 | Upload Photo |
| East Fortune Dovecote | | | | 56°00′14″N 2°43′37″W | Category B | 6328 | Upload Photo |
| East Fortune Hospital, Recreation Hall 3 | | | | 56°00′17″N 2°43′23″W | Category B | 6341 | Upload Photo |
| Gilmerton, Eight Arches | | | | 55°59′24″N 2°43′43″W | Category C(S) | 6348 | Upload Photo |
| Gilmerton Home Farm, Screen Wall | | | | 55°59′24″N 2°43′37″W | Category B | 6349 | Upload Photo |
| Kilduff Lodge | | | | 55°59′05″N 2°46′34″W | Category C(S) | 6354 | Upload Photo |
| Drem, Drem Farm Cottages, Wood Lane Cottage, Woodwell, Garve | | | | 56°00′22″N 2°47′18″W | Category C(S) | 6322 | Upload Photo |
| Drem Station And Station House | | | | 56°00′18″N 2°47′09″W | Category B | 6327 | Upload Photo |

== Key ==
The scheme for classifying buildings in Scotland is:

- Category A: "buildings of national or international importance, either architectural or historic; or fine, little-altered examples of some particular period, style or building type."
- Category B: "buildings of regional or more than local importance; or major examples of some particular period, style or building type, which may have been altered."
- Category C: "buildings of local importance; lesser examples of any period, style, or building type, as originally constructed or moderately altered; and simple traditional buildings which group well with other listed buildings."

In March 2016 there were 47,288 listed buildings in Scotland. Of these, 8% were Category A, and 50% were Category B, with the remaining 42% being Category C.

== See also ==
- List of listed buildings in East Lothian
