= List of listed buildings in Innerwick, East Lothian =

This is a list of listed buildings in the parish of Innerwick in East Lothian, Scotland.

== List ==
Name	Location	Date Listed	Grid Ref. (Note: Sometimes known as OSGB36, the grid reference (where provided) is based on the British national grid reference system used by the Ordnance Survey. • "Guide to National Grid". Ordnance Survey. • "Get-a-map". Ordnance Survey.)	Geo-coordinates	Notes	LB Number (Note: Historic Environment Scotland assign a unique alphanumeric identifier to each designated site in Scotland, for listed buildings this always begins with "LB", for example "LB12345".)	Image
Innerwick, Birrell's House, Garden Cottage				55°57′26″N 2°26′57″W	Category C(S)	7705	Upload Photo
Thurston, East Lodge With Retaining Wall And Piers				55°57′27″N 2°27′47″W	Category C(S)	7710	Upload Photo
Thurston Mains Farmhouse With Walled Garden				55°56′59″N 2°27′56″W	Category C(S)	7713	Upload Photo
Innerwick, Knock Cottage With Boundary Walls				55°57′27″N 2°26′51″W	Category C(S)	7716	Upload Photo
Innerwick, Tyme Cottage With Railings				55°57′26″N 2°27′01″W	Category B	7721	Upload Photo
Thurston Jubilee Horse Trough				55°57′24″N 2°27′32″W	Category B	7712	Upload Photo
Innerwick House With Gatepiers And Parapet				55°57′27″N 2°26′48″W	Category C(S)	7704	Upload Photo
Thurston Mains, Steading Cottage				55°56′57″N 2°27′58″W	Category B	7714	Upload Photo
Innerwick, Mansewood (Former Manse) With Stables, And Boundary Walls And Gatepiers				55°57′28″N 2°26′54″W	Category B	7717	Upload Photo
Skateraw Limekiln				55°58′15″N 2°25′14″W	Category B	7707	Upload Photo
Thurston Home Farm				55°57′45″N 2°27′32″W	Category A	7711	Upload Photo
Innerwick, Temple Mains, East Range, Cartshed And Granary, Threshing Mill And Engine House With Stalk				55°57′27″N 2°27′05″W	Category B	7720	Upload Photo
Thorntonloch Ingleneuk With Adjoining Cottages				55°57′43″N 2°23′56″W	Category B	7708	Upload Photo
Innerwick Parish Church (Church Of Scotland) With Boundary Wall And Gatepiers				55°57′28″N 2°26′56″W	Category C(S)	7718	Upload Photo
Thurston, North Lodge With Gatepiers				55°58′03″N 2°27′15″W	Category B	7715	Upload Photo
Skateraw Farmhouse With Retaining Walls				55°58′05″N 2°25′39″W	Category B	7706	Upload Photo
Thurston Dovecot				55°57′39″N 2°28′14″W	Category C(S)	7709	Upload Photo
Innerwick, 1 Temple Mains Cottages				55°57′29″N 2°26′59″W	Category C(S)	7719	Upload Photo

== Key ==
The scheme for classifying buildings in Scotland is:

- Category A: "buildings of national or international importance, either architectural or historic; or fine, little-altered examples of some particular period, style or building type."
- Category B: "buildings of regional or more than local importance; or major examples of some particular period, style or building type, which may have been altered."
- Category C: "buildings of local importance; lesser examples of any period, style, or building type, as originally constructed or moderately altered; and simple traditional buildings which group well with other listed buildings."

In March 2016 there were 47,288 listed buildings in Scotland. Of these, 8% were Category A, and 50% were Category B, with the remaining 42% being Category C.

== See also ==
- List of listed buildings in East Lothian
