= List of listed buildings in Stenton, East Lothian =

This is a list of listed buildings in the parish of Stenton in East Lothian, Scotland.

== List ==
Name	Location	Date Listed	Grid Ref. (Note: Sometimes known as OSGB36, the grid reference (where provided) is based on the British national grid reference system used by the Ordnance Survey. • "Guide to National Grid". Ordnance Survey. • "Get-a-map". Ordnance Survey.)	Geo-coordinates	Notes	LB Number (Note: Historic Environment Scotland assign a unique alphanumeric identifier to each designated site in Scotland, for listed buildings this always begins with "LB", for example "LB12345".)	Image
Biel House With Terrace Walls, Chapel Remains, Sundial, Boundary Walls, Gateway, Summer House, Archway, Kennels And Service Court				55°58′29″N 2°35′18″W	Category A	14764	Upload another image See more images
Biel Mill, Beech Cottage				55°58′24″N 2°36′13″W	Category B	14768	Upload Photo
Stenton Rood Well With Retaining Wall				55°57′41″N 2°36′15″W	Category A	14783	Upload another image
Stenton, East Green, Tron				55°57′34″N 2°36′29″W	Category B	14803	Upload Photo
Stenton, Main Street, Barn				55°57′33″N 2°36′27″W	Category C(S)	14805	Upload Photo
Stenton, Main Street, Mid House				55°57′32″N 2°36′30″W	Category B	14808	Upload Photo
Stenton, Stenton Primary School With Outbuildings And Retaining Walls				55°57′27″N 2°36′35″W	Category B	14814	Upload Photo
Stenton, West Green, The Smiddy With Outbuildings And Retaining Walls				55°57′28″N 2°36′36″W	Category B	14819	Upload Photo
Stenton, Stenton House With Stable Court, Retaining Walls And Gatepiers				55°57′35″N 2°36′24″W	Category B	14821	Upload Photo
Biel House, West Lodge With Gatepiers				55°58′27″N 2°36′22″W	Category B	14767	Upload Photo
Biel Mill Bridge				55°58′25″N 2°36′18″W	Category C(S)	14769	Upload Photo
Little Spott Cottages				55°57′56″N 2°33′06″W	Category C(S)	14773	Upload Photo
Little Spott Farmhouse				55°57′53″N 2°33′19″W	Category B	14774	Upload Photo
Pitcox Cottages				55°58′08″N 2°34′23″W	Category B	14776	Upload Photo
Stenton, Main Street, St Mary's With Retaining Walls				55°57′33″N 2°36′29″W	Category B	14777	Upload Photo
Stenton, Main Street, Wayside				55°57′33″N 2°36′29″W	Category B	14778	Upload Photo
Bielgrange Farmhouse With Terrace And Retaining Walls				55°58′19″N 2°36′47″W	Category A	14796	Upload Photo
Pressmennan Farm Steading And Stalk				55°57′10″N 2°35′43″W	Category C(S)	14802	Upload Photo
Stenton, Main Street, Floral Cottage				55°57′34″N 2°36′31″W	Category C(S)	14807	Upload Photo
Stenton, Main Street, Pantiles				55°57′32″N 2°36′31″W	Category C(S)	14813	Upload Photo
Stenton, The Wynd, Woodlea With Garden Walls				55°57′36″N 2°36′33″W	Category B	14815	Upload Photo
Stenton, West Green, Cottage				55°57′28″N 2°36′33″W	Category B	14818	Upload Photo
Deuchrie Farmhouse With Retaining Walls				55°56′05″N 2°36′17″W	Category C(S)	14772	Upload Photo
Newbarn Farmhouse With Retaining Walls And Gatepiers				55°57′54″N 2°35′54″W	Category B	14775	Upload Photo
Stenton, Main Street, Old Bakehouse				55°57′33″N 2°36′30″W	Category B	14809	Upload Photo
Stenton War Memorial				55°57′36″N 2°36′25″W	Category C(S)	14817	Upload Photo
Pitcox, K6 Telephone Kiosk				55°58′09″N 2°34′30″W	Category B	16845	Upload Photo
Biel Mill Lodge				55°58′25″N 2°36′12″W	Category C(S)	14770	Upload Photo
Stenton Parish Church With Graveyard Walls And Gatepiers				55°57′36″N 2°36′25″W	Category B	14782	Upload Photo
Biel, Beesknowe				55°58′31″N 2°35′32″W	Category B	14795	Upload Photo
2 And 3 Pitcox Cottages, (Gardener's And Shepherds)				55°58′07″N 2°34′32″W	Category B	14797	Upload Photo
Stenton, West Green, West Knowe				55°57′28″N 2°36′33″W	Category C(S)	14820	Upload Photo
Biel House, Dovecot				55°58′27″N 2°34′51″W	Category B	14765	Upload another image See more images
Pitcox Lodge				55°58′09″N 2°34′31″W	Category C(S)	14799	Upload Photo
Pitcox Smithy				55°58′08″N 2°34′36″W	Category B	14800	Upload Photo
Pressmennan Farmhouse With Terrace Walls And Gatepiers				55°57′08″N 2°35′41″W	Category B	14801	Upload Photo
Stenton, Main Street, Old School Hall With Retaining Walls And Gatepiers				55°57′29″N 2°36′32″W	Category B	14811	Upload Photo
Stenton, Main Street, Craigroy				55°57′34″N 2°36′30″W	Category C(S)	14806	Upload Photo
Stenton, Main Street, Old Playground Cottage				55°57′29″N 2°36′32″W	Category C(S)	14810	Upload Photo
Biel House, North Gatepiers				55°59′22″N 2°35′55″W	Category B	14766	Upload Photo
Biel Park Cottage				55°58′22″N 2°36′09″W	Category C(S)	14771	Upload Photo
Stenton, Main Street, Houses Adjoined To White Briar Cottage				55°57′31″N 2°36′31″W	Category B	14779	Upload Photo
Stenton, Mid Green, Daw's Well				55°57′32″N 2°36′34″W	Category B	14780	Upload Photo
Stenton Old Parish Church				55°57′36″N 2°36′28″W	Category B	14781	Upload Photo
Pitcox Farmhouse With Gatepiers And Retaining Walls				55°58′10″N 2°34′27″W	Category B	14798	Upload Photo
Stenton, East Green, Tron Cottage (Known As Church Officer's House)				55°57′35″N 2°36′30″W	Category B	14804	Upload Photo
Stenton, The Wynd				55°57′35″N 2°36′30″W	Category C(S)	14816	Upload Photo
Biel House Bridge				55°58′26″N 2°35′02″W	Category B	19859	Upload another image See more images
Stenton, Main Street, Old School House With Retaining Walls And Gatepiers				55°57′30″N 2°36′32″W	Category B	14812	Upload Photo

== Key ==
The scheme for classifying buildings in Scotland is:

- Category A: "buildings of national or international importance, either architectural or historic; or fine, little-altered examples of some particular period, style or building type."
- Category B: "buildings of regional or more than local importance; or major examples of some particular period, style or building type, which may have been altered."
- Category C: "buildings of local importance; lesser examples of any period, style, or building type, as originally constructed or moderately altered; and simple traditional buildings which group well with other listed buildings."

In March 2016 there were 47,288 listed buildings in Scotland. Of these, 8% were Category A, and 50% were Category B, with the remaining 42% being Category C.

== See also ==
- List of listed buildings in East Lothian
