= List of listed buildings in Humbie, East Lothian =

This is a list of listed buildings in the parish of Humbie in East Lothian, Scotland.

== List ==
Name	Location	Date Listed	Grid Ref. (Note: Sometimes known as OSGB36, the grid reference (where provided) is based on the British national grid reference system used by the Ordnance Survey. • "Guide to National Grid". Ordnance Survey. • "Get-a-map". Ordnance Survey.)	Geo-coordinates	Notes	LB Number (Note: Historic Environment Scotland assign a unique alphanumeric identifier to each designated site in Scotland, for listed buildings this always begins with "LB", for example "LB12345".)	Image
Humbie Parish Church With Broun Aisle And Graveyard Walls				55°51′49″N 2°51′47″W	Category B	7722	Upload Photo
Humbie War Memorial				55°51′25″N 2°51′54″W	Category C(S)	7723	Upload Photo
1 Shillinghill, Formerly "The Cottage"				55°51′06″N 2°51′45″W	Category C(S)	7726	Upload Photo
Drinking Fountain				55°51′10″N 2°51′42″W	Category C(S)	7727	Upload Photo
7 Shillinghill, Formerly "Rose Cottage"				55°51′09″N 2°51′37″W	Category C(S)	7732	Upload Photo
Sundial				55°51′07″N 2°51′39″W	Category C(S)	7735	Upload Photo
Humbie Dovecot				55°51′50″N 2°51′46″W	Category C(S)	7737	Upload Photo
Keith Marischal Home Steading With Sheep Pen And Dovecot				55°52′09″N 2°52′58″W	Category A	7744	Upload Photo
Chesterhill House With Retaining Walls, Quadrants And Gatepiers				55°50′35″N 2°52′11″W	Category B	12904	Upload Photo
Hazyhill				55°51′25″N 2°51′57″W	Category B	12905	Upload Photo
2 Shillinghill, Formerly "Park Cottage"				55°51′08″N 2°51′43″W	Category C(S)	7729	Upload Photo
9 Shillinghill, Formerly "Pettie Cottage"				55°51′07″N 2°51′37″W	Category C(S)	7730	Upload Photo
8 Shillinghill, Formerly "Sharon"				55°51′08″N 2°51′32″W	Category B	7734	Upload Photo
5 Shillinghill, Formerly "Village Hall"				55°51′10″N 2°51′40″W	Category B	7736	Upload Photo
Keith Marischal House South Lodge				55°52′00″N 2°53′05″W	Category B	7743	Upload Photo
Leaston Farm Grieve's House				55°51′43″N 2°49′23″W	Category C(S)	7745	Upload Photo
Humbie Mill Bridge				55°51′26″N 2°51′44″W	Category C(S)	7741	Upload Photo
Leaston House With Retaining Walls And Gatepiers				55°51′38″N 2°49′42″W	Category B	7746	Upload Photo
Johnstounburn House Coach House				55°50′38″N 2°51′51″W	Category B	7749	Upload Photo
Keith Bridge Cottage With Outbuildings				55°51′55″N 2°52′34″W	Category C(S)	7751	Upload Photo
Keith Marischal House With Garden Wall And Gatepiers				55°52′11″N 2°52′55″W	Category B	7752	Upload Photo
Humbie House With Quadrant Walls And Gatepiers				55°51′56″N 2°50′52″W	Category C(S)	7738	Upload Photo
Johnstounburn House Dovecot				55°50′47″N 2°51′51″W	Category B	7747	Upload Photo
Johnstounburn House, Gate Lodge With Entrance Arch, Quadrants And Retaining Walls				55°50′37″N 2°52′10″W	Category B	7750	Upload Photo
Pogbie House And Garden Wall				55°50′09″N 2°51′19″W	Category C(S)	13667	Upload Photo
Johnstounburn House With Garden Walls				55°50′44″N 2°51′47″W	Category B	7724	Upload Photo
Humbie House, Former Saw Mill				55°51′59″N 2°50′52″W	Category C(S)	7739	Upload Photo
Humbie Millhouse				55°51′28″N 2°51′44″W	Category C(S)	7740	Upload Photo
Scadlaw House				55°51′05″N 2°51′53″W	Category B	50795	Upload Photo
Highlea Farmhouse				55°52′10″N 2°51′19″W	Category C(S)	7725	Upload Photo
3 Shillinghill, Formerly "Ravelston"				55°51′09″N 2°51′42″W	Category C(S)	7731	Upload Photo
13 Shillinghill, Formerly "The School"				55°51′06″N 2°51′39″W	Category B	7733	Upload Photo
Keith Marischal House North Lodge				55°52′06″N 2°53′25″W	Category B	7742	Upload Photo
Johnstounburn House Summer House And Walled Garden				55°50′40″N 2°51′49″W	Category B	7748	Upload Photo
4 Shillinghill, Formerly "Harmony"				55°51′10″N 2°51′42″W	Category C(S)	7728	Upload Photo

== Key ==
The scheme for classifying buildings in Scotland is:

- Category A: "buildings of national or international importance, either architectural or historic; or fine, little-altered examples of some particular period, style or building type."
- Category B: "buildings of regional or more than local importance; or major examples of some particular period, style or building type, which may have been altered."
- Category C: "buildings of local importance; lesser examples of any period, style, or building type, as originally constructed or moderately altered; and simple traditional buildings which group well with other listed buildings."

In March 2016 there were 47,288 listed buildings in Scotland. Of these, 8% were Category A, and 50% were Category B, with the remaining 42% being Category C.

== See also ==
- List of listed buildings in East Lothian
