= List of listed buildings in Ormiston, East Lothian =

This is a list of listed buildings in the parish of Ormiston in East Lothian, Scotland.

== List ==
Name	Location	Date Listed	Grid Ref. (Note: Sometimes known as OSGB36, the grid reference (where provided) is based on the British national grid reference system used by the Ordnance Survey. • "Guide to National Grid". Ordnance Survey. • "Get-a-map". Ordnance Survey.)	Geo-coordinates	Notes	LB Number (Note: Historic Environment Scotland assign a unique alphanumeric identifier to each designated site in Scotland, for listed buildings this always begins with "LB", for example "LB12345".)	Image
Ormiston, The Old Hall, Adjoining Buildings, Former Stable Range And Walled Garden				55°53′53″N 2°56′36″W	Category B	19066	Upload another image
5 The Wynd, Lyn's Corner Shop And Avenue House				55°54′46″N 2°56′24″W	Category C(S)	19068	Upload Photo
Main Street, Ormiston House (Former Manse) With Out-Buildings, Railings And Retaining Walls				55°54′48″N 2°56′16″W	Category B	17559	Upload Photo
24 And 26 Main Street (Including Ormiston Post Office)				55°54′47″N 2°56′24″W	Category C(S)	17540	Upload Photo
Main Street, Dominic Molloy's Cottage				55°54′47″N 2°56′26″W	Category C(S)	17544	Upload Photo
Main Street, Fawns Park				55°54′47″N 2°56′14″W	Category B	17554	Upload Photo
Main Street, Moffat Monument				55°54′49″N 2°56′08″W	Category B	17556	Upload another image See more images
Main Street, Ormiston Parish Church With Retaining Walls				55°54′48″N 2°56′18″W	Category B	19058	Upload Photo
Ormiston Hall, Belsis Cottage And Walled Garden				55°54′04″N 2°56′21″W	Category B	19062	Upload Photo
Ormiston Hall Dovecot				55°53′45″N 2°56′28″W	Category B	19063	Upload another image
Main Street, Oak House With Retaining Walls				55°54′46″N 2°56′22″W	Category B	17557	Upload Photo
Ormistonhall Lodge				55°54′14″N 2°56′24″W	Category B	19064	Upload Photo
Ormiston Hall, South Lodge With Gatepiers And Walls				55°53′40″N 2°56′25″W	Category C(S)	19065	Upload Photo
High Street, Benham				55°54′45″N 2°56′29″W	Category C(S)	17539	Upload Photo
Main Street, Coach House				55°54′48″N 2°56′07″W	Category B	17543	Upload Photo
Main Street, Througburn				55°54′48″N 2°56′12″W	Category C(S)	19060	Upload Photo
Main Street, Beech House With Former Outbuildings And Retaining Walls				55°54′50″N 2°56′09″W	Category B	17542	Upload another image
Main Street, Beech Cottage				55°54′48″N 2°56′17″W	Category B	17541	Upload Photo
Main Street, Hillview				55°54′48″N 2°56′08″W	Category B	17555	Upload Photo
Main Street, Ormiston War Memorial				55°54′46″N 2°56′33″W	Category B	19059	Upload another image
Ormiston Primary School, Principal Range With Retaining Walls, Piers And Railings				55°54′41″N 2°56′28″W	Category B	19067	Upload Photo
Main Street, Cross				55°54′47″N 2°56′20″W	Category B	17545	Upload Photo
Ormiston Bridge				55°54′36″N 2°56′27″W	Category B	19061	Upload Photo
Main Street, Old Schoolhouse				55°54′47″N 2°56′12″W	Category B	17558	Upload Photo

== Key ==
The scheme for classifying buildings in Scotland is:

- Category A: "buildings of national or international importance, either architectural or historic; or fine, little-altered examples of some particular period, style or building type."
- Category B: "buildings of regional or more than local importance; or major examples of some particular period, style or building type, which may have been altered."
- Category C: "buildings of local importance; lesser examples of any period, style, or building type, as originally constructed or moderately altered; and simple traditional buildings which group well with other listed buildings."

In March 2016 there were 47,288 listed buildings in Scotland. Of these, 8% were Category A, and 50% were Category B, with the remaining 42% being Category C.

== See also ==
- List of listed buildings in East Lothian
