= List of listed buildings in Pencaitland, East Lothian =

This is a list of listed buildings in the parish of Pencaitland in East Lothian, Scotland.

== List ==
Name	Location	Date Listed	Grid Ref. (Note: Sometimes known as OSGB36, the grid reference (where provided) is based on the British national grid reference system used by the Ordnance Survey. • "Guide to National Grid". Ordnance Survey. • "Get-a-map". Ordnance Survey.)	Geo-coordinates	Notes	LB Number (Note: Historic Environment Scotland assign a unique alphanumeric identifier to each designated site in Scotland, for listed buildings this always begins with "LB", for example "LB12345".)	Image
Easter Pencaitland,1-4 (Inclusive) Ivy Cottage				55°54′41″N 2°53′10″W	Category C(S)	18908	Upload Photo
Easter Pencaitland, 7, 8, 9, 10 Park View				55°54′42″N 2°53′10″W	Category C(S)	18910	Upload Photo
1-23 (Inclusive) New Winton Cottages				55°55′47″N 2°55′14″W	Category B	18929	Upload Photo
Tyneholm House Stables				55°54′28″N 2°53′33″W	Category B	18938	Upload Photo
Wester Pencaitland Cartshed And Granary				55°54′35″N 2°53′48″W	Category C(S)	18940	Upload Photo
Winton House, Laundry Cottage				55°55′00″N 2°53′55″W	Category B	18949	Upload Photo
Easter Pencaitland, Pencaitland War Memorial				55°54′46″N 2°53′03″W	Category C(S)	18911	Upload Photo
Fountainhall Steading				55°53′53″N 2°55′04″W	Category B	18922	Upload Photo
Wester Pencaitland Mercat Cross				55°54′36″N 2°53′45″W	Category B	18944	Upload Photo
Winton House (Formerly Castle) With Terraces Railings				55°54′55″N 2°54′02″W	Category A	18948	Upload another image See more images
Milton House				55°53′42″N 2°52′28″W	Category B	18928	Upload Photo
Tyneholm House With Walled Garden				55°54′30″N 2°53′07″W	Category B	18936	Upload Photo
Tyneholm House Lodge With Quadrant Walls And Gatepiers				55°54′38″N 2°53′40″W	Category C(S)	18937	Upload Photo
Woodhall House With Terrace Wall And Railings				55°54′09″N 2°54′57″W	Category C(S)	18953	Upload Photo
Peaston, Grieve's Cottage				55°52′38″N 2°54′59″W	Category C(S)	47448	Upload Photo
Peaston Smithy And Smithy Houses				55°52′39″N 2°54′58″W	Category C(S)	47449	Upload Photo
Easter Pencaitland, Old Penkaet House With Outbuildings, Gatepiers, Gates And Retaining Walls				55°54′41″N 2°53′36″W	Category B	18909	Upload Photo
Easter Pencaitland, Schoolhouse And School With Railings				55°54′42″N 2°53′07″W	Category B	18915	Upload Photo
Easter Pencaitland, Winton House, South Lodge Gates And Gatepiers				55°54′42″N 2°53′23″W	Category A	18917	Upload Photo
Fountainhall Or Penkaet Castle, With Garden Walls And Gatepiers				55°53′54″N 2°55′08″W	Category A	18918	Upload another image See more images
Fountainhall Cottages				55°53′54″N 2°55′14″W	Category C(S)	18919	Upload Photo
Pencaitland Parish Church With Gatehouse Offertory Houses And Graveyard Walls And Gatepiers				55°54′39″N 2°53′32″W	Category A	18933	Upload another image
Saltoun Hall, West Lodge And Gatepiers				55°53′55″N 2°52′22″W	Category C(S)	18935	Upload Photo
Wester Pencaitland, Belfry Cottage And Old Schoolhouse With Retaining Walls And Railings				55°54′37″N 2°53′43″W	Category B	18939	Upload Photo
Wester Pencaitland The Cross				55°54′36″N 2°53′45″W	Category C(S)	18941	Upload Photo
Wester Pencaitland Trevelyan Cottage And Post Office				55°54′35″N 2°53′44″W	Category C(S)	18946	Upload Photo
Wester Pencaitland Tyneholm Cottages				55°54′35″N 2°53′43″W	Category C(S)	18947	Upload Photo
Wolfstar Farmhouse With Gatepiers				55°54′24″N 2°56′06″W	Category B	18952	Upload Photo
Easter Pencaitland, Winton House, South Lodge				55°54′42″N 2°53′24″W	Category B	18916	Upload Photo
Fountainhall Stables				55°53′55″N 2°55′12″W	Category C(S)	18921	Upload Photo
Glenkinchie Distillery, Malt Barns (Museum)And Stalk				55°53′28″N 2°53′28″W	Category B	18923	Upload Photo
Lempockwells Farmhouse				55°53′49″N 2°52′59″W	Category B	18926	Upload Photo
Pencaitland Bridge				55°54′39″N 2°53′38″W	Category B	18931	Upload Photo
Saltoun Hall Dovecot				55°54′23″N 2°51′59″W	Category B	18934	Upload Photo
Wester Pencaitland Farm Dovecot				55°54′37″N 2°53′49″W	Category A	18942	Upload another image
Wester Pencaitland, Lempockwells Road Pencaet Workshop				55°53′28″N 2°53′40″W	Category C(S)	18943	Upload Photo
Wester Pencaitland Temperance Hall With Railings				55°54′37″N 2°53′45″W	Category C(S)	18945	Upload Photo
Winton House North Lodge With Gates				55°55′12″N 2°54′21″W	Category A	18950	Upload another image
Easter Pencaitland, St Michaels Lodge With Retaining Walls And Gatepiers				55°54′42″N 2°53′14″W	Category B	18913	Upload Photo
Peaston Farmhouse				55°52′41″N 2°55′00″W	Category C(S)	18930	Upload Photo
Fountainhall Dovecots				55°53′55″N 2°55′05″W	Category B	18920	Upload another image
Huntlaw Farmhouse				55°53′58″N 2°54′10″W	Category B	18924	Upload Photo
Huntlaw Steading				55°53′56″N 2°54′07″W	Category B	18925	Upload Photo
Pencaitland Manse With Terrace Walls Gatepiers And Stable Court				55°54′39″N 2°53′31″W	Category B	18932	Upload Photo
Winton House Stables				55°55′00″N 2°54′01″W	Category C(S)	18951	Upload Photo
Easter Pencaitland, Penkaet House				55°54′41″N 2°53′36″W	Category B	18912	Upload Photo
Milton Bridge				55°53′31″N 2°52′07″W	Category B	18927	Upload Photo

== Key ==
The scheme for classifying buildings in Scotland is:

- Category A: "buildings of national or international importance, either architectural or historic; or fine, little-altered examples of some particular period, style or building type."
- Category B: "buildings of regional or more than local importance; or major examples of some particular period, style or building type, which may have been altered."
- Category C: "buildings of local importance; lesser examples of any period, style, or building type, as originally constructed or moderately altered; and simple traditional buildings which group well with other listed buildings."

In March 2016 there were 47,288 listed buildings in Scotland. Of these, 8% were Category A, and 50% were Category B, with the remaining 42% being Category C.

== See also ==
- List of listed buildings in East Lothian
