= List of listed buildings in Saltoun, East Lothian =

This is a list of listed buildings in the parish of Saltoun in East Lothian, Scotland.

== List ==
Name	Location	Date Listed	Grid Ref. (Note: Sometimes known as OSGB36, the grid reference (where provided) is based on the British national grid reference system used by the Ordnance Survey. • "Guide to National Grid". Ordnance Survey. • "Get-a-map". Ordnance Survey.)	Geo-coordinates	Notes	LB Number (Note: Historic Environment Scotland assign a unique alphanumeric identifier to each designated site in Scotland, for listed buildings this always begins with "LB", for example "LB12345".)	Image
West Saltoun, Main Street, Thornylee Cottage				55°53′46″N 2°51′50″W	Category C(S)	18905	Upload Photo
West Saltoun, Milton Bridge, Barley Mill				55°53′25″N 2°52′01″W	Category B	18906	Upload Photo
West Saltoun, Milton Bridge, Barley Mill House With Outbuildings And Retaining Walls				55°53′25″N 2°52′05″W	Category B	18907	Upload Photo
East Saltoun, Main Street, 1, 2 And 3 Saltoun Cottages				55°54′03″N 2°50′27″W	Category C(S)	18882	Upload Photo
East Saltoun, 4-9 (Inclusive) Main Street				55°54′01″N 2°50′26″W	Category C(S)	18883	Upload Photo
Saltoun Hall, South Lodge With Quadrant Walls, Gatepiers And Gates				55°54′15″N 2°51′28″W	Category B	18897	Upload Photo
East Mains Cartshed And Granary With Cottage				55°54′38″N 2°49′48″W	Category C(S)	18876	Upload Photo
East Mains Farmhouse				55°54′37″N 2°49′48″W	Category C(S)	18877	Upload Photo
East Saltoun, Old Castle With Retaining Walls				55°54′06″N 2°50′31″W	Category B	18884	Upload Photo
Herdmanston Chapel				55°55′07″N 2°50′49″W	Category B	18890	Upload Photo
Herdmanston Dovecot				55°55′12″N 2°50′53″W	Category B	18891	Upload another image
West Saltoun,1 And 2 The Kennels (Former Fletcher Dower House)				55°53′50″N 2°51′46″W	Category B	18903	Upload Photo
Saltoun Home Farm With Retaining Walls And Piers				55°54′35″N 2°51′26″W	Category B	19112	Upload Photo
East Saltoun Farmhouse				55°54′05″N 2°50′27″W	Category C(S)	18879	Upload Photo
Gilchriston Farmhouse				55°52′39″N 2°49′50″W	Category B	18889	Upload Photo
Saltoun Hall, With Terrace Wall And Enclousure				55°54′22″N 2°51′51″W	Category A	18895	Upload another image See more images
East Saltoun, Elmbank And Walney With Retaining Wall				55°54′08″N 2°50′33″W	Category B	18878	Upload Photo
East Saltoun, Fountain Cottage				55°54′02″N 2°50′28″W	Category C(S)	18881	Upload Photo
Middlemains Farmhouse				55°54′34″N 2°50′54″W	Category B	18893	Upload Photo
Middlemains Lime Kilns				55°54′46″N 2°50′42″W	Category B	18894	Upload Photo
Saltoun Hall, North Lodges				55°54′39″N 2°51′57″W	Category C(S)	18898	Upload another image
Saltoun Hall Stables, Carriage House And Cistern-Head				55°54′19″N 2°51′41″W	Category A	18899	Upload Photo
West Blance Farmhouse				55°54′33″N 2°49′06″W	Category B	18902	Upload Photo
East Saltoun Fletcher Memorial Fountain				55°54′03″N 2°50′29″W	Category B	18880	Upload another image See more images
East Saltoun, Saltoun Hill (Former Manse) With Gates, Gatepiers And Retaining Walls				55°54′02″N 2°50′23″W	Category B	18886	Upload Photo
East Saltoun, Smithy				55°53′58″N 2°50′22″W	Category C(S)	18887	Upload another image
Saltoun Hall, Garden Cottage				55°54′36″N 2°52′09″W	Category B	18896	Upload Photo
Herdmanston Steading				55°55′10″N 2°50′42″W	Category B	18892	Upload Photo
West Saltoun, Main Street, Coruisk				55°53′46″N 2°51′50″W	Category C(S)	18904	Upload Photo
Saltoun Parish Church, With Graveyard Walls And Railings, East Saltoun				55°54′04″N 2°50′31″W	Category A	18885	Upload another image See more images
Saltoun Hall, Walled Garden				55°54′33″N 2°52′12″W	Category B	18900	Upload Photo
Spilmersford Bridge				55°54′40″N 2°52′00″W	Category C(S)	18901	Upload another image See more images

== Key ==
The scheme for classifying buildings in Scotland is:

- Category A: "buildings of national or international importance, either architectural or historic; or fine, little-altered examples of some particular period, style or building type."
- Category B: "buildings of regional or more than local importance; or major examples of some particular period, style or building type, which may have been altered."
- Category C: "buildings of local importance; lesser examples of any period, style, or building type, as originally constructed or moderately altered; and simple traditional buildings which group well with other listed buildings."

In March 2016 there were 47,288 listed buildings in Scotland. Of these, 8% were Category A, and 50% were Category B, with the remaining 42% being Category C.

== See also ==
- List of listed buildings in East Lothian
