= List of listed buildings in Gladsmuir, East Lothian =

This is a list of listed buildings in the parish of Gladsmuir in East Lothian, Scotland.

== List ==
Name	Location	Date Listed	Grid Ref. (Note: Sometimes known as OSGB36, the grid reference (where provided) is based on the British national grid reference system used by the Ordnance Survey. • "Guide to National Grid". Ordnance Survey. • "Get-a-map". Ordnance Survey.)	Geo-coordinates	Notes	LB Number (Note: Historic Environment Scotland assign a unique alphanumeric identifier to each designated site in Scotland, for listed buildings this always begins with "LB", for example "LB12345".)	Image
Samuelston Bridge				55°55′45″N 2°49′00″W		13186	Upload another image
Samuelston West Mains Cottage				55°55′39″N 2°50′09″W	Category C(S)	13190	Upload Photo
Harelaw Cottages				55°58′53″N 2°52′28″W	Category C(S)	13152	Upload Photo
Harelaw Steading				55°58′46″N 2°52′53″W	Category B	13155	Upload Photo
3-6 Inclusive Nos Longniddry Farm Cottages				55°58′28″N 2°53′32″W	Category C(S)	13158	Upload Photo
Longniddry Farm Steading				55°58′25″N 2°53′33″W	Category B	13160	Upload Photo
Longniddry 3 And 4, 13 And 14 Kitchener Crescent				55°58′32″N 2°53′32″W	Category B	13165	Upload Photo
Longniddry 5 And 6, 11 And 12, 15 And 16, 17 And 18 Kitchener Crescent				55°58′34″N 2°53′28″W	Category B	13166	Upload Photo
Longniddry Lyars Road Woodburn				55°59′00″N 2°53′44″W	Category C(S)	13167	Upload Photo
Longniddry 11 Main Street Roselea				55°58′28″N 2°53′43″W	Category C(S)	13173	Upload Photo
Gladsmuir Dragonswell With Garden Building				55°57′00″N 2°52′07″W	Category B	12705	Upload Photo
Penston Farmhouse				55°56′25″N 2°53′31″W	Category C(S)	13180	Upload Photo
Setonhill With Dovecot Walled Garden And Gatepiers				55°58′29″N 2°51′58″W	Category B	13191	Upload Photo
Longniddry 1 And 2 Kitchener Crescent				55°58′31″N 2°53′33″W	Category B	13163	Upload Photo
Longniddry Mains, Cottages And Steading				55°58′23″N 2°53′51″W	Category C(S)	13168	Upload Photo
Longniddry, 25 Kings Road, West Court Including Garages And Entrance Forecourt				55°58′26″N 2°54′34″W	Category C(S)	51780	Upload Photo
Longniddry Main Street Grainfoot				55°58′28″N 2°53′44″W	Category C(S)	13175	Upload Photo
Longniddry School				55°58′36″N 2°53′33″W	Category B	13179	Upload Photo
Longniddry 7 And 8, 9 And 10 Kitchener Crescent				55°58′33″N 2°53′31″W	Category B	13164	Upload Photo
Longniddry 7 Main Street				55°58′28″N 2°53′40″W	Category C(S)	13170	Upload Photo
Chesterhall Farmhouse				55°57′44″N 2°54′46″W	Category B	12700	Upload Photo
Elvingston House With Stable Court				55°57′34″N 2°51′51″W	Category B	12702	Upload Photo
Elvingston House Dovecot				55°57′35″N 2°51′49″W	Category B	12703	Upload Photo
Gladsmuir Farmhouse With Steading				55°56′58″N 2°52′04″W	Category B	12706	Upload Photo
Gladsmuir Schoolhouse And Former School				55°56′58″N 2°52′14″W	Category C(S)	12710	Upload Photo
Redcoll Gate Lodge And Gatepiers				55°57′53″N 2°53′17″W	Category B	13183	Upload Photo
Redcoll Steading Nw Range With Dovecot				55°58′03″N 2°52′57″W	Category B	13184	Upload Photo
Samuelston East Mains Farmhouse				55°55′46″N 2°49′27″W	Category C(S)	13188	Upload Photo
Setonhill Cartshed And Granary				55°58′29″N 2°52′00″W	Category C(S)	13192	Upload Photo
Redcoll				55°58′00″N 2°53′05″W	Category B	13143	Upload Photo
Longniddry House With Outbuilding Garden Walls Wellhead And_Kirk Ruin				55°58′23″N 2°53′58″W	Category B	13162	Upload Photo
Elvingston House South Lodge Gatepiers And Quadrant Wall				55°57′03″N 2°51′35″W	Category C(S)	12704	Upload Photo
Gladsmuir Garage Cottage				55°56′57″N 2°52′12″W	Category C(S)	12707	Upload Photo
Gladsmuir Old Parish Church With Graveyard Walls				55°57′00″N 2°52′11″W	Category B	12708	Upload another image See more images
Greendykes Farmhouse				55°57′10″N 2°54′14″W	Category C(S)	12712	Upload Photo
Longniddry Main Street Longniddry Inn				55°58′29″N 2°53′39″W	Category C(S)	13176	Upload Photo
Redcoll Cottages				55°58′13″N 2°52′59″W	Category C(S)	13182	Upload Photo
Samuelston Mid Mains Cottage				55°55′43″N 2°49′45″W	Category C(S)	13189	Upload Photo
Trabroun Steading With Dovecot				55°57′32″N 2°51′27″W	Category B	13194	Upload Photo
Landridge Lime Kilns				55°58′09″N 2°52′16″W	Category C(S)	13156	Upload Photo
Longniddry Gosford Road Harmony				55°58′53″N 2°53′44″W	Category B	13161	Upload Photo
Longniddry 14 And 15 Main Street				55°58′29″N 2°53′35″W	Category C(S)	13174	Upload Photo
Gladsmuir Parish Church With Graveyard Gatepiers And Gates				55°56′58″N 2°52′10″W	Category B	12709	Upload another image See more images
Gosford Gateway West Lodge And Policy Walls				55°58′45″N 2°53′22″W	Category A	12711	Upload another image
Redcoll Carriage House				55°58′01″N 2°53′01″W	Category B	13181	Upload Photo
Southfield House With Gatepiers				55°57′49″N 2°53′32″W	Category B	13193	Upload Photo
Harelaw Lime Kilns				55°58′38″N 2°53′00″W	Category C(S)	13154	Upload Photo
Longniddry The Dean				55°58′24″N 2°54′39″W	Category B	13157	Upload Photo
Longniddry Farmhouse				55°58′24″N 2°53′35″W	Category B	13159	Upload Photo
Coates Cartshed And Granary				55°58′22″N 2°50′22″W	Category C(S)	12701	Upload Photo
Elvingston House East Lodge With Gatepiers				55°57′36″N 2°51′39″W	Category B	13838	Upload Photo
Longniddry 12 Old School Road				55°58′28″N 2°53′43″W	Category C(S)	13177	Upload Photo
Longniddry 8 Main Street				55°58′28″N 2°53′42″W	Category C(S)	13171	Upload Photo
Longniddry 9 And 10 Main Street				55°58′28″N 2°53′42″W	Category C(S)	13172	Upload Photo
Longniddry Old School Road Greydykes				55°58′29″N 2°53′45″W	Category C(S)	13178	Upload Photo
Redhouse Farmhouse With Retaining Wall				55°58′59″N 2°51′46″W	Category C(S)	13185	Upload Photo
Samuelston East Mains				55°55′44″N 2°49′33″W	Category C(S)	13187	Upload Photo
Greendykes Steading				55°57′14″N 2°54′12″W	Category B	13151	Upload Photo
Harelaw Farmhouse				55°58′47″N 2°52′52″W	Category B	13153	Upload Photo
Longniddry Main Street Reading Room				55°58′26″N 2°53′44″W	Category C(S)	13169	Upload another image

== Key ==
The scheme for classifying buildings in Scotland is:

- Category A: "buildings of national or international importance, either architectural or historic; or fine, little-altered examples of some particular period, style or building type."
- Category B: "buildings of regional or more than local importance; or major examples of some particular period, style or building type, which may have been altered."
- Category C: "buildings of local importance; lesser examples of any period, style, or building type, as originally constructed or moderately altered; and simple traditional buildings which group well with other listed buildings."

In March 2016 there were 47,288 listed buildings in Scotland. Of these, 8% were Category A, and 50% were Category B, with the remaining 42% being Category C.

== See also ==
- List of listed buildings in East Lothian
