= List of listed buildings in East Lothian =

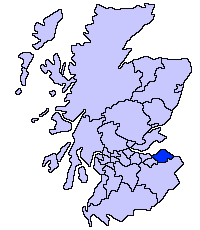
East Lothian shown within Scotland

This is a list of listed buildings in East Lothian. The list is split out by parish.

- List of listed buildings in Aberlady, East Lothian
- List of listed buildings in Athelstaneford, East Lothian
- List of listed buildings in Bolton, East Lothian
- List of listed buildings in Cockenzie And Port Seton, East Lothian
- List of listed buildings in Dirleton, East Lothian
- List of listed buildings in Dunbar, East Lothian
- List of listed buildings in East Linton, East Lothian
- List of listed buildings in Garvald And Bara, East Lothian
- List of listed buildings in Gladsmuir, East Lothian
- List of listed buildings in Haddington, East Lothian
- List of listed buildings in Humbie, East Lothian
- List of listed buildings in Innerwick, East Lothian
- List of listed buildings in Inveresk, East Lothian
- List of listed buildings in Morham, East Lothian
- List of listed buildings in Musselburgh, East Lothian
- List of listed buildings in North Berwick, East Lothian
- List of listed buildings in Oldhamstocks, East Lothian
- List of listed buildings in Ormiston, East Lothian
- List of listed buildings in Pencaitland, East Lothian
- List of listed buildings in Prestonkirk, East Lothian
- List of listed buildings in Prestonpans, East Lothian
- List of listed buildings in Saltoun, East Lothian
- List of listed buildings in Spott, East Lothian
- List of listed buildings in Stenton, East Lothian
- List of listed buildings in Tranent, East Lothian
- List of listed buildings in Whitekirk And Tyninghame, East Lothian
- List of listed buildings in Whittingehame, East Lothian
- List of listed buildings in Yester, East Lothian

== See also ==
- Scheduled monuments in East Lothian
