= List of listed buildings in Whittingehame, East Lothian =

This is a list of listed buildings in the parish of Whittingehame in East Lothian, Scotland.

== List ==
Name	Location	Date listed	Geo-coordinates	Notes	Category	LB number	Image
Ruchlaw House With Sundial, Walled Garden And Retaining Wall			55°57′31″N 2°36′46″W		B	17517	Upload Photo
Stoneypath Farm Cottages			55°55′58″N 2°37′08″W		B	17521	Upload Photo
Stoneypath Farmhouse With Gatepiers, Quadrant And Retaining Walls			55°55′55″N 2°36′56″W		B	17522	Upload Photo
Whittingehame East Bridge			55°57′55″N 2°37′21″W		B	17526	Upload Photo
Whittingehame House, West Lodge With Quadrants And Gatepiers			55°56′29″N 2°39′27″W		A	17490	Upload Photo
Eastfield, Farm Cottages			55°57′39″N 2°37′48″W		B	17505	Upload Photo
Luggate Burn, Smithy			55°57′37″N 2°38′31″W		B	17511	Upload Photo
Mayshiel Farmhouse And Bothy			55°52′08″N 2°36′10″W		B	17513	Upload Photo
Papple Steading, West And North Ranges And Stalk			55°56′37″N 2°39′24″W		B	17515	Upload Photo
Ruchlaw House, Stable Court			55°57′29″N 2°36′49″W		C(S)	17519	Upload Photo
Stoneypath Steading With Water Wheel			55°55′53″N 2°36′57″W		B	17523	Upload Photo
Whittingehame House, East Lodge With Piers			55°57′54″N 2°37′24″W		A	17486	Upload Photo
Whittingehame Tower, Pavilion Lodges And Gatepiers (E Lodge Known As Gardener's House)			55°57′10″N 2°38′24″W		A	17502	Upload Photo
Eastfield, Steading With Stalk			55°57′37″N 2°37′48″W		B	17507	Upload Photo
Luggate Burn, Post Office Cottage			55°57′33″N 2°38′28″W		B	17510	Upload Photo
Ruchlaw Mains Farmhouse, Gatepiers, Gates And Boundary Walls			55°57′43″N 2°37′03″W		C(S)	17520	Upload Photo
Whittingehame, East Garden Cottages With Boundary Walls			55°57′12″N 2°38′24″W		C(S)	17527	Upload Photo
Whittingehame House With Terrace Walls And Sundial			55°57′08″N 2°37′58″W		A	17485	Upload Photo
Whittingehame, Joiner's Cottage And Workshop			55°57′19″N 2°37′53″W		B	17491	Upload Photo
Eastfield, Farm Manager's House			55°57′37″N 2°37′48″W		B	17506	Upload Photo
Luggate Steading, Stalk And Cartsheds			55°57′48″N 2°38′56″W		B	17512	Upload Photo
Whittingehame House, Heather Lodge With Gatepiers, Quadrant And Boundary Walls			55°56′59″N 2°37′28″W		B	17487	Upload Photo
Whittingehame, Redcliff And Stables, With Whittingehame Estate Office And Gates And Piers			55°57′27″N 2°38′03″W		B	17498	Upload Photo
Johnscleugh House And Steading			55°53′23″N 2°35′27″W		B	17508	Upload Photo
Newmains Cartshed And Granary			55°56′03″N 2°37′33″W		B	17514	Upload Photo
Ruchlaw House, Dovecot			55°57′27″N 2°36′50″W		B	17518	Upload Photo
Whittingehame House, South Lodge			55°56′38″N 2°38′15″W		B	17489	Upload Photo
Whittingehame Parish Church With Graveyard Walls And Piers			55°57′16″N 2°38′14″W		B	17496	Upload Photo
Whittingehame Tower, (Formerly Whittingehame Castle) With Wellhead And Sundial			55°57′02″N 2°38′19″W		A	17500	Upload Photo
Luggate Burn, Old School House And Former School			55°57′36″N 2°38′30″W		B	17509	Upload Photo
Priestlaw Farmhouse			55°51′45″N 2°33′45″W		C(S)	17516	Upload Photo
Whitelaw Farmhouse With Retaining Walls			55°56′22″N 2°41′44″W		B	17524	Upload Photo
Whittingehame, Lime Tree Avenue Bridge			55°57′18″N 2°37′48″W		B	17493	Upload Photo
Whittingehame Tower, Tower Cottage			55°57′00″N 2°38′21″W		C(S)	17501	Upload Photo
Whittingehame Bridge			55°57′23″N 2°38′02″W		B	17525	Upload Photo
Whittingehame Filter Station With Boundary Walls And Piers			55°56′29″N 2°39′21″W		B	17484	Upload Photo
Whittingehame House, Main Lodge With Gatepier (Known As Stable Lodge)			55°57′17″N 2°37′57″W		B	17488	Upload Photo
Whittingehame, Lady Eleanor's Cottage With Boundary Walls And Railings			55°57′24″N 2°38′04″W		B	17492	Upload Photo
Whittingehame Mains Farmhouse			55°57′18″N 2°38′45″W		C(S)	17494	Upload Photo
Whittingehame Estate, Policy Walls And Gatepiers			55°56′54″N 2°38′29″W		B	17497	Upload Photo
Blaikie Heugh, Balfour Monument			55°56′52″N 2°40′52″W		B	17504	Upload Photo
Whittingehame Mains Steading With Stalk			55°57′19″N 2°38′57″W		B	17495	Upload Photo
Whittingehame House Stables With Quadrant Walls			55°57′14″N 2°37′56″W		B	17499	Upload Photo
Whittingehame Walled Garden, Summer Pavilion And Gifford Gates With Quadrant Walls And Gatepiers			55°57′10″N 2°38′16″W		B	17503	Upload Photo

== Key ==
The scheme for classifying buildings in Scotland is:

- Category A: "buildings of national or international importance, either architectural or historic; or fine, little-altered examples of some particular period, style or building type."
- Category B: "buildings of regional or more than local importance; or major examples of some particular period, style or building type, which may have been altered."
- Category C: "buildings of local importance; lesser examples of any period, style, or building type, as originally constructed or moderately altered; and simple traditional buildings which group well with other listed buildings."

In March 2016 there were 47,288 listed buildings in Scotland. Of these, 8% were Category A, and 50% were Category B, with the remaining 42% being Category C.

== See also ==
- List of listed buildings in East Lothian
