= List of listed buildings in Cockenzie And Port Seton, East Lothian =

This is a list of listed buildings in the parish of Cockenzie And Port Seton in East Lothian, Scotland.

== List ==
Name	Location	Date Listed	Grid Ref. (Note: Sometimes known as OSGB36, the grid reference (where provided) is based on the British national grid reference system used by the Ordnance Survey. • "Guide to National Grid". Ordnance Survey. • "Get-a-map". Ordnance Survey.)	Geo-coordinates	Notes	LB Number (Note: Historic Environment Scotland assign a unique alphanumeric identifier to each designated site in Scotland, for listed buildings this always begins with "LB", for example "LB12345".)	Image
126-128 (Even Nos) High Street, Port Seton House With Boundary Wall And Gatepiers				55°58′19″N 2°57′27″W	Category C(S)	23030	Upload Photo
1-13 (Inclusive Nos) Wemyss Place				55°58′18″N 2°57′21″W	Category B	23032	Upload Photo
1-29 (Inclusive Nos) Gosford Road With Boundary Walls				55°58′17″N 2°57′19″W	Category C(S)	23033	Upload Photo
Edinburgh Road, Anwoth Cottage And Boundary Wall				55°58′12″N 2°57′34″W	Category C(S)	43952	Upload Photo
Port Seton Harbour				55°58′22″N 2°57′18″W	Category B	43956	Upload another image See more images
Edinburgh Road, Chalmers Memorial Church, Church Of Scotland				55°58′13″N 2°57′27″W	Category A	23027	Upload another image See more images
1-15 (Inclusive Nos) Elcho Place				55°58′18″N 2°57′25″W	Category C(S)	23031	Upload Photo
High Street, Former Salt Store				55°58′13″N 2°57′51″W	Category C(S)	47923	Upload Photo
Cockenzie House, With Great Custom, Gates, Walls And Garden Features				55°58′13″N 2°57′48″W	Category A	23026	Upload another image See more images
44 High Street, Old Parish Church, Church Of Scotland				55°58′16″N 2°57′42″W	Category C(S)	23028	Upload another image
Manse Lane, Setonfield With Boundary Walls				55°58′17″N 2°57′30″W	Category C(S)	23029	Upload Photo
21 High Street, With 1 South Doors				55°58′14″N 2°57′45″W	Category C(S)	43954	Upload Photo
Cockenzie Harbour				55°58′14″N 2°58′00″W	Category B	23025	Upload another image See more images
Edinburgh Road, Methodist Chapel With Boundary Walls				55°58′08″N 2°57′52″W	Category C(S)	43953	Upload another image
17-19 (Odd Nos) Osbourne Court (Winton Park)				55°58′11″N 2°57′31″W	Category C(S)	43955	Upload Photo

== Key ==
The scheme for classifying buildings in Scotland is:

- Category A: "buildings of national or international importance, either architectural or historic; or fine, little-altered examples of some particular period, style or building type."
- Category B: "buildings of regional or more than local importance; or major examples of some particular period, style or building type, which may have been altered."
- Category C: "buildings of local importance; lesser examples of any period, style, or building type, as originally constructed or moderately altered; and simple traditional buildings which group well with other listed buildings."

In March 2016 there were 47,288 listed buildings in Scotland. Of these, 8% were Category A, and 50% were Category B, with the remaining 42% being Category C.

== See also ==
- List of listed buildings in East Lothian
