= List of listed buildings in Spott, East Lothian =

This is a list of listed buildings in the parish of Spott in East Lothian, Scotland.

== List ==
Name	Location	Date Listed	Grid Ref. (Note: Sometimes known as OSGB36, the grid reference (where provided) is based on the British national grid reference system used by the Ordnance Survey. • "Guide to National Grid". Ordnance Survey. • "Get-a-map". Ordnance Survey.)	Geo-coordinates	Notes	LB Number (Note: Historic Environment Scotland assign a unique alphanumeric identifier to each designated site in Scotland, for listed buildings this always begins with "LB", for example "LB12345".)	Image
Easter Broomhouse Cartshed And Granary				55°59′01″N 2°30′49″W	Category B	14759	Upload Photo
Spott Church With Session House, Graveyard Walls And Railings, (Church Of Scotland)				55°58′20″N 2°31′28″W	Category B	14762	Upload another image See more images
Spott House, Lodge With Gatepiers And Quadrants				55°58′19″N 2°31′22″W	Category C(S)	14787	Upload Photo
Bourhouse (Bower House) Dovecot				55°58′56″N 2°32′01″W	Category A	14757	Upload another image
Bower House (Bourhouse) Lodge With Gatepiers And Parapet				55°59′01″N 2°32′04″W	Category B	14758	Upload Photo
Halls Farm Cottages				55°56′49″N 2°33′30″W	Category C(S)	14761	Upload Photo
Spott House, Home Farm Cottages				55°58′07″N 2°30′52″W	Category B	14785	Upload Photo
Spott, Main Street, Ivybank				55°58′25″N 2°31′20″W	Category B	14790	Upload Photo
Halls Farmhouse With Retaining Walls And Gatepiers				55°56′48″N 2°33′23″W	Category A	14760	Upload Photo
Spott Dovecot				55°58′20″N 2°31′20″W	Category A	14763	Upload another image
Spott House, Kennels With Railings				55°58′01″N 2°31′04″W	Category C(S)	14786	Upload Photo
Spott, Main Street, Rosebank And Cottage				55°58′24″N 2°31′21″W	Category B	14789	Upload Photo
Spott House With Boundary Walls, Piers, "Chapel" And Game Larder				55°58′09″N 2°30′56″W	Category B	14784	Upload Photo
Spott House, Stable Court And Groom's House				55°58′08″N 2°30′54″W	Category B	14788	Upload Photo
Bower House (Bourhouse) With Gates, Wellhead, Terrace And Boundary Walls				55°58′52″N 2°32′10″W	Category A	14756	Upload Photo
Spott, High Road, Turner's House (Formerly 1 Main Street)				55°58′13″N 2°31′40″W	Category C(S)	14791	Upload Photo
Spott, Main Street, Schoolhouse Community Centre				55°58′17″N 2°31′32″W	Category C(S)	14792	Upload Photo
The Standards				55°58′55″N 2°32′17″W	Category C(S)	14793	Upload Photo
Wester Broomhouse, Wellhead Tower				55°58′38″N 2°31′44″W	Category C(S)	14794	Upload Photo

== Key ==
The scheme for classifying buildings in Scotland is:

- Category A: "buildings of national or international importance, either architectural or historic; or fine, little-altered examples of some particular period, style or building type."
- Category B: "buildings of regional or more than local importance; or major examples of some particular period, style or building type, which may have been altered."
- Category C: "buildings of local importance; lesser examples of any period, style, or building type, as originally constructed or moderately altered; and simple traditional buildings which group well with other listed buildings."

In March 2016 there were 47,288 listed buildings in Scotland. Of these, 8% were Category A, and 50% were Category B, with the remaining 42% being Category C.

== See also ==
- List of listed buildings in East Lothian
