= List of listed buildings in Garvald And Bara, East Lothian =

This is a list of listed buildings in the parish of Garvald, East Lothian And Bara, East Lothian, East Lothian, Scotland.

== List ==
| Name | Location | Date Listed | Grid Ref. (Note: Sometimes known as OSGB36, the grid reference (where provided) is based on the British national grid reference system used by the Ordnance Survey. • "Guide to National Grid". Ordnance Survey. • "Get-a-map". Ordnance Survey.) | Geo-coordinates | Notes | LB Number (Note: Historic Environment Scotland assign a unique alphanumeric identifier to each designated site in Scotland, for listed buildings this always begins with "LB", for example "LB12345".) | Image |
|---|---|---|---|---|---|---|---|
| Castle Moffat, Steading | | | | 55°54′59″N 2°38′18″W | Category B | 7328 | Upload Photo |
| Garvald, Main Street, Garvald Hotel | | | | 55°55′43″N 2°39′41″W | Category B | 7333 | Upload Photo |
| Garvald, Main Street, Mulberry And Glen Cottages | | | | 55°55′42″N 2°39′43″W | Category C(S) | 7335 | Upload Photo |
| Garvald, Main Street, Rowans And Retaining Walls And Gatepiers | | | | 55°55′42″N 2°39′49″W | Category B | 7336 | Upload Photo |
| Garvald, Manse And Stables | | | | 55°55′46″N 2°39′27″W | Category B | 7340 | Upload Photo |
| Newlands Farmhouse | | | | 55°53′21″N 2°41′20″W | Category B | 7319 | Upload Photo |
| West Hopes Farmhouse | | | | 55°51′22″N 2°42′31″W | Category C(S) | 7325 | Upload Photo |
| Castlemains Farmhouse | | | | 55°53′17″N 2°42′43″W | Category C(S) | 7326 | Upload Photo |
| Danskine, East Lodge (Formerly To Yester House) | | | | 55°53′50″N 2°41′43″W | Category C(S) | 13403 | Upload Photo |
| Garvald, Main Street, Logansland And Retaining Wall | | | | 55°55′43″N 2°39′38″W | Category B | 7334 | Upload Photo |
| Garvald, Main Street, Village Hall (Former Free Church) With Retaining Walls | | | | 55°55′43″N 2°39′47″W | Category C(S) | 7338 | Upload Photo |
| Castle Moffat, Cottages | | | | 55°54′58″N 2°38′16″W | Category B | 7327 | Upload Photo |
| Garvald, Main Street, Brookside And Juniper Cottage | | | | 55°55′44″N 2°39′30″W | Category C(S) | 7331 | Upload Photo |
| Garvald, Main Street, Tree Tops | | | | 55°55′44″N 2°39′31″W | Category B | 7337 | Upload Photo |
| East Hopes Steading | | | | 55°51′54″N 2°42′24″W | Category B | 7343 | Upload Photo |
| Linplum (Limplum) House | | | | 55°55′29″N 2°42′51″W | Category B | 7344 | Upload Photo |
| Garvald, Main Street, Broomfield | | | | 55°55′43″N 2°39′45″W | Category C(S) | 7332 | Upload Photo |
| Garvald Parish Church (Church Of Scotland) | | | | 55°55′46″N 2°39′24″W | Category B | 7341 | Upload Photo |
| Hopes House With Gates And Gatepiers | | | | 55°51′57″N 2°42′10″W | Category A | 7342 | Upload another image |
| Tanderlane Cottage | | | | 55°55′54″N 2°40′15″W | Category C(S) | 7324 | Upload Photo |
| Linplum Lodge | | | | 55°55′26″N 2°43′01″W | Category B | 7318 | Upload Photo |
| Snawdon Cartshed And Granary | | | | 55°54′04″N 2°40′02″W | Category B | 7323 | Upload Photo |
| Danskine Gateway | | | | 55°53′51″N 2°41′44″W | Category A | 7329 | Upload Photo |
| Garvald, Main Street, Ashley Cottage | | | | 55°55′44″N 2°39′29″W | Category B | 7330 | Upload Photo |
| Garvald, Main Street, Whitelaws With Retaining Walls | | | | 55°55′44″N 2°39′33″W | Category B | 7339 | Upload Photo |
| Nunraw Dovecot | | | | 55°55′39″N 2°38′46″W | Category A | 7320 | Upload another image |
| Nunraw Old Abbey With Sundial | | | | 55°55′35″N 2°38′43″W | Category A | 7321 | Upload another image |
| Baro House With Boundary Walls, Gates And Gatepiers | | | | 55°55′06″N 2°41′55″W | Category B | 7346 | Upload Photo |
| Nunraw Old Abbey, North Lodge And Gate | | | | 55°55′36″N 2°39′21″W | Category B | 7322 | Upload Photo |
| Baro Farmhouse With Garden Walls | | | | 55°55′13″N 2°42′18″W | Category B | 7345 | Upload Photo |

== Key ==
The scheme for classifying buildings in Scotland is:

- Category A: "buildings of national or international importance, either architectural or historic; or fine, little-altered examples of some particular period, style or building type."
- Category B: "buildings of regional or more than local importance; or major examples of some particular period, style or building type, which may have been altered."
- Category C: "buildings of local importance; lesser examples of any period, style, or building type, as originally constructed or moderately altered; and simple traditional buildings which group well with other listed buildings."

In March 2016 there were 47,288 listed buildings in Scotland. Of these, 8% were Category A, and 50% were Category B, with the remaining 42% being Category C.

== See also ==
- List of listed buildings in East Lothian
