= List of listed buildings in North Berwick, East Lothian =

This is a list of listed buildings in the parish of North Berwick in East Lothian, Scotland.

== List ==
Name	Location	Date Listed	Grid Ref. (Note: Sometimes known as OSGB36, the grid reference (where provided) is based on the British national grid reference system used by the Ordnance Survey. • "Guide to National Grid". Ordnance Survey. • "Get-a-map". Ordnance Survey.)	Geo-coordinates	Notes	LB Number (Note: Historic Environment Scotland assign a unique alphanumeric identifier to each designated site in Scotland, for listed buildings this always begins with "LB", for example "LB12345".)	Image
Abbots Croft With Gates And Lodge				56°03′19″N 2°42′08″W	Category C(S)	38705	Upload Photo
2 East Road (The Lodge) And 4 East Road (The Wall Tower), Dovecot And Boundary Walls				56°03′27″N 2°43′02″W	Category B	38717	Upload Photo
Grange Road, The Grange Studio And Lych-Gate				56°03′12″N 2°43′27″W	Category B	38725	Upload Photo
53-57 (Odd Nos) High Street				56°03′30″N 2°43′10″W	Category B	38736	Upload another image
4-6 (Even Nos) High Street				56°03′31″N 2°43′03″W	Category C(S)	38742	Upload another image
30 Marmion Road				56°03′25″N 2°43′31″W	Category B	38757	Upload Photo
3 Melbourne Road, (Sands Cottage) With Boundary Wall				56°03′36″N 2°43′01″W	Category C(S)	38759	Upload another image
1-9 (Inclusive Nos) The Quadrant With Parapet Walls				56°03′29″N 2°42′48″W	Category C(S)	38764	Upload Photo
Redside Farm Cottages				56°01′50″N 2°41′01″W	Category B	14750	Upload Photo
Sheriff Hall Farm Cottages				56°01′38″N 2°42′07″W	Category B	14754	Upload Photo
Balgone House, South Pavilion, (Originally Mirrored Pair To North Pavilion)				56°01′55″N 2°41′50″W	Category C(S)	14718	Upload Photo
Sheriff Hall Steading With Horsemill And Stalk				56°01′38″N 2°42′11″W	Category B	14719	Upload Photo
Sheriff Hall Westgate				56°01′33″N 2°42′28″W	Category B	14720	Upload Photo
Tantallon Castle				56°03′23″N 2°39′02″W	Category A	14722	Upload another image
Heugh Farm Dovecot				56°02′55″N 2°42′14″W	Category B	14744	Upload Photo
Heugh Farm, North Berwick Drinking Water Tank				56°02′59″N 2°42′07″W	Category B	14745	Upload Photo
14 Westgate, Blenheim House Hotel With Boundary Walls				56°03′30″N 2°43′26″W	Category B	38789	Upload another image
Windygates Road Oldfields, 2 Glenorchy Road				56°03′17″N 2°43′46″W	Category B	38791	Upload Photo
Windygates Road, Windygates, With Glass House, Walled Garden, Quadrants				56°03′16″N 2°43′46″W	Category B	38792	Upload Photo
Windygates Road, Marly Knowe With Walls And Terrace				56°03′11″N 2°43′48″W	Category B	38793	Upload Photo
12 York Road, St Ann`S With Garden Walls And Statuary				56°03′35″N 2°43′59″W	Category C(S)	38796	Upload Photo
28 Dirleton Avenue, Glenconner With Boundary Walls And Gatepiers				56°03′29″N 2°44′17″W	Category B	38714	Upload Photo
59-71 And 75-81 (Odd Nos) High Street				56°03′29″N 2°43′13″W	Category C(S)	38737	Upload another image
Law Road, Roman Catholic Presbytery				56°03′20″N 2°43′09″W	Category C(S)	38751	Upload another image
3, 5 And 7 Melbourne Place				56°03′34″N 2°43′01″W	Category C(S)	38758	Upload another image
14 And 15 Melbourne Road (Formerly Known As Coastguard Cottages) With Lifeboat House				56°03′32″N 2°42′53″W	Category C(S)	38760	Upload another image
Nungate Road, Abbey Farm, Dovecot				56°03′19″N 2°43′35″W	Category B	38761	Upload Photo
7-14 (Inclusive Nos) Rhodes Farm Cottages With Boundary Walls				56°03′25″N 2°41′38″W	Category B	38769	Upload Photo
School Road, Museum And Library				56°03′31″N 2°42′53″W	Category C(S)	38772	Upload another image
5 And 7 Victoria Road				56°03′35″N 2°43′04″W	Category C(S)	38775	Upload another image
31-33 (Odd Nos) Westgate				56°03′29″N 2°43′32″W	Category B	38784	Upload Photo
Leuchie Stables				56°02′27″N 2°41′10″W	Category C(S)	14749	Upload another image
Bonnington Farmhouse				56°02′36″N 2°42′30″W	Category B	14740	Upload Photo
45-49 (Odd Nos) Westgate				56°03′28″N 2°43′35″W	Category B	38786	Upload Photo
10-12 (Even Nos) Westgate With Retaining Walls				56°03′30″N 2°43′25″W	Category B	38788	Upload another image
38 Dirleton Avenue, Ormesdene And Summer House And Boundary Wall				56°03′25″N 2°44′30″W	Category B	38716	Upload Photo
27 East Road And 1 Balfour Street				56°03′29″N 2°42′52″W	Category B	38719	Upload Photo
18 Fidra Road, Hyndford, Terrace And Boundary Walls				56°03′31″N 2°44′15″W	Category B	38721	Upload Photo
23-25 (Odd Nos) High Street				56°03′31″N 2°43′11″W	Category C(S)	38733	Upload Photo
45-47 (Odd Nos) High Street				56°03′30″N 2°43′08″W	Category B	38734	Upload another image
St Andrews Street And High Street, St Andrew Blackadder Parish Church And Hall (Church Of Scotland)				56°03′29″N 2°43′14″W	Category C(S)	38738	Upload Photo
84-86 (Even Nos) High Street				56°03′31″N 2°43′14″W	Category C(S)	38748	Upload Photo
2, 4 And 4A Victoria Road With 1 Melbourne Place				56°03′34″N 2°43′02″W	Category C(S)	38774	Upload another image
Redside Farmhouse				56°01′58″N 2°41′00″W	Category B	14751	Upload Photo
Balgone, North Lodge With Entrance Arch				56°02′09″N 2°41′25″W	Category B	14737	Upload Photo
Blackdykes Steading With Cartshed And Horsemill				56°02′40″N 2°40′26″W	Category B	14739	Upload Photo
Bonnington Steading				56°02′36″N 2°42′30″W	Category B	14741	Upload Photo
35-37 (Odd Nos) Westgate With Retaining Wall				56°03′28″N 2°43′32″W	Category C(S)	38785	Upload another image
Clifford Road, King's Knoll				56°03′22″N 2°43′25″W	Category B	38706	Upload Photo
22 Dirleton Avenue, Baltrenon With Boundary Walls				56°03′29″N 2°44′10″W	Category C(S)	38712	Upload Photo
Grange Road, The Grange, Garden Walls And Gateway				56°03′13″N 2°43′28″W	Category A	38723	Upload Photo
Grange Road, Power House Cottage				56°03′10″N 2°43′29″W	Category B	38727	Upload Photo
Harbour				56°03′40″N 2°43′07″W	Category B	38730	Upload another image
49-51 (Odd Nos) High Street				56°03′30″N 2°43′09″W	Category C(S)	38735	Upload another image
107 High Street				56°03′28″N 2°43′19″W	Category C(S)	38740	Upload Photo
8-12 (Even Nos) High Street				56°03′32″N 2°43′03″W	Category C(S)	38743	Upload another image
50-54 (Even Nos) High Street				56°03′31″N 2°43′09″W	Category B	38745	Upload another image
Law Road, Old Parish Church, Graveyard Walls And Monuments				56°03′28″N 2°43′07″W	Category B	38749	Upload another image
4 Law Road, Glebe House With Gatepiers And Quadrants				56°03′26″N 2°43′14″W	Category B	38753	Upload another image
2-4 (Inc Nos) Nungate Road, (Known As The Nungate) With Boundary Wall And Gateway				56°03′22″N 2°43′41″W	Category B	38762	Upload Photo
Quality Street, War Memorial				56°03′30″N 2°43′01″W	Category B	38766	Upload another image
Rhodes Farmhouse With Gatepiers And Boundary Walls				56°03′21″N 2°41′46″W	Category B	38770	Upload Photo
29 Westgate, Well Cottage				56°03′29″N 2°43′31″W	Category B	38783	Upload another image
Sydserf House				56°01′34″N 2°44′15″W	Category A	14721	Upload another image
Fenton Tower				56°01′46″N 2°44′04″W	Category A	14743	Upload another image See more images
Leuchie House, Richard Cave Multiple Sclerosis Holiday Home And La Sagesse Convent				56°02′26″N 2°41′18″W	Category A	14746	Upload another image See more images
16 Westgate, Normanhurst				56°03′30″N 2°43′28″W	Category C(S)	38790	Upload another image
Windygates Road, Coach House, Marly Knowe				56°03′12″N 2°43′46″W	Category C(S)	38794	Upload Photo
7 And 9 Dirleton Avenue				56°03′29″N 2°43′52″W	Category C(S)	38708	Upload Photo
23, 25 East Road				56°03′29″N 2°42′52″W	Category C(S)	38718	Upload Photo
15 Glenorchy Road. Glenorchy, With Boundary Walls And Gateways				56°03′16″N 2°43′49″W	Category B	38722	Upload Photo
125-127 (Odd Nos) High Street				56°03′28″N 2°43′21″W	Category C(S)	38741	Upload another image
66 High Street, Victoria House				56°03′31″N 2°43′11″W	Category B	38747	Upload another image
11 And 11A Marmion Road				56°03′25″N 2°43′23″W	Category C(S)	38754	Upload Photo
2 Quality Street, (The Beehive)				56°03′30″N 2°43′00″W	Category B	38767	Upload another image
10-12 (Even Nos) Quality Street, Dalrymple Arms Hotel				56°03′32″N 2°43′01″W	Category C(S)	38768	Upload another image
27 Westgate				56°03′29″N 2°43′31″W	Category C(S)	38782	Upload another image
Redside Steading With Cartshed And Former Engine House				56°01′58″N 2°40′54″W	Category B	14752	Upload Photo
Sheriff Hall Farmhouse				56°01′37″N 2°42′08″W	Category B	14755	Upload Photo
12 York Road, Minaki				56°03′35″N 2°43′55″W	Category B	50212	Upload Photo
4 Westgate, Post Office With Gateway				56°03′30″N 2°43′22″W	Category B	38787	Upload another image
Dirleton Avenue, St Baldred's Episcopal Church With Retaining Wall And Gatepiers				56°03′30″N 2°43′51″W	Category B	38711	Upload Photo
36 Dirleton Avenue, Thurston Lodge				56°03′26″N 2°44′24″W	Category B	38715	Upload Photo
Grange Road, The Grange Summer House				56°03′11″N 2°43′31″W	Category B	38726	Upload Photo
3 Greenheads Road, The Coach House, Lower Coach House And The Loft (Former Known As The Cottage) And Boundary Wall				56°03′21″N 2°42′33″W	Category C(S)	38729	Upload Photo
15-17 (Odd Nos) High Street, County Hotel				56°03′31″N 2°43′04″W	Category C(S)	38732	Upload another image
14 And 16 High Street				56°03′31″N 2°43′04″W	Category C(S)	38744	Upload Photo
31 Marmion Road And 26 Clifford Road				56°03′23″N 2°43′32″W	Category B	38755	Upload Photo
15-17 (Odd Nos) Quality Street				56°03′31″N 2°43′03″W	Category B	38765	Upload another image
Victoria Road, East Lothian Yacht Club				56°03′40″N 2°43′05″W	Category B	38779	Upload Photo
20 West Bay Road, Point Garry Hotel With Retaining Wall				56°03′34″N 2°43′46″W	Category C(S)	38781	Upload Photo
Rockville Farm Dovecot				56°01′38″N 2°43′16″W	Category B	14753	Upload Photo
Balgone House				56°01′56″N 2°41′48″W	Category A	14716	Upload Photo
Tantallon Castle Dovecot				56°03′22″N 2°39′05″W	Category A	14723	Upload Photo
Bass Rock, Lighthouse				56°04′36″N 2°38′28″W	Category C(S)	14738	Upload another image See more images
Castleton Farmhouse				56°03′21″N 2°39′29″W	Category B	14742	Upload Photo
Leuchie Gate Lodge, With Entrance Gates				56°02′24″N 2°41′37″W	Category C(S)	14747	Upload another image
24 Dirleton Avenue, The White House With Garden And Boundary Walls				56°03′28″N 2°44′13″W	Category B	38713	Upload Photo
33 Fidra Road				56°03′25″N 2°44′27″W	Category C(S)	38720	Upload Photo
Grange Road, The Grange Lodge, Stables And Walls				56°03′11″N 2°43′25″W	Category B	38724	Upload Photo
56-60 (Even Nos) High Street				56°03′31″N 2°43′09″W	Category C(S)	38746	Upload another image
54 St Baldreds Road, Edington Cottage Hospital				56°03′20″N 2°43′06″W	Category B	38771	Upload another image
Victoria Road, Blackadder Church With Retaining Walls And Gatepiers (Church Of Scotland				56°03′34″N 2°43′04″W	Category B	38773	Upload another image
9 Victoria Road				56°03′36″N 2°43′04″W	Category C(S)	38776	Upload another image
10 And 110A West Bay Road, Cranston With Boundary Walls				56°03′32″N 2°43′43″W	Category B	38780	Upload Photo
Balgone Barns, Old Windmill				56°02′09″N 2°43′08″W	Category B	14715	Upload Photo
Balgone House, Coach House, (North Pavilion, Originally Mirrored Pair To South Pavilion)				56°01′56″N 2°41′52″W	Category B	14717	Upload Photo
Windygates Road Cottage, Marly Knowe, Also Known As Marly Lodge				56°03′12″N 2°43′47″W	Category B	38795	Upload Photo
Cromwell Road, Marine Hotel				56°03′34″N 2°44′19″W	Category B	38707	Upload Photo
11 And 13 Dirleton Avenue				56°03′29″N 2°43′54″W	Category C(S)	38709	Upload Photo
67 Dirleton Avenue, Cheylesmore Lodge, Gatepiers And Walls				56°03′20″N 2°44′21″W	Category B	38710	Upload Photo
1-10 (Consecutive Nos) Redholm, Greenheads Road, (Formerly Redholm) Including Gatepiers, Terrace And Boundary Walls				56°03′20″N 2°42′19″W	Category B	38728	Upload Photo
1 High Street, Council Chambers				56°03′31″N 2°43′02″W	Category B	38731	Upload another image
91-93 (Odd Nos) High Street				56°03′29″N 2°43′17″W	Category C(S)	38739	Upload another image
Law Road, Our Lady Star Of The Sea, (Roman Catholic Church) With Gateway				56°03′21″N 2°43′09″W	Category B	38750	Upload another image
2 Law Road				56°03′30″N 2°43′10″W	Category C(S)	38752	Upload another image
28 Marmion Road, Norham With Gatepiers And Parapet Walls				56°03′25″N 2°43′30″W	Category A	38756	Upload Photo
Old Abbey Road, The Abbey And Boundary Walls With Gateway				56°03′20″N 2°43′48″W	Category B	38763	Upload Photo
11 Victoria Road				56°03′36″N 2°43′04″W	Category C(S)	38777	Upload another image
Victoria Road Old Parish Church Porch				56°03′38″N 2°43′04″W	Category B	38778	Upload Photo
Leuchie South Lodge With Curtain Wall And Gatepiers				56°02′10″N 2°41′23″W	Category C(S)	14748	Upload another image

== Key ==
The scheme for classifying buildings in Scotland is:

- Category A: "buildings of national or international importance, either architectural or historic; or fine, little-altered examples of some particular period, style or building type."
- Category B: "buildings of regional or more than local importance; or major examples of some particular period, style or building type, which may have been altered."
- Category C: "buildings of local importance; lesser examples of any period, style, or building type, as originally constructed or moderately altered; and simple traditional buildings which group well with other listed buildings."

In March 2016 there were 47,288 listed buildings in Scotland. Of these, 8% were Category A, and 50% were Category B, with the remaining 42% being Category C.

== See also ==
- List of listed buildings in East Lothian
