= List of listed buildings in East Linton, East Lothian =

This is a list of listed buildings in the parish of East Linton in East Lothian, Scotland.

== List ==
Name	Location	Date listed	Geo-coordinates	Notes	Category	LB number	Image
3-7 (Odd Nos) Bridge Street			55°59′07″N 2°39′23″W		B	26637	Upload another image
19 and 21 Bridge Street			55°59′09″N 2°39′23″W		B	26639	Upload Photo
25 Bridge Street, The Crown Hotel			55°59′10″N 2°39′22″W		B	26641	Upload another image
4 Browns Place, with Retaining Wall			55°59′20″N 2°39′32″W		C(S)	26645	Upload Photo
45 High Street			55°59′15″N 2°39′25″W		C(S)	26666	Upload another image
2 High Street			55°59′11″N 2°39′21″W		C(S)	26672	Upload another image
32 High Street			55°59′14″N 2°39′22″W		C(S)	26675	Upload another image
1 Lauder Place			55°59′04″N 2°39′14″W		B	26679	Upload Photo
1 Preston Road			55°59′21″N 2°39′30″W		B	26683	Upload another image
5 Bridge End			55°59′08″N 2°39′17″W		B	26634	Upload another image
23 Bridge Street			55°59′09″N 2°39′22″W		B	26640	Upload another image
3 High Street			55°59′11″N 2°39′22″W		C(S)	26656	Upload another image
15 High Street			55°59′12″N 2°39′22″W		B	26659	Upload another image
21 and 23 High Street			55°59′12″N 2°39′23″W		C(S)	26661	Upload another image
40 and 42 High Street			55°59′17″N 2°39′23″W		C(S)	26676	Upload Photo
44 and 46 High Street			55°59′16″N 2°39′24″W		C(S)	26677	Upload another image
9 Brown's Place			55°59′22″N 2°39′35″W		B	26649	Upload Photo
11-13 (Inclusive Nos) Brown's Place			55°59′22″N 2°39′36″W		C(S)	26651	Upload Photo
7 and 9 High Street			55°59′11″N 2°39′22″W		B	26657	Upload another image
47 and 49 High Street			55°59′16″N 2°39′25″W		B	26667	Upload another image
65 High Street			55°59′11″N 2°39′27″W		B	26668	Upload another image
71 High Street			55°59′18″N 2°39′28″W		C(S)	26671	Upload another image
Bank Road, The Royal Bank Of Scotland			55°59′10″N 2°39′26″W		B	26631	Upload another image
Bridge End, Old Bridge			55°59′07″N 2°39′16″W		A	26632	Upload another image
1 Bridge Street			55°59′07″N 2°39′23″W		B	26636	Upload another image
16 and 17 Brown's Place			55°59′23″N 2°39′39″W		C(S)	26652	Upload another image
69 High Street			55°59′17″N 2°39′28″W		B	26670	Upload another image
8 High Street, Old Bankhouse			55°59′12″N 2°39′20″W		B	26674	Upload another image
2 Preston Road			55°59′21″N 2°39′29″W		B	26684	Upload Photo
5-12 (Inclusive Nos) School Road			55°59′15″N 2°39′30″W		B	26686	Upload another image
10-14 (Even Nos) Bridge Street			55°59′09″N 2°39′21″W		C(S)	26644	Upload another image
6 and 7 Brown's Place, with Retaining Wall and Railings			55°59′20″N 2°39′33″W		C(S)	26647	Upload another image
8 Brown's Place, Old North Manse			55°59′21″N 2°39′34″W		B	26648	Upload Photo
18-21 (Inclusive Nos) Brown's Place			55°59′23″N 2°39′40″W		C(S)	26653	Upload another image
29 High Street			55°59′13″N 2°39′23″W		C(S)	26664	Upload another image
4 and 6 High Street			55°59′12″N 2°39′21″W		C(S)	26673	Upload another image
2 and 3 The Square			55°59′10″N 2°39′21″W		C(S)	26687	Upload another image
7 The Square, Manor House			55°59′11″N 2°39′20″W		B	26689	Upload another image
The Square, St Andrews's Church, Church Of Scotland			55°59′09″N 2°39′19″W		B	26690	Upload another image
4 Bridge End, Old Bakehouse			55°59′08″N 2°39′18″W		C(S)	26635	Upload another image
5 Browns Place, with Retaining Wall			55°59′20″N 2°39′32″W		B	26646	Upload another image
23 Brown's Place			55°59′24″N 2°39′42″W		B	26654	Upload another image
Station Road, Manseford			55°59′05″N 2°39′22″W		C(S)	26693	Upload Photo
Station Road, Station House			55°59′06″N 2°39′24″W		B	26694	Upload another image
2 Bridge Street Old Police Station			55°59′08″N 2°39′21″W		B	26642	Upload another image
6 Bridge Street, Lynton Cottage			55°59′08″N 2°39′21″W		C(S)	26643	Upload another image
10 Brown's Place			55°59′22″N 2°39′36″W		B	26650	Upload another image
11 and 13 High Street			55°59′12″N 2°39′22″W		B	26658	Upload another image
17 and 19 High Street			55°59′12″N 2°39′22″W		B	26660	Upload another image
High Street, Telephone Kiosk			55°59′12″N 2°39′22″W		B	26662	Upload another image
43 High Street			55°59′15″N 2°39′24″W		B	26665	Upload another image
High Street, Prestonkirk House			55°59′19″N 2°39′26″W		B	26678	Upload another image
6 Mill Wynd			55°59′09″N 2°39′18″W		B	26682	Upload another image
The Square Fountain			55°59′10″N 2°39′21″W		B	26691	Upload another image
Haddington Road, Old Auction Mart Sale Hall			55°59′08″N 2°39′35″W		B	48089	Upload another image
1 Bridge End			55°59′07″N 2°39′19″W		B	26633	Upload another image
9 and 11 Bridge Street			55°59′08″N 2°39′23″W		C(S)	26638	Upload another image
1 High Street			55°59′10″N 2°39′22″W		C(S)	26655	Upload another image
25 High Street			56°00′17″N 2°39′24″W		C(S)	26663	Upload another image
67 High Street			55°59′17″N 2°39′28″W		C(S)	26669	Upload Photo
3 Mill Wynd			55°59′11″N 2°39′17″W		B	26680	Upload another image
5 Mill Wynd			55°59′10″N 2°39′18″W		C(S)	26681	Upload Photo
5 Preston Road			55°59′23″N 2°39′27″W		B	26685	Upload another image
4 The Square			55°59′10″N 2°39′20″W		B	26688	Upload another image
Station Road, Harvesters Hotel			55°59′03″N 2°39′25″W		B	26692	Upload another image

== Key ==
The scheme for classifying buildings in Scotland is:

- Category A: "buildings of national or international importance, either architectural or historic; or fine, little-altered examples of some particular period, style or building type."
- Category B: "buildings of regional or more than local importance; or major examples of some particular period, style or building type, which may have been altered."
- Category C: "buildings of local importance; lesser examples of any period, style, or building type, as originally constructed or moderately altered; and simple traditional buildings which group well with other listed buildings."

In March 2016 there were 47,288 listed buildings in Scotland. Of these, 8% were Category A, and 50% were Category B, with the remaining 42% being Category C.

== See also ==
- List of listed buildings in East Lothian
