= List of listed buildings in Prestonkirk, East Lothian =

This is a list of listed buildings in the parish of Prestonkirk in East Lothian, Scotland.

== List ==
Name	Location	Date Listed	Grid Ref. (Note: Sometimes known as OSGB36, the grid reference (where provided) is based on the British national grid reference system used by the Ordnance Survey. • "Guide to National Grid". Ordnance Survey. • "Get-a-map". Ordnance Survey.)	Geo-coordinates	Notes	LB Number (Note: Historic Environment Scotland assign a unique alphanumeric identifier to each designated site in Scotland, for listed buildings this always begins with "LB", for example "LB12345".)	Image
Phantassie Limekiln				55°58′59″N 2°38′23″W	Category B	14504	Upload another image
Crauchie Farm Steading				55°59′49″N 2°42′06″W	Category B	14511	Upload Photo
Hailes Smithy				55°58′23″N 2°40′51″W	Category C(S)	14518	Upload Photo
Scotscraig				55°58′58″N 2°39′18″W	Category B	14520	Upload Photo
Houston Mill				55°59′26″N 2°39′13″W	Category B	18965	Upload Photo
Cauldside Cottage With Ingleneuk				56°00′09″N 2°39′20″W	Category B	18188	Upload Photo
Phantassie Cottages				55°59′06″N 2°39′12″W	Category B	14500	Upload Photo
Phantassie Dovecot				55°59′16″N 2°38′52″W	Category A	14501	Upload another image See more images
Drylawhill Farm				55°59′36″N 2°39′52″W	Category B	14515	Upload Photo
Markle Mains Farm Steading				55°59′15″N 2°42′07″W	Category B	14498	Upload Photo
Phantassie Farm Steading				55°59′10″N 2°38′54″W	Category B	14502	Upload another image See more images
Preston Mains Farmhouse				55°59′42″N 2°38′44″W	Category B	14505	Upload Photo
Crauchie Farm Cottages				55°59′46″N 2°42′14″W	Category B	14512	Upload Photo
Traprain Farmhouse With Garden Walls And Gatepiers				55°58′22″N 2°39′22″W	Category C(S)	14527	Upload Photo
Crauchie Farmhouse With Retaining Wall And Gatepiers				55°59′48″N 2°42′06″W	Category B	14513	Upload Photo
Sunnyside Cottages				55°58′17″N 2°39′18″W	Category B	14524	Upload Photo
Waughton Dovecot				56°01′05″N 2°41′46″W	Category B	14529	Upload another image
Phantassie House				55°59′11″N 2°38′45″W	Category A	14503	Upload Photo
Beanston House				55°58′38″N 2°43′29″W	Category B	14506	Upload Photo
Hailes Castle				55°58′24″N 2°41′00″W	Category A	14516	Upload Photo
Smeaton-Hepburn Gate Lodge				55°59′31″N 2°39′14″W	Category B	14522	Upload Photo
Smeaton-Hepburn Farm Steading East Range				56°00′00″N 2°39′09″W	Category B	14523	Upload Photo
Sunnyside Farm Steading And Stalk				55°58′13″N 2°39′05″W	Category B	14526	Upload Photo
Prestonkirk Parish Church (Church Of Scotland)				55°59′29″N 2°39′17″W	Category A	14530	Upload Photo
Beanston Orangery				55°58′38″N 2°43′24″W	Category B	14507	Upload Photo
Beanston Steading And Stalk				55°58′39″N 2°43′42″W	Category B	14508	Upload Photo
Smeaton-Hepburn Garden Walls And Sundials				55°59′54″N 2°39′07″W	Category B	14521	Upload Photo
Traprain Steading And Stalk				55°58′24″N 2°39′17″W	Category C(S)	14528	Upload Photo
Preston Mill				55°59′32″N 2°39′04″W	Category A	14531	Upload another image See more images
Brownrigg Farmhouse				56°01′03″N 2°43′05″W	Category B	14510	Upload Photo
Drylawhill Dovecot				55°59′36″N 2°39′56″W	Category B	14514	Upload another image
Hailes Cottage				55°58′21″N 2°40′55″W	Category C(S)	14517	Upload Photo
Sandy's Mill				55°58′07″N 2°43′20″W	Category A	14519	Upload another image
Markle Mains Farmhouse With Retaining Walls, Gatepiers And Wrought-Iron Gates				55°59′17″N 2°42′02″W	Category B	14497	Upload Photo
Overhailes Farmhouse				55°58′40″N 2°41′15″W	Category B	14499	Upload Photo
Beanston Walled Garden				55°58′40″N 2°43′22″W	Category C(S)	14509	Upload Photo
Sunnyside Farmhouse				55°58′14″N 2°39′04″W	Category B	14525	Upload Photo

== Key ==
The scheme for classifying buildings in Scotland is:

- Category A: "buildings of national or international importance, either architectural or historic; or fine, little-altered examples of some particular period, style or building type."
- Category B: "buildings of regional or more than local importance; or major examples of some particular period, style or building type, which may have been altered."
- Category C: "buildings of local importance; lesser examples of any period, style, or building type, as originally constructed or moderately altered; and simple traditional buildings which group well with other listed buildings."

In March 2016 there were 47,288 listed buildings in Scotland. Of these, 8% were Category A, and 50% were Category B, with the remaining 42% being Category C.

== See also ==
- List of listed buildings in East Lothian
