= List of listed buildings in Bolton, East Lothian =

This is a list of listed buildings in the parish of Bolton in East Lothian, Scotland.

== List ==
Name	Location	Date Listed	Grid Ref. (Note: Sometimes known as OSGB36, the grid reference (where provided) is based on the British national grid reference system used by the Ordnance Survey. • "Guide to National Grid". Ordnance Survey. • "Get-a-map". Ordnance Survey.)	Geo-coordinates	Notes	LB Number (Note: Historic Environment Scotland assign a unique alphanumeric identifier to each designated site in Scotland, for listed buildings this always begins with "LB", for example "LB12345".)	Image
Bolton Parish Church With Stuart Mausoleum, Hearse House, Graveyard Walls And Gates				55°55′17″N 2°47′23″W	Category B	6389	Upload Photo
Pilmuir Old Manse				55°54′44″N 2°49′25″W	Category B	6400	Upload Photo
The Old Schoolhouse And School With Retaining Walls				55°55′15″N 2°47′24″W	Category C(S)	6401	Upload Photo
Eaglescairnie House With Walled Garden, Hot-House And Bridge				55°54′57″N 2°46′25″W	Category B	6395	Upload Photo
Eaglescairnie House, Stable Range				55°54′55″N 2°46′21″W	Category B	6396	Upload Photo
Bolton Old Manse With Stables, Railing And Retaining Walls				55°55′17″N 2°47′22″W	Category B	6388	Upload Photo
Pilmuir House With Walled Garden, Retaining Walls, Gatepiers And Dovecot				55°54′51″N 2°49′22″W	Category A	6398	Upload Photo
Bolton, Under Bolton Farm Dovecot				55°55′16″N 2°47′26″W	Category B	6402	Upload Photo
Pilmuir Lodge				55°54′54″N 2°49′23″W	Category C(S)	6399	Upload Photo
Bolton War Memorial And Drinking Fountain				55°55′16″N 2°47′25″W	Category B	6390	Upload Photo
Eaglescairnie Lodge, Piers And Retaining Walls				55°54′48″N 2°47′05″W	Category B	6397	Upload Photo
Bolton Muir With Entrance Court, Retaining And Terrace Walls				55°54′11″N 2°46′37″W	Category A	1417	Upload Photo
Colstoun, Front Lodge With Gatepiers And Quadrants				55°55′57″N 2°46′46″W	Category B	6393	Upload Photo
Eaglescairne Home Farm				55°54′47″N 2°46′21″W	Category B	6394	Upload Photo
Upper Bolton Farmhouse With Retaining Walls				55°54′46″N 2°47′39″W	Category B	6403	Upload Photo

== Key ==
The scheme for classifying buildings in Scotland is:

- Category A: "buildings of national or international importance, either architectural or historic; or fine, little-altered examples of some particular period, style or building type."
- Category B: "buildings of regional or more than local importance; or major examples of some particular period, style or building type, which may have been altered."
- Category C: "buildings of local importance; lesser examples of any period, style, or building type, as originally constructed or moderately altered; and simple traditional buildings which group well with other listed buildings."

In March 2016 there were 47,288 listed buildings in Scotland. Of these, 8% were Category A, and 50% were Category B, with the remaining 42% being Category C.

== See also ==
- List of listed buildings in East Lothian
