= List of listed buildings in Tranent, East Lothian =

This is a list of listed buildings in the parish of Tranent in East Lothian, Scotland.

== List ==
Name	Location	Date Listed	Grid Ref. (Note: Sometimes known as OSGB36, the grid reference (where provided) is based on the British national grid reference system used by the Ordnance Survey. • "Guide to National Grid". Ordnance Survey. • "Get-a-map". Ordnance Survey.)	Geo-coordinates	Notes	LB Number (Note: Historic Environment Scotland assign a unique alphanumeric identifier to each designated site in Scotland, for listed buildings this always begins with "LB", for example "LB12345".)	Image
1-3 (Odd Numbers) Bridge Street, And 2 Church Street, Keepers Arms				55°56′41″N 2°57′15″W	Category C(S)	42078	Upload Photo
121 Church Street				55°56′50″N 2°57′19″W	Category C(S)	42083	Upload Photo
110 Church Street With Retaining Walls				55°56′49″N 2°57′20″W	Category B	42088	Upload Photo
Edinburgh Road Bankpark House, With Lodge, Carriage House, Greenhouses, Garden Walls, Gatepiers And Gates				55°56′48″N 2°57′50″W	Category B	42092	Upload Photo
Edinburgh Road, 1-9 (Inclusive) Viewforth Terrace With Retaining Walls				55°56′44″N 2°57′36″W	Category B	42093	Upload Photo
10 Fowler Street				55°56′52″N 2°57′20″W	Category B	42095	Upload Photo
St Germains House				55°57′44″N 2°55′12″W	Category B	19075	Upload another image
Bankton House (Colonel Gardiner's House) With Retaining Walls				55°57′09″N 2°58′13″W	Category B	17546	Upload another image See more images
Bankton House, Colonel Gardiner's Monument				55°57′13″N 2°58′15″W	Category B	17547	Upload another image See more images
5 Bridge Street				55°56′41″N 2°57′16″W	Category C(S)	42079	Upload Photo
205 Church Street, Seton Lodge With Retaining Walls, Railings And Gateways				55°56′57″N 2°57′21″W	Category B	42084	Upload another image
71 High Street				55°56′37″N 2°57′07″W	Category C(S)	42097	Upload Photo
Sanderson's Wynd, Tranent Infant School With Gates And Gatepiers, Retaining Walls And Shelters				55°56′46″N 2°57′13″W	Category B	42099	Upload another image
Elphinstone Tower With Gatepiers And Garden Walls				55°55′08″N 2°58′39″W	Category B	19069	Upload Photo
St Germains Coach House				55°57′44″N 2°55′14″W	Category B	19072	Upload another image
Seton Collegiate Church, St Mary And Holy Cross, With Retaining Walls And Carved Panels				55°57′56″N 2°56′01″W	Category A	19077	Upload Photo
Seton West Mains Farmhouse With Garden Walls				55°57′42″N 2°57′09″W	Category C(S)	19082	Upload Photo
12 Church Street				55°56′43″N 2°57′16″W	Category C(S)	42087	Upload Photo
244 Church Street, The Manse Stables With Retaining Walls And Gatepiers				55°56′58″N 2°57′24″W	Category B	42089	Upload Photo
Seton Castle (Seton House), With Retaining Terrace And Walls				55°57′55″N 2°56′06″W	Category A	19080	Upload another image See more images
8-10 (Even Numbers) Church Street				55°56′42″N 2°57′16″W	Category C(S)	42086	Upload Photo
High Street, Tranent War Memorial And Railings				55°56′41″N 2°57′13″W	Category B	42098	Upload another image See more images
Tranent Parish Church (Church Of Scotland) With Graveyard Walls, Gatepiers, Gates And Gravestones				55°56′59″N 2°57′29″W	Category B	42100	Upload another image See more images
Fa'side Castle (or Falside Castle), With Outbuilding And Retaining Walls				55°55′40″N 2°59′51″W	Category B	19070	Upload another image See more images
St Joseph's School With Gates And Gatepiers				55°57′17″N 2°57′12″W	Category B	19076	Upload Photo
Tranent Mains Farmhouse				55°57′04″N 2°56′54″W	Category C(S)	19083	Upload Photo
Elphinstone, Main Street, War Memorial				55°55′19″N 2°58′06″W	Category C(S)	17551	Upload another image
St Germains, East Lodge With Outbuilding, Quadrant And Gatepiers				55°57′52″N 2°55′22″W	Category C(S)	49601	Upload Photo
246 Church Street, With Balustrades And Retaining Walls				55°56′59″N 2°57′24″W	Category B	42090	Upload Photo
252 Church Street				55°57′00″N 2°57′23″W	Category B	42091	Upload Photo
Seton Farmhouse With Retaining Walls				55°57′51″N 2°56′28″W	Category C(S)	19078	Upload Photo
Dovecot Brae, Tranent Dovecot				55°57′00″N 2°57′29″W	Category B	17549	Upload another image
Elphinstone, Main Street, Chapel				55°55′16″N 2°58′14″W	Category C(S)	17550	Upload another image
23 Bridge Street, Royal Bank Of Scotland				55°56′41″N 2°57′18″W	Category B	42080	Upload Photo
Church Street, House By Parish Church Hall				55°56′49″N 2°57′17″W	Category B	42081	Upload Photo
High Street, East Lothian Co-Operative Society Ltd				55°56′41″N 2°57′14″W	Category C(S)	42096	Upload Photo
St Germains Cottage				55°57′43″N 2°55′13″W	Category C(S)	19073	Upload Photo
Bankton House Garden House/Dovecot				55°57′08″N 2°58′15″W	Category C(S)	17548	Upload another image
Church Street, Parish Church Hall (Formerly Wishart Church) With Gates, Railings, Gatepiers And Retaining Walls				55°56′49″N 2°57′16″W	Category B	42082	Upload Photo
4-6 (Even Numbers) Church Street				55°56′42″N 2°57′16″W	Category C(S)	42085	Upload Photo
7 Edinburgh Road With Gates And Gatepiers				55°56′45″N 2°57′40″W	Category C(S)	42094	Upload Photo
St Clements Wells Dovecot				55°55′52″N 3°00′13″W	Category B	19071	Upload another image
St Germains Dovecot				55°57′39″N 2°55′14″W	Category B	19074	Upload another image
Seton Gardens With Retaining Walls And Gatepiers				55°57′49″N 2°56′00″W	Category C(S)	19079	Upload Photo
Seton Mill Kiln And Granary				55°58′02″N 2°56′10″W	Category C(S)	19081	Upload another image See more images

== Key ==
The scheme for classifying buildings in Scotland is:

- Category A: "buildings of national or international importance, either architectural or historic; or fine, little-altered examples of some particular period, style or building type."
- Category B: "buildings of regional or more than local importance; or major examples of some particular period, style or building type, which may have been altered."
- Category C: "buildings of local importance; lesser examples of any period, style, or building type, as originally constructed or moderately altered; and simple traditional buildings which group well with other listed buildings."

In March 2016 there were 47,288 listed buildings in Scotland. Of these, 8% were Category A, and 50% were Category B, with the remaining 42% being Category C.

== See also ==
- List of listed buildings in East Lothian
