= List of listed buildings in Morham, East Lothian =

This is a list of listed buildings in the parish of Morham in East Lothian, Scotland.

== List ==
| Name | Location | Date Listed | Grid Ref. (Note: Sometimes known as OSGB36, the grid reference (where provided) is based on the British national grid reference system used by the Ordnance Survey. • "Guide to National Grid". Ordnance Survey. • "Get-a-map". Ordnance Survey.) | Geo-coordinates | Notes | LB Number (Note: Historic Environment Scotland assign a unique alphanumeric identifier to each designated site in Scotland, for listed buildings this always begins with "LB", for example "LB12345".) | Image |
|---|---|---|---|---|---|---|---|
| Mainshill Farm Cottages | | | | 55°56′27″N 2°42′13″W | Category B | 18863 | Upload Photo |
| Morham Loanhead | | | | 55°56′14″N 2°43′01″W | Category C(S) | 18865 | Upload Photo |
| The Old Manse | | | | 55°56′37″N 2°42′45″W | Category B | 18868 | Upload Photo |
| Morham Mains Farmhouse With Retaining Walls | | | | 55°56′08″N 2°42′49″W | Category B | 18867 | Upload Photo |
| Renton Hall Cottage | | | | 55°56′20″N 2°43′51″W | Category C(S) | 18872 | Upload Photo |
| West Morham Farmhouse | | | | 55°56′02″N 2°44′06″W | Category B | 18875 | Upload Photo |
| Beech Hill Lodge And Gatepiers | | | | 55°55′34″N 2°44′10″W | Category B | 18862 | Upload Photo |
| Morham Bank Farmhouse With Walled Garden, Terrace Wall And Piers | | | | 55°55′31″N 2°43′41″W | Category B | 18864 | Upload Photo |
| Morham Mains Cottages | | | | 55°56′12″N 2°43′00″W | Category B | 18866 | Upload Photo |
| Morham Mill Bridge | | | | 55°56′23″N 2°42′31″W | Category B | 18869 | Upload Photo |
| Standingstone Farmhouse With Piers And Retaining Walls | | | | 55°57′13″N 2°40′45″W | Category C(S) | 18874 | Upload Photo |
| Renton Hall With Walled Garden And Gatepiers | | | | 55°56′16″N 2°43′52″W | Category B | 18871 | Upload Photo |
| Standing Stone Farm Cottages With Retaining Walls | | | | 55°57′13″N 2°40′46″W | Category C(S) | 18873 | Upload Photo |
| Morham Parish Church With Graveyard Walls | | | | 55°56′40″N 2°42′41″W | Category A | 18870 | Upload another image |

== Key ==
The scheme for classifying buildings in Scotland is:

- Category A: "buildings of national or international importance, either architectural or historic; or fine, little-altered examples of some particular period, style or building type."
- Category B: "buildings of regional or more than local importance; or major examples of some particular period, style or building type, which may have been altered."
- Category C: "buildings of local importance; lesser examples of any period, style, or building type, as originally constructed or moderately altered; and simple traditional buildings which group well with other listed buildings."

In March 2016 there were 47,288 listed buildings in Scotland. Of these, 8% were Category A, and 50% were Category B, with the remaining 42% being Category C.

== See also ==
- List of listed buildings in East Lothian
