= List of listed buildings in Dirleton, East Lothian =

This is a list of listed buildings in the parish of Dirleton, in East Lothian, Scotland.

== List ==
Name	Location	Date Listed	Grid Ref. (Note: Sometimes known as OSGB36, the grid reference (where provided) is based on the British national grid reference system used by the Ordnance Survey. • "Guide to National Grid". Ordnance Survey. • "Get-a-map". Ordnance Survey.)	Geo-coordinates	Notes	LB Number (Note: Historic Environment Scotland assign a unique alphanumeric identifier to each designated site in Scotland, for listed buildings this always begins with "LB", for example "LB12345".)	Image
Congalton Dovecote				56°00′41″N 2°44′15″W	Category B	4837	Upload another image
1-4 (Inclusive Nos) Congalton Cottages				56°01′12″N 2°44′13″W	Category B	1522	Upload Photo
Dirleton Village, 1-12 (Inclusive Nos) Fidra Avenue				56°02′51″N 2°46′35″W	Category B	1529	Upload Photo
Dirleton Village, Main Road, 3, 4, 5, 6 And 7 Castle Mains Cottages				56°02′50″N 2°46′42″W	Category B	1531	Upload Photo
Dirleton Village, Main Road, Oatfield				56°02′57″N 2°46′46″W	Category B	1535	Upload Photo
Gullane, 29 And 31, 33 And 35, 37 And 39, 32 And 34, 36 And 38, 40 And 42, Hopetoun Terrace				56°02′13″N 2°49′51″W	Category B	1359	Upload Photo
Gullane, Nisbet Road, Seaforth				56°02′11″N 2°50′12″W	Category B	1367	Upload Photo
Gullane, Sandy Loan, The Glebe				56°02′12″N 2°50′11″W	Category B	1372	Upload Photo
Dirleton Village, Main Road, Woodside, Rockery Cottage, And Fidra Cottage				56°02′50″N 2°46′40″W	Category B	1373	Upload Photo
Queenston Bank Steading And Cartshed				56°02′15″N 2°47′44″W	Category B	1384	Upload Photo
Gullane, East Links Road, Belmore				56°01′59″N 2°49′45″W	Category B	1386	Upload Photo
Dirleton Village, Manse Road, Castle Inn				56°02′44″N 2°46′55″W	Category C(S)	1339	Upload Photo
Dirleton Village, Manse Road, Dirleton, Church Hall				56°02′53″N 2°47′01″W	Category B	1340	Upload Photo
Dirleton Village, Manse Road, Dirleton House, (Former Manse), Including Coach-House And Retaining Walls				56°02′53″N 2°46′54″W	Category B	1341	Upload Photo
Dirleton Village, Manse Road, The Red House				56°02′44″N 2°46′56″W	Category B	1343	Upload Photo
Fenton Barns Farmhouse With Gatepiers And Quadrant Walls				56°01′30″N 2°46′48″W	Category B	1353	Upload Photo
Gullane, Hill Road Corner House, East Corner House, Garage And Boundary Wall				56°02′08″N 2°50′39″W	Category B	1357	Upload Photo
Dirleton Village, Main Road, Easter Slap				56°02′41″N 2°46′56″W	Category B	1532	Upload Photo
Gullane, Main Street, Templar Lodge				56°02′05″N 2°50′01″W	Category B	1364	Upload Photo
North Berwick, Abbotsford Road, Westerdunes With Summer House, Garden Screen, Garden Sculpture, Terrace And Boundary Walls, Gates And Gatepiers				56°03′26″N 2°45′17″W	Category A	1380	Upload Photo
North Berwick, Williamstone Steading				56°03′10″N 2°44′27″W	Category B	1383	Upload Photo
Kingston Stables				56°01′51″N 2°44′29″W	Category C(S)	1396	Upload Photo
Newhouse Farmhouse				56°02′42″N 2°44′41″W	Category B	1398	Upload Photo
Rockville, South Lodge With Retaining Walls. (Formerly Balgone South Lodge)				56°00′59″N 2°43′28″W	Category B	1401	Upload Photo
3-6 And 7-10 (Inclusive Nos) West Fenton Cottages				56°01′36″N 2°48′09″W	Category B	1403	Upload Photo
Gullane, Duncur Road, Greywalls With Lodges, Garden Walls, Gateway And Gatepiers				56°02′32″N 2°49′10″W	Category A	1337	Upload another image
Dirleton Village, Manse Road, Auburn, Walled Garden And Retaining Wall				56°02′53″N 2°46′59″W	Category B	1338	Upload Photo
Dirleton Village, Manse Road, Swiss Cottage				56°02′45″N 2°46′56″W	Category B	1344	Upload Photo
Dirleton Village, Manse Road, War Memorial				56°02′51″N 2°46′59″W	Category C(S)	1345	Upload Photo
Eldbottle Wood, Marine Villa				56°03′49″N 2°48′00″W	Category B	1347	Upload Photo
14 Fenton Barns Cottages				56°01′33″N 2°46′51″W	Category C(S)	1352	Upload Photo
Dirleton Road, Invereil House				56°03′26″N 2°45′47″W		4838	Upload Photo
Archerfield, Home Farm				56°02′38″N 2°48′21″W	Category B	1521	Upload Photo
Gullane, Saltcoats Road, Saltcoats Castle Dovecot				56°01′39″N 2°49′40″W	Category C(S)	1369	Upload Photo
Gullane, Sandy Loan, St Adrians Episcopal Church				56°02′08″N 2°50′11″W	Category B	1371	Upload Photo
North Berwick, Abbotsford Road, Carlekemp With Boundary Walls				56°03′36″N 2°44′43″W	Category A	1375	Upload another image
North Berwick, Abbotsford Road, Teviotdale, (Formerly Grey Home)				56°03′29″N 2°44′51″W	Category B	1379	Upload Photo
Fidra Lighthouse With Houses And Walls				56°04′24″N 2°47′06″W	Category C(S)	1336	Upload another image
10, 11 And 12 Fenton Barns Cottages				56°01′34″N 2°46′51″W	Category B	1351	Upload Photo
Dirleton Village Dirleton Castle, Dovecot, Castle Gate, Tower And North And West Gateways And Boundary Walls				56°02′48″N 2°46′40″W	Category A	1525	Upload another image
Dirleton Village Main Road, Boonslie				56°02′42″N 2°46′53″W	Category B	1530	Upload Photo
Gullane, Main Street, Muirfield Lodge				56°02′18″N 2°49′13″W	Category B	1362	Upload Photo
Gullane, Nisbet Road, Chartwell, With Garage And Gatepiers				56°02′08″N 2°50′14″W	Category B	1366	Upload Photo
North Berwick, Abbotsford Road, Bunkerhill Lodge, With Gates And Gatepiers				56°03′27″N 2°45′02″W	Category B	1374	Upload Photo
North Berwick, Williamstone Farmhouse				56°03′09″N 2°44′26″W	Category B	1382	Upload Photo
Gullane, Duncur Road, Muirfield Gate And Gatehouse/Garage (Formerly Known As The Pleasance)				56°02′30″N 2°49′17″W	Category A	1385	Upload Photo
Gullane, Erskine Road, Solsgirth				56°02′20″N 2°49′51″W	Category B	1387	Upload Photo
Kingston Steading With Engine House And Stalk				56°01′56″N 2°44′52″W	Category B	1397	Upload Photo
1 And 2, 3 And 4, Fenton Barns Cottages				56°01′34″N 2°46′57″W	Category C(S)	1349	Upload Photo
5 And 6, 7 And 8, And 9 Fenton Barns Cottages				56°01′34″N 2°46′55″W	Category C(S)	1350	Upload Photo
Fenton Barns, Fenbar Garage				56°01′46″N 2°46′58″W	Category B	1354	Upload Photo
Fenton Barns, Model Farm				56°01′49″N 2°46′57″W	Category B	1355	Upload Photo
4-9 (Inclusive Nos) Ferrygate Cottages				56°03′05″N 2°45′58″W	Category C(S)	1356	Upload Photo
Archerfield, West Lodge				56°02′29″N 2°48′24″W	Category C(S)	1519	Upload Photo
Dirleton Village, Main Road, Holly Bank				56°02′43″N 2°46′53″W	Category C(S)	1533	Upload Photo
Archerfield, East Lodge				56°02′48″N 2°46′58″W	Category B	1537	Upload Photo
Dirleton Village, Main Road, Rose Cottage				56°02′49″N 2°46′49″W	Category C(S)	1498	Upload Photo
Dirleton Village, Main Road, Dirleton Village School, With Boundary Walls And Gateway				56°02′37″N 2°47′06″W	Category B	1499	Upload Photo
Gullane, Hummel Road, The Manse Boundary Wall				56°02′06″N 2°50′21″W	Category B	1360	Upload Photo
Gullane, Main Street, Golf Inn Hotel And Former Stable				56°02′07″N 2°49′52″W	Category B	1361	Upload Photo
Gullane, Saltcoats Road Saltcoats Castle, Vaulted Chamber And Boundary Walls				56°01′37″N 2°49′38″W	Category B	1368	Upload Photo
North Berwick, Abbotsford Road, Carlekemp Stables And Gatepiers				56°03′33″N 2°44′40″W	Category B	1378	Upload Photo
Gullane, Sandy Loan, Purvesholm				56°02′14″N 2°50′16″W	Category B	1390	Upload Photo
Highfield Farmhouse				56°02′15″N 2°44′02″W	Category C(S)	1394	Upload Photo
New Mains North And West Ranges With Engine House And Stalk				56°01′23″N 2°47′32″W	Category B	1399	Upload Photo
East Fenton, Farm House				56°01′25″N 2°46′14″W	Category B	1346	Upload Photo
Gullane, Hill Road, Whatton Lodge				56°02′10″N 2°50′32″W	Category B	1358	Upload Photo
7 Archerfield Estate				56°02′41″N 2°48′13″W	Category B	1520	Upload Photo
Dirleton Village, Church Session House (Former Gate House) And Former Mortuary				56°02′53″N 2°47′02″W	Category B	1527	Upload Photo
Dirleton Village, Dirleton Road, Cedar Grove				56°02′54″N 2°46′25″W	Category C(S)	1528	Upload Photo
Dirleton Village, Main Road, Ivy Bank				56°02′41″N 2°46′55″W	Category B	1534	Upload Photo
Dirleton Village, Main Road, Vine Cottage				56°02′50″N 2°46′40″W	Category B	1500	Upload Photo
Gullane, Main Street, Parish Church Hall				56°02′06″N 2°49′50″W	Category A	1363	Upload Photo
North Berwick, Abbotsford Road, Carlekemp Lodge With Gates And Gatepiers				56°03′31″N 2°44′43″W	Category A	1376	Upload Photo
North Berwick, Abbotsford Road, Carlekemp Engine Cottage				56°03′32″N 2°44′52″W	Category B	1377	Upload Photo
1 And 2, 11 And 12 West Fenton Cottages With Retaining Wall				56°01′36″N 2°48′07″W	Category B	1402	Upload Photo
West Fenton Farmhouse				56°01′35″N 2°48′22″W	Category B	1404	Upload Photo
Archerfield With Pavilion Wings				56°02′50″N 2°47′43″W	Category A	1536	Upload another image
Gullane, Main Street, The Smithy				56°02′04″N 2°49′57″W	Category B	1365	Upload another image
Gullane, Hill Road, Whim Lodge And The Bents				56°02′13″N 2°50′15″W	Category C(S)	1388	Upload Photo
Gullane, Whim Road, Seton Court				56°01′59″N 2°50′33″W	Category B	1391	Upload Photo
Gullane, Whim Road, Whiteholm				56°02′00″N 2°50′30″W	Category B	1393	Upload Photo
Kingston Farmhouse With Walled Garden And Summer House				56°01′49″N 2°44′32″W	Category B	1395	Upload Photo
North Berwick, Abbotsford Road, Bunkerhill (Bunkershill) And Boundary Walls				56°03′27″N 2°45′07″W	Category A	1400	Upload Photo
West Fenton Steading And Stalk				56°01′36″N 2°48′24″W	Category B	1405	Upload Photo
Ferrygate Farmhouse With Gatepiers, Boundary Walls, East And West Steading Ranges				56°03′03″N 2°45′45″W	Category B	1335	Upload Photo
Dirleton Village, Manse Road, The Old Manse				56°02′46″N 2°46′56″W	Category B	1342	Upload Photo
Eldbottle Wood, Marine Villa Cottage				56°03′48″N 2°48′04″W	Category C(S)	1348	Upload Photo
Dirleton Road, Invereil Coach-House				56°03′23″N 2°45′41″W	Category C(S)	1523	Upload Photo
Dirleton Road Invereil Lodge, Quadrant Walls And Gatepiers				56°03′10″N 2°45′42″W	Category C(S)	1524	Upload Photo
Dirleton Village, Dirleton Parish Church, Gateway And Graveyard Walls				56°02′54″N 2°47′02″W	Category A	1526	Upload another image
Gullane, Saltcoats Road, Saltcoats Market Garden House				56°01′38″N 2°49′40″W	Category B	1370	Upload Photo
North Berwick, 1 And 2 Williamstone Cottages				56°03′11″N 2°44′26″W	Category C(S)	1381	Upload Photo
Hill Road, Tern Cottage, (Formerly Coldstones Cottage) Including Terrace, Gateways And Boundary Walls				56°02′09″N 2°50′36″W	Category B	1389	Upload Photo
Gullane, Whim Road, The Whim				56°02′03″N 2°50′39″W	Category C(S)	1392	Upload Photo

== Key ==
The scheme for classifying buildings in Scotland is:

- Category A: "buildings of national or international importance, either architectural or historic; or fine, little-altered examples of some particular period, style or building type."
- Category B: "buildings of regional or more than local importance; or major examples of some particular period, style or building type, which may have been altered."
- Category C: "buildings of local importance; lesser examples of any period, style, or building type, as originally constructed or moderately altered; and simple traditional buildings which group well with other listed buildings."

In March 2016 there were 47,288 listed buildings in Scotland. Of these, 8% were Category A, and 50% were Category B, with the remaining 42% being Category C.

== See also ==
- List of listed buildings in East Lothian
