= List of listed buildings in Whitekirk and Tyninghame, East Lothian =

This is a list of listed buildings in the parish of Whitekirk And Tyninghame in East Lothian, Scotland.

== List ==
Name	Location	Date Listed	Grid Ref. (Note: Sometimes known as OSGB36, the grid reference (where provided) is based on the British national grid reference system used by the Ordnance Survey. • "Guide to National Grid". Ordnance Survey. • "Get-a-map". Ordnance Survey.)	Geo-coordinates	Notes	LB Number (Note: Historic Environment Scotland assign a unique alphanumeric identifier to each designated site in Scotland, for listed buildings this always begins with "LB", for example "LB12345".)	Image
Lawhead Farmhouse				56°00′20″N 2°38′34″W	Category C(S)	14573	Upload Photo
Newbyth, East Lodge, With Quadrant Walls And Gatepiers				56°00′28″N 2°39′03″W	Category B	14576	Upload Photo
Tyninghame House With Garden Ornament And Gateway				56°00′35″N 2°36′48″W	Category A	14586	Upload Photo
Tyninghame, Main Street Old Ale And Porter House				56°00′11″N 2°37′40″W	Category C(S)	14592	Upload Photo
Tyninghame, Main Street, Post Office, Smithy And Smithy Cottage				56°00′12″N 2°37′39″W	Category B	14594	Upload Photo
Tyninghame Sawmill				56°00′07″N 2°37′30″W	Category B	14599	Upload Photo
Tyninghame House, South Lodge And Gateway				56°00′09″N 2°37′28″W	Category C(S)	14606	Upload Photo
Tyninghame, Main Street Cottage				56°00′10″N 2°37′38″W	Category C(S)	14612	Upload Photo
Whitekirk, Lady's Field, (Formerly Whitekirk Manse) With Retaining Walls And Gatepiers				56°01′28″N 2°38′58″W	Category B	14613	Upload Photo
Whitekirk Mains Farmhouse Including Boundary Walls				56°01′28″N 2°39′03″W	Category B	14614	Upload Photo
Newbyth Old Mansion Gatepiers				56°00′31″N 2°41′16″W	Category C(S)	14578	Upload Photo
New Mains Farmhouse				56°02′10″N 2°38′17″W	Category B	14580	Upload Photo
Seacliffe (Seacliff) House				56°03′00″N 2°37′51″W	Category C(S)	14582	Upload Photo
Tyninghame Bridge				55°59′54″N 2°37′19″W	Category B	14583	Upload Photo
Tyninghame Dam Bridge				56°00′07″N 2°37′28″W	Category C(S)	14584	Upload Photo
Tyninghame, Main Street, The Old School House				56°00′13″N 2°37′42″W	Category C(S)	14593	Upload Photo
Tyninghame Factors House With Sundial And Retaining Walls				56°00′13″N 2°37′31″W	Category B	18190	Upload Photo
1-3 And 4-6 (Inclusive Nos) Lochhouses Farm Cottages				56°01′36″N 2°37′37″W	Category C(S)	14574	Upload Photo
Newbyth Old Mansion				56°00′41″N 2°39′51″W	Category A	14577	Upload Photo
Seacliffe (Seacliff) Cottage				56°03′01″N 2°37′47″W	Category C(S)	14581	Upload Photo
Tyninghame House, Haddington Obelisk				56°00′35″N 2°37′10″W	Category B	14605	Upload Photo
Tyninghame House Walled Garden With Gardener's Cottage, Gateways, Garden Ornament And Conservatory				56°00′30″N 2°37′08″W	Category B	14609	Upload Photo
Whitekirk Parish Church, St Mary's (Church Of Scotland)				56°01′30″N 2°38′58″W	Category A	14615	Upload Photo
Tyninghame House, Clock Tower Court				56°00′36″N 2°36′47″W	Category B	14587	Upload Photo
Tyninghame, Main Street, Loch's Farmhouse And Green Corner				56°00′08″N 2°37′43″W	Category C(S)	14591	Upload Photo
Tyninghame, St Baldred's Cottage				56°00′23″N 2°37′40″W	Category B	14598	Upload Photo
Tyninghame House, Gardener's Cottage				56°00′26″N 2°36′59″W	Category C(S)	18191	Upload Photo
Lochhouses Farmhouse				56°01′40″N 2°37′24″W	Category B	14575	Upload Photo
Newbyth Stables				56°00′41″N 2°39′32″W	Category B	14579	Upload Photo
Tyninghame, Main Street, Teviot Cottage And Pear Tree Cottage				56°00′12″N 2°37′39″W	Category B	14595	Upload Photo
Tyninghame, Main Street, 1-5 (Inclusive Nos) Widows Row				56°00′10″N 2°37′44″W	Category C(S)	14597	Upload Photo
Tyninghame Links Steading And Grieve's House				56°01′11″N 2°36′10″W	Category B	14610	Upload Photo
Auldhame Farmhouse				56°02′59″N 2°39′01″W	Category C(S)	14570	Upload Photo
Tyninghame House Dairy				56°00′40″N 2°36′31″W	Category B	14588	Upload Photo
Whitekirk, Tithe Barn (Or Granary)				56°01′33″N 2°38′59″W	Category A	14617	Upload Photo
Knowes Farm Shop				55°59′27″N 2°37′33″W	Category C(S)	14571	Upload Photo
Knowes Mill House				55°59′37″N 2°37′57″W	Category B	14572	Upload Photo
Tyninghame, Main Street, Jasmine Cottage				56°00′14″N 2°37′34″W	Category C(S)	14590	Upload Photo
Tyninghame, Main Street, Village Hall (Old Baker's House)				56°00′11″N 2°37′37″W	Category B	14596	Upload Photo
Whitekirk, 1 (Post Cottage) And 2 Farm Cottages				56°01′31″N 2°39′04″W	Category C(S)	14600	Upload Photo
Whitekirk, Primary School With Retaining Wall				56°01′29″N 2°39′00″W	Category C(S)	14616	Upload Photo
Tyninghame, Factor's House Dovecot And Outbuildings				56°00′15″N 2°37′30″W	Category B	14585	Upload Photo
Tyninghame House Stables				56°00′40″N 2°36′33″W	Category C(S)	14607	Upload Photo
Tyninghame House, Sundial				56°00′35″N 2°36′46″W	Category A	14608	Upload Photo
Tyninghame, Main Street, Cottage				56°00′10″N 2°37′40″W	Category C(S)	14611	Upload Photo
Tyninghame, Main Street, K6 Telephone Kiosk On Village Green				56°00′11″N 2°37′40″W	Category B	14618	Upload Photo

== Key ==
The scheme for classifying buildings in Scotland is:

- Category A: "buildings of national or international importance, either architectural or historic; or fine, little-altered examples of some particular period, style or building type."
- Category B: "buildings of regional or more than local importance; or major examples of some particular period, style or building type, which may have been altered."
- Category C: "buildings of local importance; lesser examples of any period, style, or building type, as originally constructed or moderately altered; and simple traditional buildings which group well with other listed buildings."

In March 2016 there were 47,288 listed buildings in Scotland. Of these, 8% were Category A, and 50% were Category B, with the remaining 42% being Category C.

== See also ==
- List of listed buildings in East Lothian
