= List of listed buildings in Aberlady, East Lothian =

This is a list of listed buildings in the parish of Aberlady in East Lothian, Scotland.

== List ==
Name	Location	Date Listed	Grid Ref. (Note: Sometimes known as OSGB36, the grid reference (where provided) is based on the British national grid reference system used by the Ordnance Survey. • "Guide to National Grid". Ordnance Survey. • "Get-a-map". Ordnance Survey.)	Geo-coordinates	Notes	LB Number (Note: Historic Environment Scotland assign a unique alphanumeric identifier to each designated site in Scotland, for listed buildings this always begins with "LB", for example "LB12345".)	Image
Aberlady Main Street The Manse With Garden Walls And Grotto				56°00′32″N 2°51′51″W	Category C(S)	6504	Upload Photo
Aberlady Main Street White Cottage				56°00′34″N 2°51′33″W	Category C(S)	6513	Upload Photo
Aberlady 1-3 Inclusive Winton Place				56°00′35″N 2°51′30″W	Category C(S)	6522	Upload Photo
Aberlady Mains Cottages				56°00′25″N 2°51′07″W	Category B	6524	Upload Photo
Aberlady Mains Steading South Range And Cottage				56°00′27″N 2°51′06″W	Category C(S)	6526	Upload Photo
Craigielaw Farmhouse				56°00′25″N 2°52′38″W	Category B	6531	Upload Photo
Gosford Boat House				55°59′55″N 2°52′10″W	Category B	6534	Upload Photo
Gosford Curling House				55°59′55″N 2°52′29″W	Category B	6536	Upload Photo
Gosford Hungary House Former Dog Kennels And Game Larders				55°59′59″N 2°51′39″W	Category A	6539	Upload another image
Gosford North Lodges Gatepiers And Sea Wall				55°59′54″N 2°53′04″W	Category B	6543	Upload Photo
Gosford Stables				55°59′52″N 2°52′32″W	Category A	6547	Upload Photo
Longniddry Lyars Road Eventyr With Retaining Walls Lodge And Gatepiers				55°59′04″N 2°53′40″W	Category B	6550	Upload Photo
Luffness, The Kennels				56°00′54″N 2°49′48″W	Category B	6552	Upload Photo
Luffness Dovecot				56°00′51″N 2°50′33″W	Category A	6554	Upload another image
Luffness Mains Cottages				56°00′32″N 2°49′35″W	Category B	6557	Upload Photo
Luffness Mill, Kiln				56°01′05″N 2°50′04″W	Category B	6559	Upload Photo
Luffness Quarry House				56°00′44″N 2°51′06″W	Category B	6560	Upload Photo
Aberlady Main Street Beechwood And Retaining Wall				56°00′33″N 2°51′41″W	Category C(S)	4340	Upload Photo
Aberlady Main Street The Gardens With Carriage House And Garden Walls				56°00′36″N 2°51′26″W	Category B	4345	Upload Photo
Redhouse Cottages				55°59′01″N 2°51′43″W	Category C(S)	47608	Upload Photo
Aberlady Main Street Merrileas Cottage				56°00′33″N 2°51′39″W	Category C(S)	6506	Upload Photo
Aberlady Main Street Mounting Block Or Loupin-On Stane				56°00′29″N 2°51′53″W	Category C(S)	6507	Upload Photo
Aberlady Main Street 1-10 Inclusive Red Row				56°00′32″N 2°51′44″W	Category B	6515	Upload Photo
Aberlady Winton Place Winton				56°00′35″N 2°51′30″W	Category B	6521	Upload Photo
Aberlady The Wynd Sunset View				56°00′37″N 2°51′36″W	Category C(S)	6523	Upload Photo
Ballencrieff House Including Walled Garden And West Pavilion				55°59′41″N 2°49′22″W	Category B	6529	Upload Photo
Craigielaw Farm Cottages				56°00′27″N 2°52′20″W	Category B	6530	Upload Photo
Aberlady Main Street The Lodge With Stables Gatepiers And Railings				56°00′30″N 2°51′48″W	Category B	4348	Upload Photo
Aberlady Main Street Parish Church Church Of Scotland With Graveyard				56°00′31″N 2°51′53″W	Category A	6508	Upload Photo
Aberlady Main Street 11 And 12 Red Row				56°00′32″N 2°51′38″W	Category B	6516	Upload Photo
Aberlady Winton Place Hall House				56°00′35″N 2°51′31″W	Category B	6520	Upload Photo
Gosford Gardener's Cottage				56°00′07″N 2°52′30″W	Category B	6540	Upload Photo
Kilspindie				56°00′45″N 2°52′21″W	Category B	6549	Upload Photo
Luffness, House With East Wing Stables And Yard. The Pend, Italian Garden And Sundials				56°00′51″N 2°50′38″W	Category A	6551	Upload another image See more images
Luffness Gardener's House				56°00′48″N 2°50′47″W	Category C(S)	6556	Upload Photo
Luffness Mill Cottages				56°01′06″N 2°50′15″W	Category C(S)	6558	Upload Photo
Redhouse Dovecot				55°59′00″N 2°51′45″W	Category A	6564	Upload Photo
Aberlady Main Street Hawthorn Villa				56°00′34″N 2°51′37″W	Category B	4347	Upload Photo
Aberlady Main Street 4 Haddington Place Formerly Seaview				56°00′34″N 2°51′28″W	Category C(S)	4349	Upload Photo
Aberlady, Back Lane, Town Wall				56°00′28″N 2°51′53″W	Category C(S)	49597	Upload Photo
Aberlady Main Street 1 and 2 Manor Place				56°00′34″N 2°51′38″W	Category C(S)	6502	Upload Photo
Aberlady Main Street 4 Manor Place				56°00′34″N 2°51′38″W	Category C(S)	6503	Upload Photo
Aberlady Main Street Shell Cottage				56°00′33″N 2°51′44″W	Category C(S)	6511	Upload Photo
Aberlady Main Street The Wagon Inn				56°00′33″N 2°51′43″W	Category B	6512	Upload Photo
Ballencrieff Granary				55°59′35″N 2°49′38″W	Category A	6528	Upload Photo
Gosford House With Screen Walls And Garden Statuary				55°59′50″N 2°52′44″W	Category A	6533	Upload Photo
Gosford Park Footbridge				55°59′54″N 2°52′09″W	Category C(S)	6544	Upload Photo
Gosford Park Footbridge				55°59′54″N 2°52′09″W	Category C(S)	6545	Upload Photo
Luffness Walled Garden				56°00′46″N 2°50′44″W	Category B	6561	Upload Photo
Aberlady Main Street Bayview				56°00′35″N 2°51′29″W	Category C(S)	4339	Upload Photo
Aberlady Main Street The Gardens Bee Bole Wall				56°00′39″N 2°51′26″W	Category B	4346	Upload Photo
Aberlady Main Street The Quill Gallery				56°00′34″N 2°51′36″W	Category C(S)	6509	Upload Photo
Aberlady Main Street Rose Cottage				56°00′33″N 2°51′35″W	Category C(S)	6510	Upload Photo
Gosford Game Larders At Hungary House				56°00′00″N 2°51′39″W	Category B	6538	Upload Photo
Luffness Garden Walls				56°00′46″N 2°50′44″W	Category B	6555	Upload Photo
Aberlady Station Dyer Transport Shed Former Gas Works				56°00′15″N 2°51′07″W	Category C(S)	6518	Upload Photo
Gosford Bothy Cottage				56°00′07″N 2°52′27″W	Category B	6535	Upload Photo
Gosford Mausoleum Enclosure And Gatepiers				56°00′01″N 2°52′27″W	Category A	6542	Upload another image
Gosford Park Ha-Ha And Aqueduct				55°59′54″N 2°52′09″W	Category C(S)	6546	Upload Photo
Spittal House				55°59′02″N 2°51′06″W	Category C(S)	6565	Upload Photo
Aberlady Main Street Connor Cottage And Retaining Wall				56°00′33″N 2°51′36″W	Category C(S)	4341	Upload Photo
Aberlady Main Street The Cross Cottage And Retaining Wall				56°00′34″N 2°51′39″W	Category C(S)	4342	Upload Photo
Aberlady Main Street Golf Cottage				56°00′33″N 2°51′34″W	Category C(S)	4343	Upload Photo
Aberlady, Seawynd, Maltings (Former Granary				56°00′35″N 2°51′33″W	Category B	49598	Upload Photo
Aberlady Main Street Mercat Cross				56°00′34″N 2°51′39″W	Category A	6505	Upload another image
Aberlady 23 Main Street				56°00′35″N 2°51′29″W	Category B	6514	Upload Photo
Ballencrieff Farmhouse Including Steading Buildings				55°59′34″N 2°49′42″W	Category B	6527	Upload Photo
Fountainhead				55°59′01″N 2°51′21″W	Category B	6532	Upload Photo
Gosford Ice House				55°59′58″N 2°52′12″W	Category B	6541	Upload Photo
Luffness Water Tower				56°00′39″N 2°50′51″W	Category B	6562	Upload Photo
Redhouse Castle And Gateway				55°59′01″N 2°51′46″W	Category A	6563	Upload Photo
Spittal House Lodge				55°59′05″N 2°51′08″W	Category C(S)	6566	Upload Photo
Aberlady Main Street Grove Cottage And Retaining Wall				56°00′34″N 2°51′37″W	Category C(S)	4344	Upload Photo
Aberlady Main Street 5 Haddington Place				56°00′34″N 2°51′29″W	Category C(S)	4350	Upload Photo
Aberlady, Back Road/ Rig Street The Cottage				56°00′31″N 2°51′31″W	Category C(S)	6517	Upload Photo
Aberlady 10 West Main Street				56°00′30″N 2°51′49″W	Category C(S)	6519	Upload Photo
Aberlady Mains Farmhouse				56°00′26″N 2°51′14″W	Category C(S)	6525	Upload Photo
Gosford East Lodge				56°00′12″N 2°52′35″W	Category B	6537	Upload Photo
Gosford Walled Garden				56°00′07″N 2°52′19″W	Category B	6548	Upload Photo
Luffness, The Kennels, Cottage				56°00′54″N 2°49′48″W	Category C(S)	6553	Upload Photo

== Key ==
The scheme for classifying buildings in Scotland is:

- Category A: "buildings of national or international importance, either architectural or historic; or fine, little-altered examples of some particular period, style or building type."
- Category B: "buildings of regional or more than local importance; or major examples of some particular period, style or building type, which may have been altered."
- Category C: "buildings of local importance; lesser examples of any period, style, or building type, as originally constructed or moderately altered; and simple traditional buildings which group well with other listed buildings."

In March 2016 there were 47,288 listed buildings in Scotland. Of these, 8% were Category A, and 50% were Category B, with the remaining 42% being Category C.

== See also ==
- List of listed buildings in East Lothian
