= General View of Agriculture county surveys =

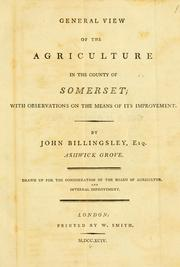
General View of the Agriculture of Somerset

The General View series of county surveys was an initiative of the Board of Agriculture of Great Britain, of the early 1790s. Many of these works had second editions in the 1810s.

The Board, set up by Sir John Sinclair, was generally a proponent of enclosures.

== England ==
County	Title	Year	Author	Comment
Bedfordshire	General View of the Agriculture of the County of Bedford	1794	Thomas Stone	Bedfordshire was noted for barley, but had some market gardening. Joan Thirsk comments that the conservatism noted in the reports for arable farming was overstated.
		1808, 1813	Thomas Batchelor	Included contributions by Charles Abbot. Batchelor observed the expansion of straw plaiting, carried out largely by women and children.
Berkshire	General View of the Agriculture in Berkshire	1794	William Pearce
	General View of the Agriculture of Berkshire	1809, 1813	William Fordyce Mavor
Buckinghamshire	General View of the Agriculture of the County of Buckingham	1794	William James, Jacob Malcolm	James and Malcolm were of Stockwell, according to the title page.
	General View of the Agriculture of Buckinghamshire	1810 1813	St. John Priest, Richard Parkinson	Priest wrote also Delectus Graecorum Sententiarum (1798). A Senior Wrangler, he was vicar of Scarning, and died in 1818. The title page mentions him as Secretary to the Norfolk Agricultural Society.
Cambridgeshire	General View of the Agriculture in the County of Cambridge	1794	Charles Vancouver	Vancouver and then Gooch listed 26 parishes where underdraining had been carried out as a land improvement.
		1811, 1813	William Gooch	William Gooch, A.B. was a cleric who signed the work in 1807 from Whatfield parsonage, Suffolk. Gooch, a neighbour and protégé of Arthur Young, was a curate there when brought in to revise the Cambridgeshire survey. Young then recommended him to John Upton, 1st Viscount Templetown as agent for Castle Upton, an appointment that had a poor outcome.
Cheshire	General View of the Agriculture of the County Palatine of Chester	1794	Thomas Wedge
	General View of the Agriculture of Cheshire	1808, 1813	Henry Holland	Holland advocated for threshing machines, and paring and burning (a technique for bringing land into cultivation).
Cornwall	General View of the Agriculture of the County of Cornwall	1794	Robert Fraser
		1811	George Bouchier Worgan	Worgan, who had fallen into financial difficulties, was given the task of revising the survey by Young, after Richard Parkinson and Humphry Davy had turned it down The report was worked over by Charles Penrose, the Rev. Robert Walker, and the Rev. Jeremiah Trist.
Cumberland	General View of the Agriculture of the County of Cumberland		John Bailey, George Culley	Bailey was land agent to Charles Bennet, 4th Earl of Tankerville, at Chillingham Castle. -
Derbyshire	General View of the Agriculture of the County of Derby	1794	Thomas Brown
	General View of the Agriculture and Minerals of Derbyshire	I (1811) II (1813) III (1817)	John Farey, Sr.
Devon	General View of the Agriculture of the County of Devon	1794	Robert Fraser
	General View of the Agriculture of Devon	1808, 1809	Charles Vancouver	The survey noted that pack horses, except in hilly areas, were being replaced by wagons and carts. In general the county's agriculture was not in period of rapid change.
Dorset	General View of the Agriculture, in the County of Dorset	1793	John Claridge	Claridge was of Craigs Court, London.
	General View of the Agriculture of the County of Dorset	1812	William Stevenson
County Durham	General View of the Agriculture of the County of Durham	1794	Joseph Granger	Introduction by Sir William Appleby. Granger was a land surveyor at Heugh, near Durham.
		1810	John Bailey
Essex	General View of the Agriculture of the County of Essex	1794	Messrs. Griggs	This was a short report of 29 pages. The Griggs were of Hill House, Kelvedon.
	General View of the Agriculture in the County of Essex	1795	Charles Vancouver
	General View of the Agriculture of the County of Essex I, II	1807	Arthur Young
Gloucestershire	General View of the Agriculture of the County of Gloucester	1794	George Turner	Turner was of Dowdeswell.
		1807	Thomas Rudge
Hampshire	General View of the Agriculture of the County of Hants	1794	Abraham and William Driver	The authors were great-uncles of Robert Collier Driver, and were land agents and surveyors in Surrey. Included was Richard Warner, on the Isle of Wight.
	General View of the Agriculture of Hampshire, Including the Isle of Wight	1810	Charles Vancouver
Herefordshire	General View of the Agriculture of the County of Hereford	1794	John Clark	It has been commented that Clark gave two pages to mistletoe, but had only a few words for Hereford cattle.
		1805	John Duncumb
Hertfordshire	General View of the Agriculture of the County of Hertford	1795	D. Walker
	General View of the Agriculture of Hertfordshire	1804	Arthur Young	-
Huntingdonshire	General View of the Agriculture of the County of Huntingdon	1793	George Maxwell
		1793	Thomas Stone??
	General View of the Agriculture of the County of Huntingdon	1811	Richard Parkinson
Kent	A General View of the Agriculture of the County of Kent	1786	John Boys
Lancashire	General View of the Agriculture of the County of Lancaster	1794	John Holt
	General View of the Agriculture of Lancashire	1815	Richard Watson Dickson
Leicestershire	General View of the Agriculture of Leicester	1794	John Monk	Monk reported on the sheep breeding of Robert Bakewell.
	General View of the Agriculture of the County of Leicester	1819 (ODNB)	William Pitt
Lincolnshire	General View of the Agriculture of Lincoln	1794	Thomas Brace Stone
	General View of the Agriculture of the County of Lincoln	1799	Arthur Young
	General View of the Agriculture of the County of Lincolnshire		Arthur Young
Middlesex	General View of the Agriculture of the County of Middlesex	1793	Thomas Baird
		1794	Peter Foot	Surveyor of Dean Street, Soho, London.
		1798, 1813 (2nd edition)	John Middleton	On the 1813 title page, Middleton is described as a land surveyor, and as farming at West Barns Farm, Merton, and Lambeth, Surrey.
Northamptonshire	General View of the Agriculture of the County of Northampton	1809 (ODNB)	William Pitt
	General View of the Agriculture of the County of Northamptonshire		James Donaldson
Northumberland	General View of the Agriculture of the County of Northumberland		John Bailey, George Culley
Norfolk	General View of the Agriculture of the County of Norfolk	1794	Nathaniel Kent
		1804, 1813	Arthur Young
Nottinghamshire	General View of the Agriculture of the County of Nottingham	1794, reprinted 1798	Robert Lowe	Robert Lowe, of Oxton, was High Sheriff of Nottinghamshire in 1802. Father of Rev. Robert Lowe (1780–1845), rector of Bingham, he was grandfather of Robert Lowe the Chancellor of the Exchequer.
Oxfordshire	General View of the Agriculture of the County of Oxford	1794	Richard Davis
		1809	Arthur Young
Rutland	General View of the Agriculture of the County of Rutland	1794	John Crutchley
		1808	Richard Parkinson
Shropshire	General View of the Agriculture of the County of Salop	1794	John Bishton senior (ODNB)
	General View of the Agriculture of Shropshire	1803	Peter Plough (collective pseudonym)	Joseph Babington, John Stackhouse, Thomas Telford, Robert Townson and William Withering were involved in the compilation; also William Reynolds. The editor was Joseph Plymley, from 1804 Joseph Corbett.
		1812	Joseph Plymley?
Somerset	General View of the Agriculture in the County of Somerset		John Billingsley	Billingsley went to the antiquarian Richard Locke for information.
Staffordshire	General View of the Agriculture of Stafford	1794 (ODNB)	William Pitt
Suffolk	General View of the Agriculture of the County of Suffolk	1794, 1797	Arthur Young
Surrey	General View of the Agriculture of the County of Surrey	1794	William Malcolm
		1809	William Stevenson
Sussex	General View of the Agriculture of the County of Sussex	1793, 1808? (ODNB)	Arthur Young (the Younger)
Warwickshire	General View of the Agriculture of the County of Warwick	1794	John Wedge
	General View of the Agriculture of Warwick	1815	Adam Murray
Westmorland	General View of the Agriculture of Westmoreland	1794	Andrew Pringle
Wiltshire	General View of the Agriculture of the County of Wiltshire	1794	Thomas Davis
Worcestershire	General View of the Agriculture of the County of Worcester	1794	William Thomas Pomeroy
		1813 (ODNB)	William Pitt
Yorkshire, East Riding	General View of the Agriculture of the East Riding of Yorkshire	1794	Isaac Leatham
		1812	Henry Eustasius Strickland	Strickland (1777–1865) was the youngest son of Sir George Strickland, 5th Baronet.
Yorkshire, North Riding	General View of the Agriculture of the North Riding of Yorkshire	1794	John Tuke	Tuke was a land surveyor of Lincroft, near York.
Yorkshire, West Riding	General View of the Agriculture of the West Riding of Yorkshire	1794, 1799	Robert Brown, George Rennie, John Shirreff	In 1794, the authors signed (p. 8) from Haddington, East Lothian.

== Ireland ==
County	Title	Year	Author	Comment
King's County (now County Offaly)	General View of the Agriculture and Manufactures of King's County	1801	Sir Charles Coote, 2nd Baronet	Coote (1765–1857) was the illegitimate son of Charles Coote, 1st Earl of Bellomont.
Queen's County (now County Laois	General View of the Agriculture and Manufactures of Queen's County		Sir Charles Coote
County Wicklow	General View of the Agriculture and Mineralogy, Present State and Circumstances of the County of Wicklow	1801	Robert Fraser

== Scotland ==
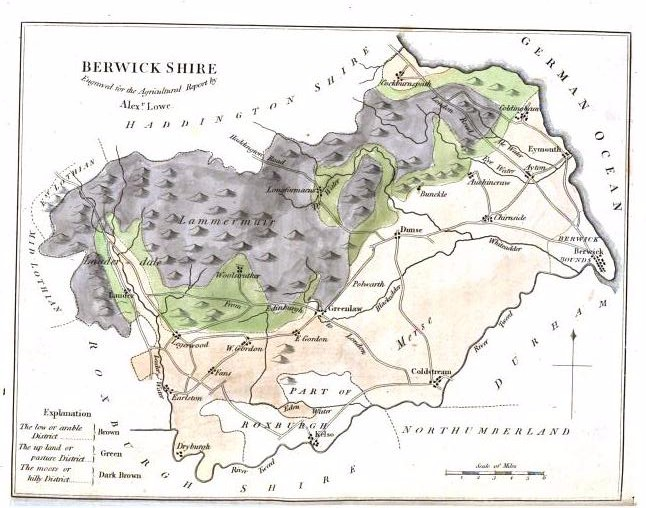
Map from General View of the Agriculture of the County of Berwick (1794)

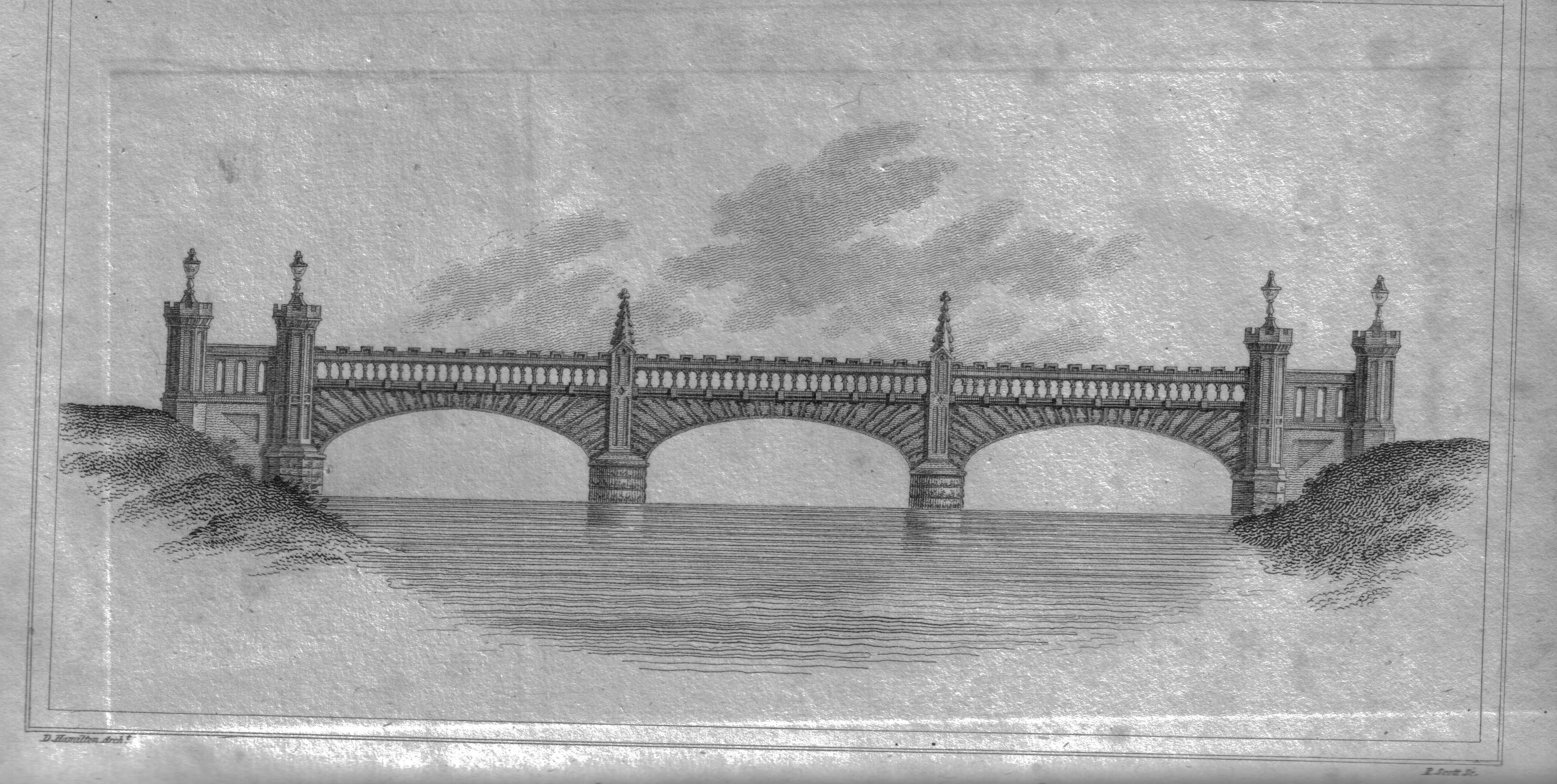
Eglinton Castle Bridge, illustration from General View of the Agriculture of the County of Ayr (1811)

County	Title	Year	Author	Comment
Aberdeenshire	General View of the Agriculture and Rural Economy of the County of Aberdeen	1794	James Anderson
	General View of the Agriculture of Aberdeenshire	1811	George Skene Keith
Angus	General View of the Agriculture of the County of Angus and Forfar	1794	George Dempster
	A General View of the Agriculture of Angus	1794	James Roger	Roger (1767–1849) was minister at Dunino and father of Charles Rogers.
	General View of the Agriculture of the County of Angus, or Forfarshire	1813	James Headrick
Argyllshire	General View of the Agriculture in the County of Argyll. And Western Part of Inverness-shire	1794	James Robson
	General View of the Agriculture of the County of Argyll	1798	John Smith
Ayrshire	General View of the Agriculture of the County of Ayr	1793	William Fullarton
		1811	William Aiton
Banffshire	General View of the Agriculture of the County of Banff	1794	James Donaldson
	General View of the Agriculture of the County of Banff	1812	David Souter
Berwickshire	General View of the Agriculture of the County of Berwick	1794	Alexander Lowe	Appendix by Arthur Bruce of the Natural History Society of Edinburgh. The 1799 History of Berwick by John Fuller had its origins in a submission as the Berwickshire survey.
		1808	Robert Kerr
Bute	General View of the Agriculture of the County of Bute	1816	William Aiton
Caithness	General View of the Agriculture of the County of Caithness	1812, 1815	John Henderson
Clackmannanshire	General View of the Agriculture of the County of Clackmannan	1795	John Francis Erskine	Erskine was of Marr.
Clydesdale	General View of the Agriculture of the County of Clydesdale	1794, 1813	John Naismith
Dumbartonshire	General View of the Agriculture in the County of Dumbarton	1794	David Ure
	General View of the Agriculture of the County of Dumbarton	1811	Andrew Whyte, Duncan Macfarlan
Dumfriesshire	General View of the Agriculture of the County of Dumfries	1794	Bryce Johnstone	Johnstone was a minister at Holywood.
		1812	William Singer
Fifeshire	General View of the Agriculture of the County of Fife	1794	Robert Beatson of Pitteadie (1732–1815)
	General View of the Agriculture of Fife	1800	John D. D. Thomson
Galloway	General View of the Agriculture of Galloway, Comprehending... Kirkcudbright and... Wigton	1794	James Webster
	General View of the Agriculture of Galloway	1806 (ODNB)	Samuel Smith	Smith (died 1816) was minister at Borgue, and was grandfather of Samuel Smith (1836–1906).
Hebrides	General View of the Agriculture of the Hebrides, or Western Isles of Scotland		James Macdonald	Macdonald advocated the adoption of the potato as a staple of diet.
Central Highlands	General View of the Agriculture of the Central Highlands of Scotland	1794	William Marshall
Inverness-shire	General View of the Agriculture of the County of Inverness	1808	James Robertson
Kincardineshire	General View of the Agriculture of the County of Kincardine	1795	James Donaldson
	General View of Kincardineshire	1813 (ODNB)	George Robertson
Kinross	General View of the Agriculture of the County of Kinross	1797	David Ure
	General View of the Agriculture of the Counties of Kinross and Clackmannan	1814	Patrick Graham
East Lothian	General View of the Agriculture and Rural Economy of East Lothian	1794	George Buchan-Hepburn
	General View of the Agriculture of East Lothian	1805	Robert Somerville
Midlothian	General View of the Agriculture of the County of Mid Lothian	1793 (ODNB), 1794, 1795	George Robertson	The 1795 Edinburgh edition contained "additional remarks of several respectable gentlemen and farmers in the country".
		1812	Robert Bald	Bald was a civil engineer.
West Lothian	General View of the Agriculture of the County of West-Lothian	1794, 1811	James Trotter
Moray	General View of the Agriculture of the County of Elgin or Moray	1794	James Donaldson
Nairn	General View of the Agriculture of the County of Nairn	1794	James Donaldson
	General View of the Agriculture of the Counties of Nairn and Moray	1813	William Leslie	-
Orkneys	General View of the Agriculture of the Orkney Islands	1814	John Shirreff
Peebleshire	General View of the Agriculture of the County of Peebles, with Various Suggestions	1802	Charles Findlater
Perthshire	General View of the Agriculture of the Carse of Gowrie, in the County of Perth	1794	James Donaldson
	General View of the Agriculture in the Southern Districts of the County of Perth	1794	James Robertson
	General View of the Agriculture in the County of Perth	1799	James Robertson
Renfrewshire	General View of the Agriculture of the County of Renfrew		Alexander Martin
	General View of the Agriculture of Renfrewshire ... and an Account of its Commerce and Manufactures	1812	John Wilson
Ross and Cromarty	General Survey of the Counties of Ross and Cromarty	1810	George Steuart Mackenzie
Roxburghshire	General View of the Agriculture of the County of Roxburgh	1794	David Ure
	General View of the Agriculture of the Counties of Roxburgh and Selkirk	1798	Robert Douglas	The survey is considered partisan on the enclosure question.
Selkirkshire	General View of the Agriculture of the County of Selkirk	1794	Thomas Johnston
Shetlands	General View of the Agriculture of the Shetland Islands	1814	John Shirreff
Stirlingshire	General View of the Agriculture of the County of Stirling	1796	R. Belsches
	General View of the Agriculture of Stirlingshire	1812	Patrick Graham
Sutherland	General View of the Agriculture of the County of Sutherland	1812	John Henderson
Tweedale	General View of the Agriculture of the County of Tweedale	1794	Thomas Johnston

== Wales ==
County	Title	Year	Author	Comment
North Wales	General View of the Agriculture of North Wales	1794	George Kay
	General View of the Agriculture and Domestic Economy of North Wales		Walter Davies
South Wales	General View of the Agriculture and Domestic Economy of South Wales		Walter Davies
Anglesey		1794 (ODNB)	George Kay
Brecknockshire	General View of the Agriculture of the County of Brecknock	1794	John Clark	Clark considered the local cattle to be poor.
Cardigan	General View of the Agriculture of the County of Cardigan		Thomas Lloyd, David Turnor	Lloyd was Capt. Thomas Lloyd R.N. of Cilgwyn, a noted agricultural improver. Turnor was a clergyman, reclaimer of land, and founder of a Society for Encouragement of Agriculture.
Carmarthen	General View of the Agriculture of the County of Carmarthen	1794	Charles Hassall	Hassall was land steward on the Llanstinian estate.
Glamorgan	General View of the Agriculture of the Country of Glamorgan	1796	John Fox
Monmouthshire	General View of the Agriculture of the County of Monmouth	1794	John Fox
		1815	Charles Hassall
Pembrokeshire	General View of the Agriculture of the County of Pembroke	1794	Charles Hassall
Radnorshire	General View of the Agriculture of the County of Radnor	1794	John Clark

== Other ==
County	Title	Year	Author	Comment
Channel Islands	General View of the Agriculture and Present State of the Islands on the Coast of Normandy, Subject to the Crown of Great Britain	1815	Thomas Quayle
Isle of Man	General View of the Agriculture of the Isle of Man	1794	Basil Quayle
		1812	Thomas Quayle

== General ==
William Marshall, who had written the Central Highlands survey, was a rival of Arthur Young, and at odds with him over the surveys. He wrote at length about the reports in 1808 to 1817, producing a five-volume Review, generally critical of the reports. William Lester's History of British Implements and Machinery applicable to Agriculture (1811) drew heavily on extracts from the surveys, where those covered agricultural implements. His introduction commented on the difficulty in referring farmers directly to the reports.

Sir John Sinclair wrote a number of related works:

- General View of the Agriculture of the Northern Counties and Islands of Scotland (1795)
- Account of the Origin of the Board of Agriculture and its Progress for Three Years after its Establishment (1796)
- General Report of the Agricultural State and Political State of Scotland (1814)
- Hints Regarding the Agricultural State of the Netherlands, Compared with that of Great Britain (1815)

== Sources ==
- http://www.bahs.org.uk/LIBRALall.html
