= Richard Noverre Bacon =

English newspaper editor and writer

Richard Noverre Bacon (1798 – 1884) was an English newspaper editor, known as a writer on agriculture.

== Life ==
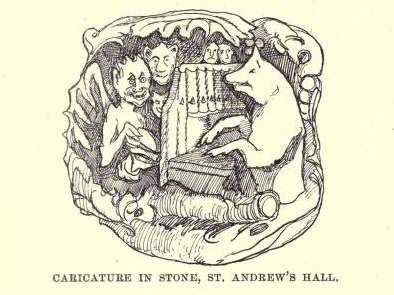
Stone carving in Norwich, believed to be a politically motivated caricature of Richard Noverre Bacon.

He was the son of Richard Mackenzie Bacon of Norwich, and brother of Louisa Mary Bacon. His journalism, over his years editing the Norwich Mercury which he took over from his father, promoted the current views on political economy. He was cool on the role of the monarchy.

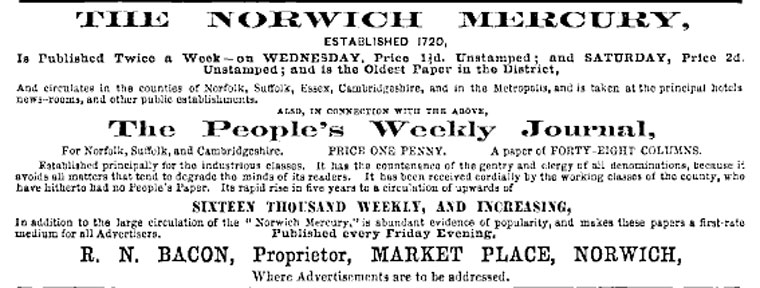
1869 advertisement for the Norwich Mercury, mentioning also the People's Weekly Journal started by John Ellor Taylor who worked for Bacon.

== Works ==
Bacon was an admirer of Thomas William Coke, and one of his aspiring biographers, as reported by Francis Blaikie. His work in that direction was in vain, however: Thomas Keppel, Coke's brother-in-law, took over as official biographer, gathering in the existing materials, and his biography was then lost in manuscript.

Bacon wrote his major work as a prize essay for the Royal Agricultural Society in 1843: it is considered the most detailed account of agriculture in Norfolk in the 19th century. He sent out over 80 questionnaires to prominent farmers in the county, the replies to which are still on record. The second edition appeared as The History of the Agriculture of Norfolk (1849). The work is a successor to the 18th century agricultural authors who wrote on Norfolk agriculture: Nathaniel Kent, William Marshall and Arthur Young.
