= Charles Vancouver =

British agriculturalist

Charles Vancouver (c. 1756 – c. 1815) was an Anglo-American agricultural writer. He worked with varying success in several countries.

== Life ==
He was baptised in a Dutch family at King's Lynn, Norfolk in November 1756, and was an elder brother of George Vancouver. He learned farming in Norfolk, and then was found, around 1776, a post in Ireland working for Lord Shelburne by Arthur Young, at Rahan. He worked there on bog drainage, and during the 1780s took on related reclamation work in Kentucky. Kentucky was being settled at this time by westward migration, and Vancouver had a large holding (53,000 acres) there.

In 1789 Vancouver was trying to establish a settlement on the Big Sandy River, where he had 15,000 acres from 1785. The plan encountered resistance from Native Americans, who by the account of John Hanks, who accompanied Vancouver, stole the party's horses. Vancouver was hoping the intended road from Staunton, Virginia to Lexington, Kentucky would open up the area and went back east to lay in stores. But he also lost financially in schemes of James Wilkinson. The trial settlement, around where Louisa, Kentucky now is, lasted until April 1790. Vancouver returned to Sussex in England. A plan he had for exploring the Nootka Sound via an overland route was intended to be put to Sir Joseph Banks through Thomas Martyn.

On the establishment of the Board of Agriculture in 1793, Vancouver was engaged by Sir John Sinclair to write reports on the state of agriculture in some of the English counties. Maria Josepha Holroyd wrote of him in July 1795 as a sensible, well-informed man, who had visited several countries.

From the late 1790s Vancouver travelled again, working in the Netherlands and marrying there. He returned also to his American estates, and he stated in 1807 that he has been engaged in "cutting down the woodland and clearing the forests in Kentucky". In 1806 he was again in England, and Young mentions that he was consulted by Nicholas Vansittart. He reportedly died in 1815, in Virginia.

== Works ==
Vancouver's first book A general Compendium of Chemical, Experimental, and Natural Philosophy, with a complete System of Commerce, was published at Philadelphia in 1785. In 1786 he was described as "Vancouver of Philadelphia" in Arthur Young's Annals of Agriculture, to which he contributed a glowing account of the farming of Kentucky.

The Board of Agriculture published in 1794 an account of Vancouver's tour in Cambridgeshire, and in 1795 an account of a similar tour in Essex. He wrote two more reports for the Board's General View of Agriculture county surveys: on the county Devon, (1808, republished in 1813); and on Hampshire (1813). William Marshall, who criticised most of the board's reports, spoke of Vancouver's Cambridgeshire, though not of the other reports.

Vancouver wrote in 1794 a paper on the drainage of the fens of the Great Level, and especially of Cambridgeshire. It remained unprinted for 17 years, and finally appeared as an appendix to the Huntingdon Report.
