= Sinnington Grange Hall =

Building in Sinnington, North Yorkshire, England

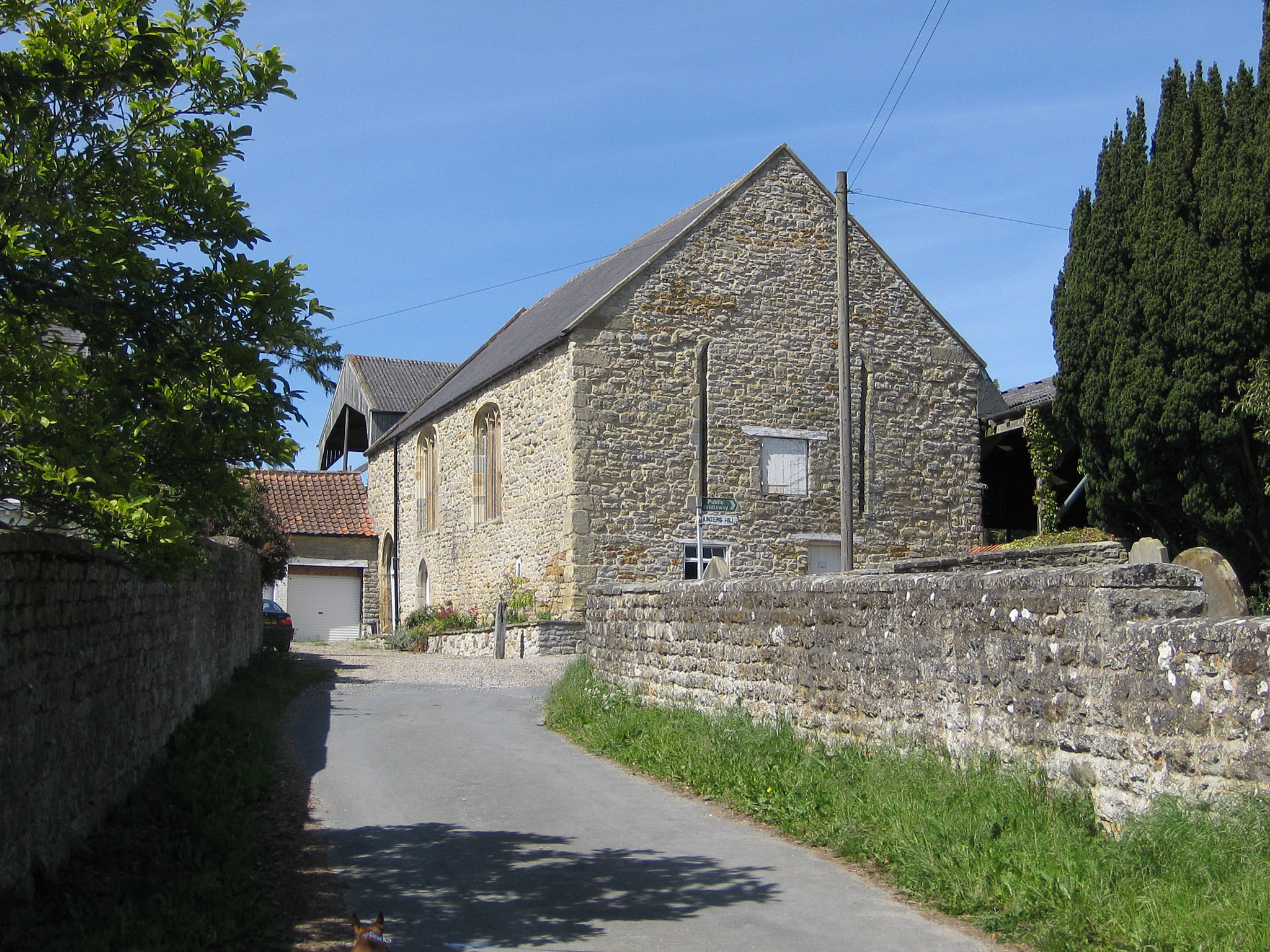
The building, in 2011

Sinnington Grange Hall is a historic building in Sinnington, a village in North Yorkshire, in England.

In 1168, Ralph de Clere gave property in Sinnington to Guisborough Priory, for a monastic grange. In 1239, Yedingham Priory agreed to support the grange. At some point before 1430, its great hall was converted into a chapel. In 1431/32, Matilda of York paid for alterations to the chapel, including the insertion of a floor and partitions, and filling in some of the old windows. After the Dissolution of the Monasteries, much of the grange was demolished, but the chapel survived, converted to become the rectory of All Saints' Church, Sinnington. Probably in the 17th century, the building was re-roofed and converted into a barn and stables. A 15th-century oak screen survived in the building until the early 20th century. The building was grade I listed in 1953.

The building is constructed of Coralline limestone, and has a slate roof. There are two storeys and two bays. The main doorway has a double-chamfered surround and a moulded pointed arch, and to the right is a lower doorway with a chamfered and quoined surround and a pointed arch. Elsewhere, there are various windows and doorways, some blocked.

== See also ==
- Grade I listed buildings in North Yorkshire (district)
- Listed buildings in Sinnington
