= John Bailey (agriculturist) =

English agriculturist and engraver

John Bailey (1750–1819), was an English agriculturist and engraver.

== Life ==
Bailey was the son of William Bailey, of Blades Field, near Bowes, then in Yorkshire, now in County Durham, where he was born in 1750. At an early age he manifested artistic tendencies. While employed as tutor to his uncle's children he devoted his leisure hours to engraving various pieces, which he afterwards published. Both in his artistic and mathematical studies he received assistance from his uncle.

After completing the education of his uncle's children he became a mathematical teacher at Witton-le-Wear, and began also the business of a land surveyor. Shortly after his marriage he was appointed land agent to Charles Bennet, 4th Earl of Tankerville at Chillingham, a situation he retained till his death, 4 June 1819, in his sixty-ninth year.

== Works ==
Bailey engraved plates for the works of William Hutchinson, the topographer of Cumberland, Durham, and Northumberland. He devoted attention to the natural sciences, especially mineralogy, chemistry, hydraulics, and pneumatics, used by him in promoting improvements in rural economy; in 1795 he published an Essay on the Construction of the Plough, in which he employed mathematical calculations to demonstrate the advantages of the alterations he proposed. He was also the joint author of the reports on the counties of Cumberland, Durham, and Northumberland, in the General Views of Agriculture series, drawn up for the Board of Agriculture.
