= Sinnington Grange Mill =

Mill building in Sinnington, North Yorkshire, England

Coordinates: 54.2475°N 0.8679°W

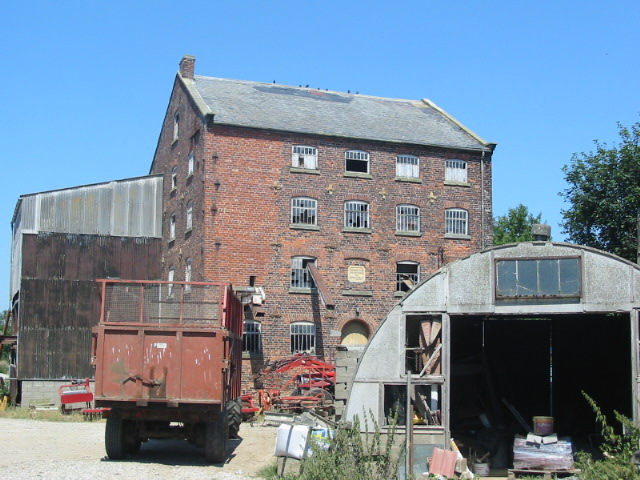
The building, in 2006

Sinnington Grange Mill is a historic building in Sinnington, a village in North Yorkshire, in England.

There has been a watermill on the River Seven in Sinnington since the Mediaeval period, during which period it was probably owned by Yedingham Priory. The current corn mill was constructed in 1844, driven by a breastshot waterwheel. It closed in 1978, and the front was partly rebuilt in 1980, following which it was used as a grain-drying store before becoming derelict. The building has been grade II listed since 1987.

The mill has an iron frame enclosed in brick, and a stepped eaves course, and a slate roof with coped gables and shaped kneelers. There are four storeys and a basement, and four bays. Steps lead up to the round-headed doorway, and the windows have segmental heads under cambered brick arches. On the front is a recessed inscribed and dated panel. In the right return is a semicircular arch over the wheel chamber, and the left return has a rounded arch over the tailrace. The waterwheel and pit wheel survive in the basement, as do two grindstones and a sack hoist. Cast iron columns support the upper floors.

== See also ==
- Listed buildings in Sinnington
