= Thomas Batchelor =

Thomas Batchelor may refer to:

- Thomas Batchelor (writer) (1775–1838), English farmer, author on dialect and agriculture, and poet
- Tommy Batchelor (born 1995), American dancer

== See also ==
- Thomas Batchelor House
