= George Robertson (writer) =

Scottish writer

George Robertson (c.1750–1832) was a Scottish topographical, agricultural and genealogical writer.

== Life ==
Born in Midlothian about 1750, Robertson occupied a farm at Granton, near Edinburgh, for many years. He was active in agricultural affairs in various parts of Scotland, from 1765 until shortly before his death.

Robertson moved from Granton to Kincardineshire in 1800, and then to Ayrshire in June 1811. In later life he concentrated on genealogical investigations, working in the library at Eglinton Castle and Glasgow libraries. He died at his residence, Bower Lodge, near Irvine, in 1832.

== Works ==
Robertson's major publications were:

- General View of the Agriculture of the County of Midlothian, with Observations on the Means of its Improvement; drawn up for the Consideration of the Board of Agriculture and Internal Improvement, Edinburgh, 1793; London, 1794; Edinburgh, 1795. In 1807, he authored the publication “Rural Recollections” while living in Kincardineshire, providing the best description of the cattle of that historic county during that time period. Two appendices to his earlier Board of Agriculture publications cover dairy and garden management. Also for the Board of Agriculture, in 1813, he sketched the Agriculture of Kincardineshire, or the Mearns.
- Topographical Description of Ayrshire; more particularly of Cunninghame; together with a Genealogical Account of the principal Families in that Bailiwick, Irvine, 1820.
- A Genealogical Account of the Principal Families in Ayrshire, more particularly in Cunninghame, Irvine, 3 vols., 1823; with index and supplement, issued at Irvine, 1827.
- Rural Recollections; or the Progress of Improvement in Agriculture and Rural Affairs, Irvine, 1829. It covered changes in Scottish agriculture and in the condition of agricultural workers, from direct observation; with appendix of "Extracts respecting Manners and Customs".
- A General Description of the Shire of Renfrew (1818, Paisley), including an account of noble families: with a continuation of The Genealogical History of the Royal and Illustrious Family of the Stewarts (1710), of George Crawfurd.

Robertson also contributed to Arthur Young's Annals of Agriculture; and tracts to the Highland Society.

== Notes ==
Attribution

This article incorporates text from a publication now in the public domain: Lee, Sidney, ed. (1896). "Robertson, George (1750?-1832)". Dictionary of National Biography. Vol. 48. London: Smith, Elder & Co.
