= Richard Parkinson (agriculturist) =

English agriculturist (1748–1815)

Richard Parkinson (born in Lincolnshire, England, in 1748; died in England, 23 February 1815) was an English agriculturist.

== Biography ==
He became a farmer, was interested in improved methods, and was encouraged by Sir John Sinclair, president of the Board of Agriculture, who recommended him to George Washington. He left England 3 September 1798, and was for some time in the employ of Washington as an agriculturist at Mount Vernon, and resided at Orange Hill, near Baltimore.

On his return to England, Parkinson became steward to Sir Joseph Banks in Lincolnshire. He died at Osgodby on 23 February 1815.

== Works ==
He published:

- The Experienced Farmer (2 vols., London, 1798; enlarged ed., with an autobiography, 1807)
- A Tour in America, 1798-1800, containing reminiscences of Washington (2 vols., 1805)
- The English Practice of Farming (1806)
- Gypsum as a Manure (1808)
- Breeding and Management of Live-Stock, a standard work (2 vols., 1809)
- Rutlandshire (1809) and Huntingdonshire (1811) in the General View of Agriculture county surveys.
