= The Fox and Hounds Inn =

Pub in Sinnington, North Yorkshire, England

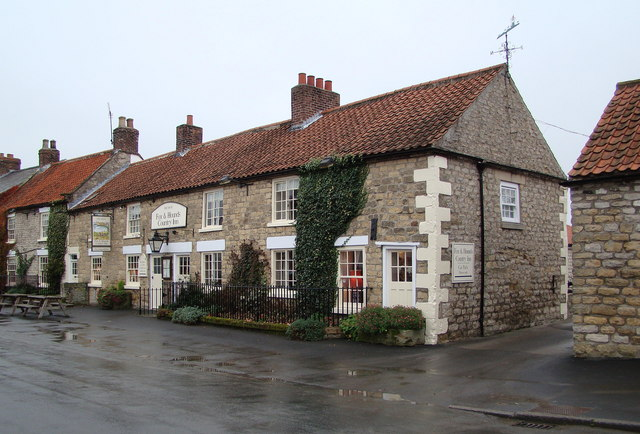
The pub, in 2008

The Fox and Hounds Inn is a historic pub in Sinnington, a village in North Yorkshire, in England.

The inn and adjoining cottage and outbuildings were constructed in the late 18th century, and the inn was extended in 1828. The building was altered in the late 19th century. The building was grade II listed in 1987. The business went into liquidation in 1997, but was purchased by owners who made it a hub for village activities, including sponsoring Sinnington Football Club. They sold it in 2019, at which time, it had a bar and lounge, restaurant, private dining room, residents' lounge, and 10 bedrooms. In 2022, new owners spent £1.25 million refurbishing the pub, increasing the number of bedrooms to 14, with the aim of making it a regional destination.

The range of buildings is in limestone and sandstone, with quoins on the right, a stepped eaves course, and a pantile roof with coped gables and shaped kneelers. There are two storeys, the public house has two bays, with a two-bay extension to the right, and a two-bay cottage and outbuilding further to the right. On the front are four doorways, with a mounting block by the left door, and the windows are sashes. To the right are area railings on a stone plinth, with turned standards and egg finials.

== See also ==
- Listed buildings in Sinnington
