= John Holt (author) =

English author (1743-1801)

- Born: 1743; Hattersley, Cheshire, England
- Died: 1801 (aged 57–58); Walton, Lancashire, England
- Partner: Elizabeth France
- Children: no issue

John Holt (1743 – 21 March 1801) was an English author.

== Life ==
Holt was born at Hattersley, near Mottram in Longdendale, Cheshire, in 1743. About 1757 he settled at Walton-on-the-Hill, near Liverpool, where for many years he acted as parish clerk, highway surveyor, and master of the free grammar school, besides at one time keeping a ladies' school.

He married, in 1767, Elizabeth France of Walton, but had no issue. He died at Walton on 21 March 1801. There is an interesting etched portrait of Holt by his pupil, W. Rogers, of which there are small reproductions in the Gentleman’s Magazine and the Transactions of the Historic Society. A paper "On the Curle in Potatoes" procured him the medal of the Society of Arts. He compiled a few books for the use of schools, wrote one or two novels, and collected materials for a history of Liverpool, which he bequeathed to Matthew Gregson. He contributed many papers to the Gentleman’s Magazine, and for a long period communicated the monthly 'Meteorological Diary' to that periodical.

== Writings ==
Holt published in 1786–8

- Characters of Kings and Queens of England in three volumes (at Google Books)

A few years later, for the Board of Agriculture, he made the agricultural survey of Lancashire, and published in 1794 his results in a

- General View of the Agriculture of the County of Lancaster, with Observations on the Means of its Improvement, reprinted with additions in 1795 (at Google Books).
