= Listed buildings in Sinnington =

Sinnington is a civil parish in the county of North Yorkshire, England. It contains 24 listed buildings that are recorded in the National Heritage List for England. Of these, one is listed at Grade I, the highest of the three grades, one is at Grade II*, the middle grade, and the others are at Grade II, the lowest grade. The parish contains the village of Sinnington and the surrounding countryside. The listed buildings include houses, cottages and associated structures, farmhouses and farm buildings, churches, bridges, a public house, a former corn mill, a mile post and a telephone kiosk.

== Key ==
Grade	Criteria
I	Buildings of exceptional interest, sometimes considered to be internationally important
II*	Particularly important buildings of more than special interest
II	Buildings of national importance and special interest

== Buildings ==
Name and location	Photograph	Date	Notes	Grade
All Saints' Church; 54.26482°N 0.85554°W		12th century	The church has been altered and enlarged during the centuries, including work carried out by C. Hodgson Fowler in 1904. It is built in limestone, incorporating fragments of earlier material, and has roofs of stone flags, slate and tile. The church consists of a nave, a south porch, and a chancel with a vestry, and on the west gable is a bellcote with a sprocketed shingled spirelet and a weathervane. The west doorway is Norman, and has a moulded round arch with attached shafts and scalloped capitals. The south doorway is also Norman, and has a round arch with two orders, and traces of waterleaf on the capitals.	II*
Barn northeast of The Hall; 54.26519°N 0.85600°W		Late 12th century	A grange hall, later converted into a chapel, and then into a barn. It is in Coralline limestone, and has a slate roof. There are two storeys and two bays. The main doorway has a double-chamfered surround and a moulded pointed arch, and to the right is a lower doorway with a chamfered and quoined surround and a pointed arch. Elsewhere, there are various windows and doorways, some blocked.	I
Church Lane Cottage; 54.26411°N 0.85764°W	—	Mid-18th century (or earlier)	The cottage is in sandstone, with an outshut in red brick, and a pantile roof. There is a single storey, three bays and an attic, and an outshut. On the front is a doorway and 20th-century windows, and on the gable end are casement windows.	II
Cliff Cottage; 54.25786°N 0.85607°W	—	Mid to late 18th century	The house is in limestone, with quoins, and a pantile roof with coped gables and shaped kneelers. There are two storeys and two , bays, and a recessed single-bay extension on the right. On the front is a gabled porch, the windows on the front of the main part are casements, on the extension they date from the 20th century, and at the rear is a horizontally sliding sash window.	II
Seven House; 54.26326°N 0.85949°W		Mid to late 18th century	Originally a longhouse, later a house and cottage, it is in sandstone, and has a pantile roof with coped gables and a shaped kneeler on the right. The high end has two storeys and two bays, and the low end to the right has one storey and an attic and two bays. The doorway has a lintel with a tripartite keystone. Most of the windows are horizontally sliding sashes, and there are two gabled dormers. Inside, there is an inglenook fireplace.	II
Sinnington Bridge; 54.26259°N 0.85967°W		1769	The bridge carries Main Street over the River Seven. It is in sandstone, and consists of a single segmental arch of voussoirs. The bridge has a raised band over the arch, a parapet with chamfered coping, raked in the centre, ending in square-section piers with stepped cornices and shallow pyramidal caps. On the southwest pier is a dated sundial.	II.
Bridge Farmhouse and outbuildings 54.26307°N 0.85950°W		Late 18th century	The house and outbuildings are in limestone with pantile roofs. The house has two storeys and three bays, and the outbuildings form a single-storey range to the left. The doorway in the house has a divided fanlight, and the windows are horizontally sliding sashes. The outbuildings contain various openings, some blocked.	II
Friars Hill Farmhouse and barn 54.26104°N 0.86330°W	—	Late 18th century	The farmhouse is in sandstone, with an extension in limestone, and a pantile roof with coped gables and shaped kneelers. There are two storeys and two bays, and a single-bay extension and a barn to the right. The entrance is at the rear, and the windows are sashes, most with keystones. The windows on the extension and barn are horizontally sliding sashes.	II
Sinnington Lodge and wall 54.25240°N 0.86201°W		Late 18th century	A farmhouse in red and cream brick on a sandstone plinth, with a pantile roof, and an extension in red and burnt brick with a slate roof. The house has two storeys and a basement, a double depth plan and three bays, and an extension with two storeys and two bays. The doorway has coved fluted capitals, a radial fanlight, and an open pediment. The windows are sashes with flat gauged brick arches. The garden front has two storeys and three bays, and contains a round-arched doorway with imposts and a keystone, and a cornice hood on grooved consoles. The garden wall is in red brick with pantile and stone coping.	II
Stripe Cottage; 54.26317°N 0.85948°W		Late 18th century	The house is in sandstone, with quoins, a moulded eaves course, and a pantile roof with coped gables and shaped kneelers. There are two storeys and an attic, one bay, and a rear wing and an outshut. The doorway is on the right, and the windows are sashes, the window in the left gable end is horizontally sliding.	II
The Fox and Hounds Inn, cottage, outbuilding and railings 54.26047°N 0.85877°W		Late 18th century	The range of buildings is in limestone and sandstone, with quoins on the right, a stepped eaves course, and a pantile roof with coped gables and shaped kneelers. There are two storeys, the public house has two bays, with a two-bay extension to the right, and a two-bay cottage and outbuilding further to the right. On the front are four doorways, with a mounting block by the left door, and the windows are sashes. To the right are area railings on a stone plinth, with turned standards and egg finials.	II
Vicarage; 54.26460°N 0.85870°W	—	Late 18th century	The vicarage was extended in 1906. The earlier part is in limestone, the extension is in variegated brick, and the roof is slated. There are two storeys and three bays, and a single-bay extension. The doorway has a divided fanlight, and the windows are sashes; one window in the extension is horizontally sliding.	II
Bridge southwest of the Village Hall; 54.26276°N 0.85873°W		c. 1789	A flood bridge on The Green, it is in sandstone. It consists of a single segmental arch of voussoirs about 0.7 metres (2 ft 4 in) in height in the centre of a raised causeway.	II
Sinnington Manor House; 54.26075°N 0.88554°W	—	c. 1790	The house is in plum-red brick on a sandstone plinth, with quoins, a floor band, a modillion cornice, a coped parapet with piers, and a pantile roof with coped gables. There are two storeys and five bays, and a rear wing. In the centre, steps lead up to a Doric porch with a pediment, and a doorway with a chamfered rusticated surround and a fanlight. Above the porch is a round-arched sash window in an architrave, with imposts and a keystone. The other windows are sashes with flat heads, architraves and keystones.	II
Outbuildings north of Sinnington Manor House; 54.26096°N 0.88496°W	—	c. 1790	The barn and attached range of outbuildings are in plum-red brick, with roofs partly of pantile and partly of slate, with coped gables and shaped kneelers. The barn has two storeys and eight bays, and to the right is a range of outbuildings with one storey and lofts, and 13 bays. The barn has full-height doors, slit vents and pitching windows. In the outbuildings are paired cart arches, one blocked, and blocked doorways. Above are square pitching windows, and in the gable end is a pitching doorway.	II
Bridge House and garage 54.26285°N 0.85978°W		Late 18th to early 19th century	An inn, later a house, in sandstone with a pantile roof. There are two storeys, two bays, a rear wing, and a lean-to garage on the left. The doorway is in the centre, and the windows are horizontally sliding sashes.	II
Chest tomb and railings 54.26484°N 0.85530°W	—	1822	The chest tomb is in the churchyard of All Saints' Church, to the east of the church. It is in sandstone, and has recessed sides and convex ends, with raised oval panels in patterned spandrels. On the angles are volutes with foliate reliefs. The south side contains an inscribed panel. The tomb is enclosed by railings with acorn tips, and square section standards with urn finials.	II
Elmsall House and associated structures 54.25948°N 0.85838°W	—	Early 19th century	A farmhouse, later a private house, in limestone, with quoins, and a Welsh slate roof with coped gables and shaped kneelers. There are two storeys and attics, and three bays, and a rear wing with a pantile roof. The windows are sashes, and at the rear is a gabled porch. Associated is a large barn in brick with a stone eaves course and a pantile roof, containing a range of openings, some blocked. In addition, there are more outbuildings, in stone with pantile roofs. The garden is enclosed by stone walls with some brick facing and flat copings, and on the southern boundary is a stone ha-ha.	II
High Grange Farmhouse; 54.24790°N 0.86383°W	—	Early 19th century	The farmhouse is in red and cream brick on a sandstone plinth, with a hipped Roman tile roof. There are two storeys, a double depth plan, and three bays. The doorway has a divided fanlight, the windows are sashes, and all the openings have painted wedge lintels. At the rear is a tripartite sash stair window.	II
Riverside Farmhouse; 54.26387°N 0.85954°W	—	Early 19th century	A farmhouse and cottage, later combined, in sandstone, with a moulded eaves cornice and a pantile roof. There are two storeys and three bays. On the front are two doorways, and the windows are sashes, most with painted lintels and keystones, and one is horizontally sliding.	II
Wesleyan Methodist Church; 54.26167°N 0.85853°W		Early 19th century	The church is in sandstone on a plinth at the front, and in limestone on the returns, with quoins, an impost band, a moulded eaves cornice, and a hipped slate roof. The front has a single storey and two bays. In the centre is a round-headed doorway with a rusticated archivolt and a keystone containing a carved figure in high relief, and the doorway has a radial fanlight. Above it is a segmental recess surrounded by chamfered blocks containing a clock. The flanking windows are full-height sashes with round heads, in architraves with vermiculated imposts and keystones.	II
Sinnington Grange Mill; 54.24749°N 0.86788°W		1844	A corn mill later used for other purposes, with an iron frame enclosed in brick, and with a stepped eaves course, and a slate roof with coped gables and shaped kneelers. There are four storeys and a basement, and four bays. Steps lead up to the round-headed doorway, and the windows have segmental heads under cambered brick arches. On the front is a recessed inscribed and dated panel. In the right return is a semicircular arch over the wheel chamber, and the left return has a rounded arch over the tailrace.	II
Mile post 54.26093°N 0.86810°W		Late 19th century	The mile post is in cast iron, and has a triangular plan and a semicircular head. On the head is inscribed "NORTH RIDING OF YORKSHIRE" and on the sloping top is "PICKERING RDC". The left side shows the distances to Pickering and Scarborough, and on the right side are the distances to Kirbymoorside and Helmsley.	II
Telephone kiosk 54.26162°N 0.85877°W		1935	The telephone kiosk is of the K6 type designed by Giles Gilbert Scott. Constructed in cast iron with a square plan and a dome, it has three unperforated crowns in the top panels.	II
