= John Fuller (surgeon) =

Scottish surgeon and historian

- Died: 14 December 1825; Edinburgh
- Occupations: Surgeon and historian

John Fuller (died 14 December 1825) was a Scottish surgeon and historian.

== Biography ==
Fuller was a historian of Berwick-on-Tweed. He was some years in practice as a surgeon at Ayton, Berwickshire. During that time, in 1785, he published a pamphlet of ‘New Hints relating to Persons Drowned and apparently Dead’ (London, 8vo), in which he proposed transfusion from the carotid artery of a sheep as a means of resuscitation. It does not appear that the method was tried. On 21 November 1789 Fuller, who appears to have had no previous connection with the university, received his M.D. degree at St. Andrews upon testimonials from Messrs. N. and T. Spens, physicians, Edinburgh, Alexander Wood, surgeon, and Andrew Wardrop, physician (Minutes of the university). Afterwards he practised at Berwick. While there in 1794, soon after the formation of the board of agriculture, he addressed to the board suggestions for the collecting of health statistics from counties periodically, and for the formation of a central medical institution and of a national veterinary college. At the request of Sir John Sinclair, president of the board, he prepared in a small compass the account of Berwick for the ‘Statistical Account of Scotland;’ but as he suggested that it required more extended treatment Sinclair agreed to its publication as a separate work, entitled ‘History of Berwick’ (London, 1799), 4to, with plates. Fuller afterwards lived in Edinburgh. Sykes, the border historian, states that in 1824 Fuller issued prospectuses for a general view of the ‘Border History of England and Scotland,’ but that ‘the work was not published during his [Fuller's] lifetime.’ Fuller died at Edinburgh 14 December 1825.
