= David Ure =

Scottish geologist (1749 – 1798)

- Born: 1749; Glasgow, Scotland
- Died: 28 March 1798 (aged 48–49); Uphall, West Lothian, Scotland
- Education: University of Glasgow
- Scientific career
- Fields: Geology

David Ure (1749 – 28 March 1798), was a Scottish Presbyterian minister, historian, geologist and early Scottish palaeontologist. He has been called "the father of Scottish palaeontology"; his book The History of Rutherglen and East-Kilbride contains the first technical illustrations of fossils in Scotland.

== Life ==
Ure was born in Glasgow and baptised there on 30 March 1749; he was the eldest of nine children of Patrick Ure, a weaver, and his wife Isabell Malcolm. His father died while he was still young, but it is understood that this did not occur until sometime after Ure had entered his twenties. His father's death induced Ure to work as a weaver to support his mother. He resolved to enter the ministry, and obtained an education at Glasgow Grammar School, and afterwards at the University of Glasgow (while still a weaver), where he graduated M.A. in 1776; at the university the Greek professor, James Moor, turned his attention to the undeveloped science of geology. While a student in divinity he was for some time assistant schoolmaster at Stewarton, and afterwards he taught a subscription school in the neighbourhood of Dumbarton.

In 1783 he was licensed to preach by the presbytery of Glasgow, and became assistant to David Connell, minister of East Kilbride in Lanarkshire. During his residence in the parish he made researches into its history, and devoted himself particularly to the study of its mineral strata. In 1793 he published the results in The History of Rutherglen and East-Kilbride. The book was supported by public subscription; the geologists James Hutton and John Playfair were among the 700 subscribers. It contains the first scientific descriptions of many fossils, and the first illustrations of fossils in Scotland.

On the death of Connell in 1790, Ure had some expectation of being appointed his successor, but, finding the parish not unanimous, he set off for Newcastle-upon-Tyne on foot, and acted for some time as assistant in the presbyterian church there. He remained there until in Scotland he attracted the attention of Sir John Sinclair, 1st Baronet, who employed him in preparing the first sketches of the agricultural surveys of the counties of Roxburgh, Dumbarton and Kinross for his Statistical Account of Scotland. Ure's treatises were published separately by the Board of Agriculture, the first two in 1794 and the last in 1797. He oversaw the publication of several of the later volumes of the Statistical Account, and drew up the general indices.

In appreciation of his work in December 1795 he was presented by David Erskine, 11th Earl of Buchan to the parish of Uphall in Linlithgow. He was ordained in July 1796. On 28 March 1798 he died of dropsy at Uphall; he was buried in the Erskine family vault, at St Nicholas Kirk in the village.
