= William Shaw (Gaelic scholar) =

Scottish Gaelic scholar, writer, minister and Church of England cleric

William Shaw (1749–1831) was a Scottish Gaelic scholar, writer, minister and Church of England cleric. He is known also as friend and biographer of Samuel Johnson. His 1781 paper on the Ossian controversy is still considered a good survey of critical points.

== Life ==
Shaw was born on 3 February 1749 at Clachaig in the parish of Kilmorie on the Isle of Arran. He was educated at Ayr and at the University of Glasgow, where he graduated M.A. in 1772. On leaving university he went to London, where he was employed by a merchant as a tutor. He became acquainted with Dr. Samuel Johnson, and was one of the literary coterie which met at Bolt Court and Streatham Park.

Entering the ministry of the Church of Scotland, Shaw was presented by the Duke of Gordon, in July 1779, to the parish of Ardclach in the presbytery of Nairn; but resigned the charge 1 August 1780. He was elected a fellow of the Society of Antiquaries of London on 17 May 1781. Induced by Johnson, he took holy orders in the Church of England, and subsequently graduated B.D. from Emmanuel College, Cambridge, in 1800.

On 1 May 1795 Shaw was presented to the rectory of Chelvey, Somerset. He died there on 16 September 1831, aged 83.

== Gaelic language and literature ==
Shaw's first work, published by subscription, was An Analysis of the Gaelic Language, London, 1778 (2nd edition Edinburgh, 1778). Part of the "Proposals" for this work was written by Johnson. The Elements of Gaelic Grammar (1801) of Alexander Stewart later took its place.

Shaw also planned to collect the vocabulary of Scottish Gaelic. Johnson approved and Shaw set off for the Scottish Highlands, financing himself since the Highland Society of London would not, and Johnson sent him on his way, saying: "Sir, if you give the world a vocabulary of that language, while the island of Great Britain stands in the Atlantic ocean your name will be mentioned". Johnson supported the prospective work with an introduction to the publisher William Strahan.

After having travelled in Scotland and Ireland, Shaw completed and published A Galic and English Dictionary, containing all the Words in the Scottish and Irish Dialects of the Celtic that could be collected from the Voice and Old Books and MSS., 2 vols. London, 1780. On 20 January 1786 he won an action in the court of session against some of the subscribers, who argued that they were not bound to accept the book because it was defective; it was admitted that he "had not fulfilled the terms of his printed proposals". Highlanders had refused to give him information unless paid for it. Shaw had more luck in Ireland, with the result that the work contained strictly Irish words.

In the controversy with James Macpherson (1736–1796) over the authenticity of his Ossian (supposed translations), Shaw sided with Johnson, and published An Enquiry into the Authenticity of the Poems ascribed to Ossian, London, 1781 (Dublin, 1782); a second edition, with a reply to John Clark's answer, was published (London 1782, also Dublin), part of the reply being by Johnson. There followed, in 1784, by A Rejoinder to an Answer from Mr. Clark on the subject of Ossian's Poems. The main thrust of the Enquiry was to argue for the points:

- Macpherson's claimed manuscript sources did not exist;
- While there were Irish epic sources, there were none in the Scottish Highland oral tradition; and
- Macpherson's grasp of Gaelic was slight.

=== Other works ===
Shaw also published:

- Memoirs of the Life and Writing of … Dr. Samuel Johnson, containing many valuable Original Letters, and several interesting anecdotes, both of his literary and social connections. The whole authenticated by living evidence (anon.), London, 1785. Shaw's sources included Thomas Davies, and Johnson himself on his dealings with Thomas Osborne.
- Suggestions respecting a Plan of National Education, with Conjectures on the probable Consequences of non-descript Methodism and Sunday Schools; Bath, 1801.
- The Life of Hannah More, with a Critical Review of her Writings, London, 1802. Under the pseudonym "the Rev. Sir Archibald MacSarcasm, bart." Part of the "Blagdon controversy", the book suggested that some of Hannah More's work should be burned.

== Notes ==
Attribution

This article incorporates text from a publication now in the public domain: Lee, Sidney, ed. (1897). "Shaw, William (1749-1831)". Dictionary of National Biography. Vol. 51. London: Smith, Elder & Co.
