= John Ellor Taylor =

English popular science writer

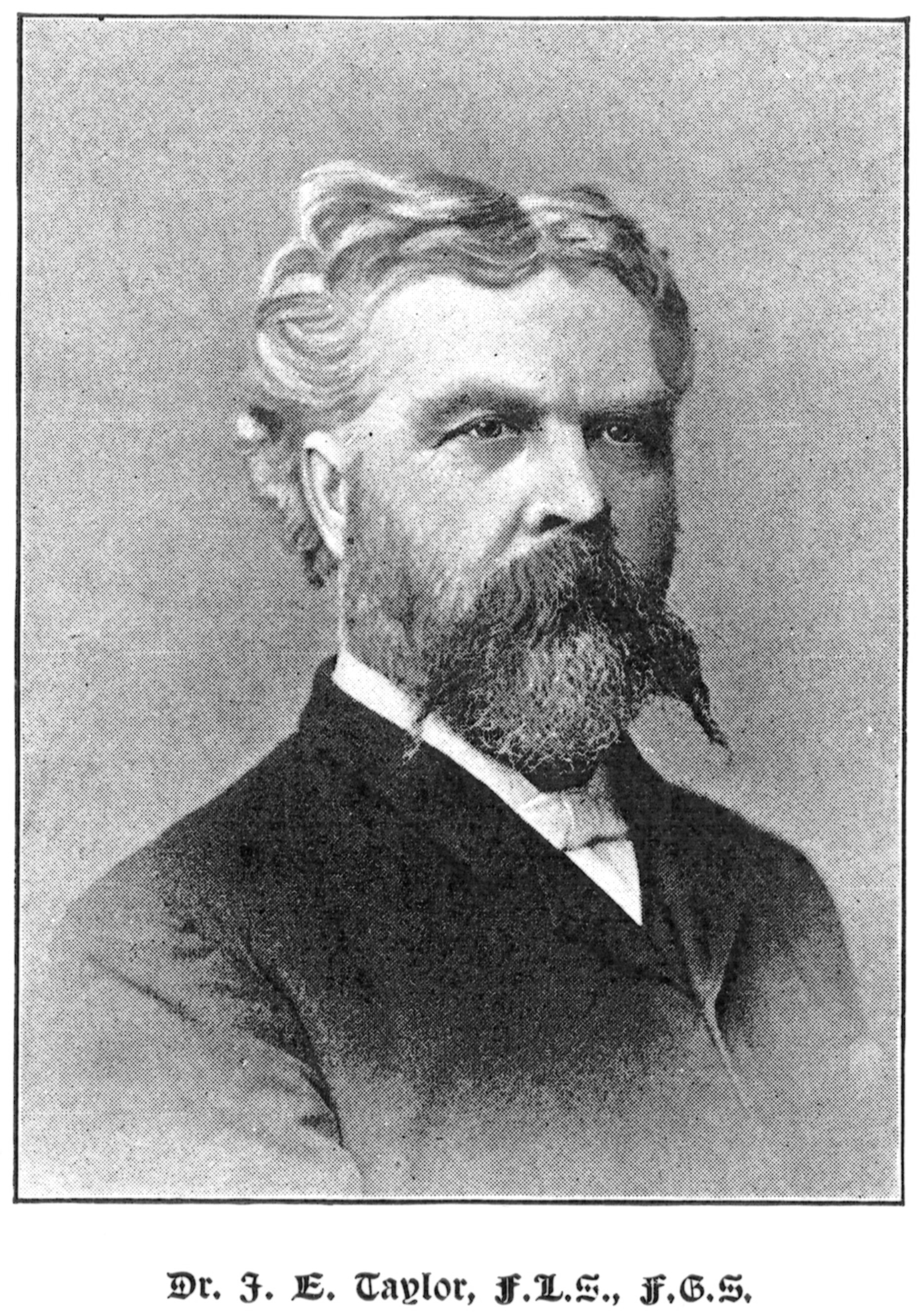
- Pictured in Suffolk Celebrities, 1893
- Born: 1837; Levenshulme, England
- Died: 1895 (aged 57–58); Ipswich, England
- Occupation(s): Science writer, journalist, museum curator

John Ellor Taylor (1837, Levenshulme, England–1895, Ipswich, England) was an English popular science writer, journalist and museum curator.

== Early life ==
The eldest son of William Taylor (died 1864), foreman in a Lancashire cotton-factory, and his wife Maria (born Ellor), he was born at Levenshulme, near Manchester, on 21 September 1837. He received no education except some desultory instruction at a school held in the Wesleyan chapel, which he supplemented by private study. About 1850 he obtained a situation as store-boy at the locomotive works of the London and North-Western Railway at Longsight. Two years later he was bound apprentice as a fitter and turner at the same works. Encouraged by the locomotive superintendent, John Ramsbottom, Taylor applied himself to Latin, Greek, and the natural sciences, and when seventeen began to attend evening classes at the Manchester Mechanics' Institute. A year later he became lay preacher for the Wesleyans, but on account of his scientific opinions he had to abandon his notion of becoming a minister.

== Career ==
After a brief stay in the engineer draughtsman's office at the LNWR Crewe works, he obtained in 1863 a position as sub-editor on the Norwich Mercury under Richard Noverre Bacon. Subsequently he became editor of the Norwich People's Journal, or People's Weekly Journal, an offshoot of the Mercury, and under him the Journal became a success.

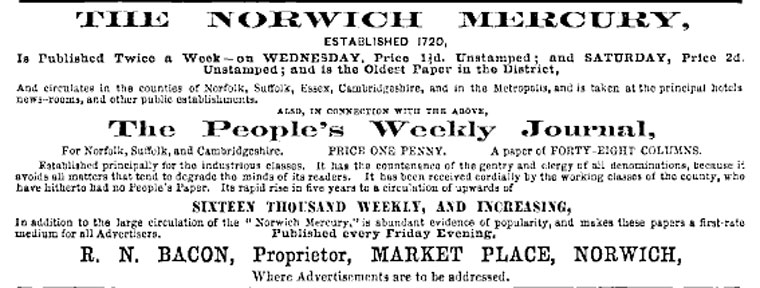
1869 advertisement mentioning the People's Weekly Journal.

From 1858 onwards Taylor was a popular lecturer on science. In conjunction with John Gunn he established the Norwich Geological Society in 1864. In 1869 Taylor was elected to the Geological Society and also founded the Ipswich Science Gossip Society. The following year he founded a second Science Gossip Society in Norwich. In 1872 he was appointed by Ipswich Corporation as curator of the Ipswich Museum. Fellowship of the Linnean Society was granted in June 1873. The duties of this post included the delivery of lectures. He also lectured in many parts of the country, and went on a lecturing tour in Australia during 1885. His book The Sagacity and Morality of Plants, published in 1884 argued for plant intelligence.

With failing health, Taylor found himself in financial difficulties and was compelled to resign his post in 1893. He died in Ipswich on 28 September 1895. He married on 22 January 1867, at Stoke Holy Cross, Sarah Harriet, youngest daughter of William Bellamy, headmaster of the boys' model school, Norwich.

== Selected publications ==
Taylor was author of works on scientific subjects of a popular character. They include:

- Geological Essays, and Sketch of the Geology of Manchester, London, 1864.
- Half-hours at the Seaside, London, 1872; other editions in 1878 and 1890.
- Half-hours in the Green Lanes, London, 1872; 7th edit. 1890.
- Mountain and Moor, for the series entitled Natural History Rambles, London, 1879.
- The Aquarium: its Inhabitants, London, 1876; 2nd edit. 1881.
- The Sagacity and Morality of Plants, London 1884.
- Our Island Continent: a Naturalist's Holiday in Australia, London, 1886.
- In and About Ancient Ipswich London: Jarrold & Sons, 1888

He was also editor of Hardwicke's Science Gossip, to which he contributed, from 1872 to 1893, and wrote some twelve papers, mostly on geological subjects, that appeared in scientific journals between 1865 and 1883. He frequently sent articles to the Australasian and other periodicals.

Attribution

- Woodward, Bernard Barham (1898). "Taylor, John Ellor" . In Lee, Sidney (ed.). Dictionary of National Biography. Vol. 55. London: Smith, Elder & Co. "[Proc. Linn. Soc. 1872–3, p. xlviii; Science Gossip, new ser. ii. 210, with portrait; information kindly supplied by his brother William and his daughter Maud Taylor; East Anglian Daily Times, 30 Sept. 1895; Brit. Mus. Cat.; Roy. Soc. Cat.]"
