= Richard Mackenzie Bacon =

English journalist, newspaper proprietor, printer, musician, teacher and writer

Richard Mackenzie Bacon (1776–1844) was an English Whig journalist, newspaper proprietor, printer, musician, teacher, and writer.

== Life ==
He was born in the parish of St Peter Mancroft Norwich 1 May 1776 the only son of Richard Bacon (1745-1812), a printer and proprietor of the Norwich Mercury, one of the leading provincial Whig newspapers. He was educated at the Norwich grammar school and joined his father’s business in 1794.

== Family ==
Bacon married Jane Louisa Noverre in 1797 (d.1808). She was the daughter of Augustine Noverre, a French dancer who came to England in 1775. Of their children:

- Richard Noverre Bacon, the eldest, (died 1884), edited the Norwich Mercury;
- Louisa Mary Bacon was known as an educational writer;
- Mary Anne Bacon wrote on music;
- George Peter Bacon edited the Sussex Advertiser;
- Jane Bacon was known as a mezzo-soprano;
- Rose Bacon was a musician.

Jane Louisa died in 1808, and the September 1809 he married Margaret Gilbert Burks, the daughter of John G. Burks.

From 1805 Bacon served in the Norwich Rifle Volunteers, retiring with the rank of Major when the Corps was disbanded. He died 27 November 1844 at his home at Costessey, near Norwich.

== Printer ==
Bacon became a freeman of Norwich, by patrimony, 20 October 1798 and in September 1799 registered four printing presses. He was the manager of the printing department of his father's business until September 1804, when he became proprietor. However his name began to appear on the imprints of locally published books from 1802, and continued to do so until 1810. Thereafter, the printing firm becomes Bacon, Kinnebrook & Co. (1811-1836) and Bacon, Kinnebrook & Bacon, until 1844.

In 1813 Bacon and Bryan Donkin obtained a patent for improvements in printing, from types, from blocks, or plates. In the Norwich Mercury of 30 November 1814 is a prospectus of Bacon's printing machine, with an account of the progress it had then made. The invention was praised in the article "Printing" in Rees's Cyclopædia (1819).

== Newspaper proprietor/editor ==
In September 1804 took over responsibility for publishing and editing the Norwich Mercury from his father, and continued as both editor and a major contributor until his death in 1844. However, the losses incurred with Taverham Mill forced him to take a partner, William Kinnebrook, in the ownership of the paper in 1811. The partnership was joined by his son Richard Noverre Bacon in 1836.

== Papermaker ==
Bacon went into partnership with John Gilbert and Francis Noverre (his brother-in-law) in the running of Taverham paper mill, .and in 1807, they installed a Fourdrinier machine. The venture was unsuccessful, and the partnership was dissolved in 1812. Likewise a partnership with his father-in-law John G. Burks was also dissolved in 1812. Bacon continued in partnership with Simon Wilkin until 29 August 1816 when the partnership of Bacon and Wilkin was declared bankrupt.

== Musician and music journalist ==
Bacon was the proprietor and projector of the Quarterly Musical Magazine and Review, which he began to publish in London in 1818, and continued to edit until 1828. It was mainly owing to his efforts that the Norwich Musical Festival was established. William Chappell remarked on his knowledge of traditional songs.

== Political interests ==
Bacon corresponded with the radical Edward Harbord, 3rd Baron Suffield. In 1831 he wrote an open letter supporting a reform bill, but he opposed dividing the Norfolk constituency.

== Works ==
His main works are:

- Life of Pitt, Norwich, 1806.
- Pamphlet relative to the Regular, the Militia, and the Volunteer Forces, in reply to the Right Hon. William Windham, Ipswich, 1806.
- Independent Remarks on the Queen's Case, Norwich, 1820.
- Reply to Mr. Cobbett, Norwich, 1822.
- Address to the People on Stack-burning, 1822.
- Elements of Vocal Science, being a philosophical inquiry into some of the principles of singing,'London, 1824.
- Letter to Edward, Lord Suffield, upon the Distress of the Labourers and its Remedy, London and Norwich, 1831.
- Letters to the Viscount Stormont and Sir James Scarlett, Knt., on the bribery and corruption practised at the Norwich election, London and Norwich, 1831.
- A Memoir of the Life of Edward, third Baron Suffield, Norwich, 1838 (privately printed).
- A Musical Dictionary, unpublished.
