= Marianne Francis =

English evangelical (1790–1832)

Marianne Francis (1790–1832) was an English evangelical, now known principally as a correspondent of Hester Piozzi and Sarah Wesley. She has been called an "evangelical bluestocking", and is recognised as a significant participant in debate about religious enthusiasm.

== Early life ==
She was the daughter of Clement Francis (died 1792), a physician and medical writer, and his wife Charlotte Ann Burney, daughter of Charles Burney and sister of Frances Burney. Her mother married, secondly, in 1798, Ralph Broome (1742–1805), against her father's wishes.

Marianne early studied Latin, Greek, Hebrew and Arabic early. She showed mathematical ability, and undertook a wide course of reading. She wrote hymns, at least from age ten. She "impressed all she knew by her linguistic ability, learning, and brilliant performances on the pianoforte." Charles Burney, himself a musician, wrote to his daughter Frances that Marianne was a "marvellous performer":

She may perhaps be styled a Bravura performer. But her courage & persistence in attacking difficulties of all kinds, is unparalleled, so that in spite of my civility to her countenance, I pronounce her to be—a monster.

In Bath in 1805, Marianne met Hester Piozzi, and an extensive correspondence ensued. The Francis family shortly moved to Exmouth, in 1806, and kept in touch. Marianne's diaries 1803–9, and 1820–1, are extant.

== Wilberforce and Young ==
Introduced to William Wilberforce at Gore House, Marianne became a classical tutor and secretary in the family, and came to know the Clapham Sect more generally, including the Thornton family. She told Barbara Wilberforce (1799–1821), daughter of the house and a reluctant pianist, that "you may, by practising an hour a day be able to manage a hymn & any simple melodies" without a musician's dedication.

Her mother's life was now itinerant: to Richmond, Surrey, to stay with her daughter Charlotte Barrett; at Brighton for the sea air; much time on the continent of Europe with her invalid son Clement who had become a Fellow of Gonville and Caius College, Cambridge. This nomadic existence, however, did not suit Marianne.

In early 1811 Marianne underwent painful eye treatment in London under Wathen Phipps, and Piozzi's friend Sir William Pepys, 1st Baronet, kept her company as she recovered. Later that year, she went with her mother on a visit to Bradfield Hall, Essex, with the aging Arthur Young; a close friendship resulted with Young, who died in 1820. She acted as secretary to Young, who suffered from cataract, and lost his sight. An account of the Bradfield Hall household when Marianne was a visitor, sleeping over the servant's hall, including Young's French secretary St Croix, was given by Young's daughter in a letter of 1814.

Young's son the Rev. Arthur Young (1769–1827) owned an estate in the Crimea, near Kaffa, and in June 1817 Young told Francis he had heard from him. A month or so later Lewis Way enquired of Young about the estate, Karagos, as a potential community for Jewish converts to Christianity. Francis visited the Poune's Court synagogue in Brighton, for Yom Kippur (20 September 1817). In a letter of February 1818 to Piozzi, she gave an account of Hebrew tuition she had there from a German Jew named Fishel, whom she asked to read the New Testament.

Francis engaged in Wilberforce's philanthropic work with the poor. She taught in charity schools, including Young's near Bradfield Hall, where she introduced the monitorial system; she visited workhouses and prisons.

== Later life ==
Marianne Francis had religious views in common with her cousin Frances (Fanny) Raper, who followed "enthusiastic" and Irvingite preachers; her own mother and sister came to think she took too much account of Irvingite views, and wished to include them. She predeceased her mother, dying on 15 March 1832, aged 42.

== "Evangelical bluestockings" ==
It has been noted of the literary circle around Sarah Wesley, of which Marianne Francis was a member, that they circulated writings privately, rather than published them. Others in the group were Elizabeth Benger, Agnes Bulmer, Maria Spilsbury and Mary Tighe. They debated in particular "whether or not religious enthusiasm, properly regulated, had a place in social and religious life and particularly whether women had a role in securing this place."

== Correspondence ==
- An Edition of the Letters of Marianne Francis (1790–1832) to Hester Lynch Piozzi (1741–1821), 1808–10 (1975), editor Diane Menagh. Almost all that survives of the Francis–Piozzi correspondence consists of Marianne's letters to Hester. Hester mentioned Marianne in letters to Thomas Sedgwick Whalley, including a conversation of Marianne with Hannah More at Wilberforce's house in 1813.

As part of a larger correspondence between the Burney and Wesley families, Marianne was in touch with both Sarah Wesley and her brother Samuel Wesley.

The Burney Papers collection of New York Public Library holds more than 100 letters from Arthur Young to Marianne. There are also family letters at the NYPL and the British Library, from Marianne to her sister Charlotte Barrett.
