= John Clark (land agent) =

Scottish scholar, writer and land agent

John Clark (died 1807) was a Scottish land agent, Gaelic scholar and writer.

== Life ==
Clark was a Highlander, who was drawn into the controversy over the Ossian poems written by James Macpherson, by a chance meeting. He worked for two decades in Wales, in particular on developing the road system, and was the steward of Viscount Hereford. He died at Pembroke in 1807. He was a Fellow of the Society of Antiquaries of Scotland.

== Works ==
Clark published:

- Works of the Caledonian Bards, Edinburgh, 1778, collection of supposed translations of Highland poems
- An Answer to Mr. Shaw's Inquiry into the Authenticity of the Works of Ossian, Edinburgh, 1781, against William Shaw, who claimed that Clark had admitted to him that his Works was faked.
- In the General View of Agriculture county surveys, reports on Brecknockshire, Radnorshire and Herefordshire for the Board of Agriculture, each in 1794. The Herefordshire survey commented on the prevalence of sunken lanes. For Radnorshire, Clark criticised the conservatism of its farmers.
- The Nature and Value of Leasehold Property, 1808.

== Notes ==
Attribution

This article incorporates text from a publication now in the public domain: Stephen, Leslie, ed. (1887). "Clark, John (d.1807)". Dictionary of National Biography. Vol. 10. London: Smith, Elder & Co.
