= Thomas Batchelor (writer) =

Thomas Batchelor (1775–1838) was an English farmer, writer on dialect, agriculture and poet.

== Life ==
Batchelor was born at Marston Moretaine, Bedfordshire, into a farming family, the son of Joseph Batchelor and his wife Ann Brandon. The Batchelors from 1792 were tenant farmers at Boughton End. The family finances were difficult, and Batchelor, though not highly educated, sought an income from writing. Initially he was a poet, published in The Monthly Mirror in 1801, and with a book Village Scenes appearing in 1804. He wrote agricultural articles under the name "Bedfordshire".

== Language study ==
In studying dialect, Batchelor followed orthoepy, and documented the Great Vowel Shift. He has been praised by Arne Zettersten, in particular for his independence of thought. He did take something from the works of John Walker. He concentrated on the Bedfordshire dialect, publishing in 1807 two works on orthoepy, one concerned with the dialect, bound together. They met with criticism in the Monthly Review, in 1810.

A great-nephew of Thomas Gurney, Batchelor recorded conversations in shorthand, and invented an orthoepical alphabet.

== Surveys for the Board of Agriculture ==
In the General View of Agriculture county surveys, Batchelor published General View of the Agriculture of the County of Bedford (1808). He also worked on Dorset, where his survey was edited and published by William Stevenson (1814).
