= All Saints' Church, Sinnington =

Church in Sinnington, North Yorkshire, England

Coordinates: 54°15′53″N 0°51′20″W

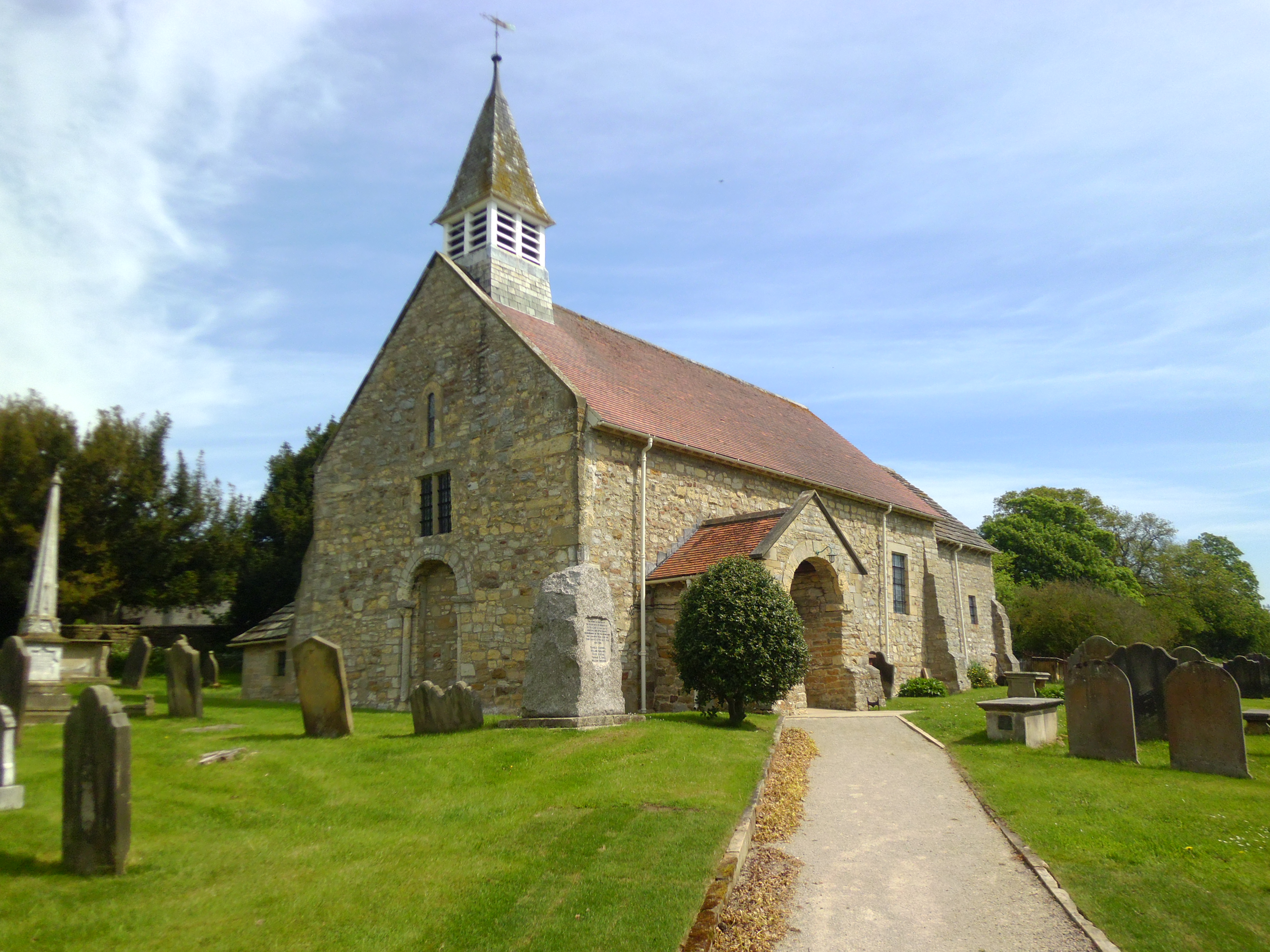
The church, in 2013

All Saints' Church is the parish church of Sinnington, a village in North Yorkshire, in England.

The church was built in the early 12th century, from which period the nave and chancel survive. The porch was added slightly later, but the church was otherwise unchanged until the 17th century, when some of the windows were altered. In 1904, the church was restored by C. Hodgson Fowler, the work including rebuilding the chancel arch, addding a vestry and bellcote, and inserting a new west window. The church was grade II* listed in 1953.

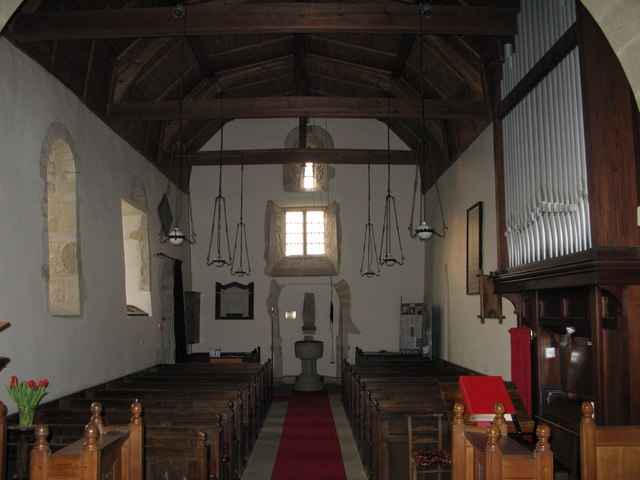
Interior of the church, looking west

The church is built of limestone, incorporating fragments of earlier material, and has roofs of stone flags, slate and tile. The church consists of a nave, a south porch, and a chancel with a vestry, and on the west gable is a bellcote with a sprocketed shingled spirelet and a weathervane. The west doorway is Norman, and has a moulded round arch with attached shafts and scalloped capitals. The south doorway is also Norman, and has a round arch with two orders, and traces of waterleaf on the capitals. Inside, there are two piscinae, and 17th-century wooden pews and altar rails.

== See also ==
- Grade II* listed churches in North Yorkshire (district)
- Listed buildings in Sinnington
