= Nathaniel Kent =

English land valuer and agriculturist

Nathaniel Kent (1737–1810) was an English land valuer and agriculturist.

== Life ==
Nathaniel Kent was baptized in Andover on 8 February 1737, the youngest son of Ambrose Kent and Mary Sylverthorn.

He was first employed in the diplomatic service as secretary to Sir James Porter at Brussels. During his time there he studied the husbandry of the Austrian Netherlands, at that time thought to be the best in Europe. The acquaintance of Benjamin Stillingfleet, the naturalist, was valuable to him.

Kent's published writings brought him employment on a large scale as an estate agent and land valuer, and he worked to improve English methods of land management. His subsequent work in agriculture was mainly in Norfolk, but he also suggested extensive embankments in Lincolnshire, which were successfully carried out. He was for a short time bailiff of George III's farm in the Windsor Great Park.

On 25 Nov 1766, at St. James, Piccadilly, Kent married Miss Ann Powell. Their offspring included:
1) Marianne, baptized at All Saints Fullham on 28 Sept 1769, buried at Buxton, Norfolk, on 21 Mar 1773
2) Sophia, baptized at All Saints Fulham on 10 Oct 1772, married to Charles Adams at St Martin in the Fields, Westminster, on 22 Jan 1803

The widowed Kent married Miss Armine North, granddaughter of Roger North, on 10 April 1783. Their children included:
1) Charles, born 28 May 1784 at Fulham
2) George, born 24 Sep 1787 at Fulham
3) Thomas (grandfather of the poet Armine Thomas Kent and first husband of the second wife of Bishop Charles James Blomfield), born 31 Mar 1790, died 1818
4) Harriet (who married Alexandre T Sampayo in 1820), born 19 Mar 1793, died 1857

Kent died of apoplexy at Fulham, Middlesex, 10 October 1810 and was buried at All Saints Church, Fulham on 16 October.

== Works ==
Some of Kent's letters to Sir James Porter, dated 1765 and 1766. are in the Egerton Manuscripts 2157. Returning to England in 1766, he drew up an account of Flemish husbandry at the request of Sir John Cust, the Speaker of the House of Commons, who persuaded Kent to devote himself to agriculture.

Kent published in 1775 Hints to Gentlemen of Landed Property (3rd edition 1793) with coverage going as far as labourers' cottages. He contributed A General View of the Agriculture of the County of Norfolk to the Survey issued by the Board of Agriculture in 1794 (and supplementary remarks, Norwich, 1796), and papers in Alexander Hunter's Georgical Essays, York, 1803. Details on the king's farm, communicated by him to the Society of Arts in 1798, were subsequently published as a pamphlet.
