= William Marshall (agricultural writer) =

English writer

- Born: 1745; Sinnington
- Died: 1818 (aged 72–73); Pickering, North Riding of Yorkshire
- Resting place: Middleton, Ryedale
- Citizenship: Great Britain
- Known for: Agricultural writing
- Spouse: Elizabeth Hodgeson
- Parent(s): William and Alice Marshall

William Humphrey Marshall (1745–1818) was an 18th-century English writer on contemporary agriculture. He was an early proponent of the establishment of a state-sponsored body to promote improved farming standards and agricultural colleges.

== Early life ==
William Humphrey Marshall was born in 1745 in Sinnington, in North Yorkshire, England. He was the younger son of William and Alice, yeoman farmers. Marshall left home at the age of 14 and worked in commerce in London and the West Indies for fourteen years.

== Intellectual contributions ==
At the age of 28 he had what he thought was a miraculous recovery from illness, and determined to devote himself in future to the study of agriculture. He had already been pursuing the study in his spare time and he thought that the proper area for analysis should be the natural agricultural district rather than the regions demarcated by county boundaries. He also thought that no less than twelve months' personal observation and practical experience of farming in an area was needed before a realistic assessment could be made. This method of research differed from his contemporaries in that others, notably Arthur Young, his great rival, investigated farming practices by cursorily touring a county and interviewing the inhabitants. In pursuit of this belief, in 1774 Marshall rented a farm near Croydon, Surrey, and four years later he published an account of his experiences. Marshall did not, however, have Young's lively writing style and his status as an internationally renowned agricultural expert.

In 1780, Marshall applied for a grant from the Society of Arts to conduct his research in another area of England, but the committee, which included Arthur Young, turned down his request. Instead Marshall found employment as an estate manager first in Norfolk and then Staffordshire to fund his research and writing. Subsequently, he lived and worked in a number of places throughout England. In 1798 he finally completed an ambitious twelve-volume study of England's Rural Economy. He was also employed as a landscape gardener, writing three books on the subject.

When the Board of Agriculture was created in 1793, after years of lobbying by Marshall, the post of Secretary went to Young. Marshall disliked the Board's decision to commission rapid surveys of counties, but contributed the report covering the central Highlands of Scotland. By 1807, he was pursuing his second ambition, a Review and Abstract of the Board's county surveys. This Review, which was in five volumes published over ten years, was critical of the quality of the Board of Agriculture reports. Marshall was scathing about Young, once comparing him to 'superficial charlatans'.

== Personal life ==
He married Elizabeth Hodgson in 1807.

== Death and legacy ==
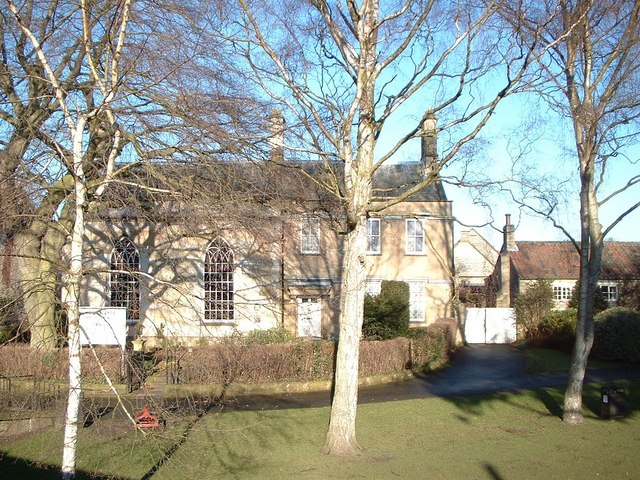
Marshalls home in Pickering, the left side of which was built to be a classroom for his college of agriculture

When he died in 1818, Marshall was building an agricultural college at his home in Pickering, in his native county of Yorkshire. Today, this building houses the Beck Isle Museum of Rural Life, rather a fitting use for this fine Grade II* Listed Building.
