= William Stevenson (Scottish writer) =

William Stevenson (1772–1829) was a Scottish nonconformist preacher, tutor and official, now known as a writer and father of Elizabeth Gaskell.

== Life ==
Stevenson was the son of a captain in the Royal Navy, born at Berwick-upon-Tweed on 26 November 1772. He was educated at the grammar school there under Joseph Romney. In 1787 he entered Daventry Academy as a student for the nonconformist ministry, and in 1789 the academy moved to Northampton, where John Horsey was principal.

After he had spent a short time at Bruges as tutor to an English family, the outbreak of the French Revolutionary Wars in 1792 compelled Stevenson to return to England, where he obtained the post of classical tutor at Manchester Academy. While at Manchester he became an Arian under the influence of Thomas Barnes. For a short time he preached at Dob Lane Chapel, Failsworth, where he was the successor of Lewis Loyd the banker.

Stevenson resigned his posts and went as a pupil to a farmer in East Lothian. In 1797 he took a farm at Saughton, near Edinburgh. There he had James Cleghorn, a friend, as partner, but was less successful. After four or five years he gave up farming, and set up a boarding-house for students in Drummond Street, Edinburgh. In 1806 James Maitland, 8th Earl of Lauderdale invited Stevenson to accompany him to India as private secretary; Lauderdale's bid to become governor-general there then fell through, but he obtained for Stevenson the post of keeper of the records to the Treasury.

Stevenson lived in the neighbourhood of London. Uglow identifies him, in the early 1820s, in the sketch from Recollections of Literary Characters of Katherine Thomson devoted to John Galt, as a taciturn man of letters who was a good listener. He died at his house at Chelsea, on 20 March 1829.

== Works ==
Generally Stevenson was a critic of the political economy of the period, finding it inconsistent and theoretical, lacking experimental foundation. He opposed the thinking of both Thomas Malthus and David Ricardo, against whom he brought up the "heterogeneous labour problem". William Blackwood published Stevenson in his magazine, but found his writing turgid. On economic matters, Blackwood's followed a High Tory line, exemplified by "Christopher North" (John Wilson) and David Robinson as well as John Galt and Stevenson.

Stevenson was the author of:

- Remarks on the very inferior Utility of Classical Learning, London, 1796.
- A System of Land-Surveying, 1805; London, 1810.
- General View of the Agriculture of the County of Surrey, London, 1809.
- General View of the Agriculture of the County of Dorset, London, 1812. This work made extensive use of a survey carried out by Thomas Batchelor.
- Historical Sketch of Discovery, Navigation, and Commerce, Edinburgh and London, 1824. This was taken to be a supplement to Robert Kerr's Voyages and Travels.

Stevenson was editor of the Scots Magazine, to which he contributed essays. He also contributed to the Edinburgh Encyclopædia, wrote the life of William Caxton and other treatises for the Society for the Diffusion of Useful Knowledge, besides writing articles for the Edinburgh Review, the Retrospective Review, and other magazines, and compiling most of the Annual Register for several years.

== Family ==
Stevenson was twice married. By his first wife, Eliza Holland of Sandlebridge in Cheshire, he had two children, a son John and a daughter Elizabeth Cleghorn, who married William Gaskell, and became well known as the novelist Elizabeth Gaskell. Her middle name Cleghorn has often been traced to James Cleghorn; Chapple argues in favour of Robert Cleghorn, friend of Robert Burns, via his wife, also associated with Saughton.

Eliza Stevenson died in 1810, and in 1814 William married Catherine, daughter of Alexander Thomson of Savannah, Georgia. By her he had a son and daughter.
