= Charles Findlater =

Scottish minister

Charles Findlater (10 January 1754 – 28 May 1838) was a Scottish minister, agricultural writer and essayist.

== Life ==
Findlater was born 10 January 1754 in the manse of West Linton, Peeblesshire. His grandfather, Alexander Findlater, was from Moray, and married into the family of Kirkaldy of Grange. Thomas (1697–1778), his son, was minister of West Linton, but his settlement there in 1729 was opposed by certain of the parishioners, and led to the rise of a secessionist congregation.

Charles Findlater was Thomas Findlater's son by his second wife, Jean, daughter of William Brown, an Edinburgh bookseller. He graduated from the University of Edinburgh on 14 November 1770. In 1777 he was ordained assistant to his father, and in 1790 was presented by William Douglas, 4th Duke of Queensberry to the neighbouring parish, Newlands. He lived there until 1835, and then retiring from duty, died at Glasgow 28 May 1838, aged 84. His appointment at Newlands, like his father's at West Linton, was opposed, and led to the establishment of a seceding congregation. On 26 July 1791 he married Janet Hay Russell, who was accidentally burnt to death in 1828. He was father of the synod of Lothian and Tweeddale, and was buried at Newlands. A marble bust of him, funded by subscription, was in the Peebles Art Gallery.

Findlater was an unconventional liberal theologian. He established one of the first local savings banks, and used to carry its account-book when on his pastoral work. He would sing a song at a cottar's wedding, and on wintry Sundays gather his congregation round him in his kitchen and give them dinner afterwards.

== Works ==
Findlater published:

- Liberty and Equality; a Sermon or Essay, with an Appendix on Godwin's system of society in his "Political Justice," 1800. This sermon, preached at Newlands, was directed against the "monstrous doctrine of equality". Some of William Godwin's sympathisers then attacked Findlater, and he hid himself until the Lord Advocate, Sir James Montgomery, was able to appease the outcry. The sermon was dedicated to Montgomery when printed.
- General View of the Agriculture of the County of Peebles, Edinburgh, 1802.
- Sermons or Essays, as the Reader shall chuse to design them, upon Christian Duties, 1830. In these are contained "plain statement" on the principles of political economy.
- Accounts of West Linton and of Newlands in Sinclair's Statistical Account and in the new Statistical Account.
