= Louisa Barwell =

British musician and writer

Louisa Mary Barwell (1800–1885) was an English musician and educational writer.

== Life ==
Louisa Mary Bacon was born in the parish of St Peter Mancroft, Norwich, on 4 March 1800. She was the daughter of Richard Mackenzie Bacon by his wife Jane Louisa (Noverre), who died in 1808. At the age of 18 she assisted her father in the editorship of the Quarterly Musical Magazine and Review. She was known as a talented musician with a fine voice, who could play a score at sight.

She married John Barwell, a wine merchant, at Norwich. She developed a comprehension of physical and mental state of young children. She contributed to the Quarterly Journal of Education from about 1831, anticipating later views and plans of education. Her husband, who shared her interest in child development, was largely instrumental in securing the success of a scheme by which a charity day-school for girls at Norwich was converted into a girls' industrial training-school.

With Philipp Emanuel von Fellenberg, in whose school at Hofwyl near Bern their sons were placed, the Barwells formed a close friendship. In the literary society of Norwich, as portrayed by Harriet Martineau, Mrs. Barwell held an important place. Her closest friend was Lady Noel Byron, whose correspondence with her was constant, and whose papers she arranged, in the later years of Lady Byron's life. She survived her friend nearly a quarter of a century, dying on 2 February 1885, leaving four sons and a daughter.

== Works ==
Her publications were:

- Little Lessons for Little Learners 1833 (in monosyllables; fourteen subsequent editions).
- The Value of Time 1834.
- The Value of Money'1834.
- Little Lessons for Little Learners 2nd series, 1835 (many subsequent editions).
- Sunday Lessons for Little Children, 1834.
- The Elder Brother 1835.
- Edward the Crusader's Son, 2 vols., 1836.
- Remember, or Mamma's Birthday, 1837.
- Nursery Government 1837.
- The Novel Adventures of Tom Thumb the Great, showing how he visited the Insect World and learned much Wisdom 1838.
- Trials of Strength, Moral and Physical 1839.
- The Nursery Maid 1839.
- Companion to the Norwich Polytechnic Exhibition 1840.
- Letters from Hofwyl 1842 (published at Lady Byron's suggestion).
- Gilbert Harland, or Good in Everything 1850.
- Childhood's Hours 1851 (ordered by the queen to be used in the royal nursery).
- Flora's Horticultural Fête 1880 (poem for the benefit of the children's infirmary established at Norwich by her friend Jenny Lind-Goldschmidt).
