= Sinnington =

Village and civil parish in North Yorkshire, England

Coordinates: 54°15′43″N 0°51′32″W

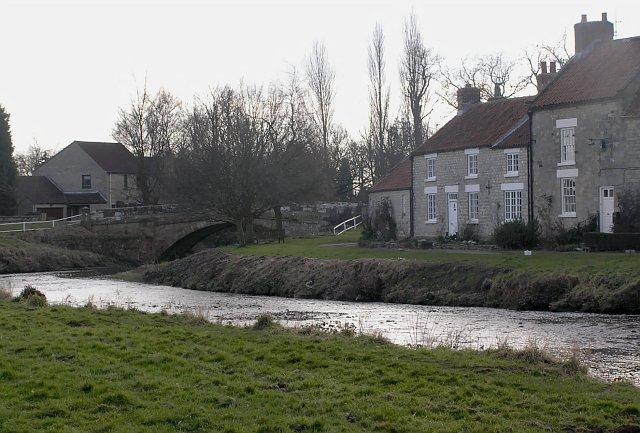
- The bridge across the River Seven at Sinnington

- Location within North Yorkshire
- Population: 287 (2011 census)
- OS grid reference: SE744857
- Civil parish: Sinnington
- Unitary authority: North Yorkshire
- Ceremonial county: North Yorkshire
- Region: Yorkshire and the Humber
- Country: England
- Sovereign state: United Kingdom
- Post town: YORK
- Postcode district: YO62
- Police: North Yorkshire
- Fire: North Yorkshire
- Ambulance: Yorkshire
- UK Parliament: Thirsk and Malton

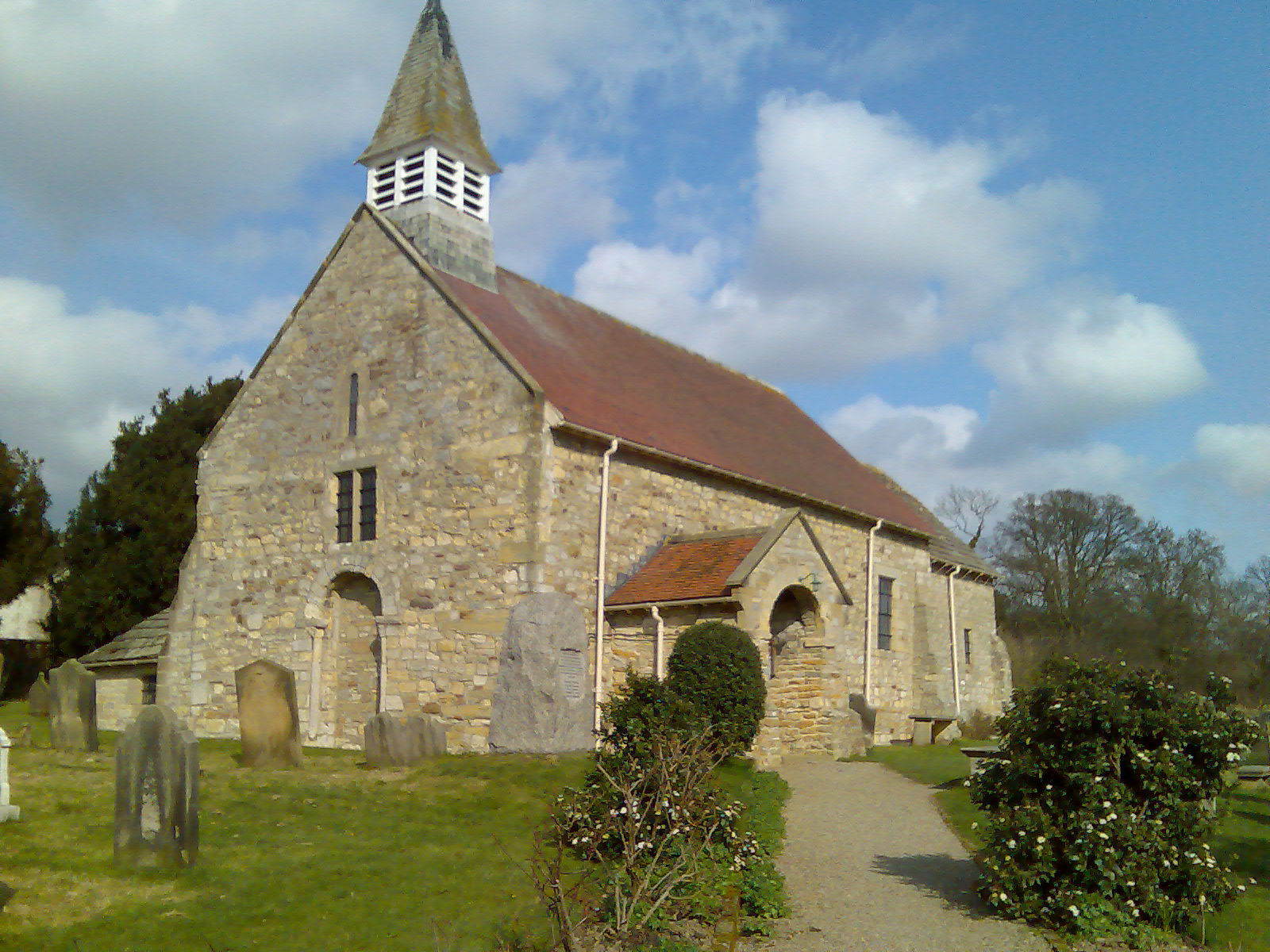
All Saints' Church, Sinnington

Sinnington is a village and civil parish in North Yorkshire, England. It is located on the southern boundary of the North York Moors National Park.

According to the 2001 UK census, the parish has a total population of 318 people living in 148 households, reduced to a population of 287, at the 2011 Census.

The name Sinnington probably derives from the Old English Seveningtūn meaning 'settlement associated with the River Seven'.

The nineteenth century agricultural writer, William Marshall, was born here in 1745. The village was formerly served by a railway station on the Gilling and Pickering (G&P) railway line which opened in 1875 and closed on 31 January 1953 for both passengers and freight.

Typical of the area are the medieval cruck-built longhouses of Sinnington. These were constructed as single storey combined dwelling and beast houses and made of the local Jurassic limestone. Originally they had ling thatched roofs, but they were mostly re-roofed in the 19th century with grey slate or red pantiles. All Saints' Church, Sinnington, has in its fabric an assemblage of dozens of fragments of pre-Norman crosses and hogback fragments scattered all over the building, inside and out. It appears that several - perhaps the numbers even reach double figures - significant crosses were broken up in order to provide building stone for the twelfth-century workers who built the church.

Catherine Parr was resident in the manor of Sinnington, as Lady Latimer, between 1534 and 1543. She was the second wife of John Neville, 3rd Baron Latimer. The manor in nearby Nunnington was owned by her brother William Parr.

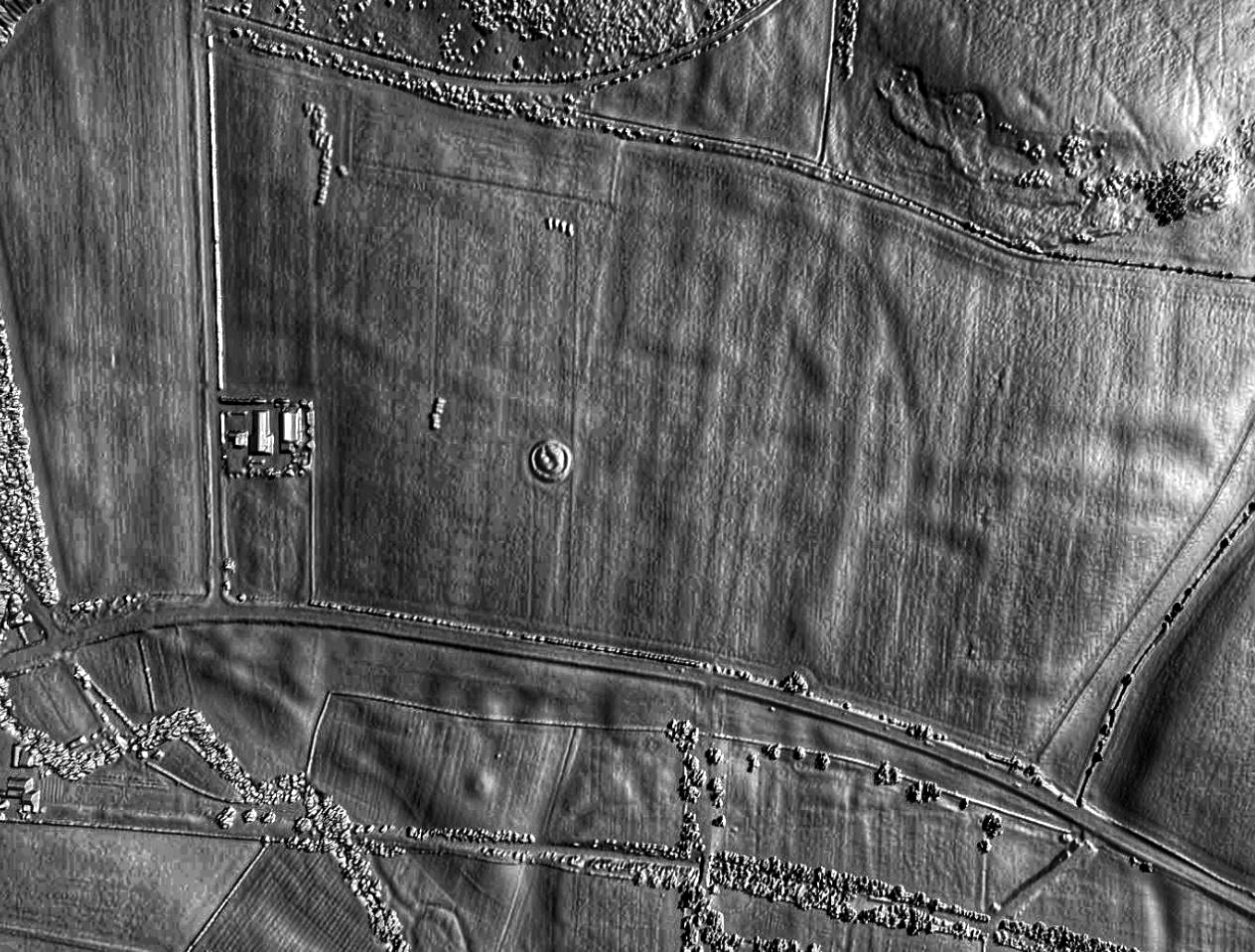
A lidar view of Sinnington Bronze Age round barrow which is located in a barrow cemetery

== Governance ==
An electoral ward in the same name exists. This ward stretches south to Brawby with a total population taken at the 2011 census of 1,685.

The village was part of the Ryedale district from 1974 and 2023. It is now administered by North Yorkshire Council.

== See also ==
- Listed buildings in Sinnington
