= Arthur Young (agriculturist) =

English writer on agriculture (1741–1820)

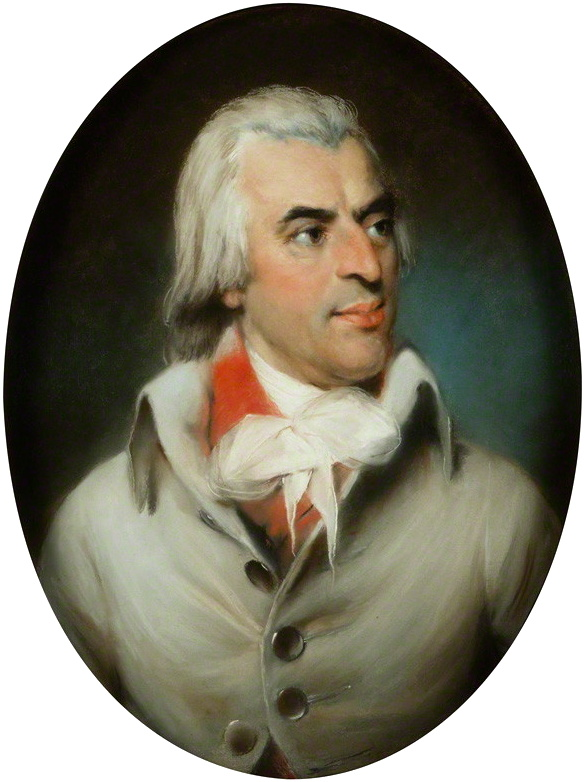
- Arthur Young, by John Russell, 1794
- Born: 11 September 1741; Whitehall, London
- Died: 12 April 1820 (aged 78); Sackville Street, London
- Occupations: Writer on agriculture, economics, and social statistics

Arthur Young FRS (11 September 1741 – 12 April 1820) was an English agriculturist. Not himself successful as a farmer, he built on connections and activities as a publicist a substantial reputation as an expert on agricultural improvement. After the French Revolution of 1789, his views on its politics carried weight as an informed observer, and he became an important opponent of British reformers.

Young is considered a major English writer on agriculture and an early contributor to agricultural economics, although he is best known as a social and political observer. Also read widely were his Tour in Ireland (1780) and Travels in France (1792).

== Early life ==
Young was born in 1741 at Whitehall, London, the second son of Anna Lucretia Coussmaker, and her husband Arthur Young, who was rector of Bradfield Combust in Suffolk and chaplain to Arthur Onslow. After attending school at Lavenham from 1748, he was in 1758 placed at Messrs Robertson, a mercantile house in King's Lynn. His sister Elizabeth Mary, who married John Thomlinson in 1758, died the next year, which disrupted the plan for Young to work at Messrs Thomlinson in London, under his sisters in-law.

Young's father also died in 1759. In 1761 Young went to London and the following year started a magazine entitled The Universal Museum. It ran to five numbers, edited by Young, who recruited William Kenrick, just out of King's Bench Prison. It was then sold to a consortium of booksellers, according to initial advice from Samuel Johnson, who wanted no part of it. Young suffered from lung disease from 1761 to 1763, and turned down the offer of a post as a cavalry officer from Sir Charles Howard. Young's mother then put him in charge of the family estate at Bradfield Hall, a small property encumbered with debt. Between 1763 and 1766 he concentrated on farming there.

In 1764–1765 Young met and became a friend of Walter Harte, who published his Essays on Husbandry in 1764. Harte advised him to give up writing for periodicals. He then collected works by Henri-Louis Duhamel du Monceau, Samuel Hartlib and Jethro Tull, as well as reading Harte. He contributed eleven articles to the Museum Rusticum from 1764 to 1765.

== Farmer and writer ==
In 1767 Young took over a farm in Essex, at Sampford Hall, one reason being to move away from his mother, who was on bad terms with his wife. For financial reasons he had to move on in 1768 to Bradmore Farm, North Mymms, in Hertfordshire. There he engaged in experiments described in A Course of Experimental Agriculture (1770). Though these were generally unsuccessful, they gave him a working knowledge of agriculture. He acted as parliamentary reporter for the London Morning Post from 1773.

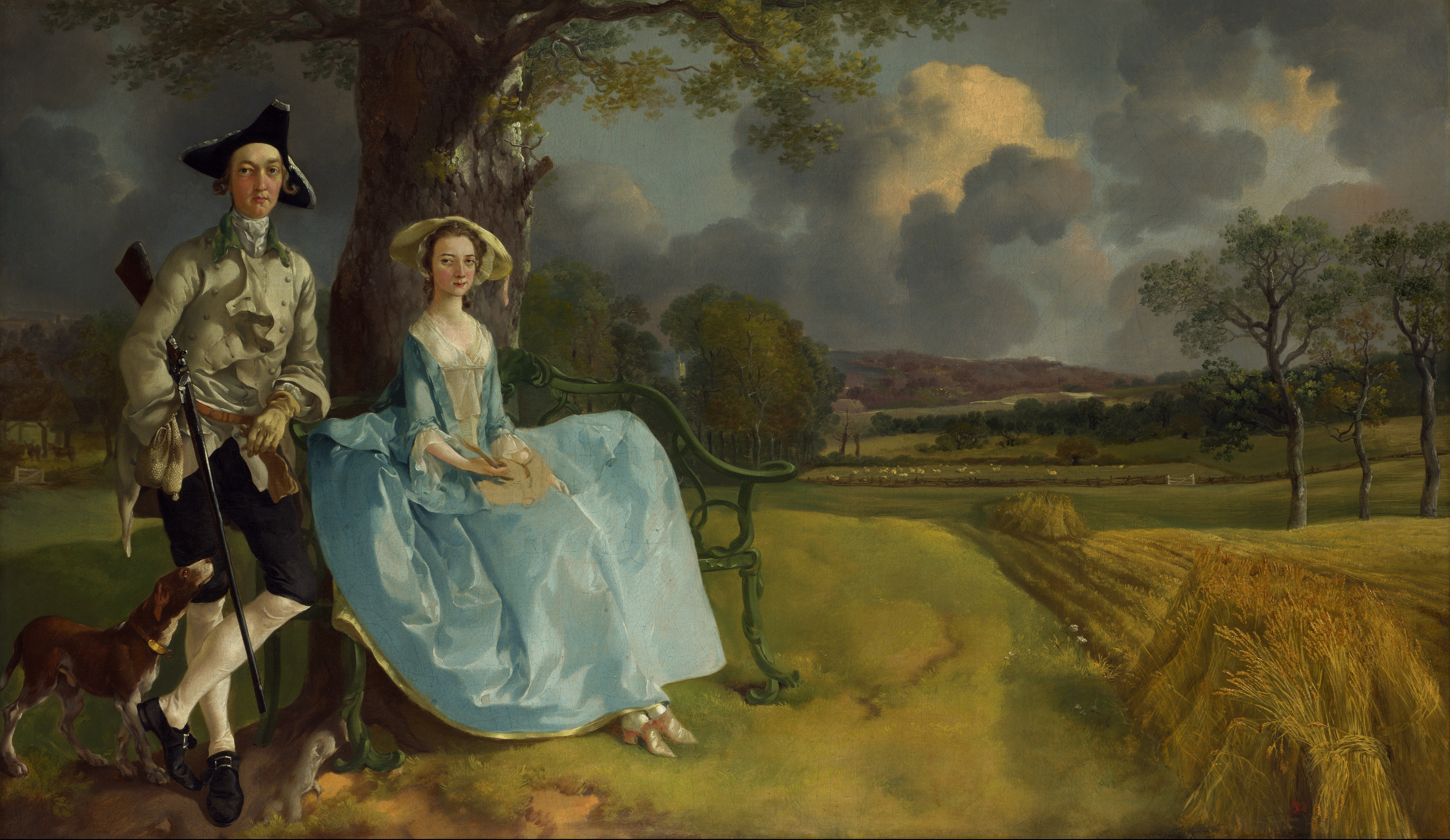
Robert Andrews, considered for his farming a model landowner by Young, with his wife, in a double portrait by Thomas Gainsborough (c. 1750)

Young was elected a Fellow of the Royal Society in 1774; but the Society refused a number of his papers on agricultural topics, which always had critics, such as James Anderson of Hermiston. In 1784 Young began the publication of the Annals of Agriculture, which ran for 45 volumes: contributors included King George III, writing under the pseudonym "Ralph Robinson", and Robert Andrews, whom Young took as a model farmer. Young's figures for the total area of England and Wales, and total cultivated area, were serious overestimates. In a work from 1799, during wartime and fiscal strain on the national budget, Henry Beeke gave more reliable figures, showing Young had erred.

Young was appointed secretary of the Board of Agriculture in 1793, just after it was formed under the presidency of Sir John Sinclair. In that capacity he worked on collecting and preparing the General View of Agriculture county surveys. The Annals of Agriculture began to wind down in 1803, when John Rackham of Bury St Edmunds, who printed it, found copy was lacking and pressed Young, who padded out the pages with old notes. Richard Phillips took it on for volume 41, and saw the publication out, the final volume 45 appearing in 1808.

Economic historians Robert C. Allen and Cormac Ó Gráda have challenged some of Young's conclusions.

== Travel writer ==
Young began a series of journeys through England and Wales, which he described in books that appeared from 1768 to 1770: A Six Weeks' Tour through the Southern Counties of England and Wales; A Six Months' Tour through the North of England and the Farmer's Tour through the East of England. He claimed that these contained the only first-hand information on the rentals, produce and stock of England. They were favourably received and widely translated.

He toured the Kingdom of Ireland in 1776–1777, publishing his Tour in Ireland in 1780. The book was republished in 1897 and 1925, but with much of Young's social detail removed. The full text was republished in 1892 as "Arthur Young's Tour in Ireland (1776–1779)" by Arthur Hutton.

Young's first visit to France was in 1787. Travelling all over the country annually from 1787 to 1789 (around the start of the French Revolution) he described the condition of the people and the conduct of public affairs at a critical juncture. His Travels in France appeared in one large quarto volume in 1792, reprinted in two octavo volumes (Dublin, 1793) and in an enlarged second edition in two quarto volumes (London, 1794).

== On the French Revolution ==
An eye-witness to the French Revolution as one who was welcomed into the company of the highest levels of the French nobility (including the King and Queen) at the time of the fall of the Bastille in 1789, Young by 1792 had become an opponent of its violence and modified his reforming views on English politics. Seeing the burned châteaux at Besançon, he was shocked by the provincial disorders, as he had been by the chaotic debates of the National Assembly (for which he recommended John Hatsell's book on procedure). He and William Windham aligned themselves with Edmund Burke's views expressed in Reflections on the Revolution in France (1790), in Young's Plain and Earnest Address to Britons of November 1792. This was endorsed by the loyalist Association for Preserving Liberty and Property against Republicans and Levellers. In 1793 he opposed Charles Grey's reform motion in Parliament and wrote Example of France a Warning to Britain.

Still in 1793, Young played a role in recruiting the Suffolk Yeomanry, by pulling together local groups of cavalry volunteers. The formation actually took place in 1794, although a cap-badge date of 1793 was later adopted. He joined with the radical Capel Lofft of Troston Hall in a proposal for a Suffolk ship-of-war to be supported by subscription.

Young returned to the subject of reform in 1798 with An Enquiry into the State of Mind Amongst the Lowest Classes. He had attained a formidable position as commentator and used it to call attention to urban unrest and the influence of Tom Paine.

== Associations ==
Young's closest friend was John Symonds, a Cambridge academic, who became involved in his writing as editor. Frederick Hervey, 4th Earl of Bristol in 1782 held weekly Thursday dinners at Ickworth for Symonds, Young and others.

In the late 1780s the export of wool became contentious, but Young combined forces with Sir Joseph Banks in opposing restrictions on this. James Oakes of Bury St Edmunds, a yarn dealer, was a friend of both Symonds and Young. In the wool controversy, Oakes was on the other side from Young, who argued that restricting the export of wool was against the interests of landowners, while Oakes wished to see the price of wool to spinners fall.

A tour by Young was typically preceded by newspaper publicity and consisted of social meetings with prominent farmers and agricultural improvers. One in south-west England in 1796 led to an acquaintance with Sir Francis Buller, 1st Baronet, a judge and improver at Princetown on Dartmoor. Buller corresponded with Young on agricultural matters. The relationship later became awkward, however, when Young's son, the Rev. Arthur Young, was suspected of jury tampering in the trial the United Irishman Arthur O'Connor, on the basis of a letter to Gamaliel Lloyd of Bury St Edmunds, a radical. Buller and the attorney-general took a belligerent attitude to the allegations, when the letter was read out in court.

== Final years ==
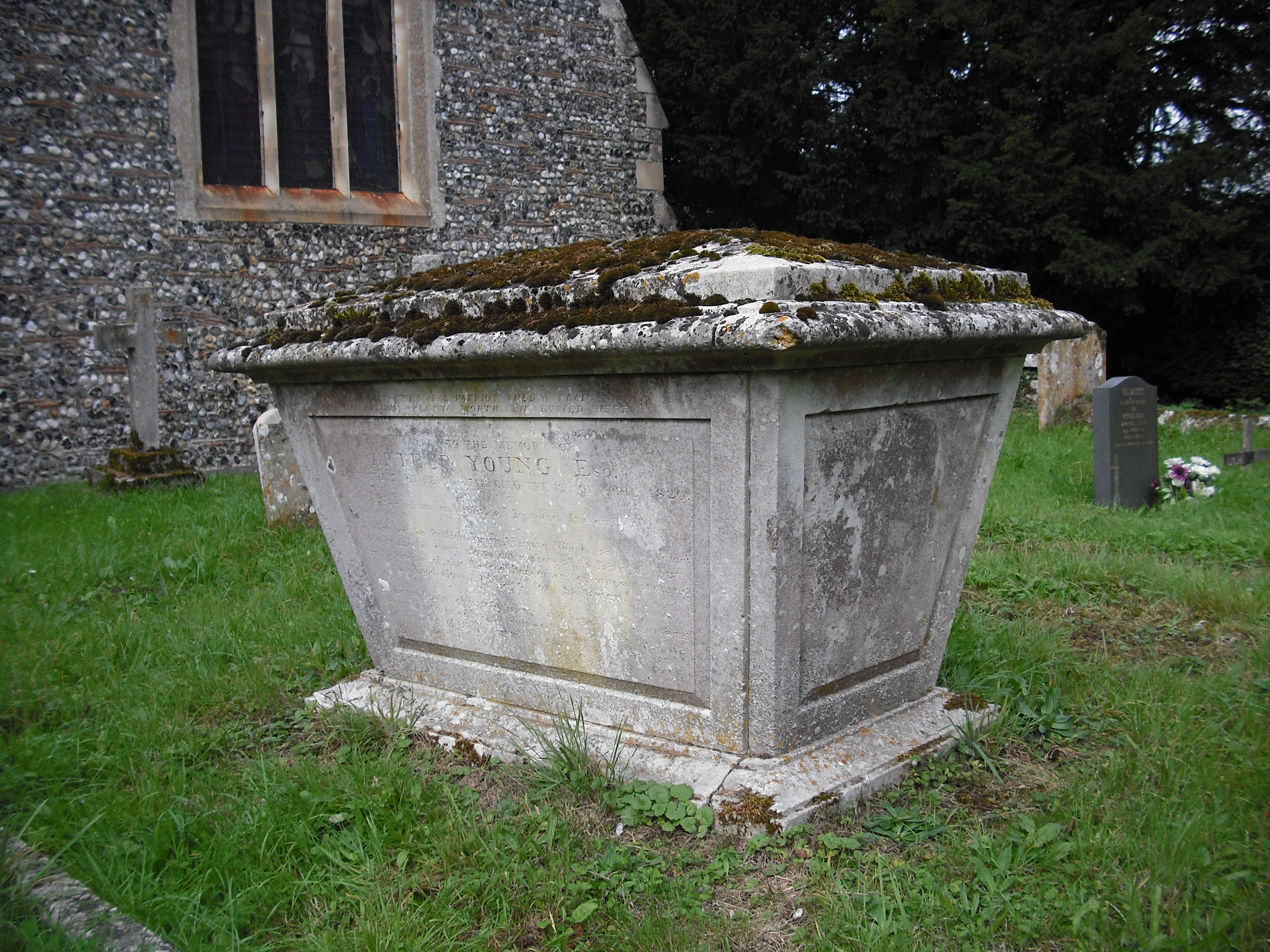
Young's tomb at All Saints' Church, Bradfield Combust

From 1801, Young followed the evangelical teaching of Thomas Scott at the London Lock Chapel, and was influenced by Charles Simeon. In 1809 he became a correspondent, living abroad, of the Royal Institute of the Netherlands. In 1811 he became firm friends with Marianne Francis (1790–1832) a niece of Frances Burney, who shared his commitment to evangelical Christianity. His sight, however, was failing, and in that year he had an operation for a cataract, which proved unsuccessful, leaving him blind.

Young continued to publish pamphlets. He died in Sackville Street, London on 12 April 1820, aged 78, after a painful illness caused by bladder calculus, and was buried at Bradfield Combust church, where his tomb, in sarcophagus form, is inscribed, "Let every real patriot shed a tear, For genius, talent, worth, lie buried here." The tomb is a designated Grade II listed structure. He left an autobiography in manuscript, which was edited (1898) by Matilda Betham-Edwards.

== Legacy ==
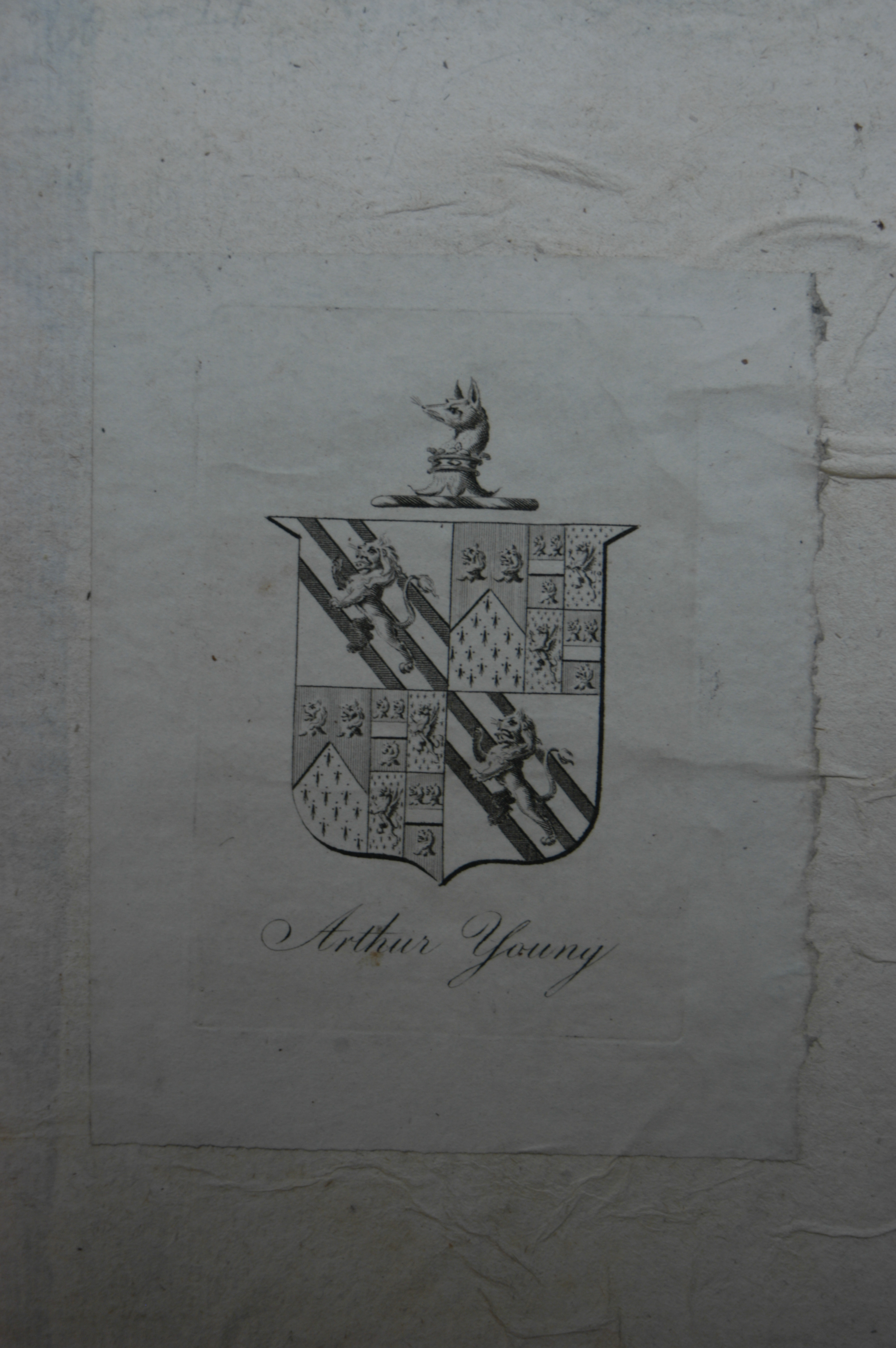
One of Arthur Young's bookplates in a Royal Agricultural Society of England book

Young influenced contemporary observers of economic and social life, such as Frederick Morton Eden and Sir John Sinclair. He was influential too on the American improver John Beale Bordley.

More recently Young has been studied for his methods of investigation. Richard Stone (1997) presents him as a pioneer national income statistician, continuing the work of Gregory King, who had lived a century before. Young produced three estimates of the national income of England: in his Tour through the North of England, Farmer's Tour through the East of England and Political Arithmetic. Brunt (2001) emphasises how Young collected his information, and presents him as a pioneer of sample surveys.

== Works ==
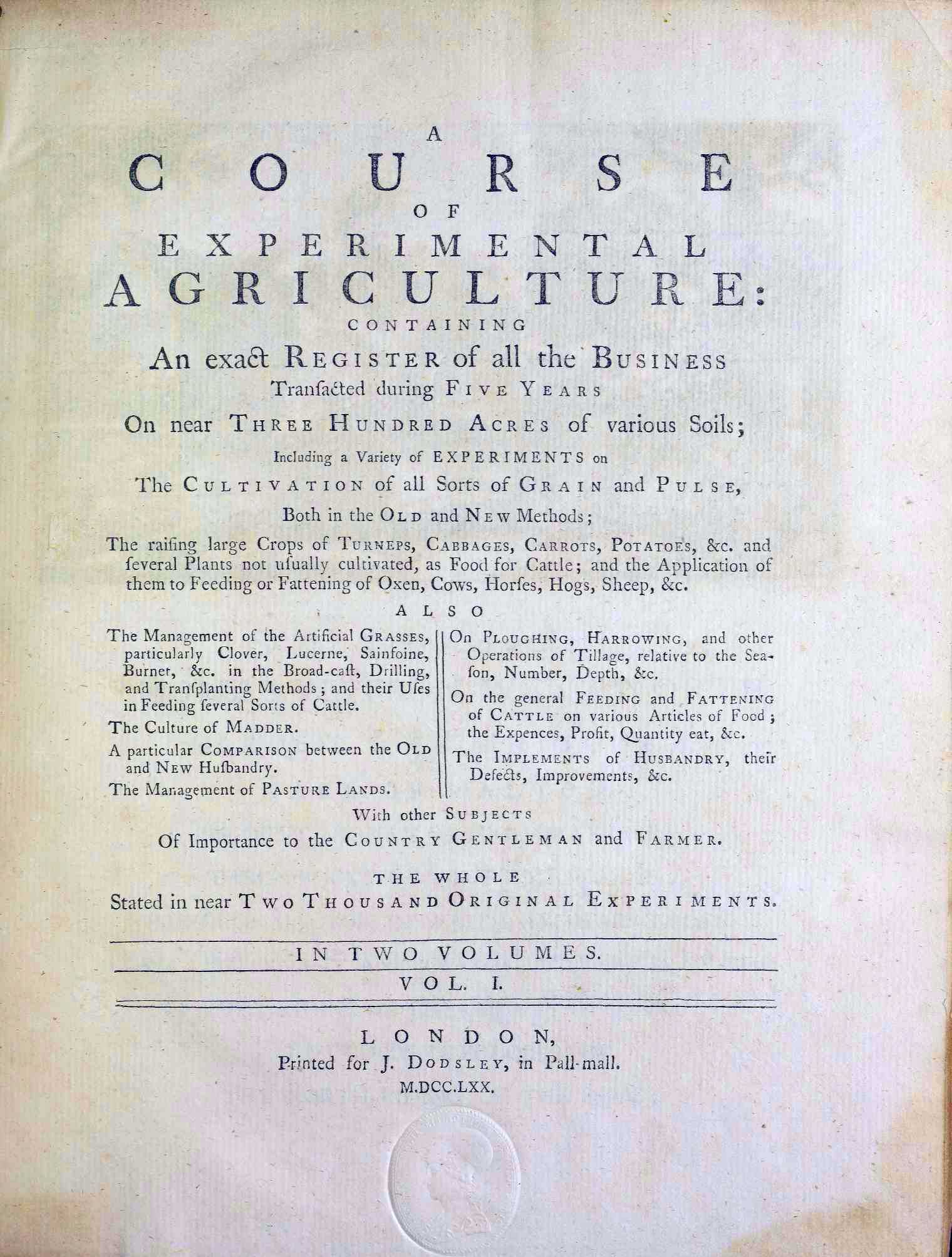
Course of experimental agriculture, 1770

Young built a reputation on the views he expressed as an agricultural improver, a political economist and a social observer. At the age of 17, he published a pamphlet On the War in North America. He also wrote four early novels, and Reflections on the Present State of Affairs at Home and Abroad in 1759. In 1767 he published the Farmer's Letters to the People of England, in 1771 the Farmer's Calendar, which went through many editions, and in 1774 his Political Arithmetic, which was widely translated.

Young produced around 25 books and pamphlets on agriculture and 15 books on political economy, as well as many articles. These include:

- A Six Weeks Tour Through the Southern Counties of England and Wales
- The Farmer’s Letters to the People of England, 1767.
- The farmer's guide in hiring and stocking farms. London, 1770.
- Course of experimental agriculture. Vol. 1. London: James Dodsley. 1770.
- Course of experimental agriculture. Vol. 2. London: James Dodsley. 1770.
- The Farmer’s Calendar, 1771; 1862 edition
- The Farmer's Tour Through the East of England: Being the Register of a Journey Through Various ... 1771
- Political Arithmetic: Containing Observations on the Present State of Great Britain and the Principles of Her Policy in the Encouragement of Agriculture, 1774.
- A Tour in Ireland, 1780. Repr. Blackstaff Press, 1983.
- Annals of Agriculture and other useful Arts. Vol 1 to 45, 1785-1809; Vol. 1, 1785; Vol. 8, 1787; Vol. 10, 1799; Vol. 17, 1792, Vol. 22, 1794; Vol. 32, 1799; Vol. 45, 1808;
- Travels during the years 1787, 1788, & 1789 : undertaken more particularly with a view of ascertaining the cultivation, wealth, resources, and national prosperity of the Kingdom of France, 1792.
- View of the agriculture of Oxfordshire. By the secretary of the Board of agriculture and ... 1809
- The Autobiography of Arthur Young. London, 1898.

The Travels in France were translated into French in 1793–1794 by François Soules; a new version by Henri Lesage with an introduction by Léonce Guilhaud de Lavergne appeared in 1856. The Directory in 1801 ordered Young's writings to be translated in 20 volumes under the title Le Cultivateur anglais.

== Family ==
In 1765 Young married Martha Allen (died 1815), sister-in-law of Charles Burney. Their acute marital strife and Young's devotion to his children were witnessed by Frances Burney and her half-sister Sarah during a visit in 1792. He grieved deeply when his daughter Martha Ann died of consumption on 14 July 1797 at the age of 14, and her loss is said to have turned his mind to religion.
