= Ayton =

Ayton may refer to:

== Places ==
- Ayton, Ontario, Canada
- Ayton, Scottish Borders, Scotland

=== England ===
- Great Ayton, a village and civil parish, near Stokesley, North Yorkshire
- Little Ayton, a village and civil parish, near Stokesley, North Yorkshire
- East Ayton, a village and civil parish, near Scarborough, North Yorkshire
- West Ayton, a village and civil parish, near Scarborough, North Yorkshire

== Other uses ==
- Ayton (surname), a surname (including a list of people with the surname)

== See also ==
- Aiton (disambiguation)
- Ayten (disambiguation)
- Aytoun, a surname
