= Aiton =

Aiton may refer to:

== People ==
- Aiton (surname)
- Standard author abbreviation of William Aiton (1731 – 1793), Scottish botanist

== Places ==
- Aiton, Cluj, a commune in Romania
- Aiton, Savoie, a commune in France

== Other uses ==
- Tai Aiton people, one of the Tai ethnic groups in India
- Tai Aiton language, a language of Assam, India

== See also ==
- Ayton (disambiguation)
- Aytoun
