= Giffordland =

Coordinates: 55.702°N 4.751°W

- Barony
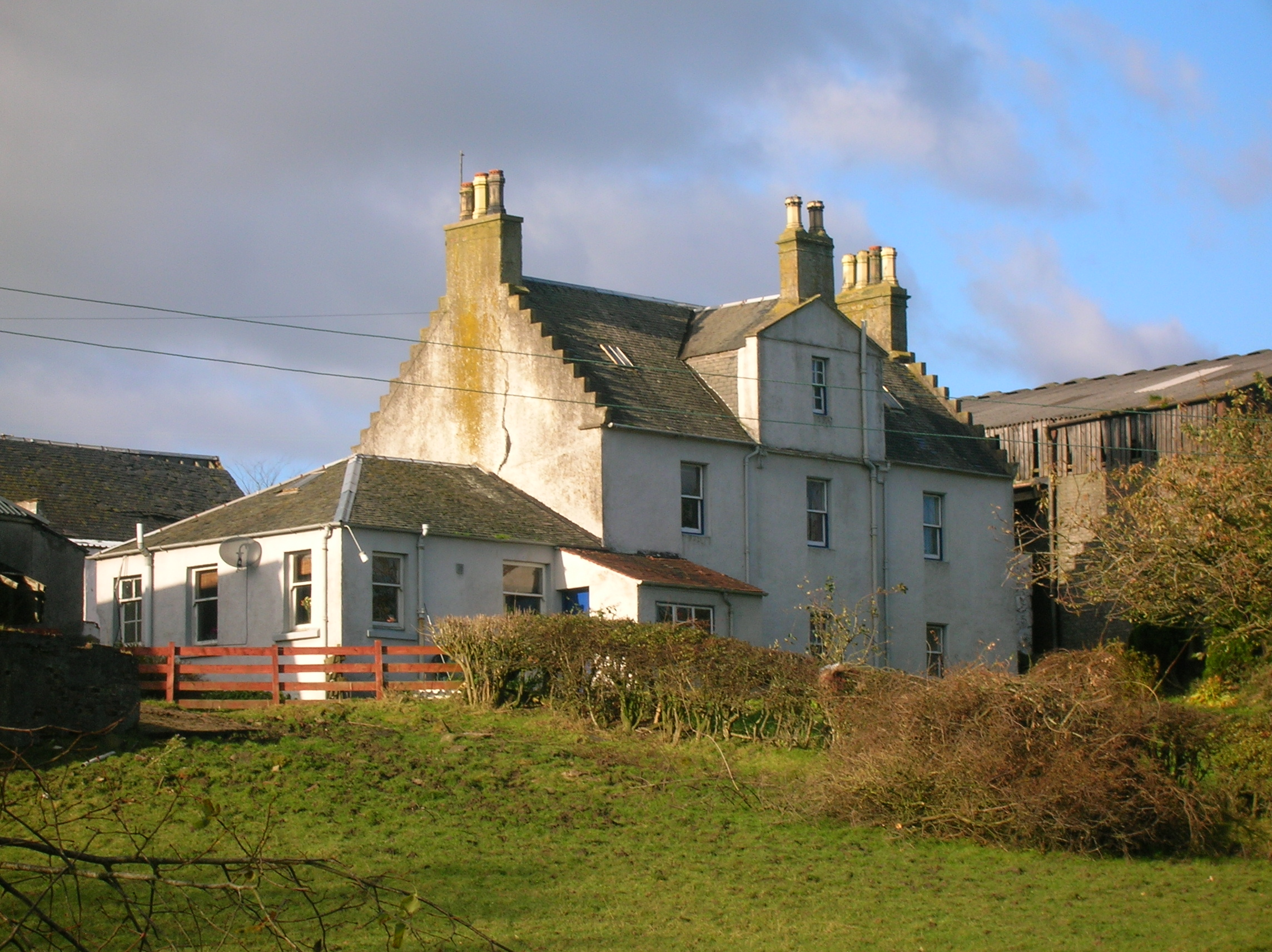
- Giffordland Farmhouse with 'Crow steps' on the gable ends

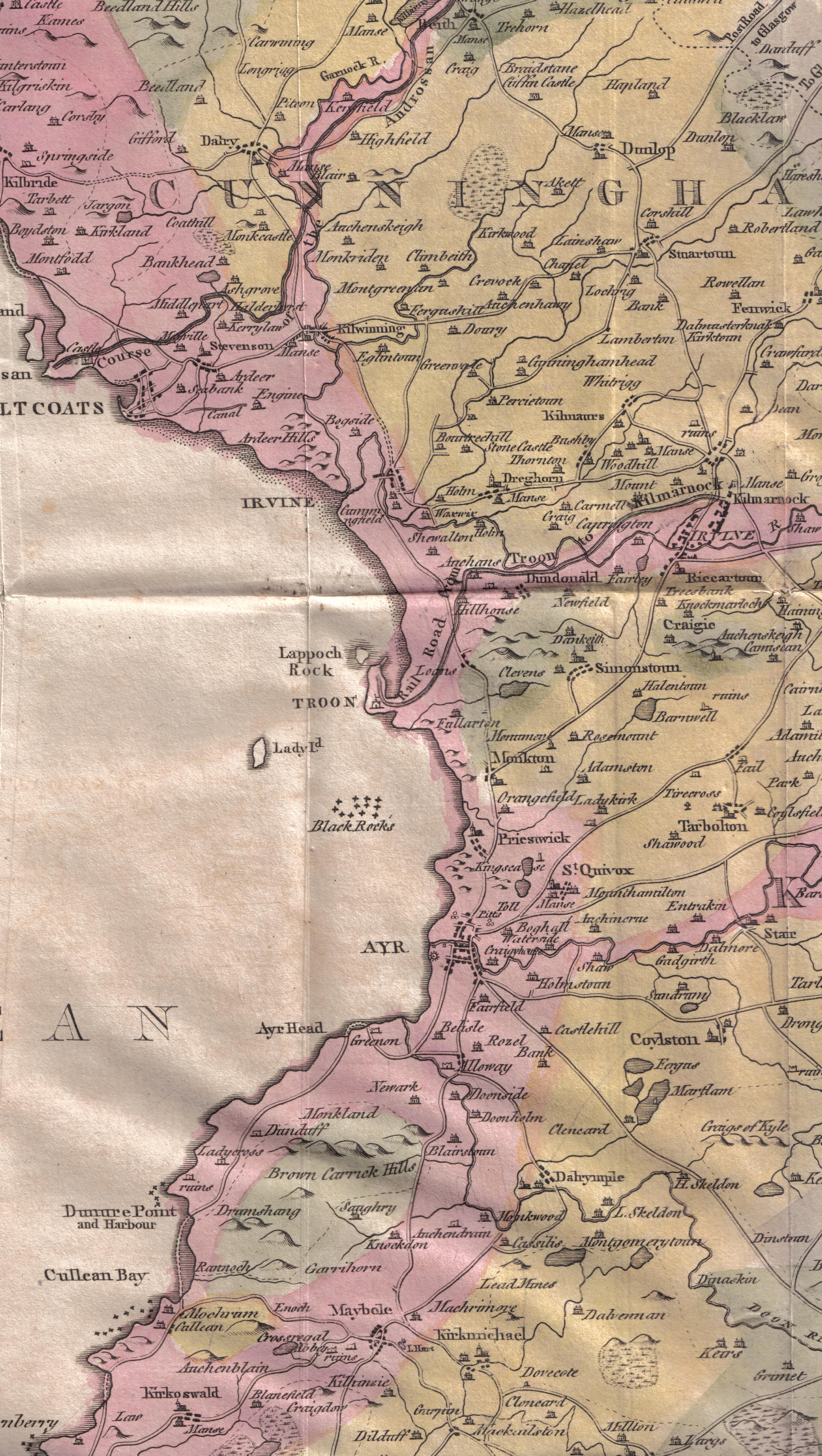
- William Aiton's map of Ayrshire showing 'Gifford'
- Country: United Kingdom
- County: North Ayrshire
- Region: Strathclyde
- Parish: Dalry

Giffordland is in North Ayrshire, Parish of Dalry (Cunninghame) in the former Region of Strathclyde, Scotland.

== Background ==
Giffordland was a small barony, but the families associated with it played an active part in the history of feudal Scotland.

The name is given as just 'Gifford' on Armstrong's 1775 map and Ainslie's 1821 map and as 'Giffertland Mains' on the first 6 inch OS maps of 1840 - 1880. A Giffordland Mill, originally with stepping stones and now a bridge, lie at the Caaf Water (Keaff in 1747 ); a smithy lay close to the Caaf Water near the Dalry to West Kilbride Road. A limekiln were located near to the 'Mains' farm buildings. A ford existed over the Auldmuir Burn until the late 19th century.

The Auldmuir Burn runs through a deeply cut glen which has been planted up with beech trees in the vicinity of Giffordland Farm. A small building sat close to the junction of the road to Auldmuir, and a building known as 'Green House' is marked as a ruin in the 1840–1880 Ordnance Survey map and an active settlement on Roy's map of 1747.

== History ==
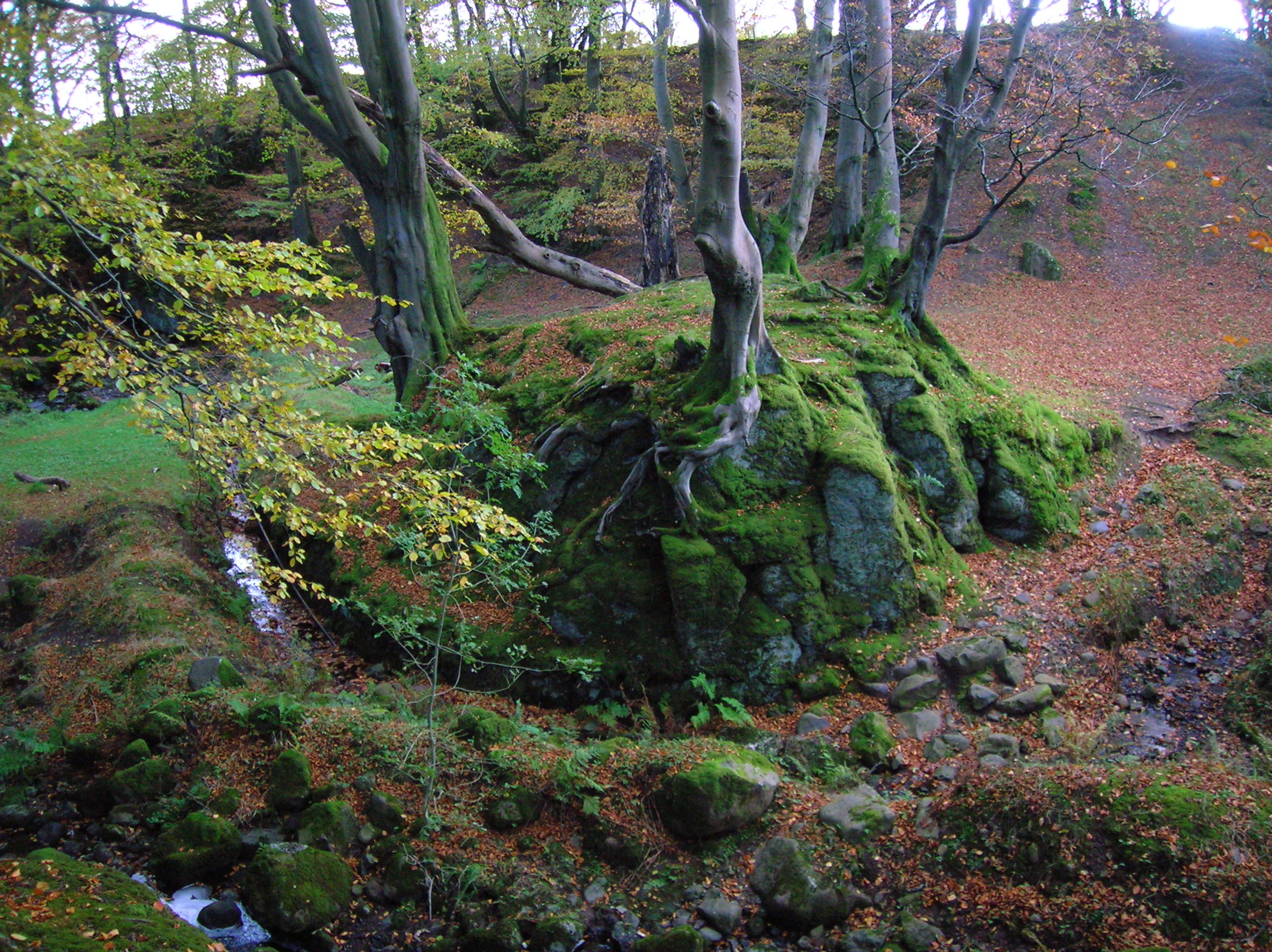
A semi-natural 'Moot Hill' in the glen with old beech trees and the Auldmuir Burn

The Barony of Giffordland included the estate of Auldmuir, including the one merk land of Wardlaw and Bradshaw. Paterson describes Gifford as being a mansion house set on the banks of a rivulet (the Auldmuir Burn) about two miles West of Dalry, small in dimensions, but surrounded by old woods. George Robertson gives the same account, but states in the 1820s that it was not in the best of order.. Its rental value at the time was £123 6s 8d. The Barony would have had a Moot hill and the small mound in the Giffordland Glen shows signs of having been artificially altered (see illustration). Giffordland had also been known as Netherton.

=== The Giffords ===
Gifford or Giffordland takes its name from the Giffords or Giffards, a Norman family who under King William the Lion (1165–1214) obtained lands in Scotland, such as the Parish of Yester in the Lothians near Haddington. The male line failed with Sir Hugh Gifford who had four daughters and died in 1409. Robertson relates that Sir Thomas Boyd of Kilmarnock married Alice, one of these four daughter co-heiresses, but he does not actually record any relationship with the Craufurds of Kilmarnock, progenitors of the Gifford cadet branch at just this time. A village named Gifford is located near the old Yester Castle of the Gifford's in East Lothian.

=== The Craufurds ===
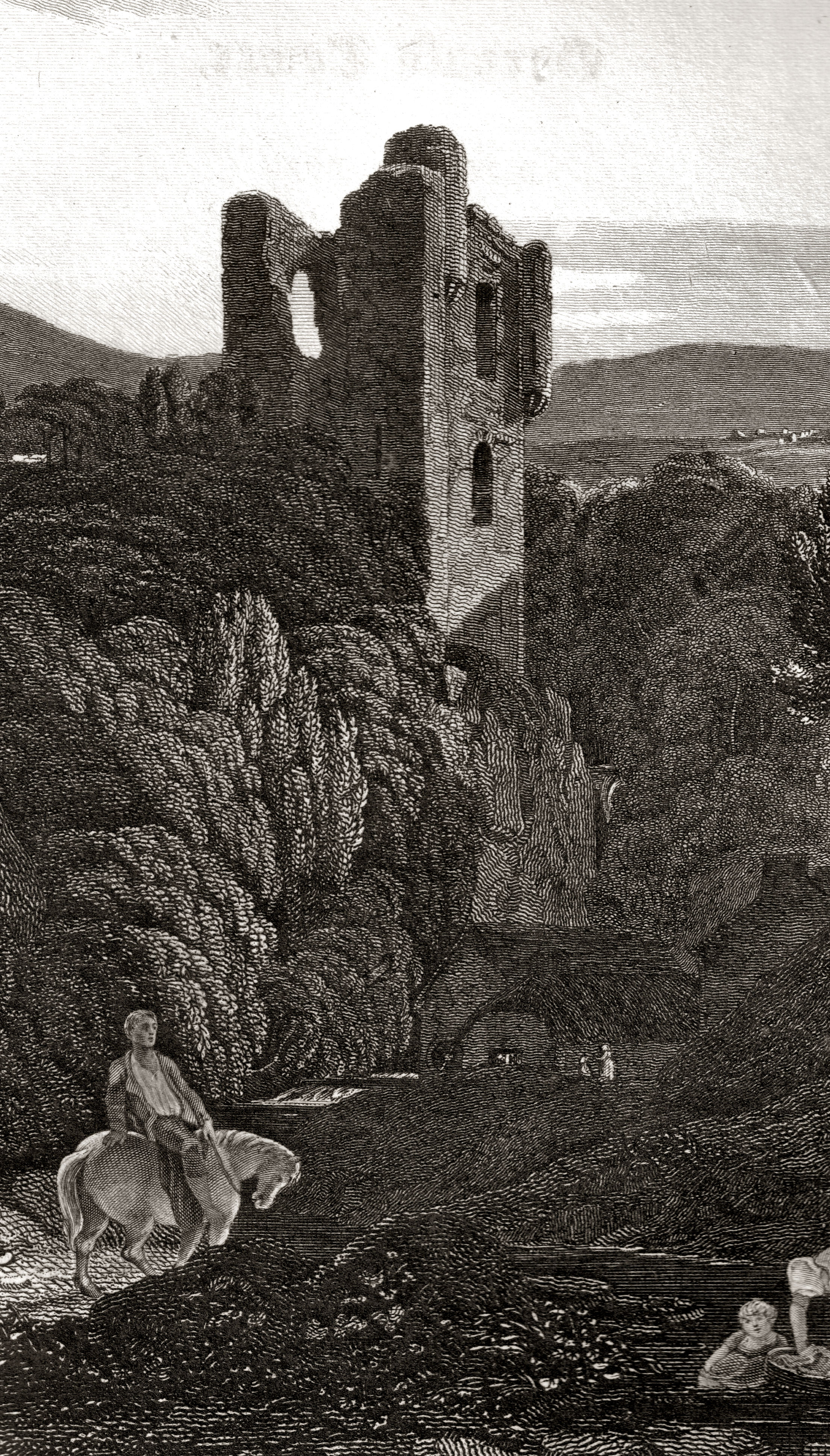
Yester or Garvald Castle in East Lothian; once held by the Gifford family

The Craufurds of Giffordland were cadets of the house of Craufurdland. John was the first of the line, son of John Craufurd of Craufurdland and living in 1440 was succeeded by his son John in 1480. Andrew Craufurd of Giffordland was killed at Flodden in 1513 and in 1547 John Craufurd was killed at the battle of Pinkie, having married twice, once to the daughter of the Laird of Kelburne; and secondly to the daughter of the Laird of Hunterston. The Craufurds of Birkheid were cadets of Giffordland. In 1543 John Craufurd of Giffordland and John Craufurd of Birkheid were found to have failed to support Mary Queen of Scots at the Siege of Coldingham during the troubles linked to King Henry VIII of England's attempts to persuade the Scottish Queen to marry his son, Prince Edward. John Craufurd obtained a grant of the lands of Giffordland from James VI under the Great Seal on 27 March 1576. His wife was Margaret Blair daughter of John Blair of that Ilk. He died in 1583.

At the Castle of Blair on May 3, 1595, Margaret Craufurd and her husband Thomas Craufurd of Giffordland granted their eldest daughter, Grizel and her husband, John Blair of Windyedge, a third part of the Three pound land of Giffordland. At a later stage they also gave the lands of Bradshaw (Broadshaw) and Knockendon. It is recorded that Margaret Craufurd could not write and it is clear from the original parchment that the notary had to guide her hand. From this marriage the Blairs of Giffordland were descended.

Isabel Craufurd, Grizel's sister, married John Craufurd of Walston and had been retoured a portion of the Giffordland lands in 1548; their son John died in France. Thomas Craufurd of Walston, their direct descendant, is recorded as a portioner of Giffordland after 1600 and he married a daughter of the Laird of Craufurdland. Alexander Blair of Giffordland married Jeane Broun of Burrowland in the early 17th century and had two sons, Alexander and John; Alexander inherited Giffordland.

The Craufurds, as lairds of Giffordland, maintained a town house in Irvine. A 1499 inventory records that the house contained two dinner tables, five benches, kitchen equipment, three storage chests, five beds with bedding, and pillows, an iron chimney and tongs.

=== The Boyds and Blairs ===
In 1577 Isabella and Margaret Craufurd, daughters of the deceased John Craufurd of Giffertland, with the agreement of their husbands (John Craufurd and Thomas Craufurd), agreed to the resignation of the three pound lands of Mains of Giffertland or Nethertoun, with the manor-place, etc to Robert, Lord Boyd. The two and a half merk lands of Birkatt; six merk lands of Braidschaw; and two merk lands of Knockindone, also in the Lordship of Giffertland were in addition resigned. John Blair obtained the Superiority of Birkatt.

In 1614 Robert Lord Boyd inherited 'Giffertland' from his father, Robert, Master of Boyd. Alexander Blair inherited the lands from his father in 1634, confirmed by the Superior, Lord Boyd, in 1641. He married a Jean Brown of Burrowland and his second son, John, became Laird of Burrowland. The line continued and William Blair married an English Lady, having two sons, the eldest of whom, Edward, was a ward of Chancery due to a commission of lunacy and the youngest therefore became proprietor. William Dobie states that the younger brother died in London and Edward was therefore the end of the direct male line. Alexander Blaire of Giffartland (sic) paid £18 4s 02d feu deuty in 1666 for his lands of Barow Landis (sic) and others pertaining to him.

=== The Morrises ===
The estate of Auldmuir, including the one merk land of Wardlaw is recorded as having been owned in 1807 by Robert Morris of Craig in Kilmaurs parish, whose son, Hugh Baxter Morris also inherited Auldmuir and the Wardlaws.

=== Thirdpart farm ===
The farm of this name appears to have its origin in the marriage settlement or dowry of Grizel Craufurd in 1595.

== Giffordland Glen ==
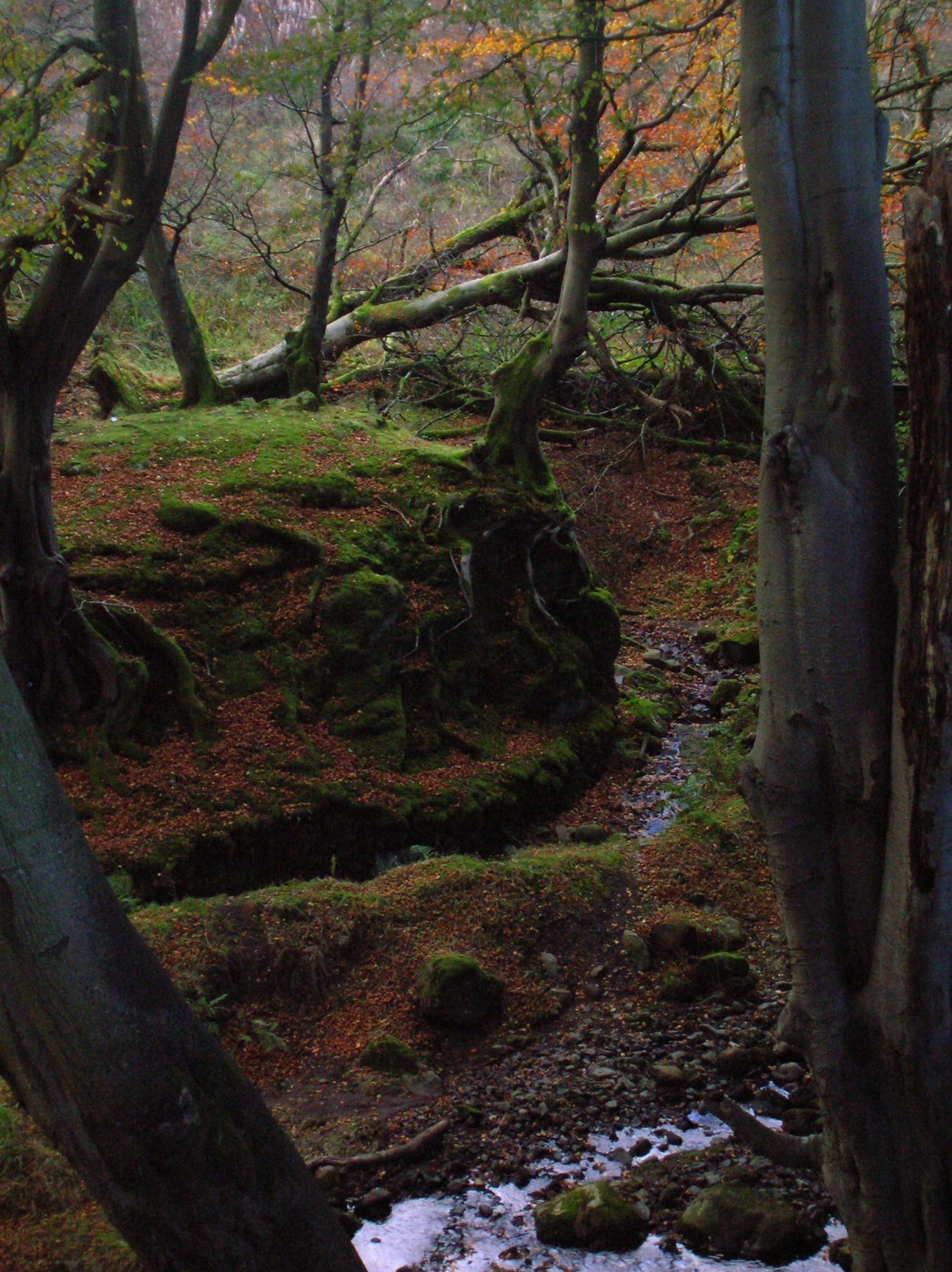
A view across the glen with the Auldmuir Burn

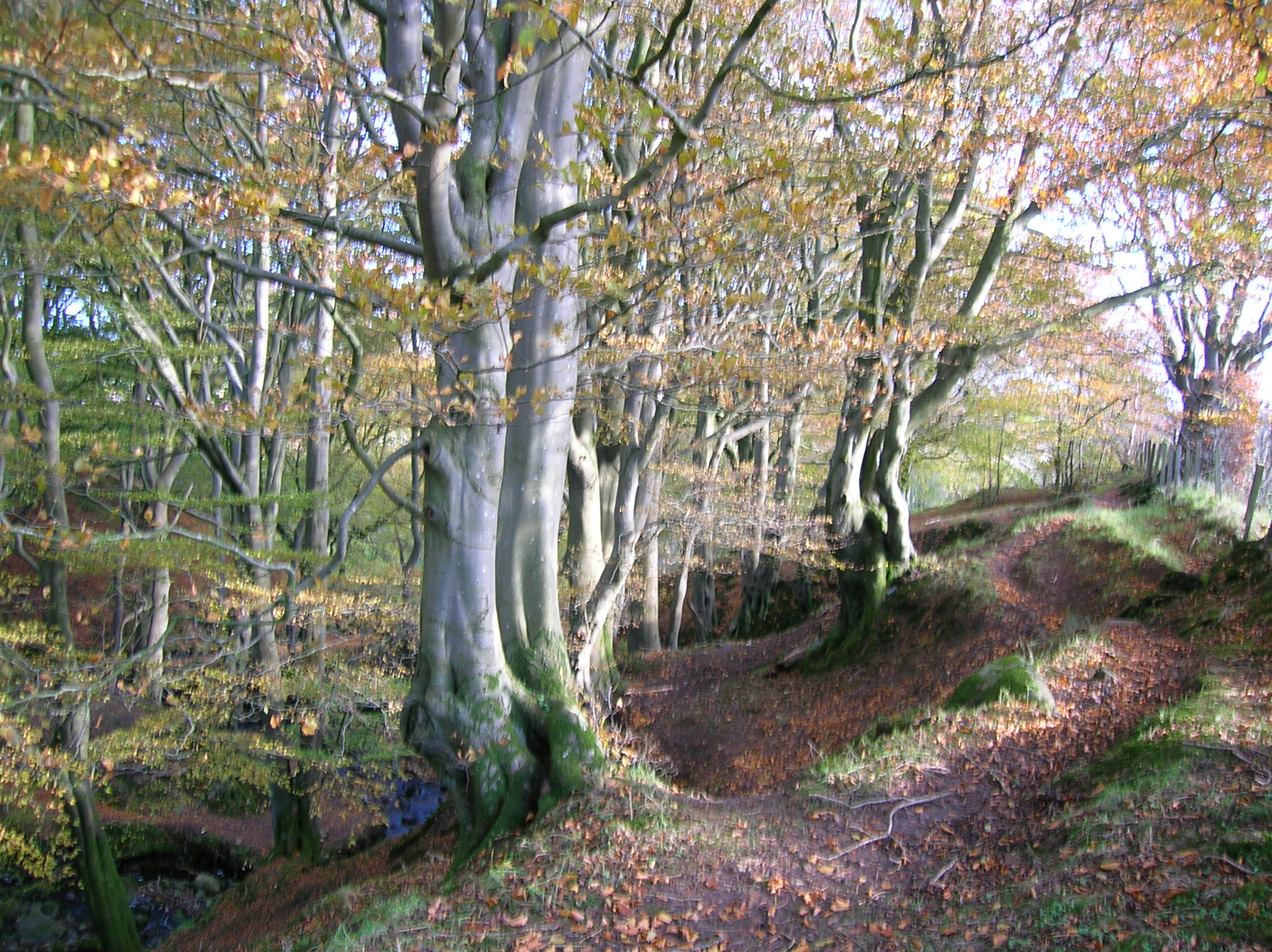
The upper part of the wood near the road

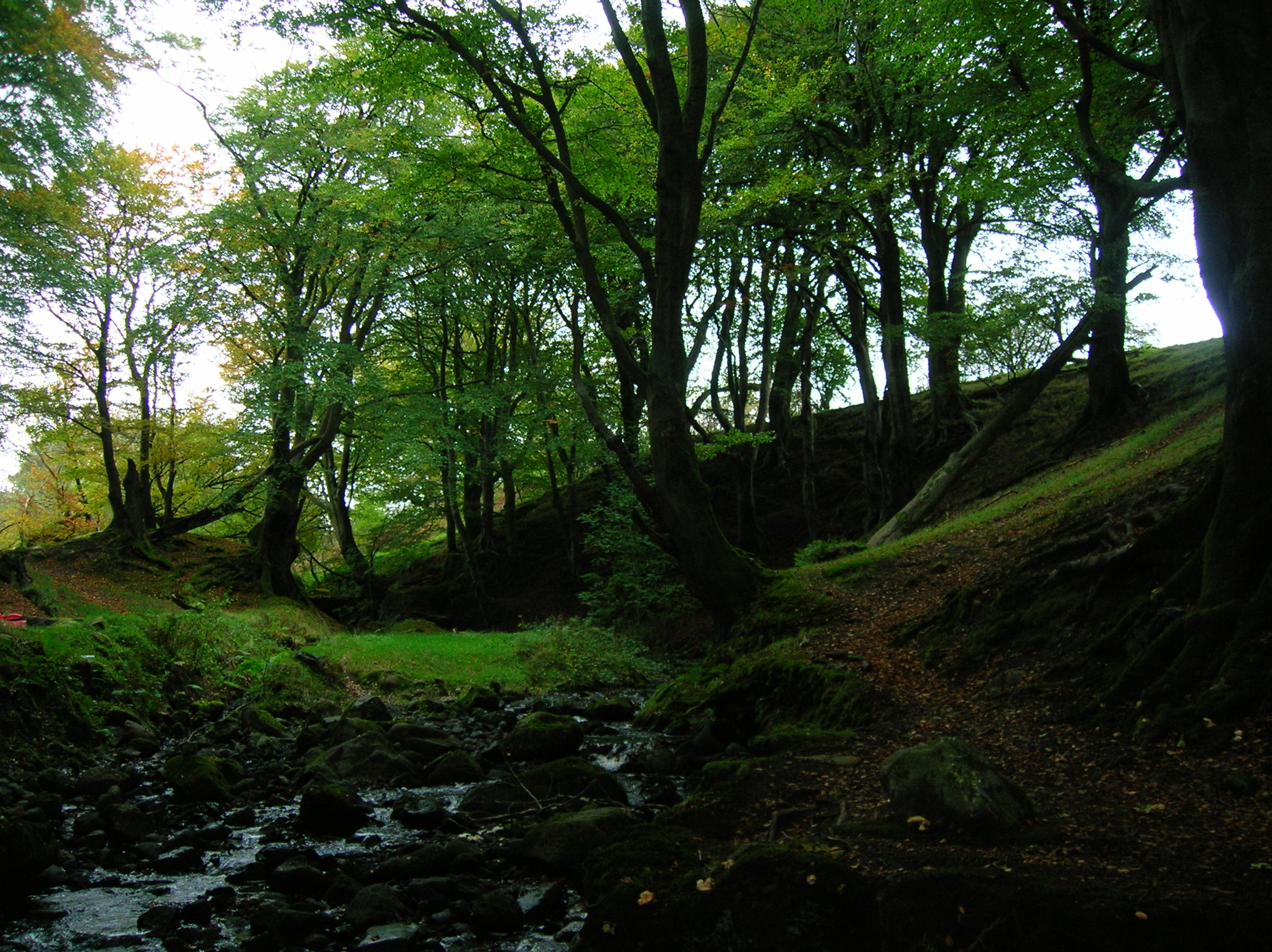
Looking up the glen towards the 'Moot Hill'

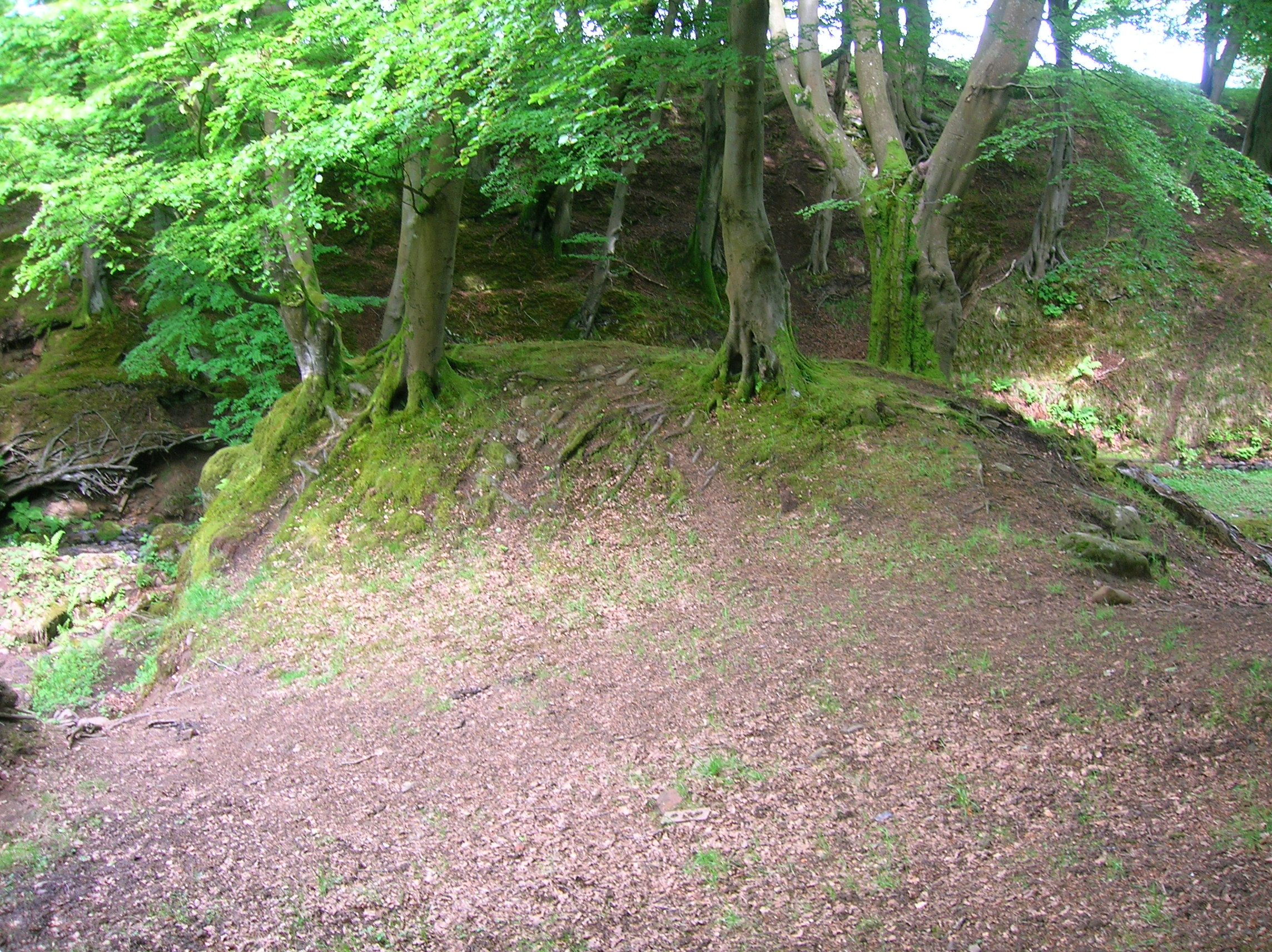
The approach to the 'Moot Hill'

== Natural history ==
Giffordland Glen is a provisional Wildlife Site, listed as such by the Scottish Wildlife Trust due to its old woodlands and biodiversity.

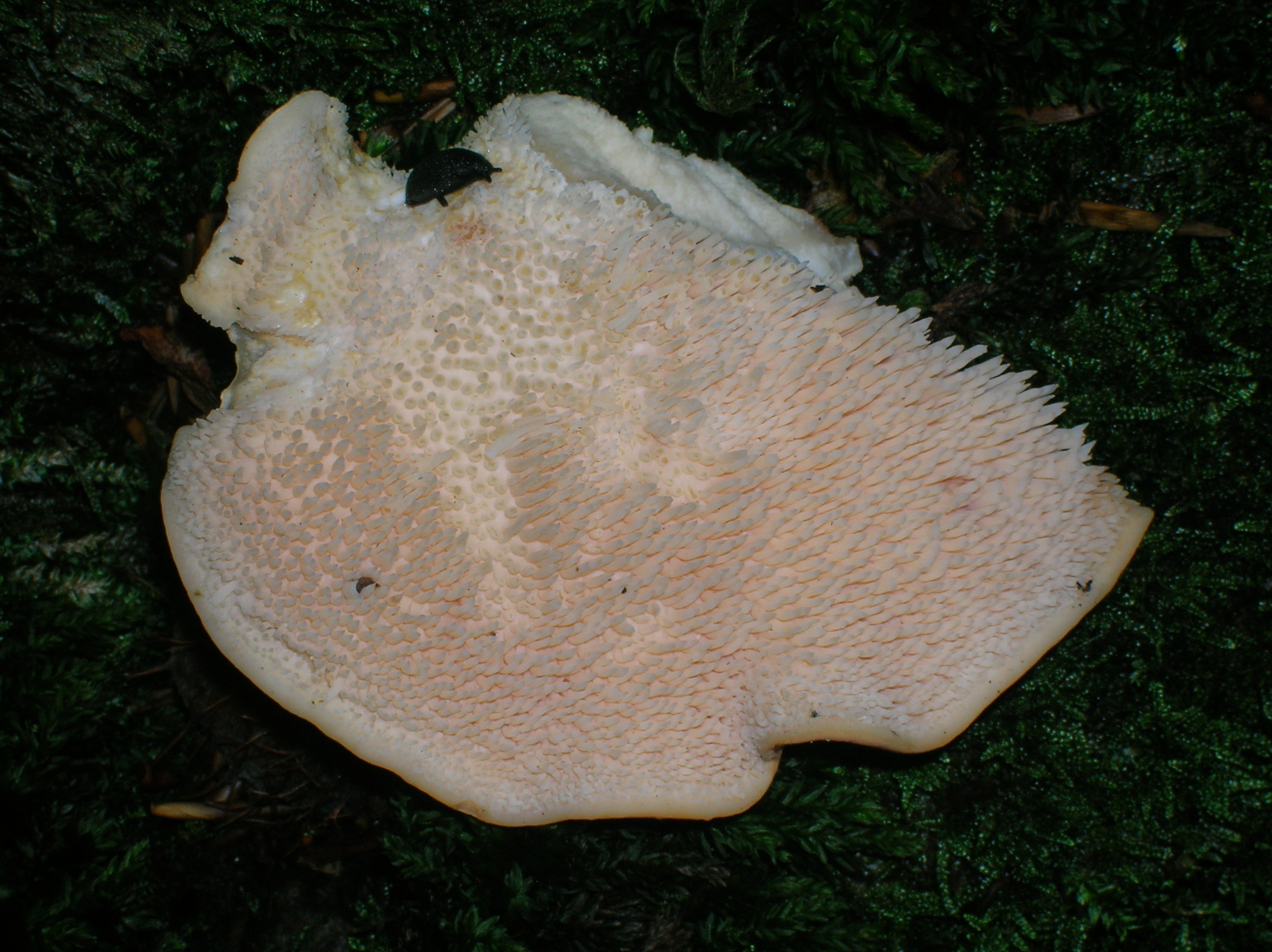
The Hedgehog fungus (Hydnum repandum) at Giffordland

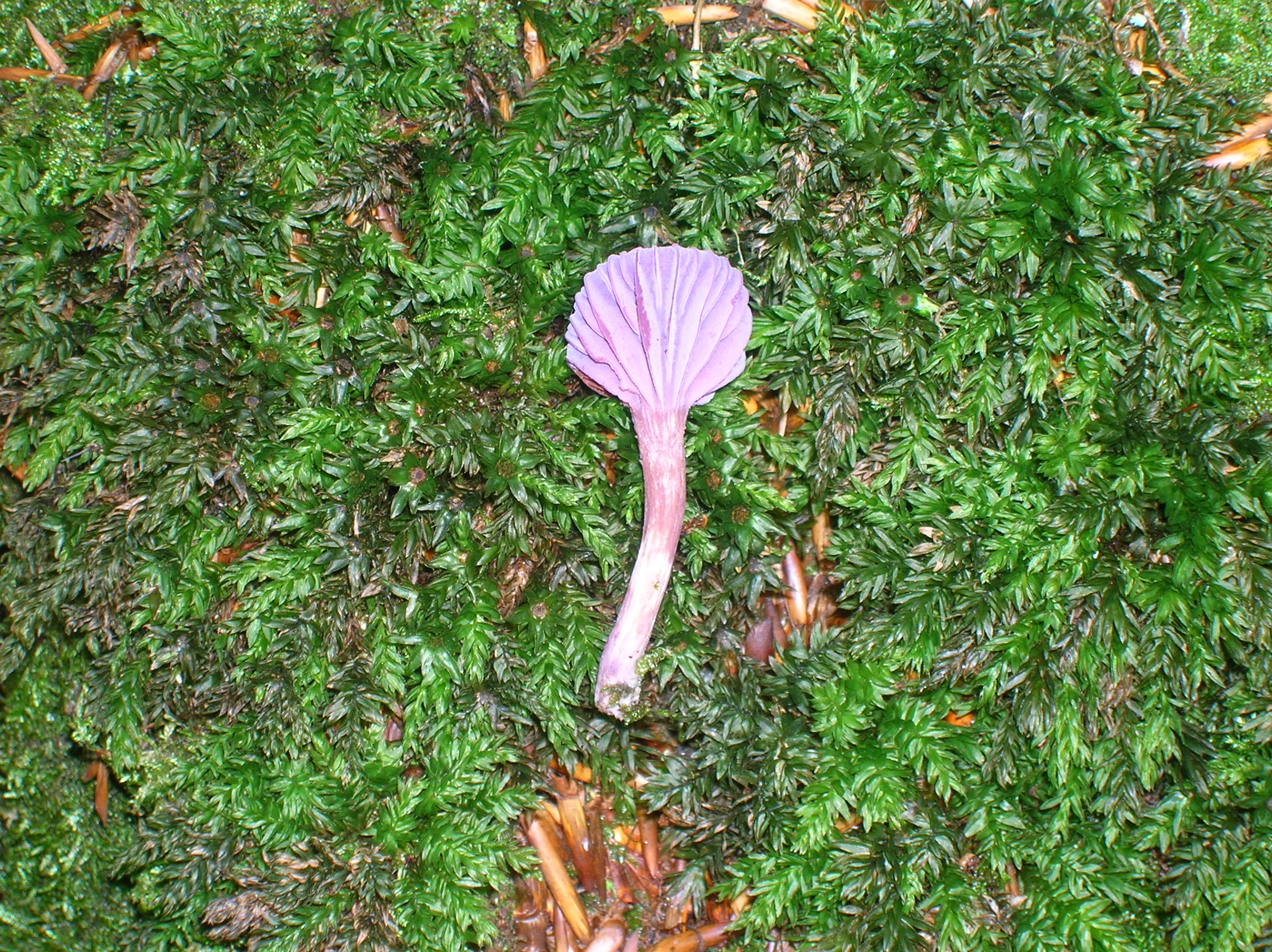
The Amethyst Deceiver (Laccaria) at Giffordland

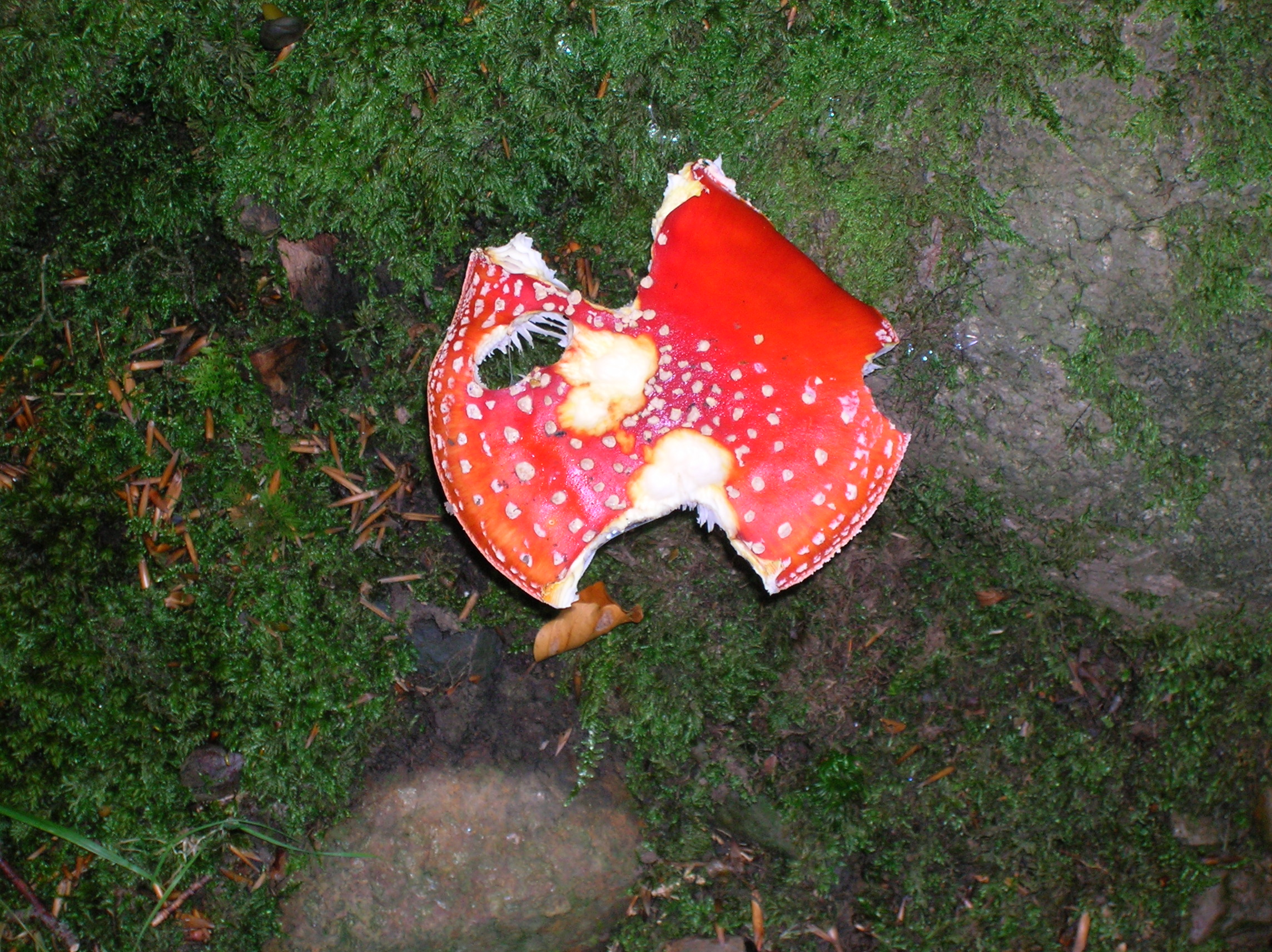
The Fly Agaric (Amanita muscaria) at Giffordland, damaged by slugs

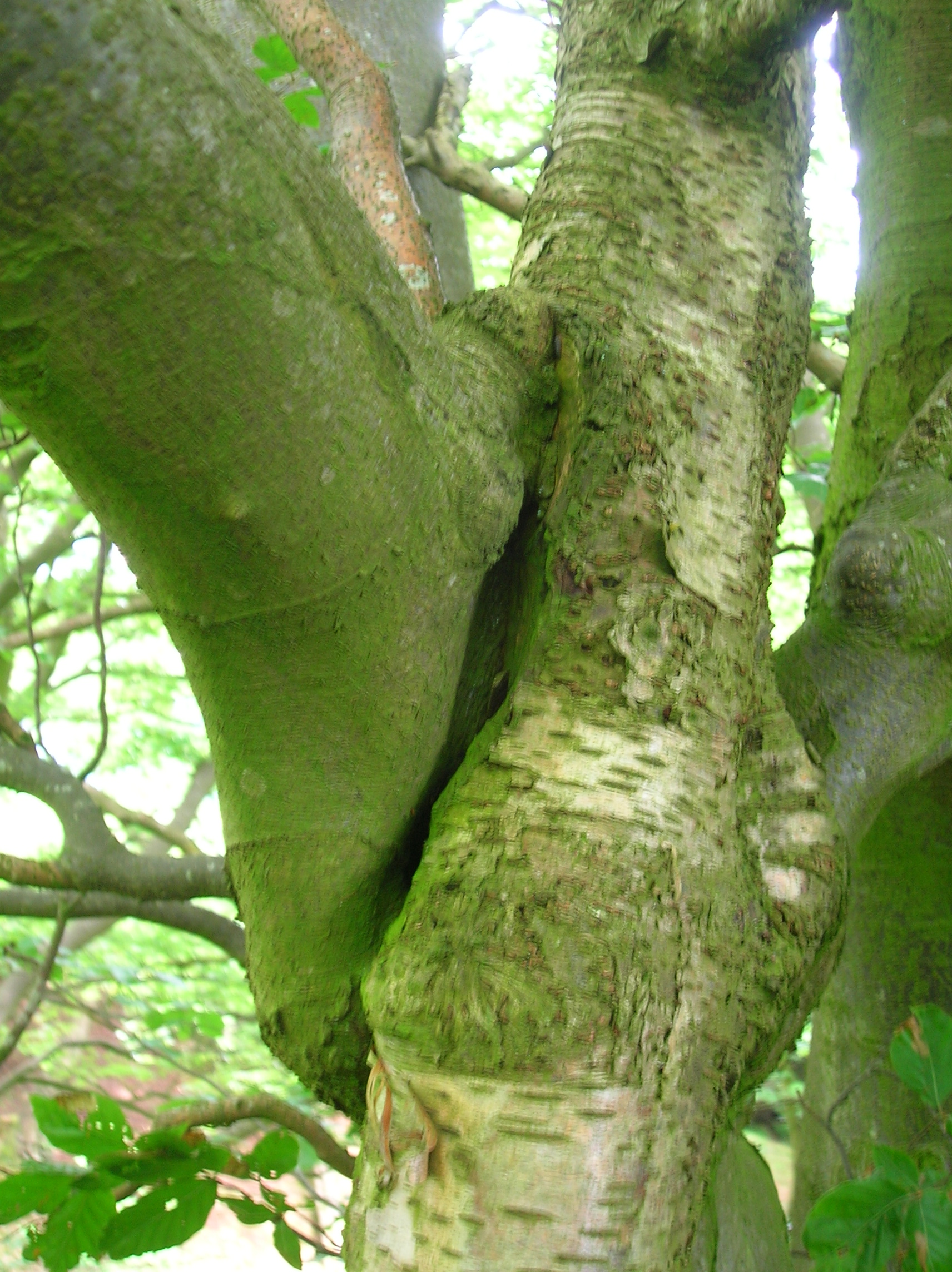
Very rare inosculated Beech and Birch in the Giffordland Glen

== See also ==
- Cat Stones of Scotland
