= Silverwood (disambiguation) =

Silverwood may refer to:

== Places ==
=== Australia ===
- Silverwood, Queensland, a locality in the Southern Downs Region

=== Canada ===
- Silverwood Heights, Saskatoon, Saskatchewan, a neighborhood
- Rural Municipality of Silverwood No. 123, Saskatchewan
- Fredericton-Silverwood, a provincial electoral district in New Brunswick

=== United Kingdom ===
- Silverwood, Ayrshire, a farm, previously a small country estate.
- Silverwood, County Armagh, a townland in County Armagh, Northern Ireland

=== United States ===
- Silverwood, Indiana, an unincorporated community
- Silverwood, Michigan
- Silverwood Lake, a reservoir in San Bernardino County, California
- Silverwood Theme Park, an amusement park in northern Idaho

== People with the surname ==
- Chris Silverwood, English cricketer
- Richard Silverwood (born 1976), English rugby league referee

== Other uses ==
- Silverwood Colliery, Yorkshire, England
- Silverwood Dairy, an Ontario dairy company
- Silverwood School, a special school in Wiltshire, England
