= Aiton (surname) =

Aiton is a surname of Scottish origin. Notable people with the surname include:

- George Aiton, Major League Baseball player
- John Aiton, Scottish religious writer
- Paul Aiton, Papua New Guinean rugby league player
- William Aiton (1731–1793), Scottish botanist for whom the standard author abbreviation "Aiton" is used when citing a botanical name
- William Townsend Aiton (1766–1849), Scottish botanist; William Aiton's son
- William Aiton (sheriff), Scottish law agent

== See also ==
- Ayton (surname)
- Aytoun, several biographies
