= John Aiton =

Scottish religious writer (1797–1863)

John Aiton D.D. (June 1797 – 1863) was a Scottish religious writer.

He was the youngest son of William Aiton, a sheriff-substitute of Lanarkshire, and was born at Strathaven, June 1797. He published, in 1824, ‘A Refutation of Mr. Robert Owen's Objections to Christianity.’ For this pamphlet he was presented by the then Lord Douglas to the benefice of Dolphinton, South Lanarkshire. His other works are: 1. ‘The Life and Times of Alexander Henderson,’ Edin. 1836. 2. ‘Clerical Economics,’ Edin. 1842. 3. ‘Eight Weeks in Germany,’ Edin. 1842. 4. ‘The Lands of the Messiah, Mahomet, and the Pope,’ Edin. 1852. 5. ‘The Drying-up of the Euphrates,’ London, 1853. 6. ‘St. Paul and his localities in their past and present condition,’ London, 1856. He held his living till his death in 1863.
