= Ayton (surname) =

Ayton is an English surname. Notable people with the surname include:

- Charles John Ayton (1846–1922), New Zealand miner and diarist
- David Ayton Sr. (1857–1931), Scottish golfer
- Deandre Ayton (born 1998), Bahamian basketball player
- Fanny Ayton (1806–1899), English opera singer
- Frank Ayton (1873–1936), English electrical engineer
- John Ayton (born c. 1963), British businessman
- Laurie Ayton Sr. (1884–1962), Scottish golfer
- Laurie Ayton Jr. (1914–1989), Scottish golfer
- Philip Ayton (born 1947), English squash player
- Richard Ayton (1786–1823), English dramatist and writer
- Robert Ayton (1915–1985), British artist and illustrator
- Sarah Ayton (born 1980), English sailor
- Tiah-Mai Ayton (born 2006), English professional boxer
- William Alexander Ayton (1816–1909), British Anglican clergyman

== See also ==
- Aiton (surname)
- Aytoun, includes a list of people with the surname
