= Ayten =

Ayten is a Turkish and Azerbaijani feminine given name. The Azerbaijani form is Aytən. Notable people with these names include:

== Given name ==
- Ayten Akyol, Turkish beauty queen
- Ayten Alpman (1929–2012), Turkish singer
- Ayten Amer (born 1981), Egyptian actress
- Ayten Amin (born 1978), Egyptian film director
- Ayten Gökçer (1940–2024), Turkish actress
- Ayten Kuyululu (1930–2019), Turkish-Australian film director
- Aytən Mustafayeva (born 1968), Azerbaijani politician
- Ayten Mutlu (born 1952), Turkish poet and writer
- Ayten Yeksan (born 2002), Turkish judoka

== Fictional characters ==
- Ayten, one of the major characters in the movie The Edge of Heaven (film) by Fatih Akin

== See also ==
- Aydın
- Ayton (disambiguation)
