= Cat Stones of Scotland =

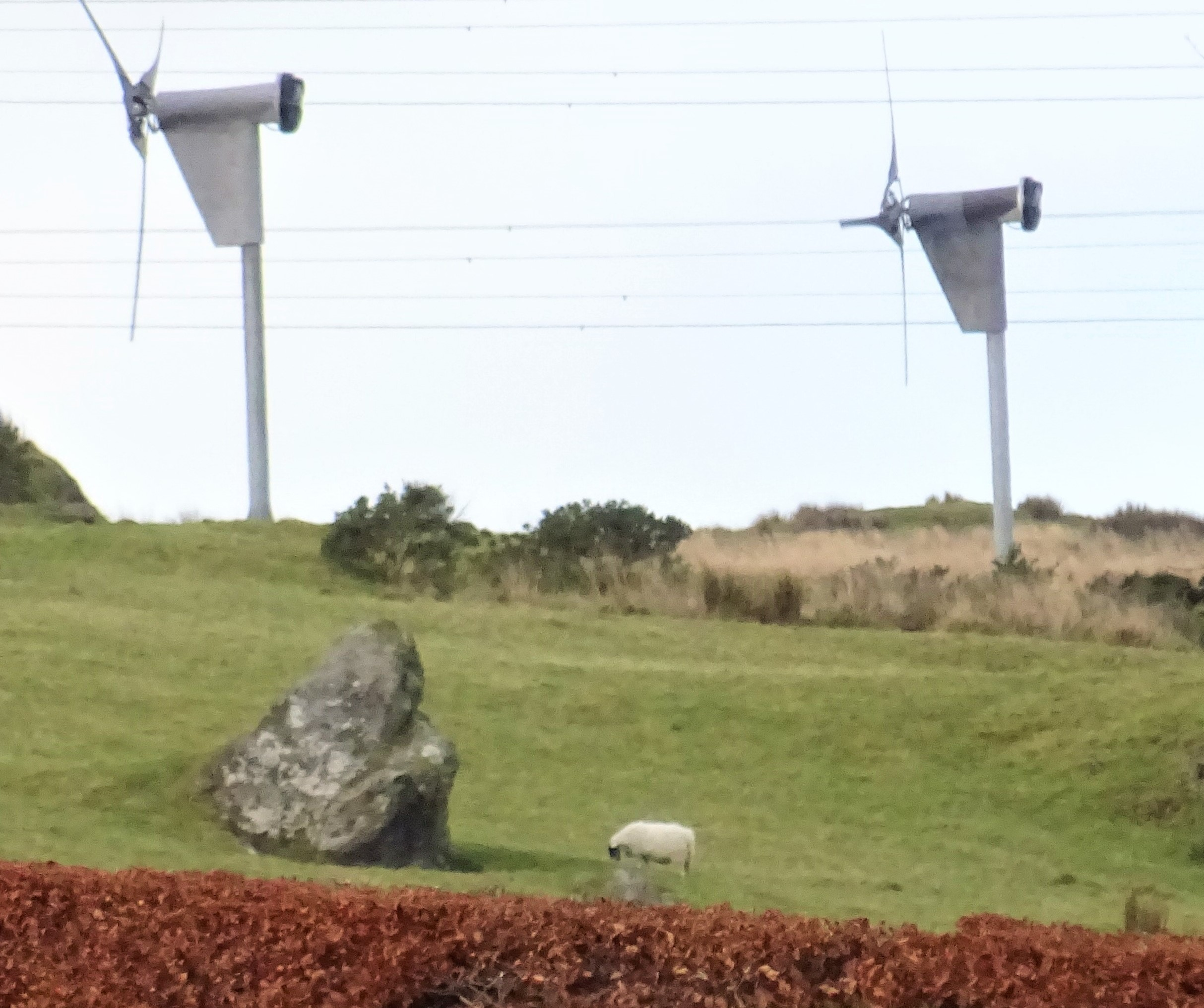
The Catstone at Blackstone as seen from the Giffordland Mill site.

The Cat Stones of Scotland (or, in Scots Gaelic, the Clach a'Chath) are natural prominent rock features or standing stones around Scotland that are often linked to battles or burials. The English term cat applied to such stones derives from the Gaelic cath (lit. 'battle'). Clach a'Chait would be the Gaelic for "Stone of the Cat".

The name has a variety of spellings in English, including Catstone, Cat Stone, Catstane, Cat's Stone and Cat Stane.

== Associations ==
The Cat Stones are mainly linked with battles or burials whilst a few may have primary or secondary connections with Scottish Wildcats (Felis silvestris). Many hills also have 'Cat' as a part of their name such as Cat Castle, Cat Law, Cath Law, Cat Hill, Cade Hill, Cat Cairn, Hill of Cat, etc. The 'Cat' element origin is one of the more disputed of the place-names. The Scots Gaelic 'caid' means summit and 'cath' means battle. Cairns were once referred to as 'cat-heaps'.

Cairns or tumuli are often associated with battles or burial sites, such as the supposed burial place of Somerled at Knock in Renfrewshire where Thomas Pennant in 1772 was shown "a mount or tumulus, with a foss round the base, and a single stone on the top, which he was told indicated the spot where Somerled was slain."

== Cat Stone sites ==
=== The Catstane, City of Edinburgh ===
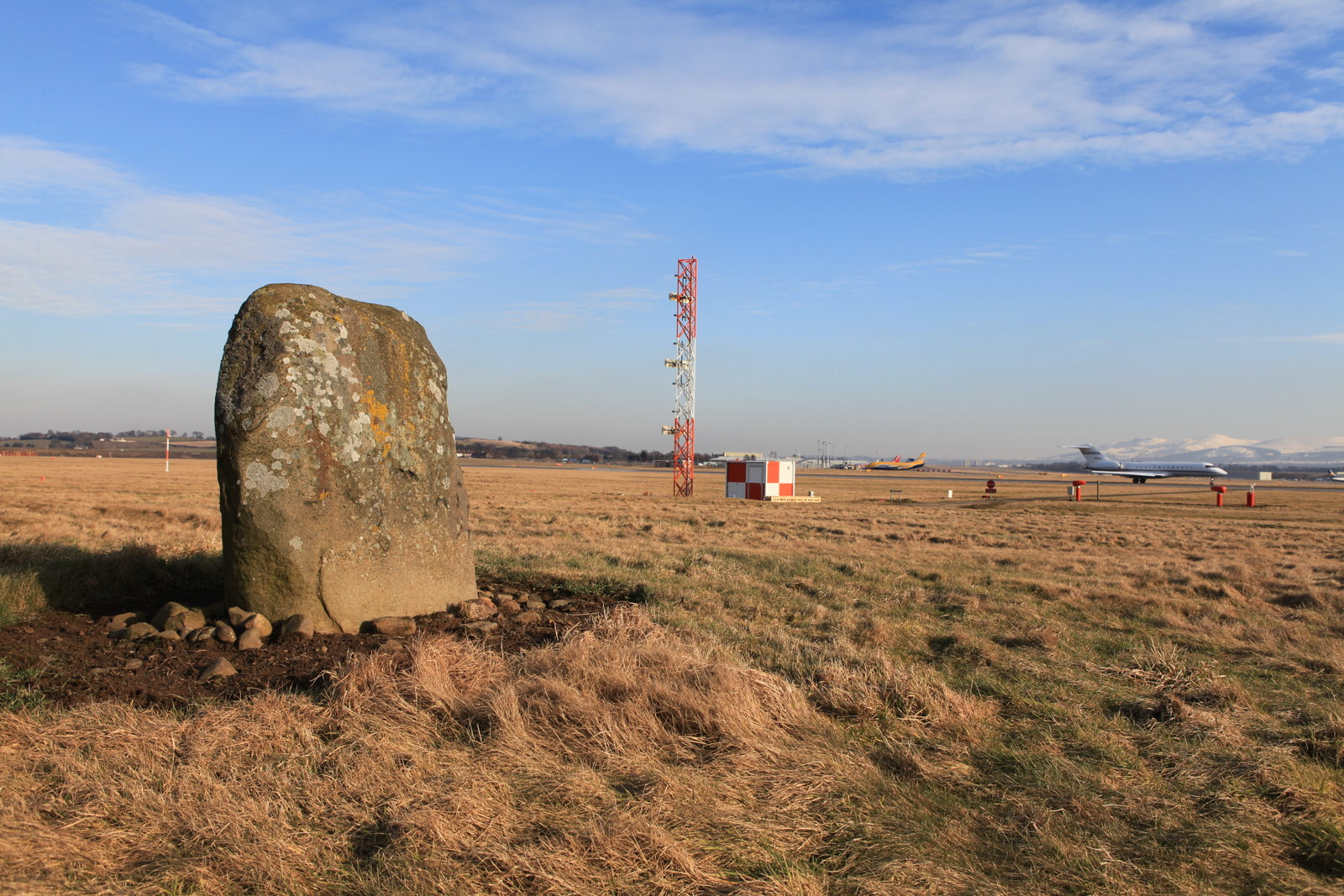
The Catstane at Edinburgh Airport in its original location.

The Catstane (NT 14899 74378), a monolith, formed the focus for a cemetery of long-cist burials and once bore an inscription, translated as "In this tomb lies Vetta, daughter of Victricus"' written in a 5th or 6th century AD script. The stone is a rounded boulder with a circumference at the base of 3.65m and a height of 1.3m. It is not known whether it was artificially shaped or selected because of its shape. In 1699 it stood on the perimeter of a low cairn with a border of large horizontal kerbstones.

The long cists of an Early Christian cemetery were established in a Bronze Age site consisting of a standing stone and kerb-cairn dating from the second millennium BC, the standing stone then being re-used for an Early Christian inscription. The Catstane has been excavated and removed from its location at Edinburgh Airport due to development works.

The Catstane stood in what had been an arable field on the farm of Brigs and tradition has it that it commemorates either a battle fought between the forces of Malcolm II and those of the usurper Constantine, or the spot where the latter was killed. The name is supposed to be a corruption of Constantine. The battle itself is traditionally said to have been fought about 2 miles west of the Catstane at the Hamlet of Newbridge.

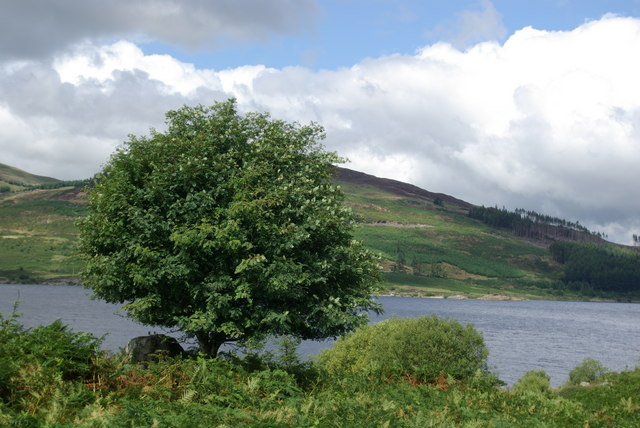
The Cat's Stone beneath a rowan tree on the south bank of Loch Doon.

=== The Cat Stone, Perth and Kinross ===
This standing stone, one of a pair, stands at NGR NN711478 and is also known as Coille Dhubh or Clach Taghairm nan Cat. The nearest village is Fortingall. The associated legend is that at Halloween Scottish wildcats formed a circle around it to dignify a huge black cat that sat atop the stone. The Stone of the Demon stands opposite.

=== The Cat Craig, North Ayrshire ===
In the Barony of Ladyland the Cat Craig is located beside the lane running up to Cockston Farm and is one of two drystone wall enclosed crags.

=== The Cat Stane, North Ayrshire ===
On the lands of Blackstone near Giffordland in North Ayrshire stands the prominent rock feature known as the Cat Stane. No local details of its history survive and John Smith the antiquarian associates it with the site of a battle. As an easily identified and prominent landscape feature that would serve as an ideal rallying point for the vassals of the laird prior to battle as was the borestone at Giffen Castle and Greenhills near Beith, also in North Ayrshire. The Battle of Largs was fought in 1263 and nearby Camphill is said to have been a rallying point for the Scottish army.

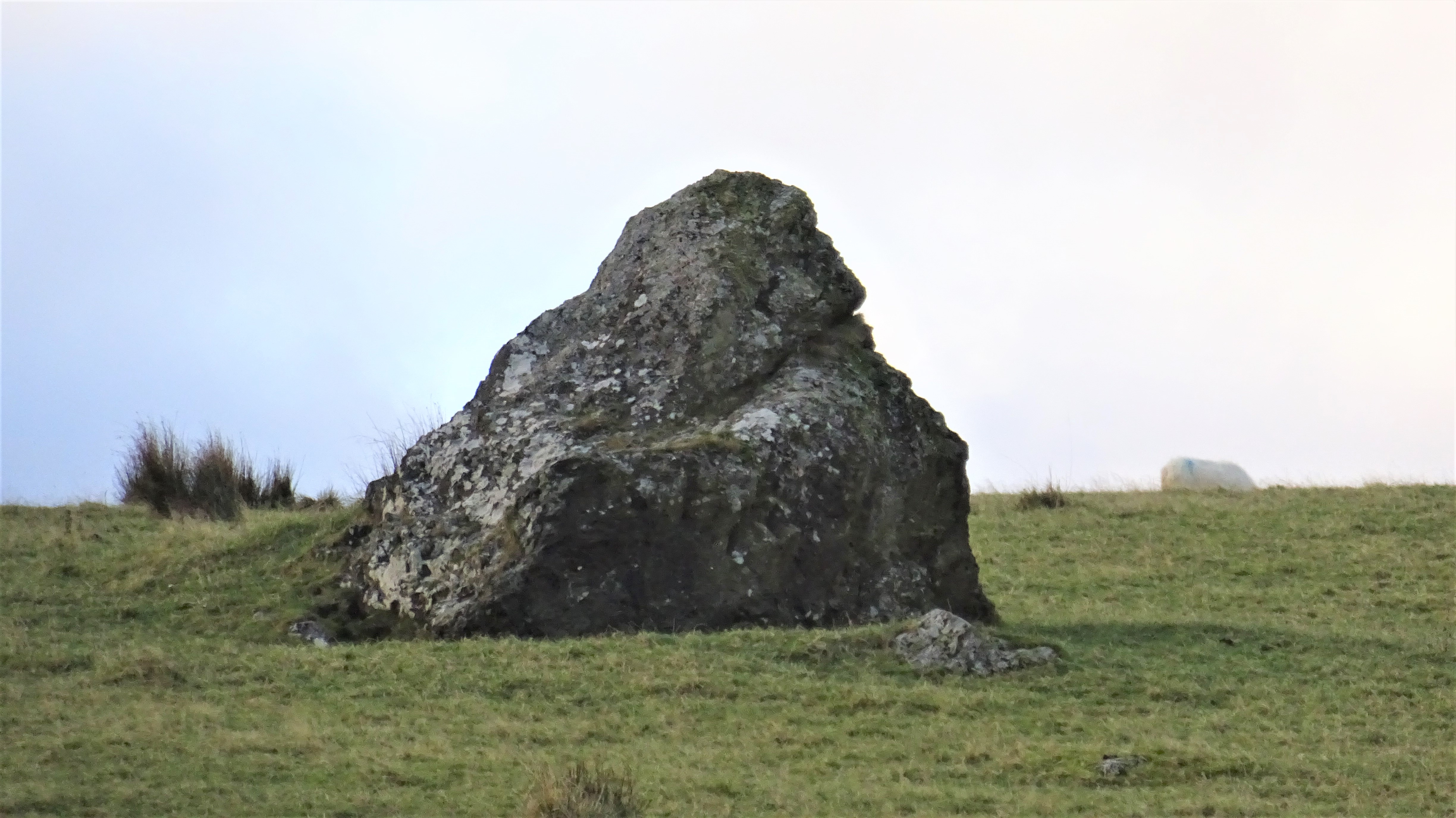
The Catstone on the lands of Blackstone.

=== The Cat Stone or Clach a'Chath, Isle of Arran ===
The story associated with the Cat Stone is that circa 1652 a skirmish took place between garrison troops from Brodick Castle and a group of locals at Allt-a-Chlaideimh (Sword Burn) with the last soldier killed at Clach-a-Chath, the Battle Stone (NR918488).

=== The Cat's Stone, Dumfries and Galloway ===
This stone overlooks the original site of Loch Doon Castle in Dumfries and Galloway.

=== The Cat Stone, Banff ===
At the summit of the Cat Stone Hill stands a "large rock denuded & waterworn", there is nothing historical or traditional connected with it.

== See also ==
- The Holy Cave, Hunterston
