= Cat Stane =

Inscribed standing stone in Scotland

The Cat Stane
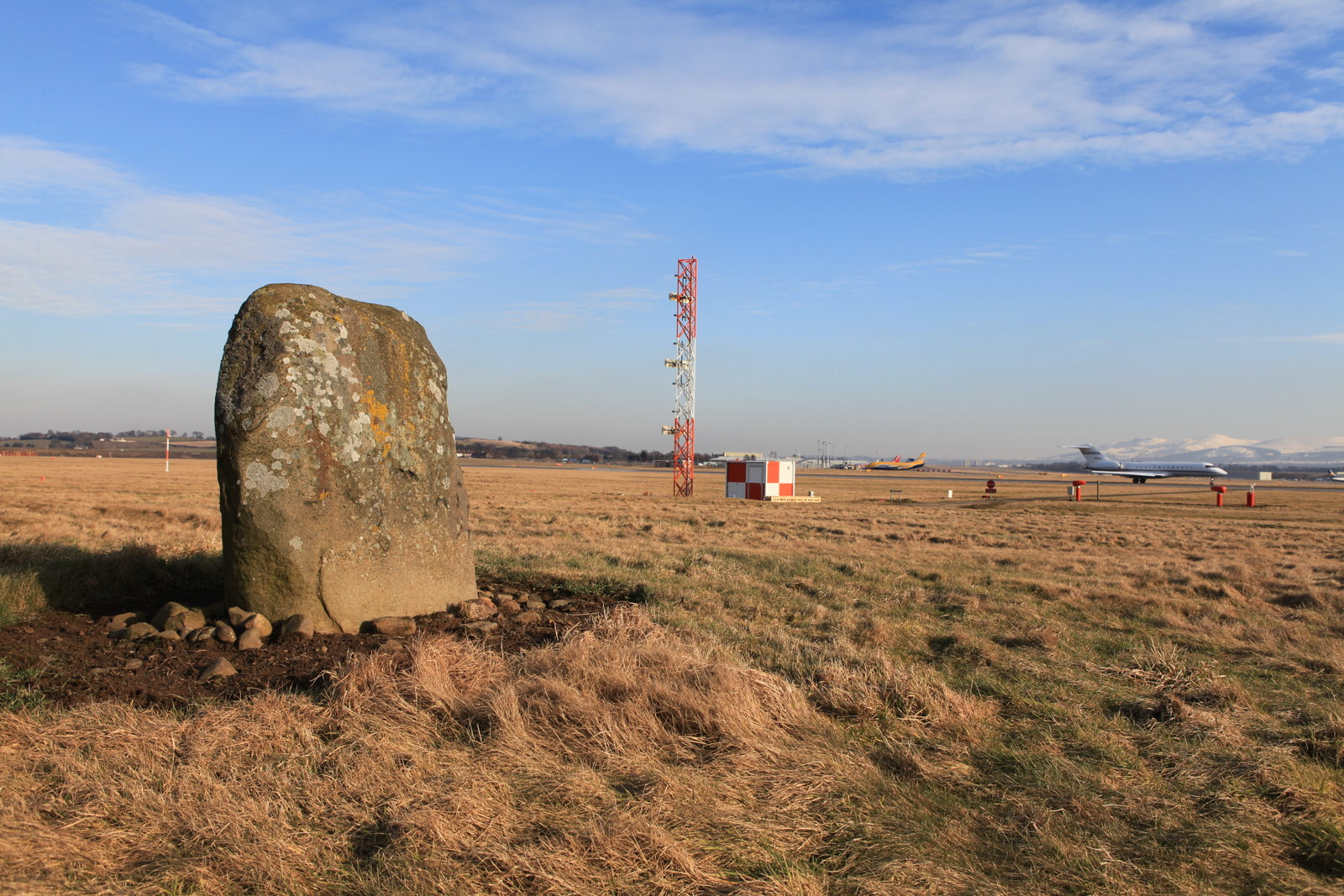

- The Cat Stane in Scotland
- 55°57′17.28″N 3°21′52.2″W
- Type: Megalith
- Periods: Bronze Age, Iron Age
- Cultures: Votadini, Gododdin, Picts
- Location: Edinburgh

Site notes
- Archaeologists: Edward Lhuyd
- Owner: Edinburgh Airport

Scheduled monument
- Official name: Catstane, inscribed stone and long cist cemetery 690m E of Carlowrie
- Designated: 18 August 1882
- Reference no.: SM1183

The Cat Stane, or Catstane, is an inscribed standing stone near Kirkliston, on the outskirts of Edinburgh, in Scotland. It bears a fragmentary inscription dating to the fifth or sixth centuries and was part of a funerary complex consisting of the stone itself, a cairn and a series of cist burials.

The stone's Latin inscription is interpreted as a dedication to a deceased woman whose remains were interred near the stone. Dates have been ascribed to the stone and its inscription by considering the script used and the results of several excavations conducted in modern times.

The stone appears to have been erected in the Bronze Age while the inscription was added in the fifth or sixth centuries AD. During the latter period the area around modern Edinburgh was controlled by the nation known as either the Votadini or the Gododdin.

The Cat Stane now lies within the perimeter of Edinburgh Airport, making it impossible for the general public to access it. Nearby is the confluence of the Gogar Burn and the River Almond. The stone is a scheduled monument.

== Description ==
The Cat Stane is an irregular standing stone of 1.3m height. It is heavily weathered but preserves an inscription in Latin, with several lacunas.

The inscription, carved in a rough Latin script appears to read:

IN OC T
MVLO IAC T
VETTA F
VICTR

This is interpreted by the Royal Commission on the Ancient and Historical Monuments of Scotland (RCAHMS) as representing:

IN THIS
TOMB LIES
VETTA DAUGHTER OF
VICTRICUS

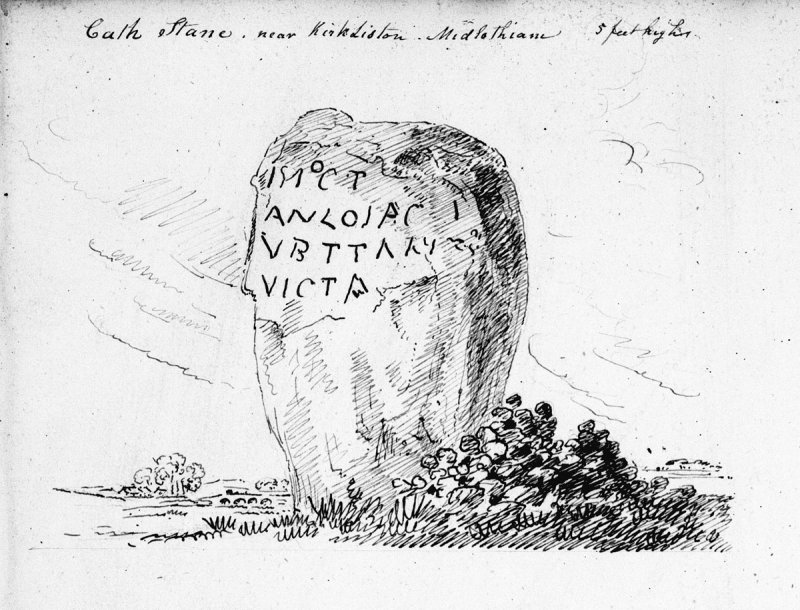
The Cat Stane illustrated in 1860 for the Society of Antiquaries of Scotland.

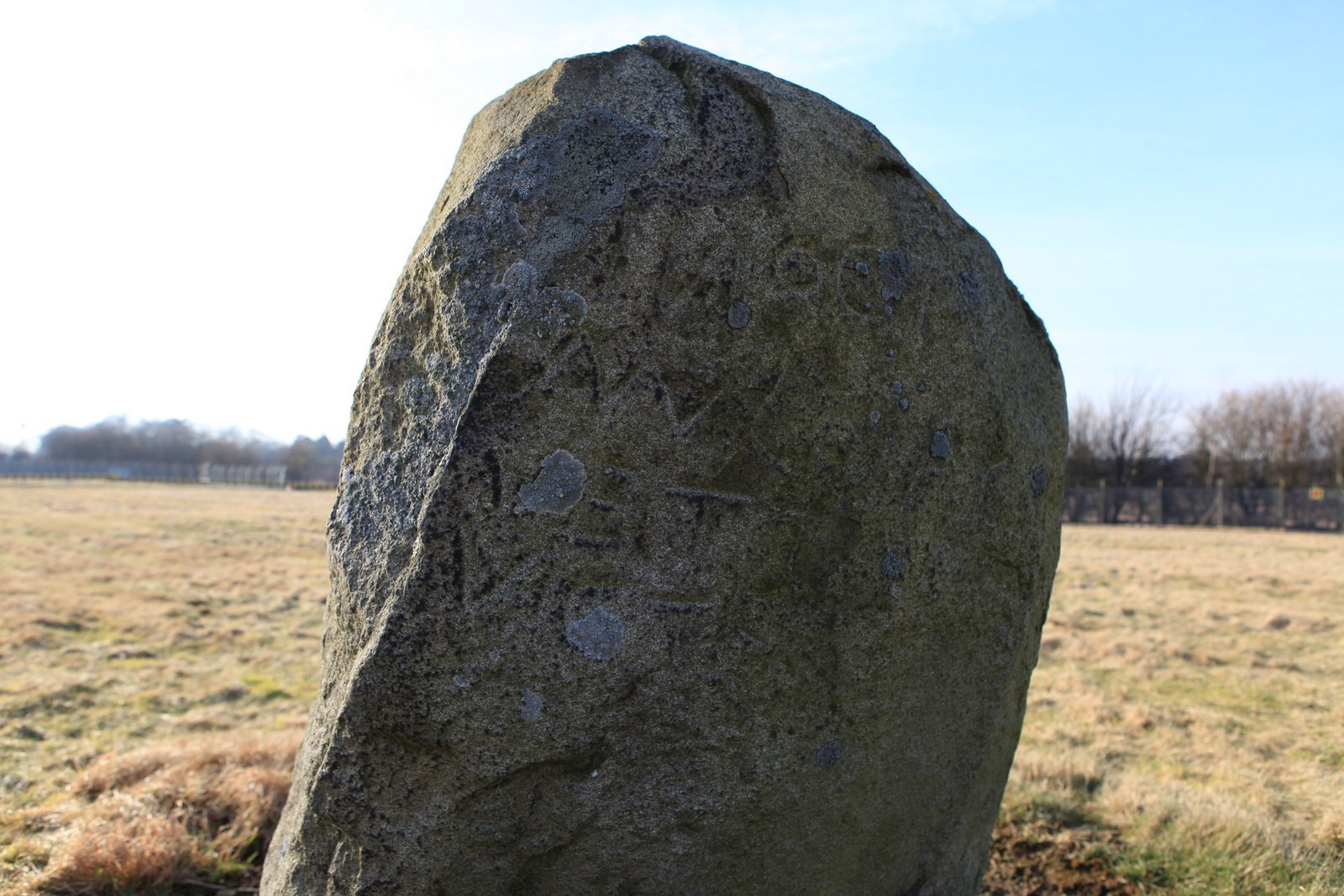
Inscription on the stone

== History ==
The earliest description of the Cat Stane was made by the Welsh scholar Edward Lhuyd in 1699 who described it as standing on a pavement of flat stones surrounding the remains of a low oval cairn.

The first excavation of the stone's vicinity was conducted in 1860. Further excavation took place in 1864 and, most recently, 1977 when it was unsuccessfully proposed that the stone be removed from the grounds of Edinburgh airport.

These excavations showed that the Cat Stane was surrounded by a series of burials in stone-lined graves known as cists.

RCAHMS interprets the Cat Stane as a Bronze Age site re-used for burials in the fifth or sixth centuries.

== See also ==
- Cat Stones of Scotland
