= Fanny Ayton =

English soprano

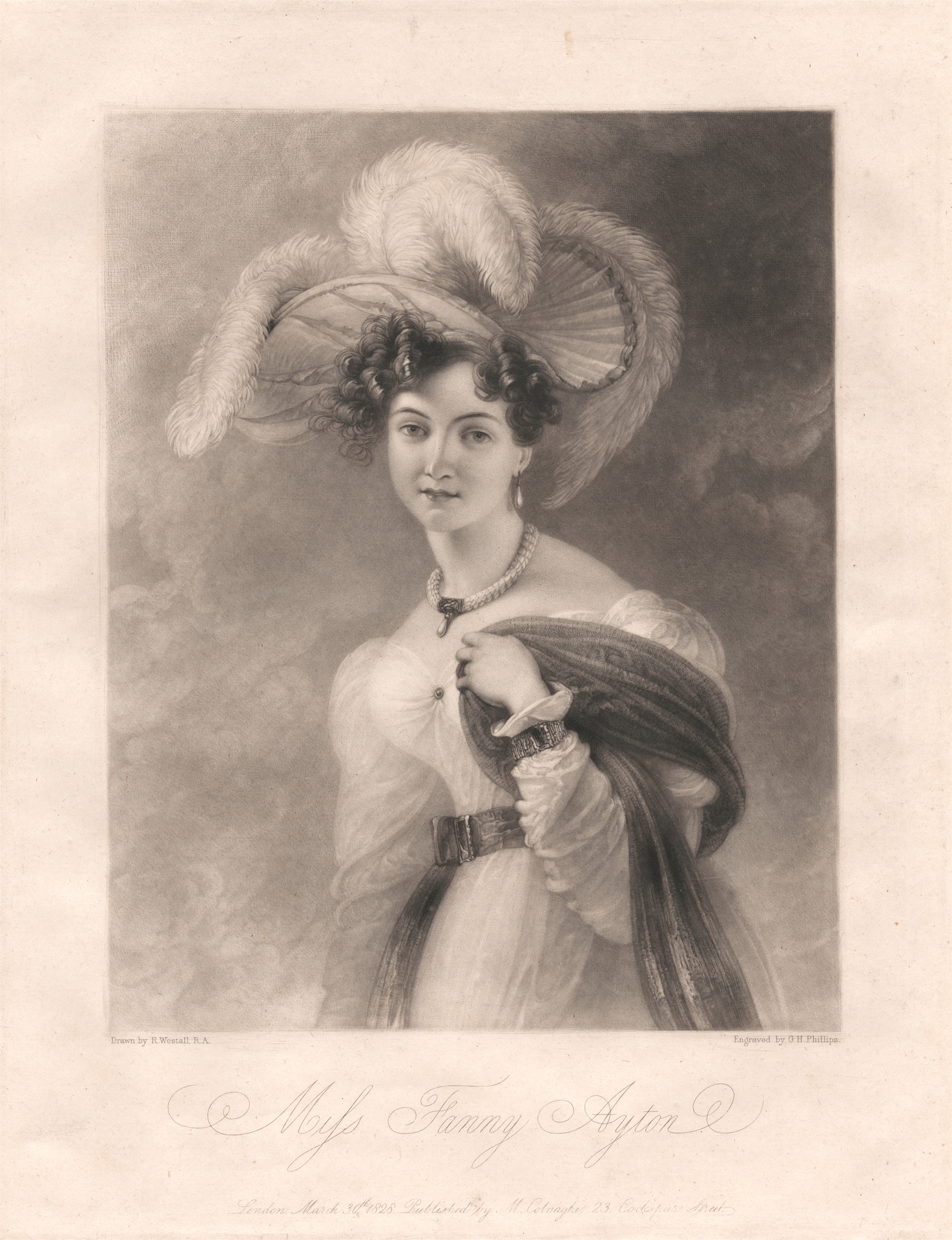
Portrait of soprano Fanny Ayton. Mezzotint by George H. Phillips, after Richard Westall

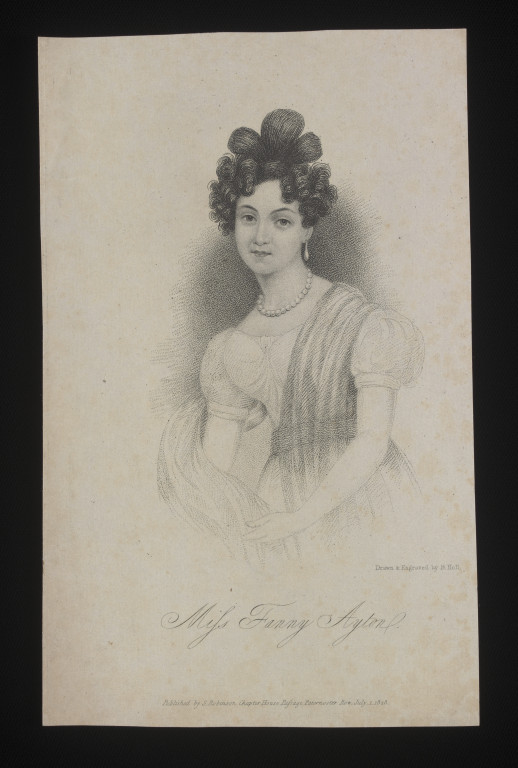
Portrait of Fanny Ayton, engraved by Benjamin Holl

Fanny Ayton (1806–1891) was an English soprano known for her operatic performances in London in the late 1820s.

== Career ==
She was born in Macclesfield. She was taught singing by Manielli at Florence. Her first public appearance, in Italy, was so successfully that John Ebers engaged her for the season of 1827 at the King's Theatre, at a salary of £500. She made her appearances there in two Rossini operas, as Ninetta in La gazza ladra (3 February) and as Fiorilla in Il Turco in Italia. In the same year she sang at Drury Lane in an English version of Il Turco and as Rosetta in Love in a Village. She also played in the provinces, and sang in concerts with fair success. In 1829 she sang at the Birmingham Festival in opera with Maria Malibran and Michael Costa. In 1831 she sang again at the King's Theatre for the season, as Creusa, in Simon Mayr's Medea in Corinto, she appeared for two nights, 20 and 23 December, on the Lincoln Circuit, at Grantham Theatre, and she played Isabel in a version of Robert le diable (The Dæmon, or the Mystic Branch, 21 February 1832).

== Reception ==
According to Henry Chorley, she had considerable execution, a piquancy and taste of her own, a certain ease on the stage, and a great fluency in Italian. But she had the misfortune to compete with some of the greatest Italian singers, and her intonation gave way after her first season.

Sir Walter Scott mentioned her visiting his house with her father in December 1827. He wrote, "A very sweet pretty looking young lady, the Prima Donna of the Italian Opera, now performing here, by name of Miss Ayton, came to breakfast this morning with her father...Miss Ayton talks very prettily, and I dare say, sings beautifully, though too much in the Italian manner, I fear, to be a great favourite of mine. But I did not hear her, being called away".

A portrait of her, drawn and engraved by Benjamin Holl, was published on 1 July 1828.

== Family life ==
Ayton married James Barlow in Liverpool in July 1833. In the 1861 Census of Lewisham she is living at 1 Park Road, Lewisham with her husband and daughter Adele Fanny Barlow. Ayton was described as a widow in the 1871 Census of Marylebone. She died in Dover on 21 May 1891 aged 89.
