= Silverwood, Ayrshire =

Coordinates: 55°37.111′N 4°26.834′W

The location of the old Silverwood Estate, East Ayrshire

Silverwood in the Parish of Kilmarnock lies in East Ayrshire, Scotland. This was once a small estate with a mansion house; it is now a farm. The plantation nearby is named after it.

== History ==
=== The estate ===
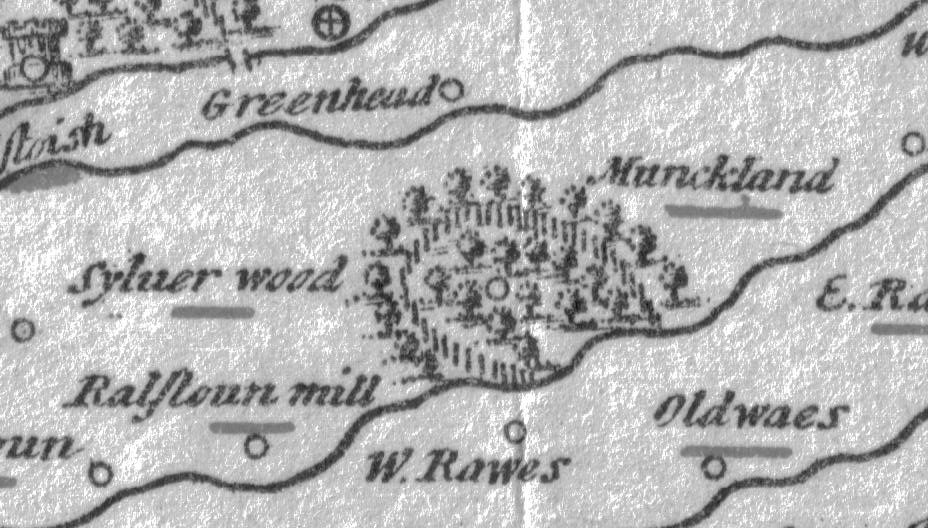
Silverwood circa 1654 by Timothy Pont.

Timothy Pont's map of circa 1654 (See illustration) shows 'Sylverwood' with wooded policies and a pale encircling it on three sides, the Templeton Burn forming the boundary to the West. The land is referred to in 1691 as being the three pound land of old extent. In circa 1640 Hew Montgomerie of Silverwood was one of the rentallers of Grougar and the valuation was £76 9s 4d.

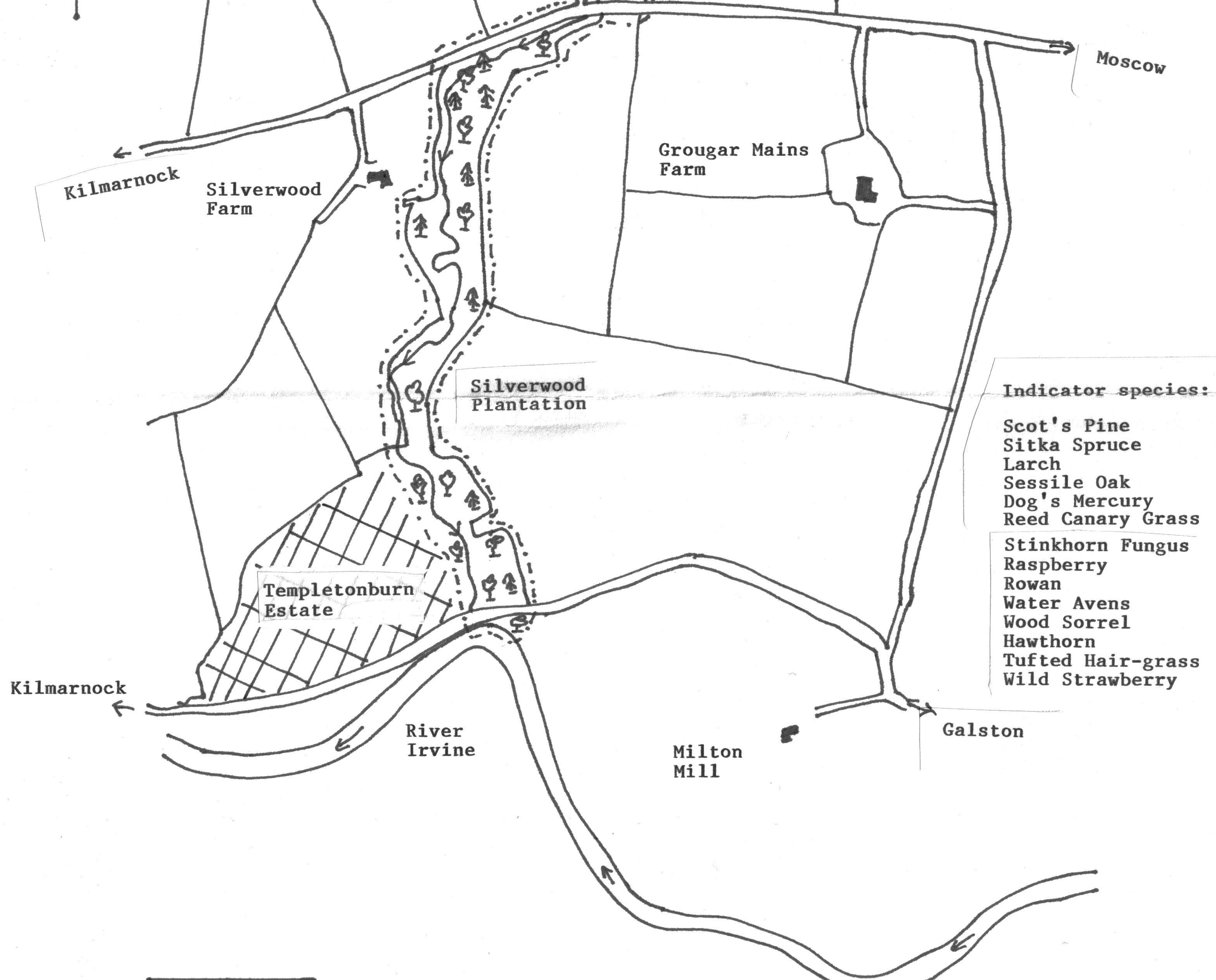
A map showing the site of Silverwood.

The lands in 1640 lay in the Bailliary of Kilwinning and the regality of Torphichen; regality being defined as a territorial jurisdiction of a royal nature conferred by the sovereign, here the jurisdiction was over lands which had belonged to the Knights Templar. The regality was called Temple-Cuninghame.

Hew (Hugh) Montgomerie of Silverwood was the brother of Robert Montgomerie of Hessilhead and in 1672 he was heir to the hereditary bailieship of all the Temple lands and tenements within the Bailiary of Cuninghame and regality of Kilwinning. He was Sheriff Depute of Renfrewshire and as such was involved in a number of contemporary court cases. Hugh's wife was a Helen Tran and his son was Alexander Montgomerie. Hugh stood as a witness to his brother being invested in the Barony of Giffen on 19 June 1663.

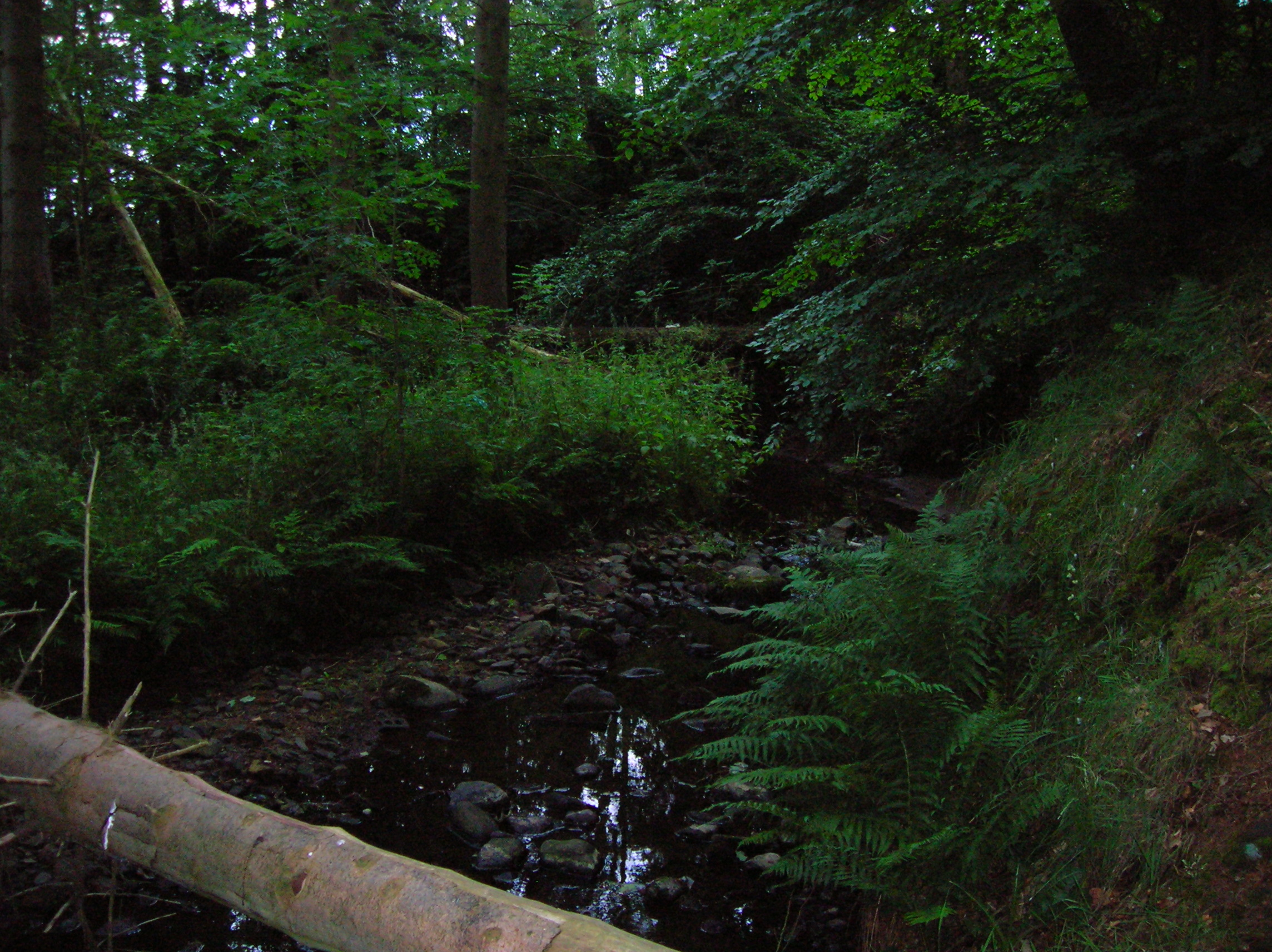
The Templeton Burn in the Armsheugh Plantation near Crookedholm.

Temple-Cuninghame was a tenandry in that the land and other property, etc. was let for rent, rather than retained in the superior’s own hands. In 1614 Hugh had given a bell to Beith (Old Kirk), inscribed THIS . BELL . WAS . GIVEN . BY . HUGH MONTGOMERIE . SON . TO . HESSILHEAD . ANNO . 1614 .

In 1691 John Cuming was laird of Silverwood. He was the son of Matthew Cuming, a merchant in Glasgow, and held the lands at an annual rent of £78 16s 5d. His mother was Jean Howatt to whom the lands had passed via her grandfather, James Howatt. The Hearth Tax records for this year show the 'Lands of Silverwood' had ten dwellings; one hearth each for Silverwood and Templeton, four for Milton.

Aiton records that Silverwood Farm was 73 acres in extent and prior to 1776 was leased for £5 and 5 bolls of meal per annum for a 19 year period; it had risen to £200 per annum in 1811.

By 1876 the lands of Silverwood had become part of the estates belonging to the Duke of Portland. The 6 inch OS maps of the 19th century show a formal laid out garden with a nearby orchard.

Silverwood Farm is now (2008) privately owned.

William Aiton (sheriff), author in the early 1800s of ‘A Treatise on Moss-earth’; ‘General View of the Agriculture of the County of Ayr’; ‘General View of the Agriculture of the County of Bute’; ‘A History of the Rencounter at Drumclog and Battle at Bothwell Bridge’; ‘An Inquiry into the Pedigree of the Hamilton Family’; and an ‘Inquiry into the House of Aiton in Scotland,’ was from Silverwood.

=== Silverwood ===
It is not certain how the name arose, however the name may indicate a link to Silver Birch trees which give a silver appearance, especially in winter, at a distance. This species would have predominated in the Templetonburn Glen as the typical climatic vegetation for this habitat when the area was less well drained and free from artificial plantings.

== Natural history of the Templeton burn and Silverwood ==
The Silverwood and Hillhouse plantations make up the Templetonburn Wildlife Site which as the map shows, contains a good biodiversity, despite the predominance of pine trees, especially Scots Pine, in many areas. Species include Roe deer, Enchanter's Nightshade, oak, blackthorn, bracken, Stinkhorn fungus (Phallus impudicus) and the Oak apple Gall, unusual in the Scottish context. Buzzards are found here, the rotten pine trunks show much woodpecker activity and badgers setts are present; the badgers clearly being persecuted by unknown persons (2008). The Templetonburn joins the River Irvine shortly after leaving the wood. The wood contains what appears to be the remains of an old march dyke and several depressions within the site are suggestive of old limestone workings.

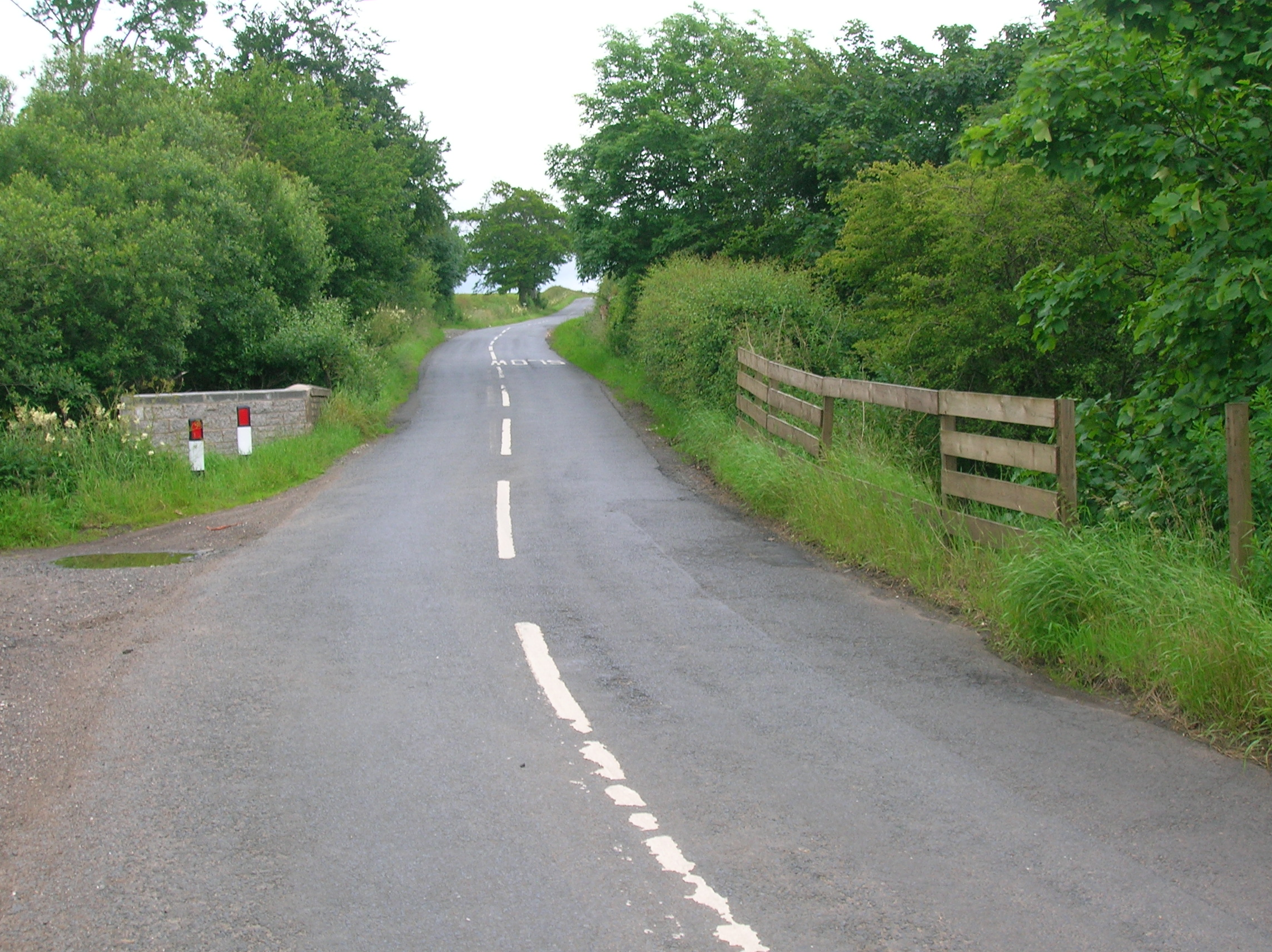
Silverwood Bridge looking towards Grougar Mains.

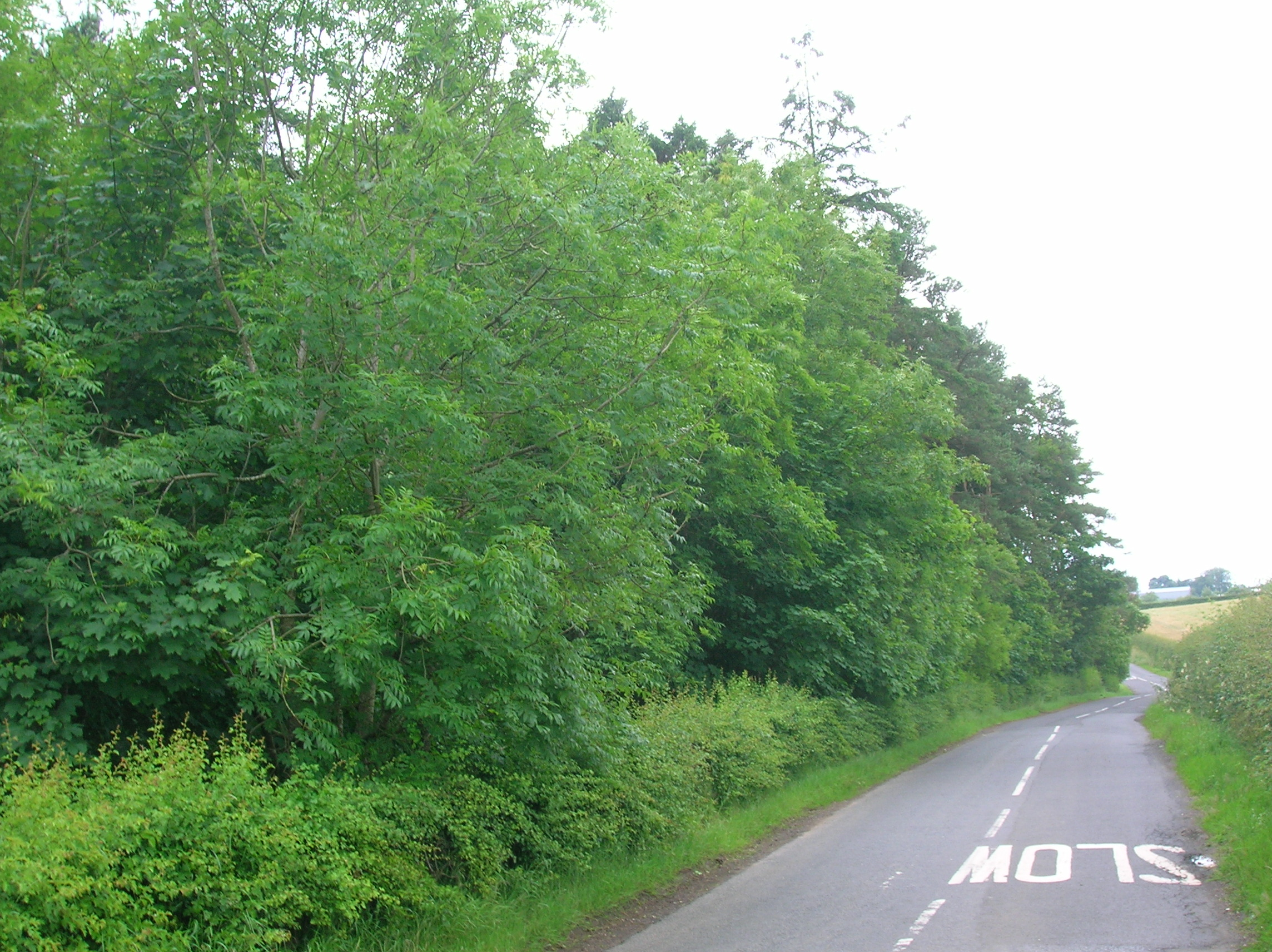
Silverwood Road looking towards Kilmarnock.

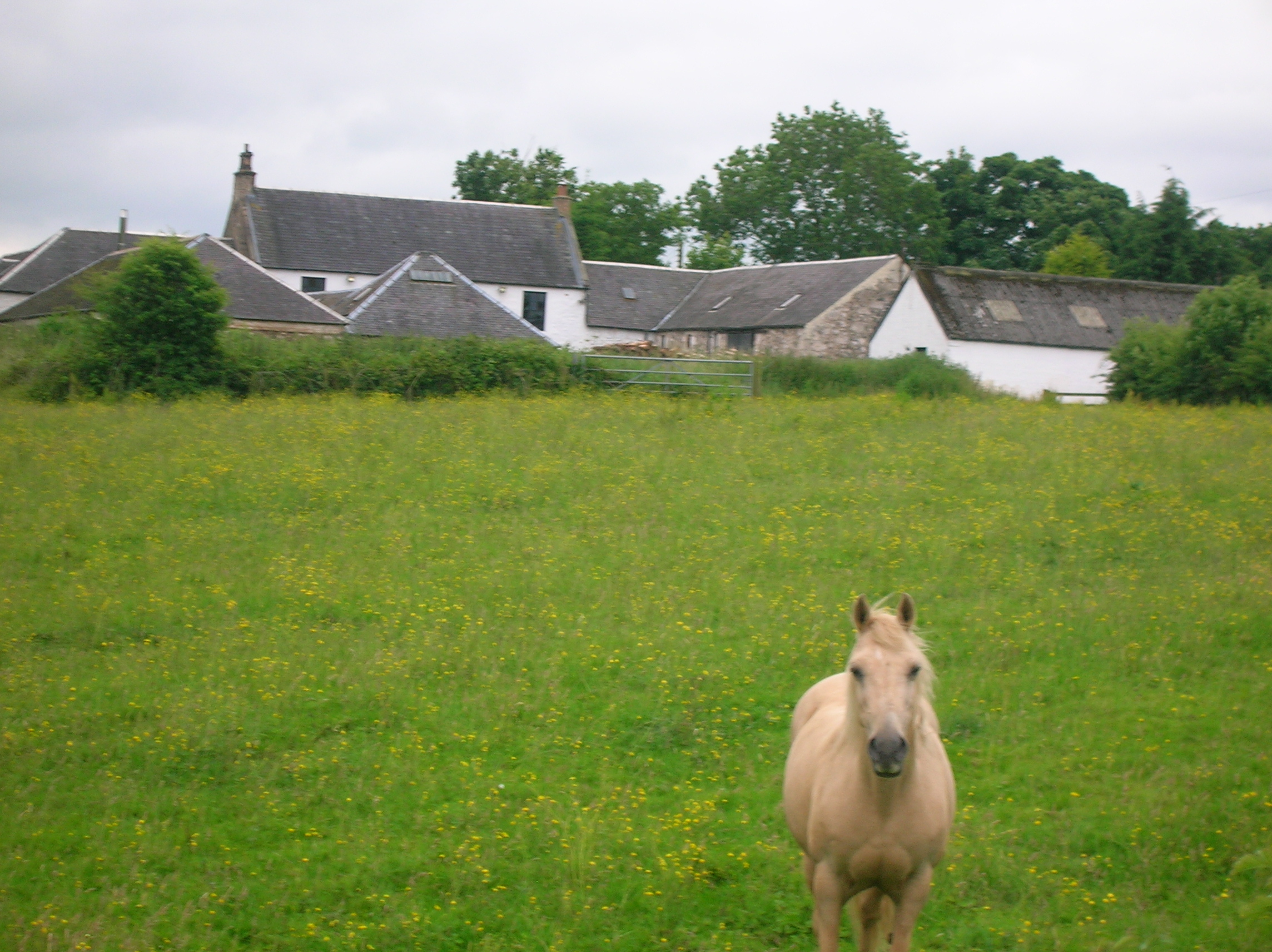
Silverwood Farm from the main road.

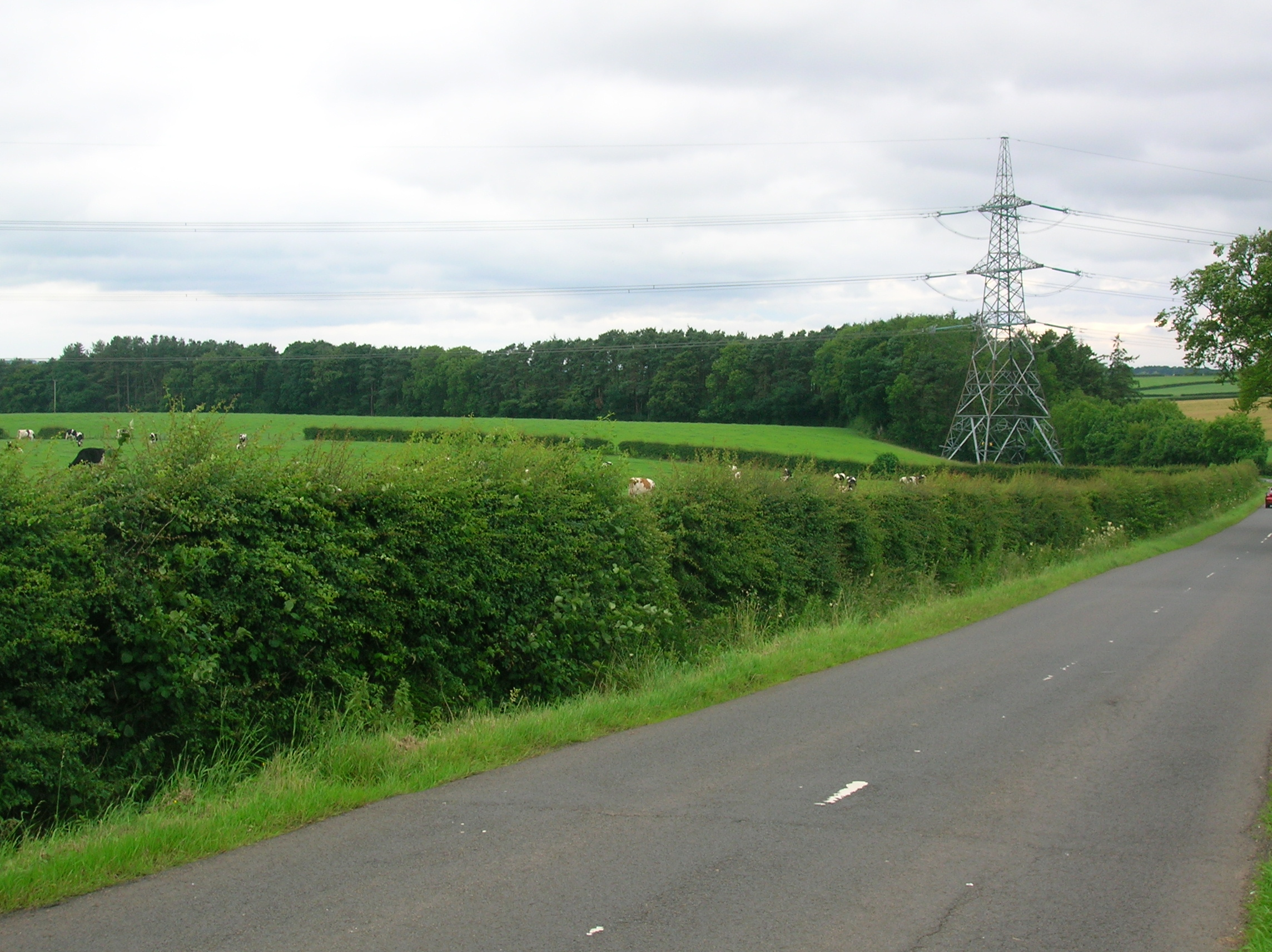
Silverwood Plantation from Grougar Mains.
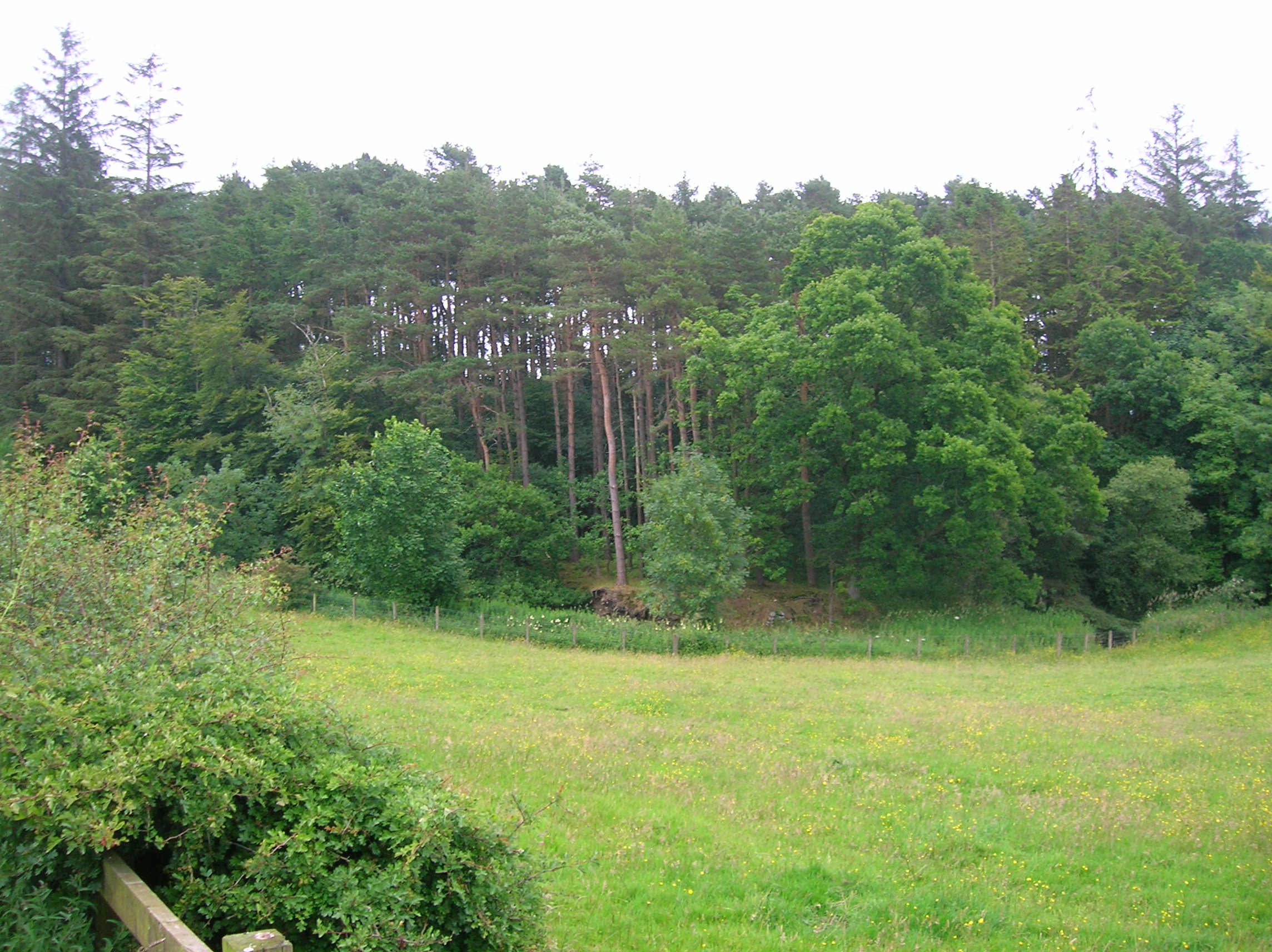
A Scots Pine section of Silverwood seen from the farm entrance.

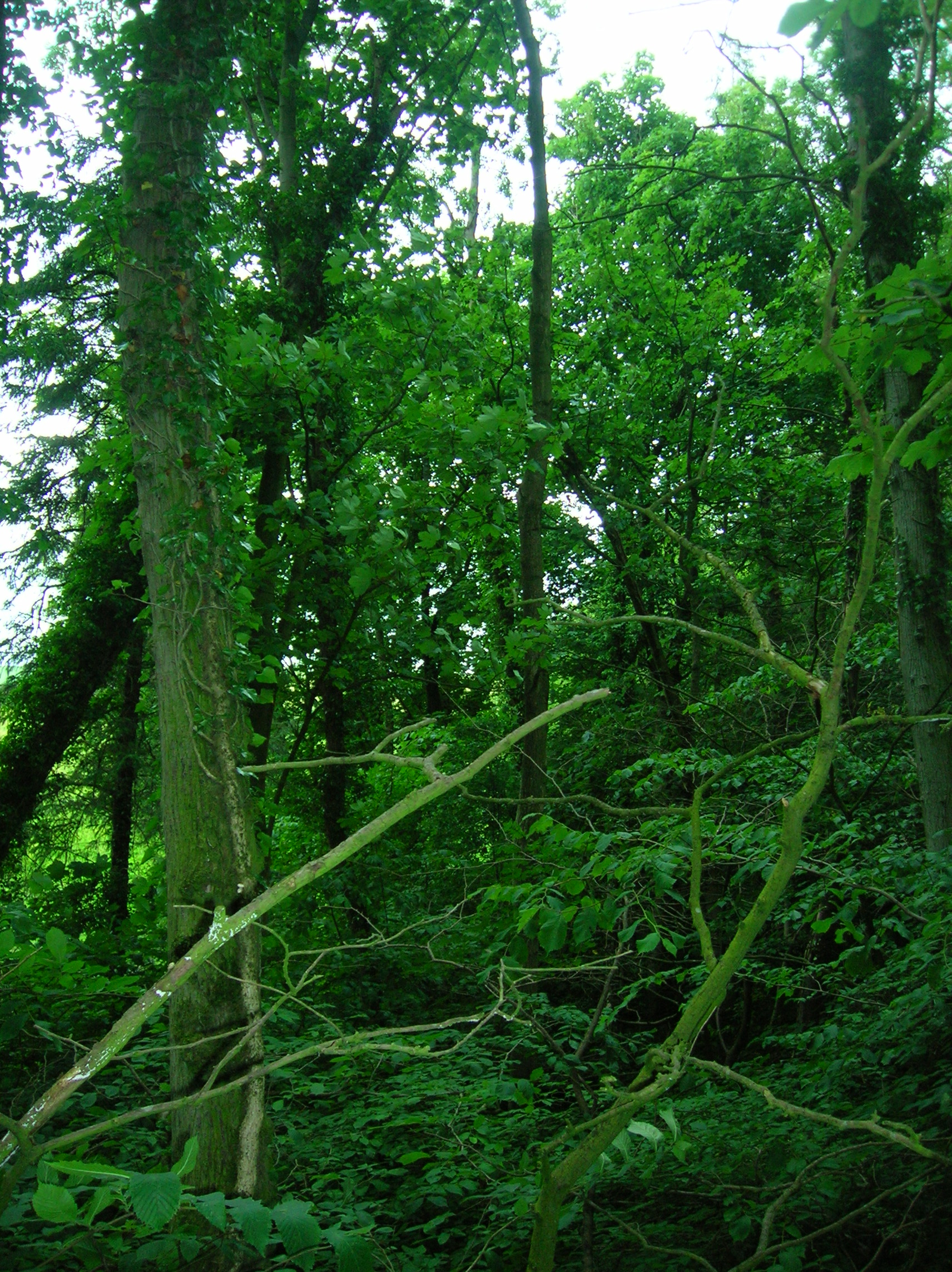
A 'deciduous' section within the Silverwood Plantation.

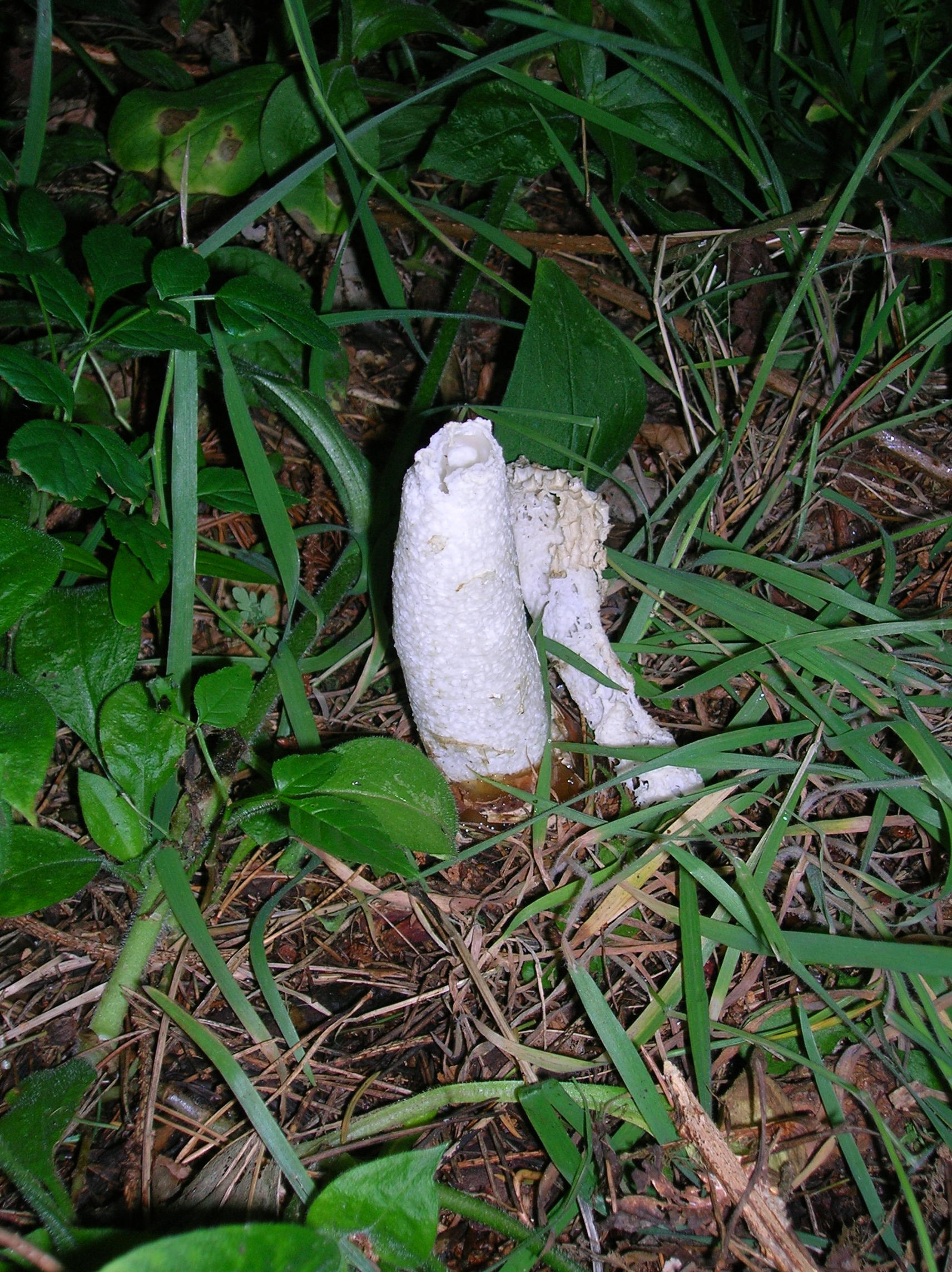
The remains of a Stinkhorn fungus from Silverwood in July 2008.

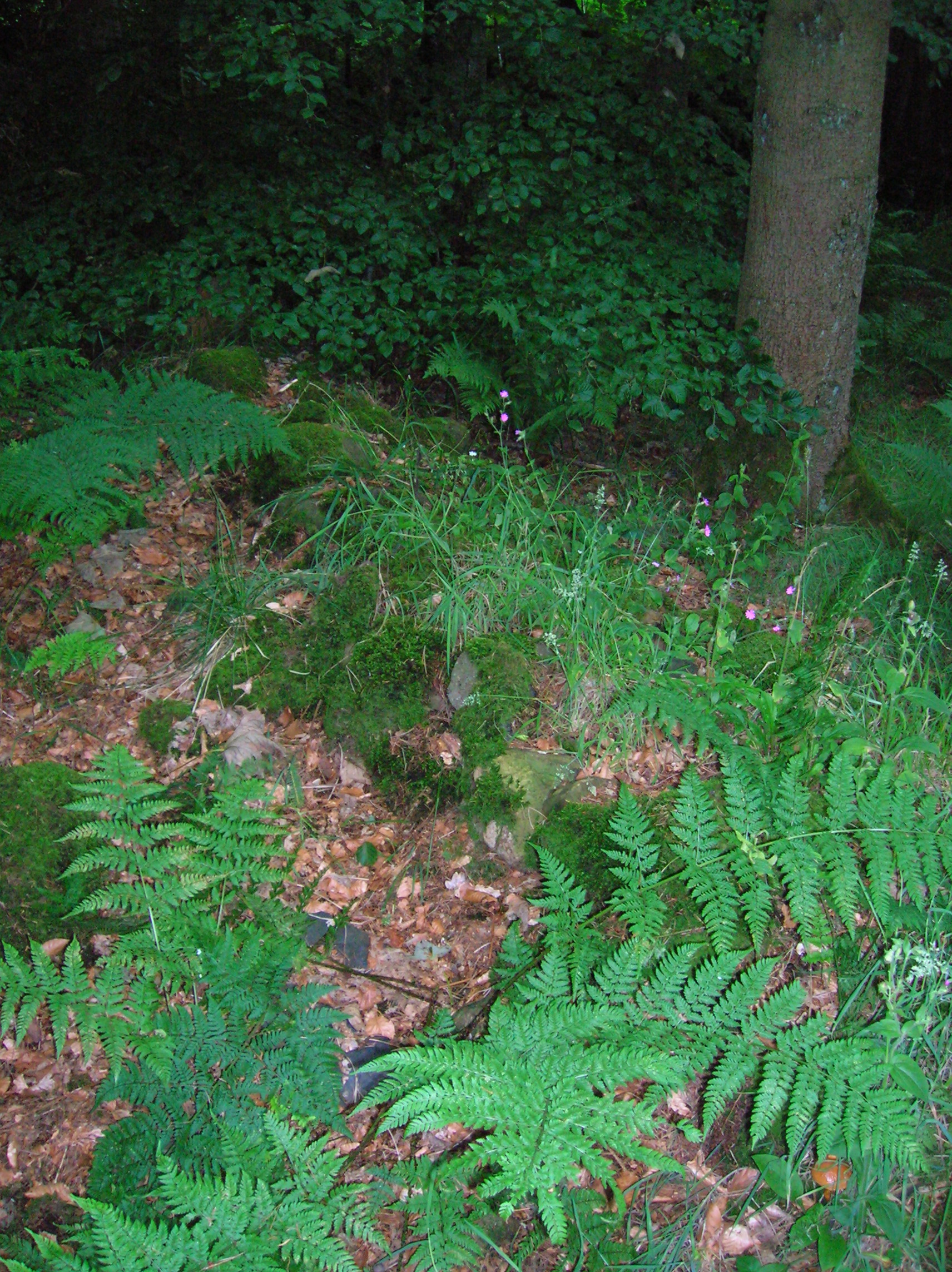
Moss covered stones of the possible march dyke near the main road.

== Templetonburn ==
Several properties of this name have existed nearby over the years. The 1901 Templetonburn House was designed by James K. Hunter and was one of his finest works. It was destroyed by fire shortly before it was due to open as a hotel.

== Grougar ==
This was a valuable Barony, linked to Lambroughton through it having been part of the possessions of the De Morvilles up until the time of King Robert the Bruce. In 1320 Sir Robert Cuninghame of Kilmaurs held the lands and later the Logans of Restalrig came into possession. William Blane of Grougar held the lands in 1876. The present Baron of Grougar is Professor David Ian McLean. The property of 2,000 acres (8.1 km^{2}) never seems to have had a manor house built upon it. Grougar Mains Farm borders the East side of Silverwood plantation.

The Scottish feudal barony of Grougar contained 70 acres of the lands of Caprickhill, including Holmhead and Miltonmill. In 1742 these lands had belonged to Thomas Millar and were sold to William Wallace for £170; in 1811 the properties were worth £7,000. Laighmilton also lay in Grougar and in 1766 its rental was 1s 8d per acre, rising to £4 per acre in 1811.
