= Aytoun =

Aytoun is a surname of Scottish origin. Notable people with the surname include:

- Andrew Aytoun (died 1547), Scottish soldier and engineer
- George Aytoun (born 1880), Scottish footballer
- Robert Aytoun (1570–1638), Scottish poet
- Roger Aytoun (died 1810), British soldier
- Roger Sinclair Aytoun (1823–1904), Scottish politician
- William Edmondstoune Aytoun (1813–1865), Scottish poet, humorist, and writer

== See also ==
- Aiton (surname)
- Ayton (surname)
