= William Aiton (sheriff) =

Scottish law agent, agriculturalist and sheriff-substitute

William Aiton (9 January 1760 – 8 July 1847) was a Scottish law agent, agriculturalist and sheriff-substitute of the county of Lanark. He was an authority on all matters bearing on Scottish husbandry.

He was born at Silverwood, Kilmarnock, in 1760, a neighbourhood which he left in 1785 to go to Strathaven, Lanarkshire, where he practised for many years as a law agent. He next went to Hamilton, where he held office as one of the sheriff-substitutes of the county from 1816 up to 1822. He died in 1847. At no period did his income exceed a hundred a year, and yet out of this, with a family of twelve children, he educated four sons for liberal professions, often sending them his last guinea when they were students at college.

== Works ==
Aiton's works are:

- A Treatise on Moss-earth, Ayr, 1811.
- General View of the Agriculture of the County of Ayr, Glasgow, 1811.
- General View of the Agriculture of the County of Bute, Glasgow, 1816.
- A History of the Rencounter at Drumclog and Battle at Bothwell Bridge, Hamilton, 1821.
- An Inquiry into the Pedigree of the Hamilton Family, Glasgow, 1827.
- Inquiry into the House of Aiton in Scotland, Hamilton, 1830.
