= Prestonkirk Parish Church =

Church in East Lothian, Scotland

Coordinates: 55.9914°N 2.6555°W

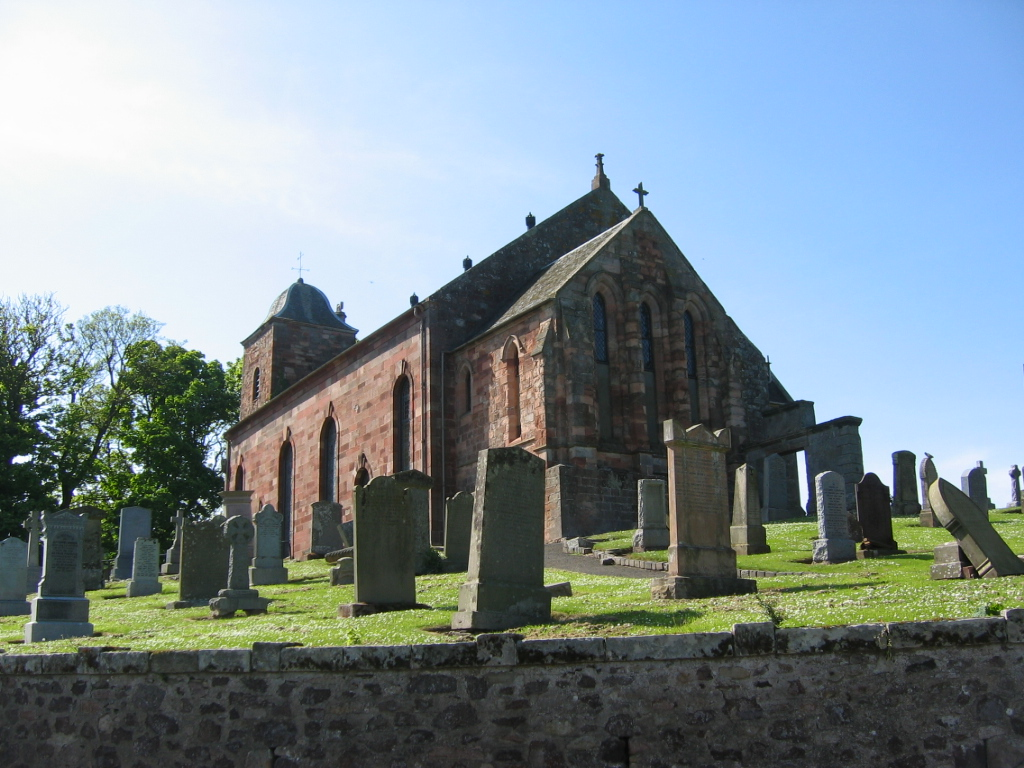
View of Prestonkirk

Prestonkirk Parish Church is a Church of Scotland parish church at East Linton, in the parish of Traprain, East Lothian, Scotland, UK, close to Preston Mill, Smeaton, Phantassie, and the River Tyne.

== Building ==
The original church is said to have been founded by Saint Baldred of Tyninghame, also known as St Baldred of the Bass, in the 6th century. The tower of the present church dates from 1631, and the main building from 1770. It was enlarged in 1824 and the interior was redesigned in 1892. The St Baldred window was installed in 1959.

== Churchyard ==
Amongst the persons buried in Prestonkirk churchyard are:

- Andrew Meikle, the inventor of the threshing machine
- George Rennie, agriculturalist and brother of John Rennie, civil engineer

== Photo gallery ==
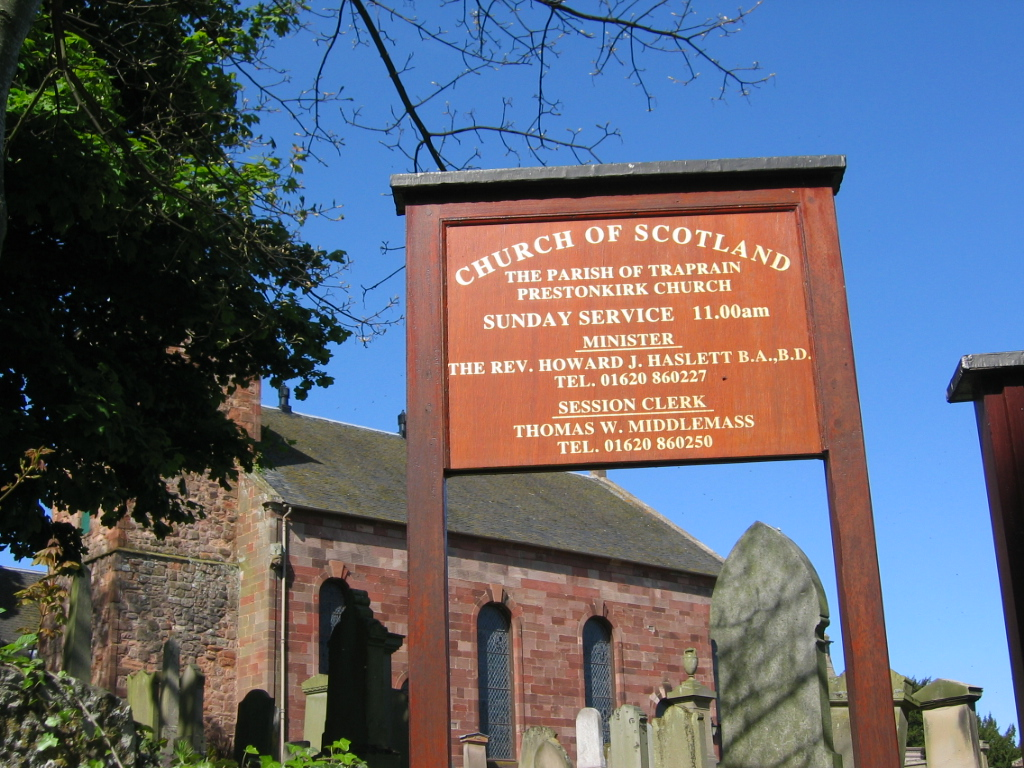
Church of Scotland, The Parish of Traprain, Prestonkirk Church

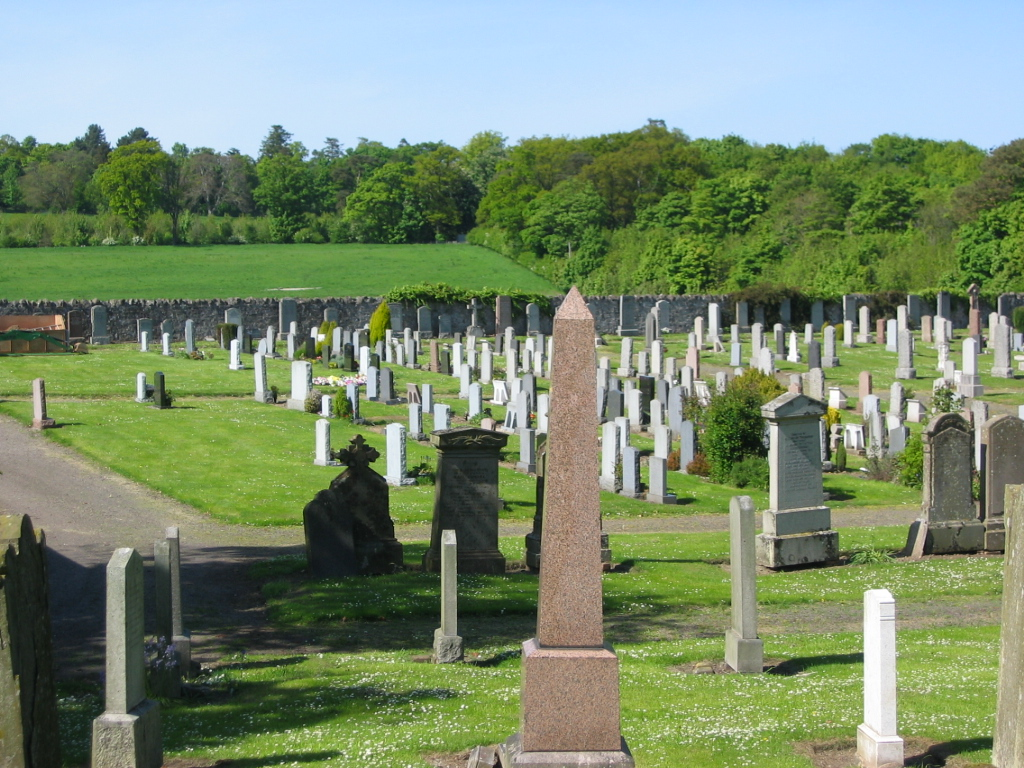
Andrew Meikle, George Rennie and John Rennie are buried here

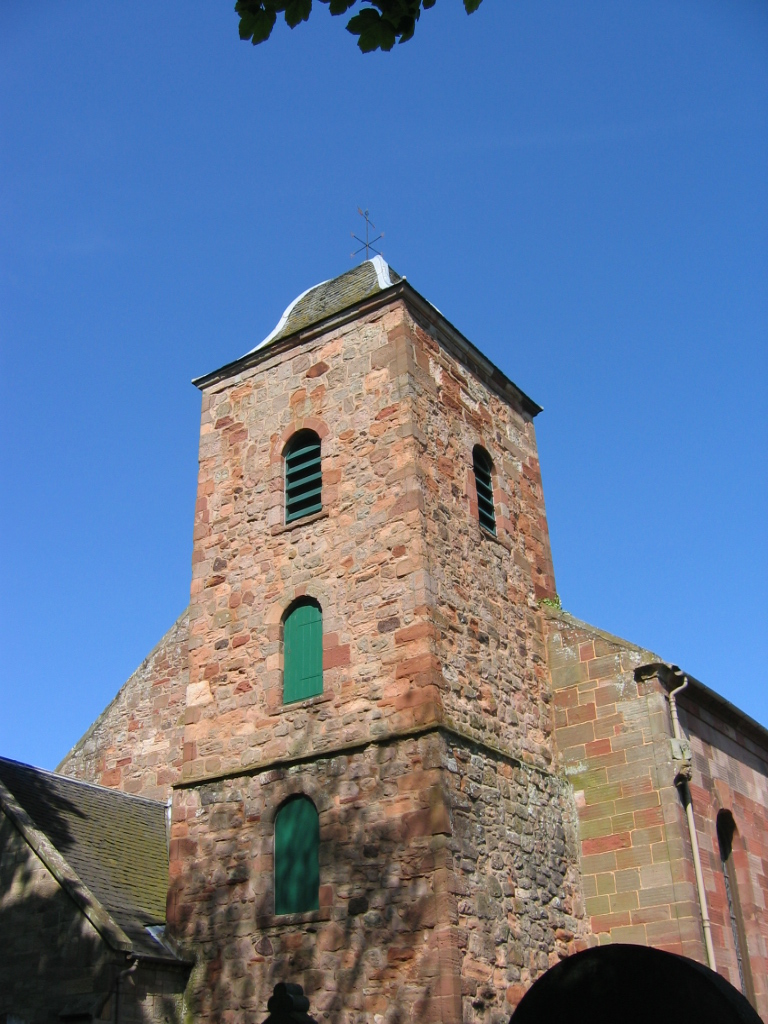
Church tower

== Sources ==
- The monumental inscriptions at Prestonkirk were published by the Scottish Genealogy Society in 2000.
- Local History Society, "By the Linn Rocks", 1999
- Description of building by Chris Tabraham, Principal Inspector of Ancient Monuments with Historic Scotland
