= John Shirreff =

Scottish agricultural writer

John Shirreff (1759–1818) was a Scottish agricultural writer.

== Life ==
Shirreff was the son of an East Lothian farmer. After spending his youth in the West Indies as a merchant, he returned at his father's death, and succeeded to the lease of the farm at Captainhead, Haddington. In 1793 he was chosen, together with two other East Lothian farmers to survey the West Riding of Yorkshire for the county agricultural reports of the Board of Agriculture.

Shirreff attempted agricultural improvements, including a threshing-machine, worked by wind, and a bone-mill. He tried without success to introduce into Scotland the use of bone-dust as fertiliser. After subletting his farm, he resided at Craigside, Abbey Hill, and other places in and around Edinburgh, writing on agricultural topics.

During the last years of his life Shirreff resided in the country, taking charge of the estates of some noblemen. He died 2 November 1818, and was interred in the burial-ground at Prestonkirk, East Lothian.

== Works ==
The survey General View of the Agriculture of the West Riding of Yorkshire (1794) was written by Shirreff with Robert Brown and George Rennie, from the same area as Shirreff. It escaped criticism from William Marshall who compiled a Review of the series. Shirreff went on to compile surveys of Orkney and Shetland (1804).

In 1801 Shirreff received a premium from the Board of Agriculture for an essay on the "Best Mode of cropping Old Pasture Grounds". He contributed to the London Society of Arts an account of the osier plantations on his farm at Captainhead. He wrote pamphlets, and articles in the Farmer's Magazine and Scots Monthly Magazine.

== Notes ==
Attribution

This article incorporates text from a publication now in the public domain: Lee, Sidney, ed. (1897). "Shirreff, John". Dictionary of National Biography. Vol. 52. London: Smith, Elder & Co.
