= River Tyne (disambiguation) =

The River Tyne can refer to three rivers:

- River Tyne, England
- River Tyne, Scotland
- a tributary of the South Esk River in Tasmania
