= Preston Mill =

Watermill in East Lothian, Scotland

Coordinates: 55.99219°N 2.65114°W

Preston
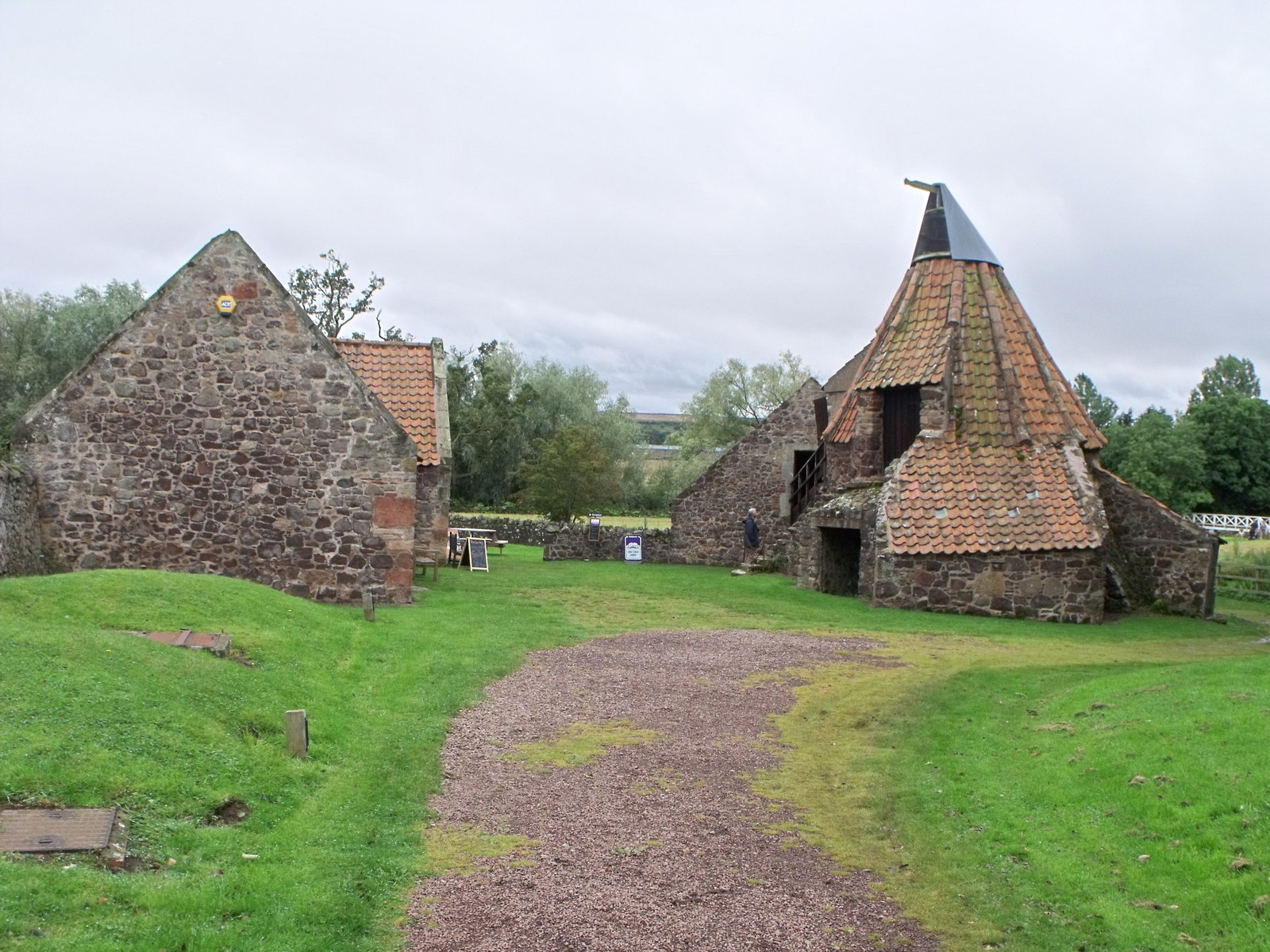
- Preston Mill
- OS grid reference: NT596779
- Civil parish: Prestonkirk
- Council area: East Lothian Council
- Lieutenancy area: East Lothian
- Country: Scotland
- Sovereign state: United Kingdom
- Post town: EAST LINTON
- Postcode district: EH40
- Dialling code: 01620
- Police: Scotland
- Fire: Scottish
- Ambulance: Scottish
- UK Parliament: East Lothian
- Scottish Parliament: East Lothian

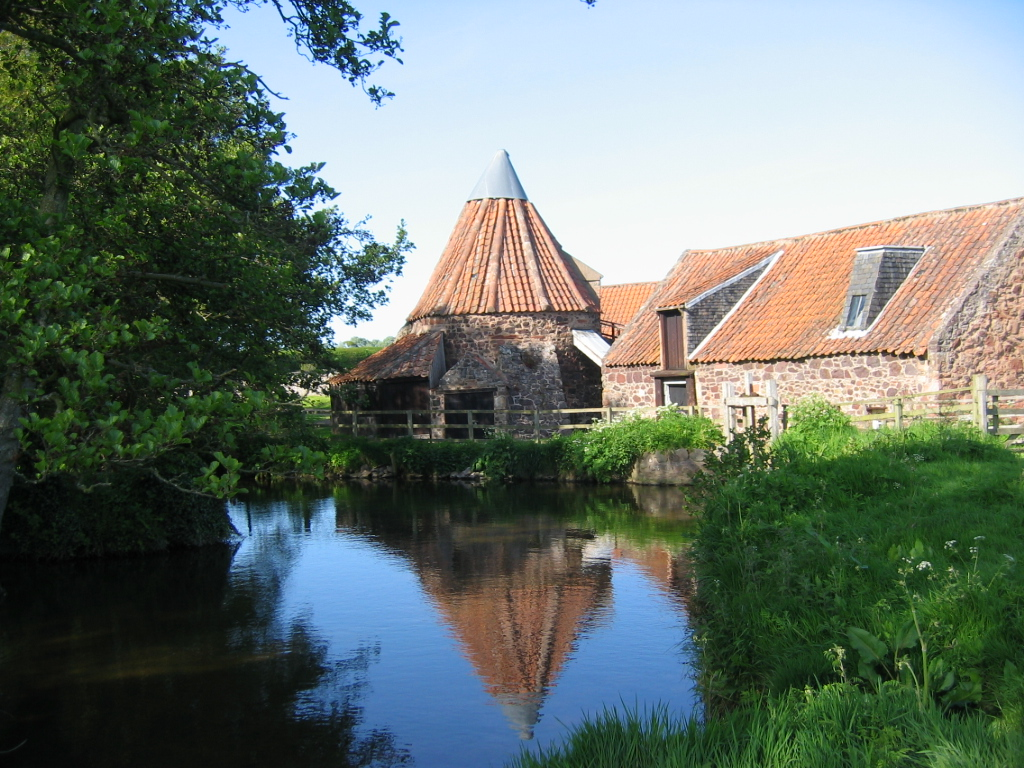
Preston Mill

Preston Mill is a watermill on the River Tyne at the eastern edge of East Linton on the B1407 Preston Road, in East Lothian, Scotland, UK. It is situated close to Prestonkirk Parish Church, the Smeaton Hepburn Estate, Smeaton Lake, and Phantassie Doocot. It is a Category A listed building.

Preston is a hamlet adjacent to East Linton, East Lothian, Scotland.

There has been a mill on the site since the 16th century. The present mill dates from the 18th century and is in the care of the National Trust for Scotland. It was used commercially until 1959, and it produced oatmeal. The River Tyne still drives the water wheel, and the machinery can still be seen at work by visitors taking part in a tour. There is also an exhibition about milling, and a mill pond.

The engineer and millwright Andrew Meikle maintained the mill in the 18th century. In 1948 a flood submerged the buildings, and in 1950 a local land owner gave the mill to the National Trust for Scotland. The milling firm Rank Hovis McDougall provided help with the renovation and expertise to allow the mill to be operative again.

Preston Mill consists of a kiln, a mill, and the miller's house. The mill wheel dates back to 1909. The mill is loved by visitors, painters and photographers, especially the kiln with its conical red pantile roof.

== Photo gallery ==
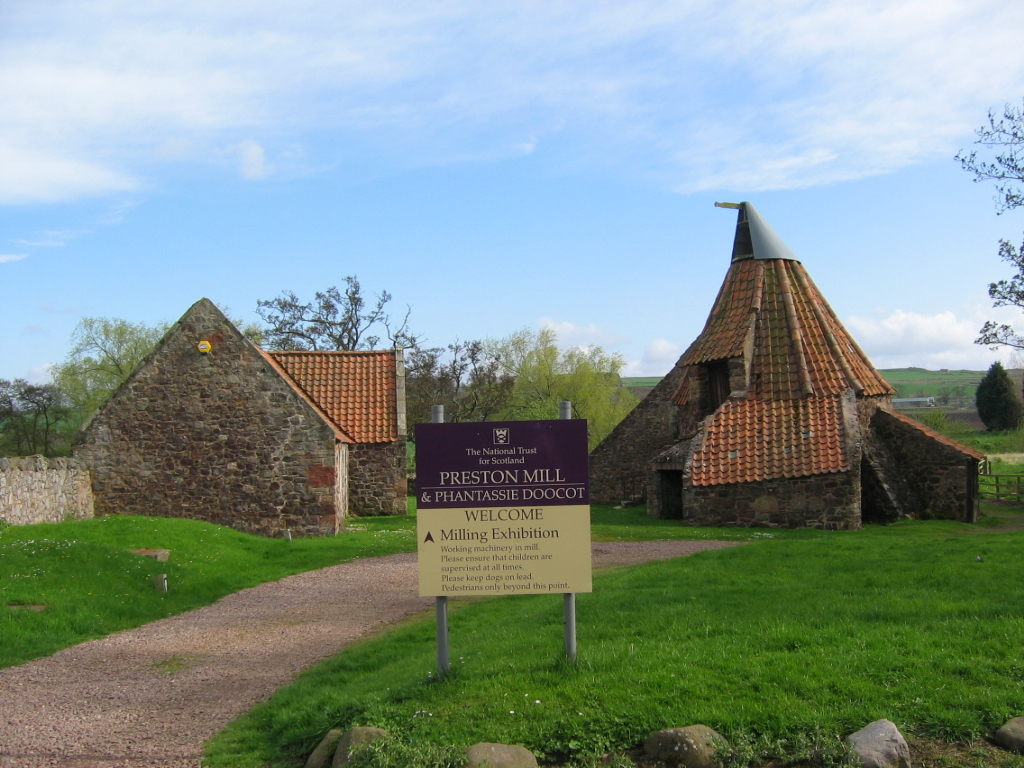
The entrance road to Preston Mill is close to Prestonkirk

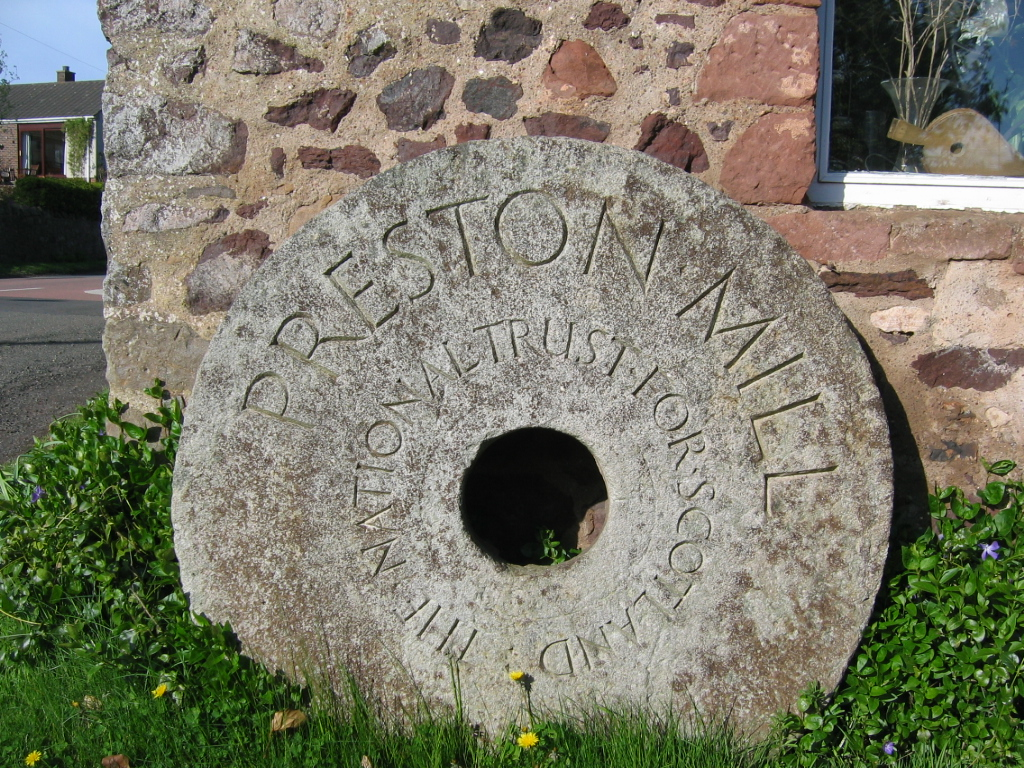
Ornamental millstone with legend: Preston Mill National Trust for Scotland

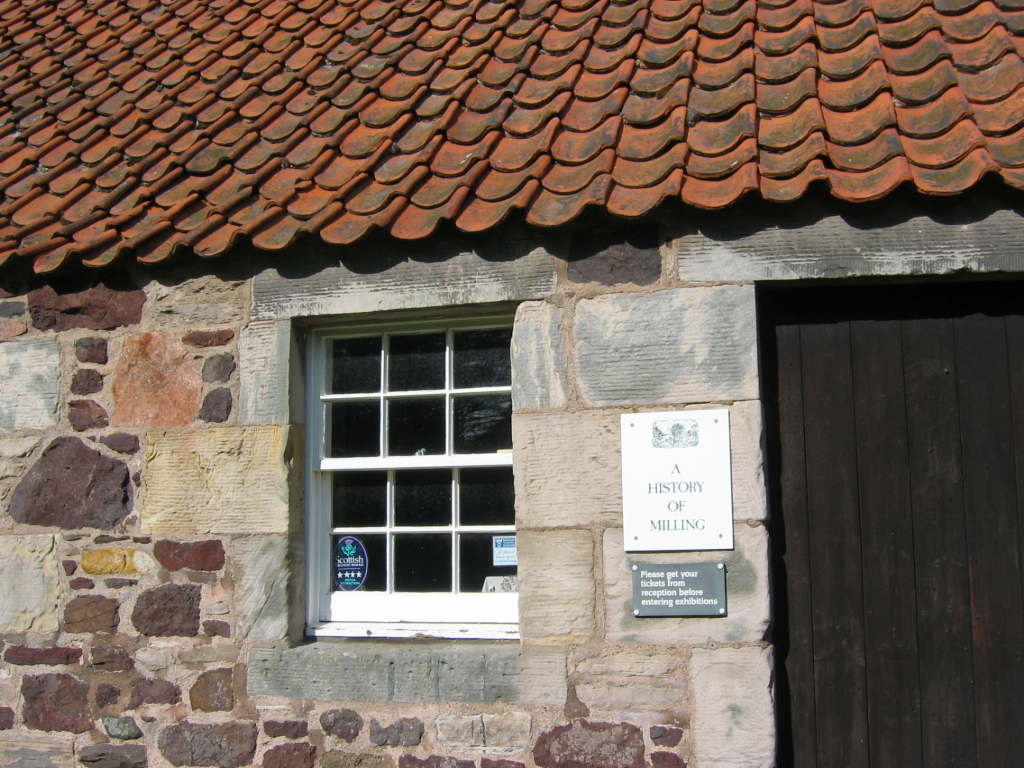
Milling Exhibition

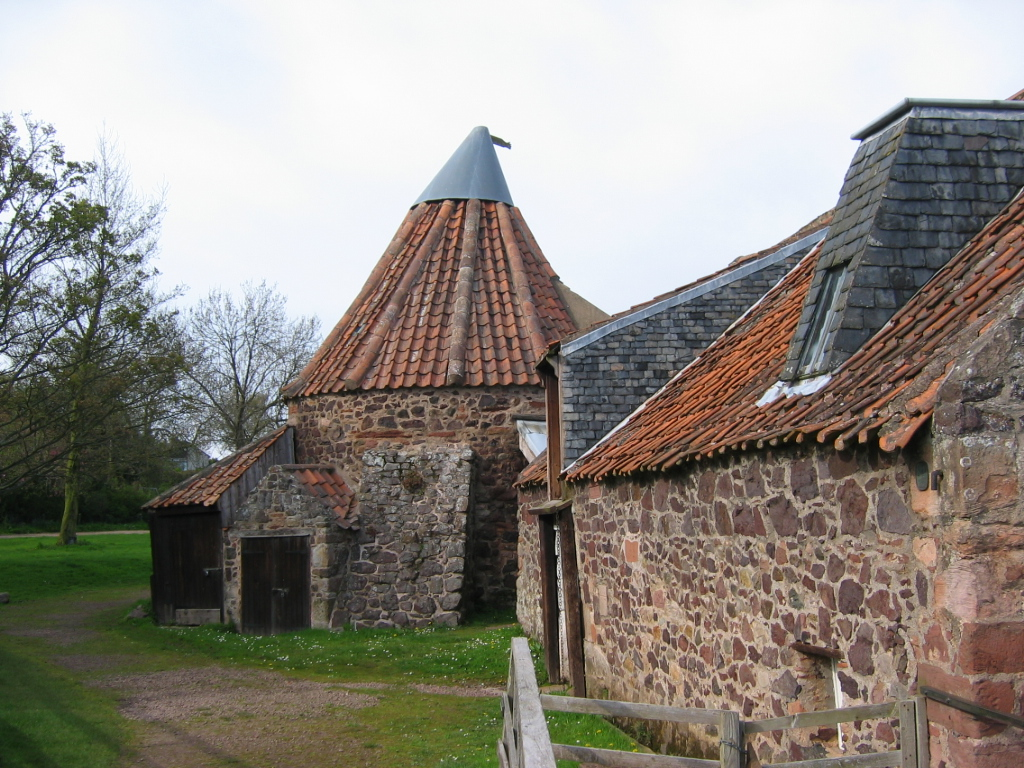
The Kiln

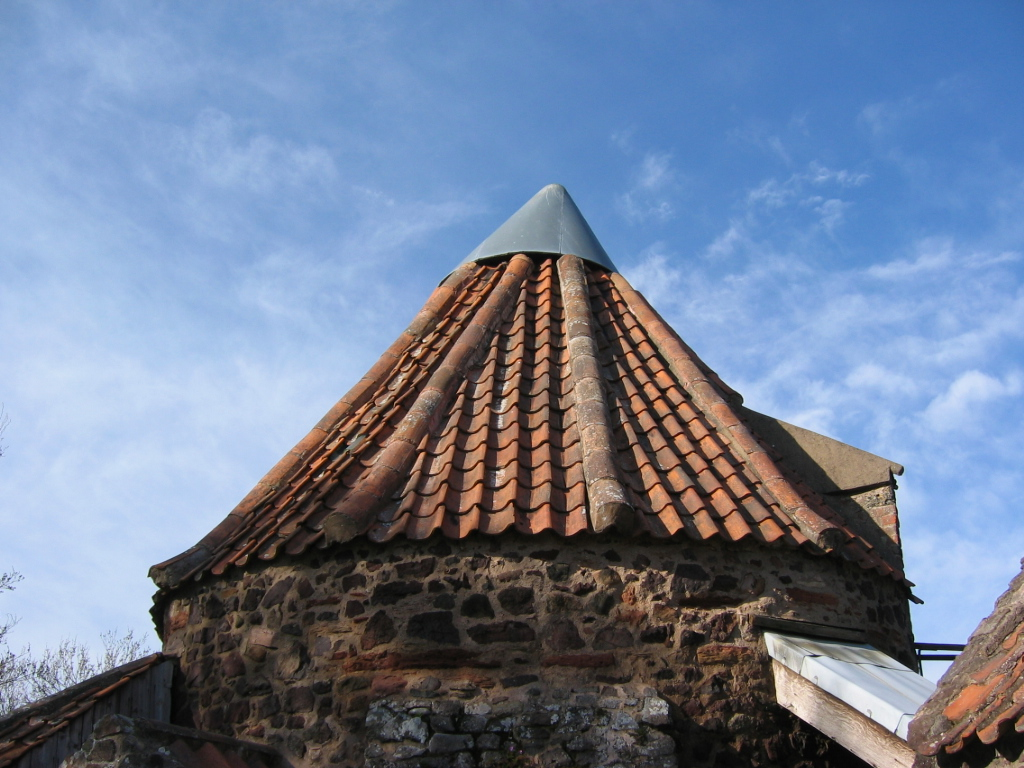
Kiln roof

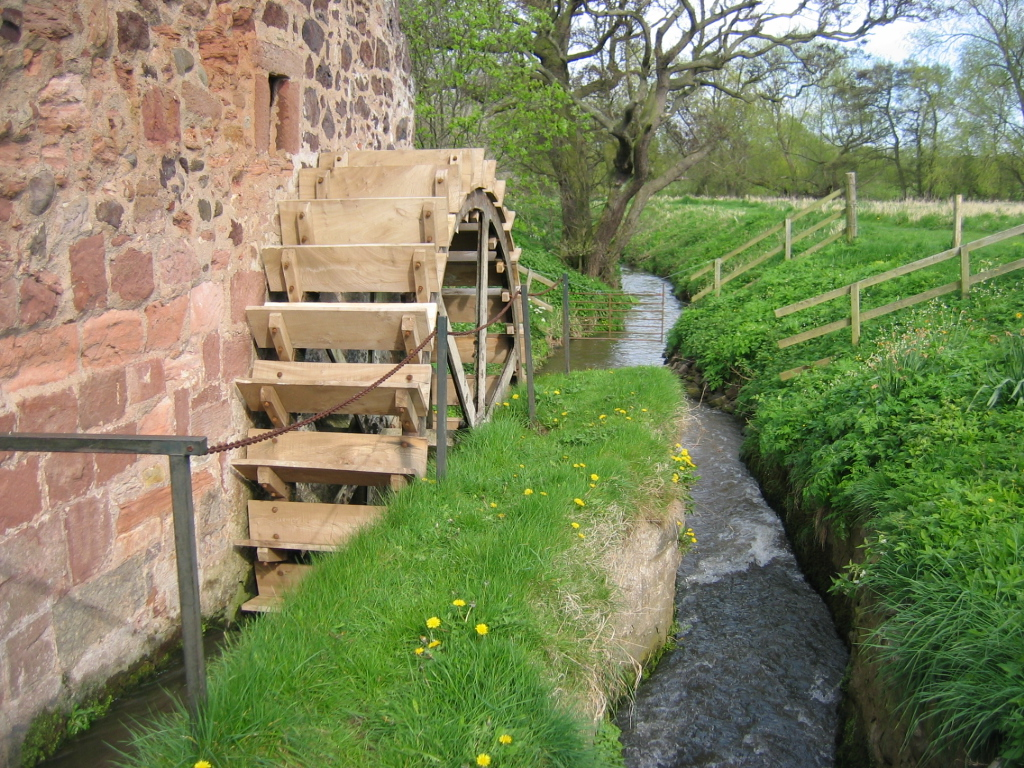
The mill wheel

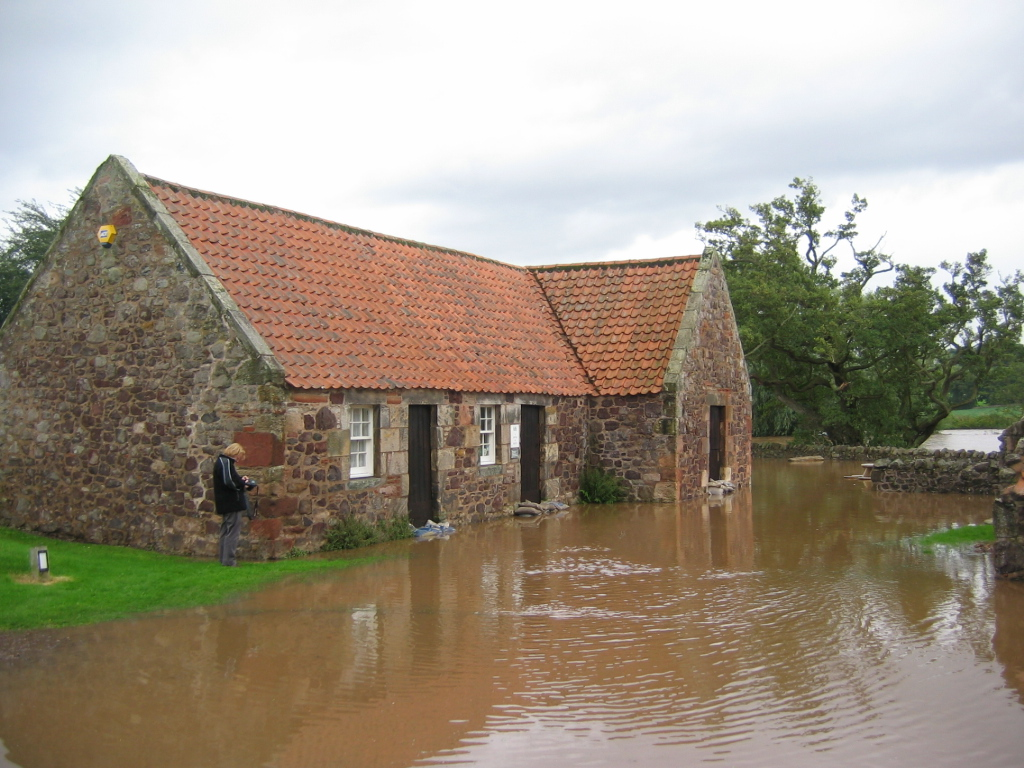
Flooding from the River Tyne

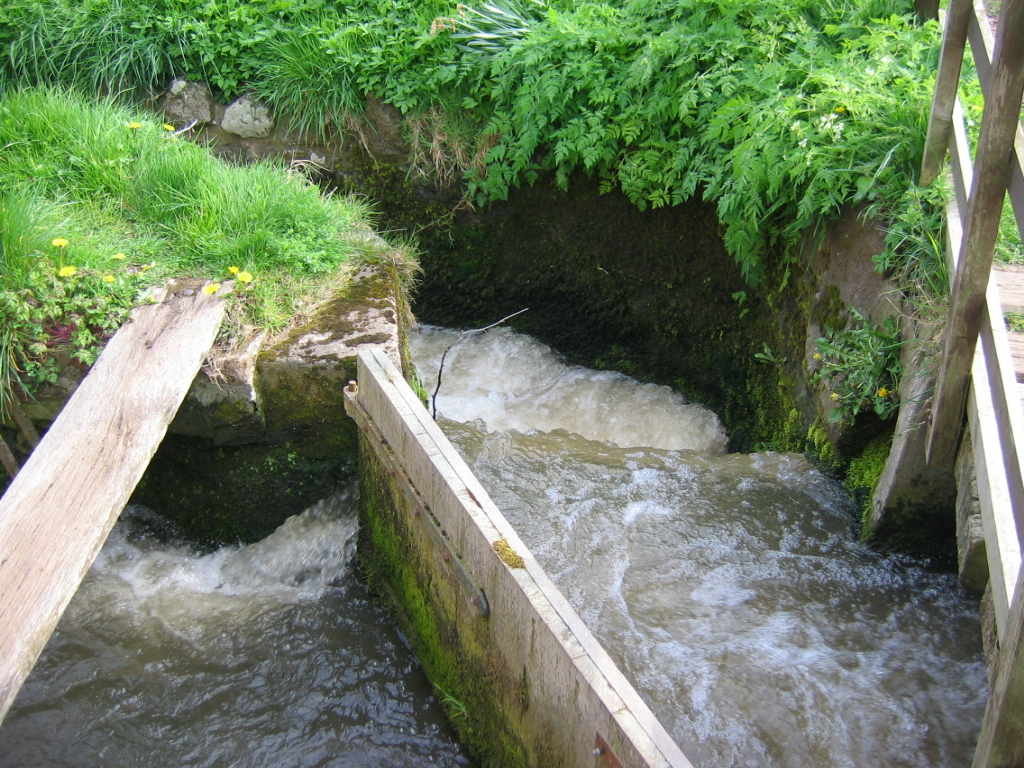
Mill stream and surrounding area prone to floods

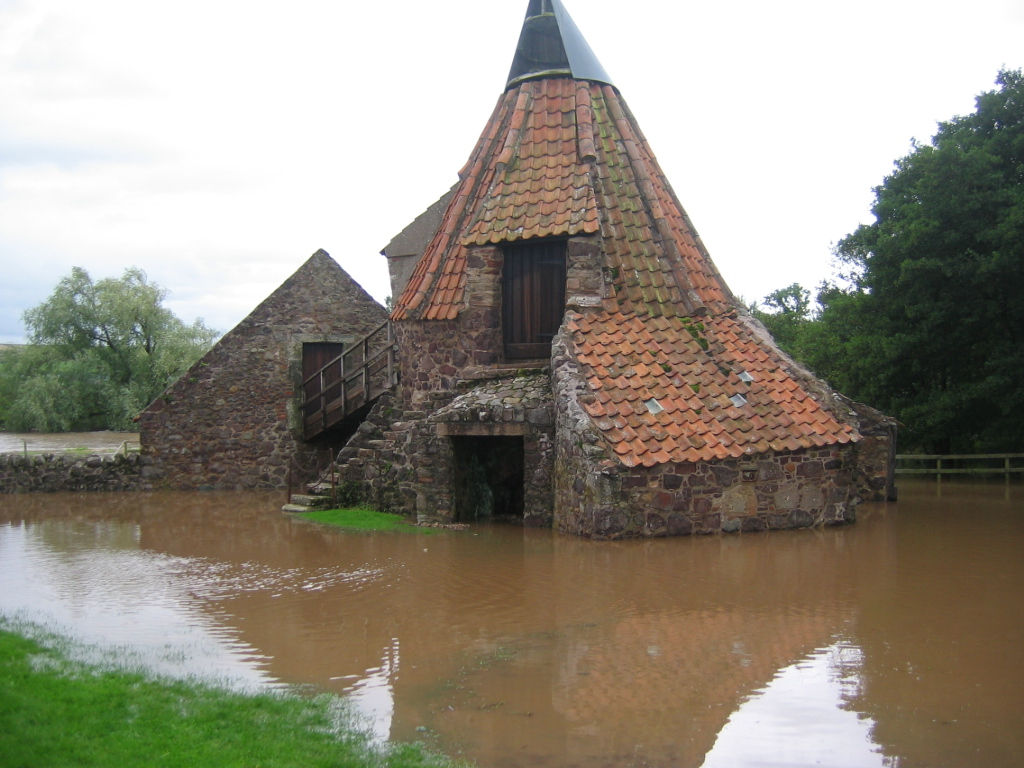
Mill closed due to flooding
