= East Linton =

Village in East Lothian, Scotland

Coordinates: 55.986°N 2.655°W

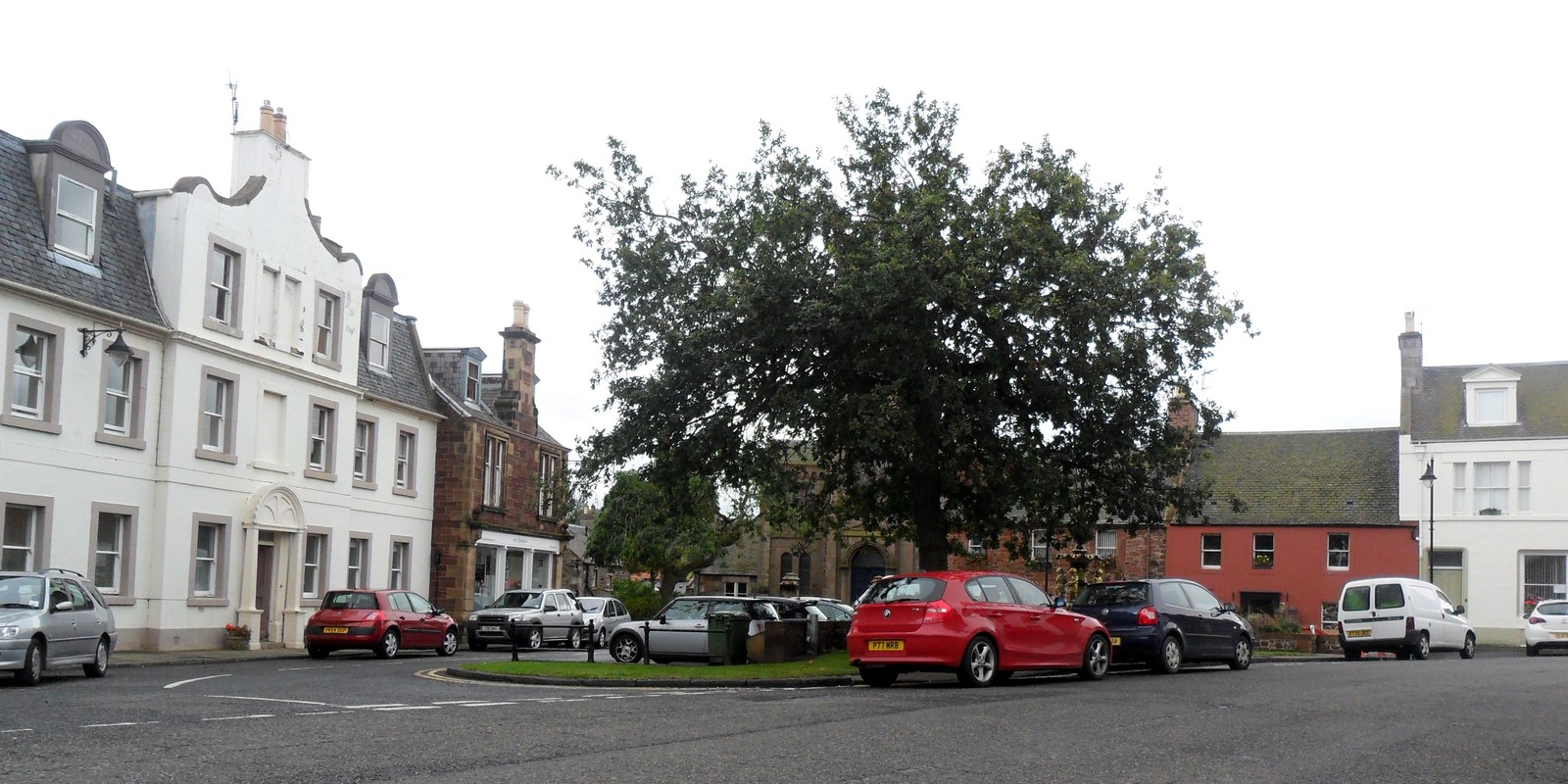
- The Square, East Linton

- Location within East Lothian
- Population: 1,790 (2020)
- OS grid reference: NT591771
- Civil parish: Prestonkirk
- Council area: East Lothian
- Lieutenancy area: East Lothian
- Country: Scotland
- Sovereign state: United Kingdom
- Post town: EAST LINTON
- Postcode district: EH40
- Dialling code: 01620
- Police: Scotland
- Fire: Scottish
- Ambulance: Scottish
- UK Parliament: Lothian East
- Scottish Parliament: East Lothian Coast and Lammermuirs

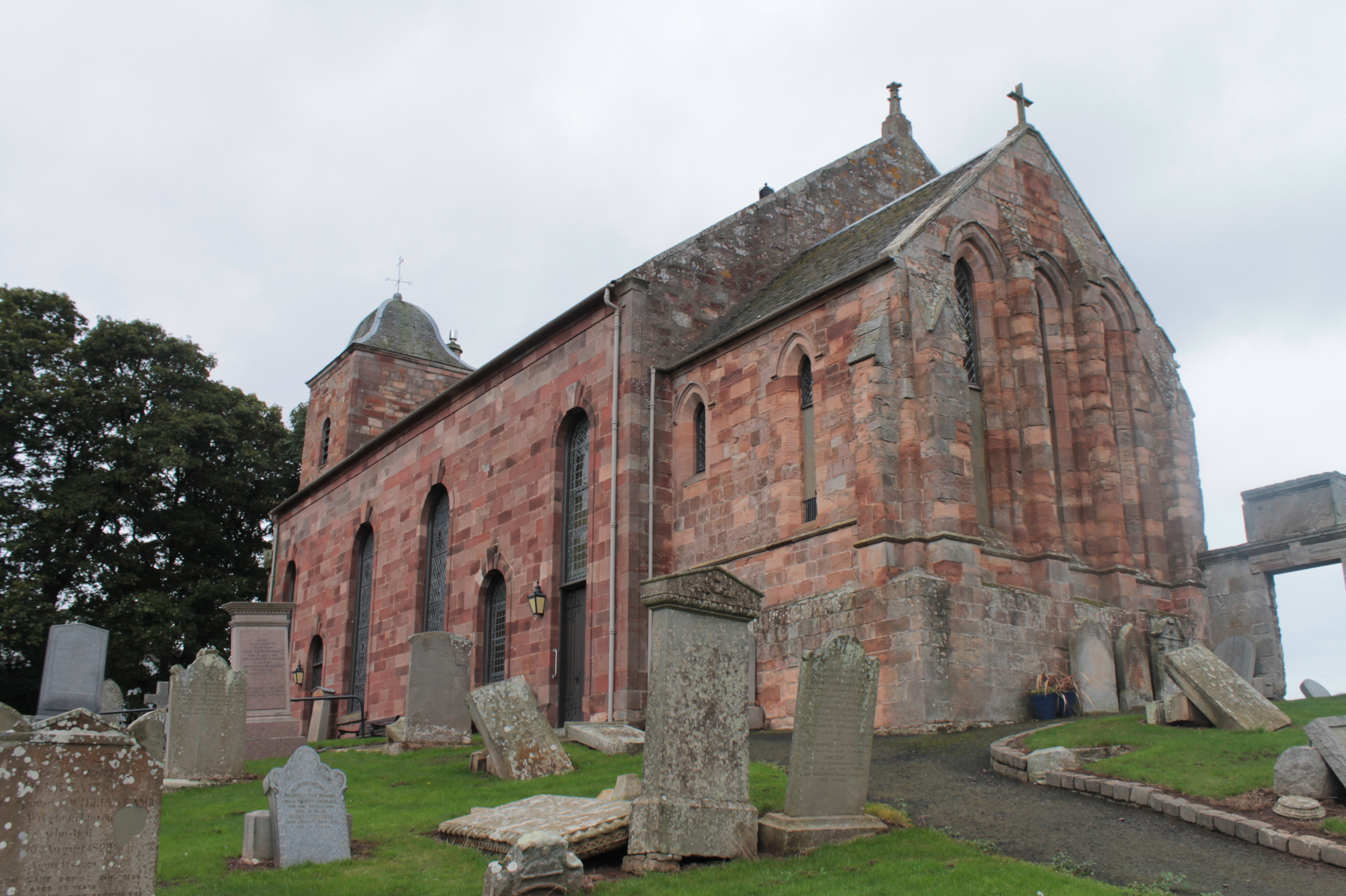
Prestonkirk, East Linton, East Lothian

East Linton is a village and former police burgh in East Lothian, Scotland, situated on the River Tyne and A199 road (former A1 road) five miles east of Haddington, with an estimated population of 1,790 in 2020. During the 19th century the population increased from 715 inhabitants in 1831 to 1,042 by 1881. The 1961 census showed the village had a population of 1,579. The number dropped significantly at the end of the 20th century, but has subsequently risen again.

== Prehistory and archaeology ==
Archaeological excavations in advance of a residential development by CFA Archaeology uncovered a Bronze Age barrow cemetery consisting of three ring-ditches. Cremation burials were recovered from all the ring-ditches, radiocarbon dated to between 1400-1000 BC. A large pit close to one of the ring-ditches, was likely used to dispose of the residue ash from funeral pyres, was also excavated. They also found a ditch dated to the medieval period.

== History ==
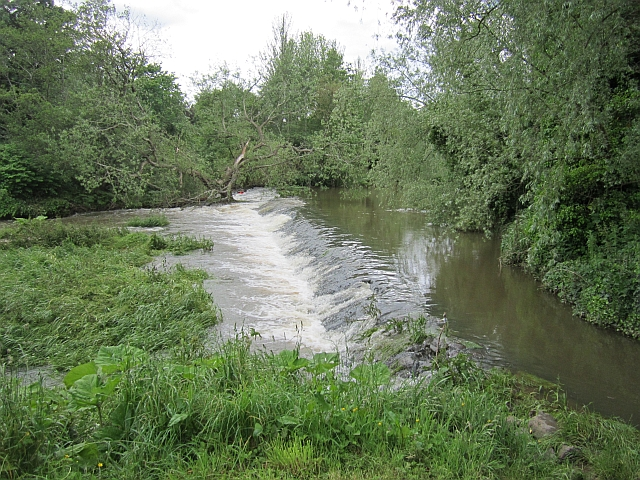
Preston Weir. The parish was formerly known as Preston-haugh or Preston-kirk.

Originally called "Linton", the village probably gets its name from the Linn (a waterfall) on the river which it grew alongside. It was later renamed "East Linton" to distinguish it from West Linton in Peeblesshire when the railways were built.

Significant to the development of the village was the East Linton Bridge crossing the River Tyne, carrying the Edinburgh to Berwick-upon-Tweed post road (Great North Road).

In September 1549 French troops destroyed the bridge to delay the retreat of the English army. The current bridge was built no later than 1560 at the same location.

Today, only one church remains active, Prestonkirk Parish Church which is also an old name of the parish. The village is now, along with Stenton and Whittingehame; part of the parish of Traprain. The original church was founded by Baldred of Tyninghame, also known as 'St Baldred of the Bass', in the sixth century. The current church tower dates from 1631, while the main building is from 1770. It was enlarged in 1824 and the interior was redesigned in 1892. The St Baldred window was established in 1959. There is also a Free Church of Scotland (St Andrew's) built in 1843, which had its own school, a Roman Catholic church (St Kentigern ) and a Methodist hall. Presbyterian Dissenters also used to worship in East Linton. The clock on St Andrew's former church was put in by the village to commemorate Queen Victoria's Golden Jubilee; it was named "Jessie" after a local girl when some village lads climbed into the steeple and poured a libation over the clock to christen it. The name has remained ever since. There has long been a school in the village, and the mid-Victorian schoolmaster in East Linton was a George Pringle Smith (d.1850).

The fountain, which stands in The Square on the site of an old well, takes the form of a large cast iron basin with scalloped edges which stands on an ashlar pedestal and, in turn, supports a three-armed lamp standard. At the base of this there are four young child figures beneath a scalloped canopy, each holding a vase out of which water flows. A plaque attached to the N side of the pedestal records that the fountain was 'Presented to the Burgh of East Linton by John Drysdale Esq., Buenos Ayres. -1882-' Around the bottom edge of the plaque is the legend 'John Storie Esq., Chief Magistrate.' John Drysdale, was a former East Linton native who settled in Buenos Aires, to become a farmer/rancher/businessman.

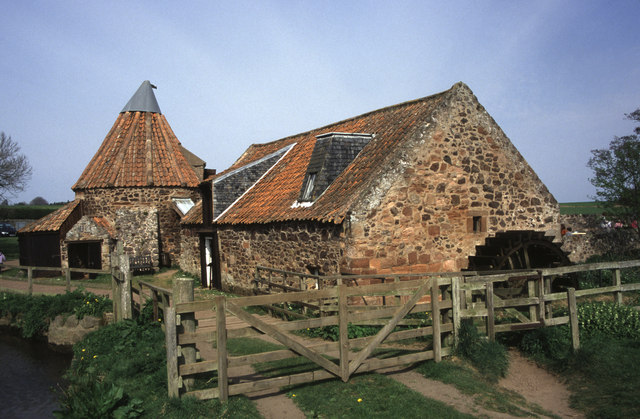
Preston Mill

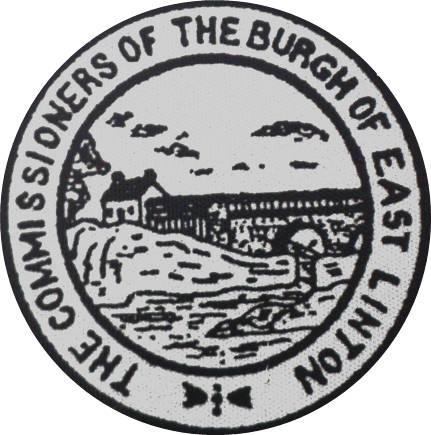
Seal of the Burgh of East Linton

Preston Mill, an old watermill, is on the outskirts. There has been a mill on the site since 1599, and it is still working. Attached to the watermill is a kiln, with a cowl of local design. The property is now in the care of the National Trust for Scotland. The mill was the location setting for a number of scenes during the Jacobite Uprising in Season 1 of the 'Outlander' TV series.

Prestonkirk House dominates the entrance to Stories Park. Built in 1865 as the county's Combination Poorhouse, it served 15 parishes and housed 88 people. It now serves as housing and for the library and Day Centre. Stories Park takes its name from the Storie family of veterinary surgeons, who lived in The Square and kept racehorses in their 'park'. Francis Storie (d.1875) was East Linton's chief magistrate 1866–72.

The Peerie Well, beside the River Tyne, supplied the village with water from 1881.

Prior to the coming of the North British Railway, the mail coaches changed horses at the Douglas Inn, opposite the distillery in East Linton. A fine Victorian station on the East Coast Main Line opened in 1846. Following the closure of the branch railway line to Haddington in 1949, East Linton became the next closest for that burgh until it too closed in 1964 as part of Dr Richard Beeching's Reshaping of British Railways. The original station building is now used as a residence.

A surviving relic of East Linton's past importance as an agricultural centre is a timber octagonal auction mart for cattle, pigs and sheep in Station Road. Dating back to 1850, the mart has recently been fully restored and is now used for various community functions and a Sunday market. The location was used as the setting to re-introduce Stephen Bonnet in a darkly memorable fashion during Season 5 of the 'Outlander' TV series.

== Notable people ==
- Robert Brown (1757-1831) agriculturalist was born here.
- Gavin Douglas (c.1474 - September 1522)
- William Dudgeon c.1753-1813) poet was born at Tyninghame and is buried at Prestonkirk.
- Charles Martin Hardie (1858-1916) artist born here
- Andrew Meikle (1719-1811) mechanical engineer, credited with inventing the mechanical threshing machine died here.
- Robert Noble (1857-1917) artist and founder and president of the Scottish Society of Arts lived his later years here and died here.
- John Pettie (1839-1893) painter lived here.
- George Rennie (1802-1860) sculptor and politician was born here, at Phantassie.
- George Rennie (1749-1828) agriculturalist, was born here at Phantassie.
- John Rennie (1761-1821) civil engineer was born here, at Phantassie.
- Gilbert Rule (1629-1701) prisoner on the Bass Rock and Principal of Edinburgh University
- John Shirreff (1759-1818) agricultural writer is buried at Prestonkirk.

== Climate ==
Like most of Scotland, East Linton has a temperate, maritime climate which is relatively mild despite its northerly latitude. Winter daytime temperatures rarely fall below 2 °C (36 °F). and is milder than places such as Moscow and Labrador which lie at similar latitudes. Summer temperatures are normally moderate, rarely exceeding 20 °C (68 °F). The prevailing wind direction is from the south west, which is often associated with warm, unstable air from the North Atlantic Current that can give rise to rainfall – although considerably less than locations in the west of Scotland. Rainfall is distributed fairly evenly throughout the year. Winds from an easterly direction are usually drier but considerably colder, and may be accompanied by haar, a persistent coastal fog.

Climate data for Dunbar 20m asl, 1981-2010 - (Weather station 5 miles (8 km) to the east of East Linton)
Month	Jan	Feb	Mar	Apr	May	Jun	Jul	Aug	Sep	Oct	Nov	Dec	Year
Mean daily maximum °C (°F)	7.1 (44.8)	7.4 (45.3)	9.2 (48.6)	11.0 (51.8)	13.7 (56.7)	16.7 (62.1)	18.8 (65.8)	18.8 (65.8)	16.5 (61.7)	13.2 (55.8)	9.7 (49.5)	7.3 (45.1)	12.5 (54.5)
Mean daily minimum °C (°F)	1.9 (35.4)	2.0 (35.6)	3.1 (37.6)	4.5 (40.1)	6.7 (44.1)	9.6 (49.3)	11.4 (52.5)	11.5 (52.7)	9.9 (49.8)	7.3 (45.1)	4.3 (39.7)	2.1 (35.8)	6.2 (43.2)
Average precipitation mm (inches)	49.0 (1.93)	34.4 (1.35)	42.5 (1.67)	36.1 (1.42)	44.7 (1.76)	56.9 (2.24)	55.9 (2.20)	55.0 (2.17)	57.4 (2.26)	62.5 (2.46)	54.5 (2.15)	54.6 (2.15)	603.5 (23.76)
Average rainy days	10.5	8.0	9.0	8.0	9.2	9.9	9.4	9.6	9.0	11.0	10.4	11.0	115.0
Mean monthly sunshine hours	58.0	77.6	114.9	146.6	192.4	171.3	179.2	163.2	128.7	100.0	71.3	48.1	1,451.3
Source: Met Office

== Public transport ==
The village is served by East Linton railway station on the East Coast Main Line, which reopened in December 2023 following a £15m investment. The new station has step-free access across the railway via a footbridge with lifts and there is parking for 114 vehicles, including 18 electric vehicle charging points. It is on a different site to the earlier station, which closed in 1964.

There are also regular bus services linking the village with Edinburgh via Haddington, north to North Berwick and east to Dunbar, continuing south to Berwick-upon-Tweed.

== Sport ==
East Linton has a local football team named East Linton AFC.

East Linton Curling Club was formed in 1837.

East Linton Bowling Club is situated in Bank Road.

== See also ==
List of listed buildings in East Linton, East Lothian
