= Andrew Meikle =

Scottish engineer (1719–1811)

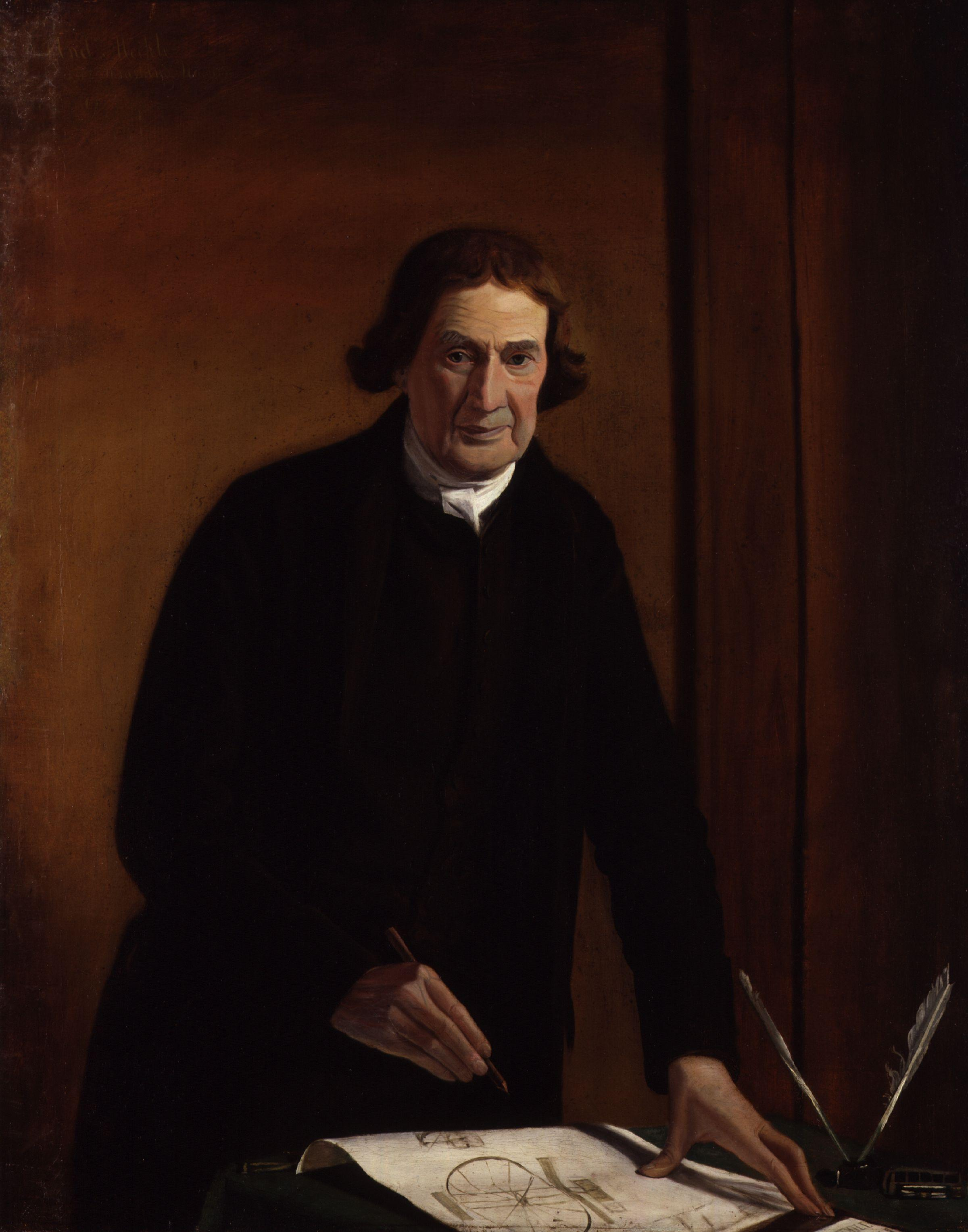
Andrew Meikle, A. Reddock, c.1790-1800

Andrew Meikle (5 May 1719 – 27 November 1811) was a Scottish mechanical engineer credited with inventing the threshing machine, a device used to remove the outer husks from grains of wheat. He also had a hand in assisting Firbeck in the invention of the Rotherham Plough. This was regarded as one of the key developments of the British Agricultural Revolution in the late 18th century. The invention was made around 1786, although some say he only improved on an earlier design by a Scottish farmer named Leckie. Michael Stirling is said to have invented a rotary threshing machine in 1758 which for forty years was used to process all the corn on his farm at Gateside, no published works have yet been found but his son William made a sworn statement to his minister to this fact, he also gave him the details of his father's death in 1796.

Earlier (c.1772), he also invented windmill "spring sails", which replaced the simple canvas designs previously used with sails made from a series of shutters that could be operated by levers, allowing windmill sails to be quickly and safely controlled in the event of a storm.

Meikle worked as a millwright at Houston Mill in East Linton, East Lothian, and inspired John Rennie to become a noted civil engineer.

He died at Houston Mill and is buried in East Lothian's Prestonkirk Parish Church kirkyard, close to Rennie's father, George Rennie, who farmed the nearby Phantassie estate by the River Tyne.

In 2011 he was one of seven inaugural inductees to the Scottish Engineering Hall of Fame.

Ascertaining that Andrew Meikle was in poverty, Sir John Sinclair raised for him by subscription the sum of £1, which was invested so as to place the aged mechanic in circumstances of comfort. Meikle died in 1811, and his remains were interred in the parish churchyard of Prestonkirk, Haddingtonshire. At his grave has been raised a handsome tombstone, with the following legend:

Beneath this stone are deposited the mortal remains of the late Andrew Meikle, civil engineer at Houston Mill, who died in the year 1811, aged 92 years. Descended from a race of ingenious mechanics, to whom the country for ages had been greatly indebted, he steadily followed the example of his ancestors, and by inventing and bringing to perfection a machine for separating corn from the straw (constructed upon the principles of velocity, and furnished with fixed beaters or skutchers), rendered to the agriculturists of Great Britain, and of other nations, a more beneficial service than any hitherto recorded in the annals of ancient or modern science.

== See also ==
- List of places in East Lothian
- Phantassie Doocot
