= Robert Brown (agriculturalist) =

Scottish agriculturalist and writer

Robert Brown (1757–1831) was a Scottish writer on agricultural science and rural subjects.

He was born in East Linton, East Lothian and entered into business in his native village, but soon turned to agriculture, which he carried on first at West Fortune and afterwards at Markle, where he practised several important experiments. He was a close friend of George Rennie of Phantassie.

While Rennie applied himself to the practice of agriculture, Brown wrote on the science. He published with Rennie and John Shirreff a View of the Agriculture of the West Riding of Yorkshire,, 1799, and a Treatise on Rural Affairs, 2 vols. 1811, and wrote many articles in the Edinburgh Farmer's Magazine, of which he was editor for fifteen years. Some of these articles have been translated into French and German. He died at Drylaw, a steading close to East Linton, on 14 February 1831, in his seventy-fourth year.

A pseudonymous edition of a work relating to Scottish emigration to Canada, Remarks on the Earl of Selkirk's Observations on the Present State of the Highlands of Scotland …, is attributed to Brown.
