= William Dudgeon (poet) =

Scottish poet

William Dudgeon (1753?–1813), was a Scottish poet.

Dudgeon, son of John Dudgeon, farmer, was born about 1753 at Tyninghame, East Lothian. His mother was an aunt of Robert Ainslie, writer to the signet, a friend of Robert Burns. Dudgeon was educated with Rennie the engineer at Dunbar. His father procured for him a thirty years' lease of an extensive tract of land near Dunse in Berwickshire. This farm, much of which was in the condition of a wilderness, he cultivated for many years with much success. He gave it the name of Primrose Hill, and there he wrote several songs, one of which, 'The Maid that tends the Goats,’ was printed and became very popular. It may be read in Allan Cunningham's edition of Burns's 'Works,’ p. 533. His other pieces remain in manuscript.

He also occupied his leisure with painting and music. In May 1787 he was introduced to Burns, then on a visit to Mr. Ainslie of Berrywell, near Dunse, father of Robert Ainslie. Burns made the following entry in his journal: 'Mr. Dudgeon, a poet at times, a worthy remarkable character, natural penetration, a great deal of information, some genius, and extraordinary modesty'. Dudgeon died on 28 October 1813, and was buried in the churchyard of Prestonkirk.
