= Phantassie =

Coordinates: 55.989°N 2.651°W

Phantassie: Scottish Gaelic: Fàn Taise
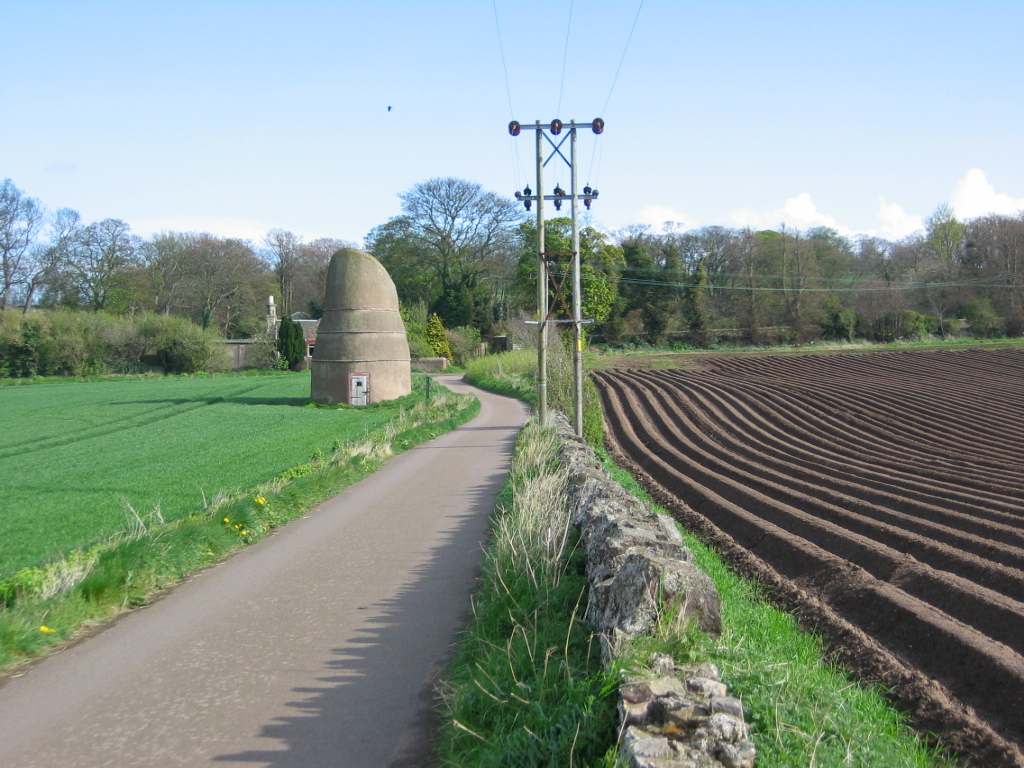
- Phantassie village and Doocot

- Location within Scotland
- OS grid reference: NT594774
- Civil parish: Prestonkirk
- Council area: East Lothian Council
- Lieutenancy area: East Lothian
- Country: Scotland
- Sovereign state: United Kingdom
- Post town: EAST LINTON
- Postcode district: EH40
- Dialling code: 01620
- Police: Scotland
- Fire: Scottish
- Ambulance: Scottish
- UK Parliament: East Lothian
- Scottish Parliament: East Lothian

Phantassie (Scottish Gaelic: Fàn taise) (in English "damp gentle slope") is an agricultural hamlet near East Linton, East Lothian, Scotland. It is close to the River Tyne, Preston Mill, and Prestonkirk Parish Church.

The 704-acre (285 ha) Phantassie Farm and Workshop, presently owned by Hamilton Farmers, is the birthplace and childhood home of the civil engineer John Rennie the Elder (1761–1821), and his brother George Rennie (1749–1828). John Rennie is commemorated at Phantassie by balusters taken from Waterloo Bridge in London, which he designed. The estate was formerly the property of the Countess of Aberdeen, until purchased by the Rennie family in the 18th century. The 18th century main house is a category A listed building, while the farmstead is category B listed.

== Phantassie Doocot ==
Phantassie Doocot is a "beehive" doocot, or dovecote, and is a National Trust for Scotland property, along with the nearby Preston Mill. It was built in the 16th century, and has an unusual parapet in the shape of a horseshoe. Behind the 4 feet (1.2 m) thick walls, there are 544 nestboxes which, in years gone by, would have given good shelter to the birds. The building was given to the National Trust for Scotland in 1961 by William Hamilton of Phantassie Farm, and is a category A listed building.

Phantassie walled garden has been used for over 150 years and is dedicated to the rearing of Gloucester and Berkshire pigs, as well as Black Rock hens and organic produce.

== Photo gallery ==
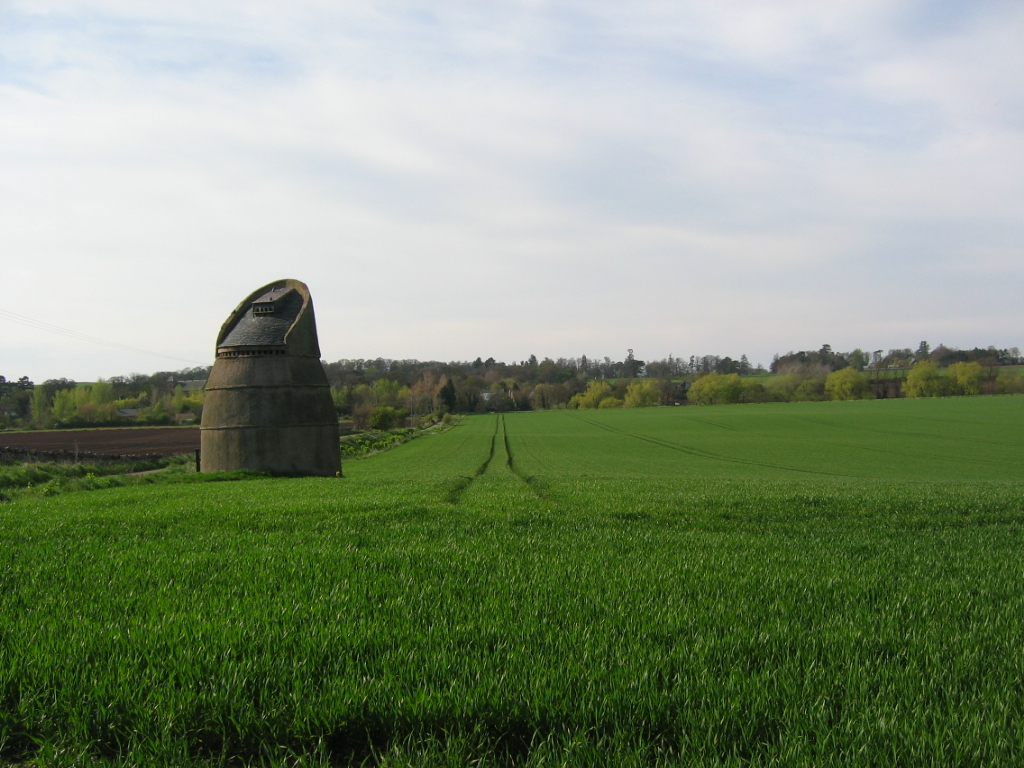
The doocot and field

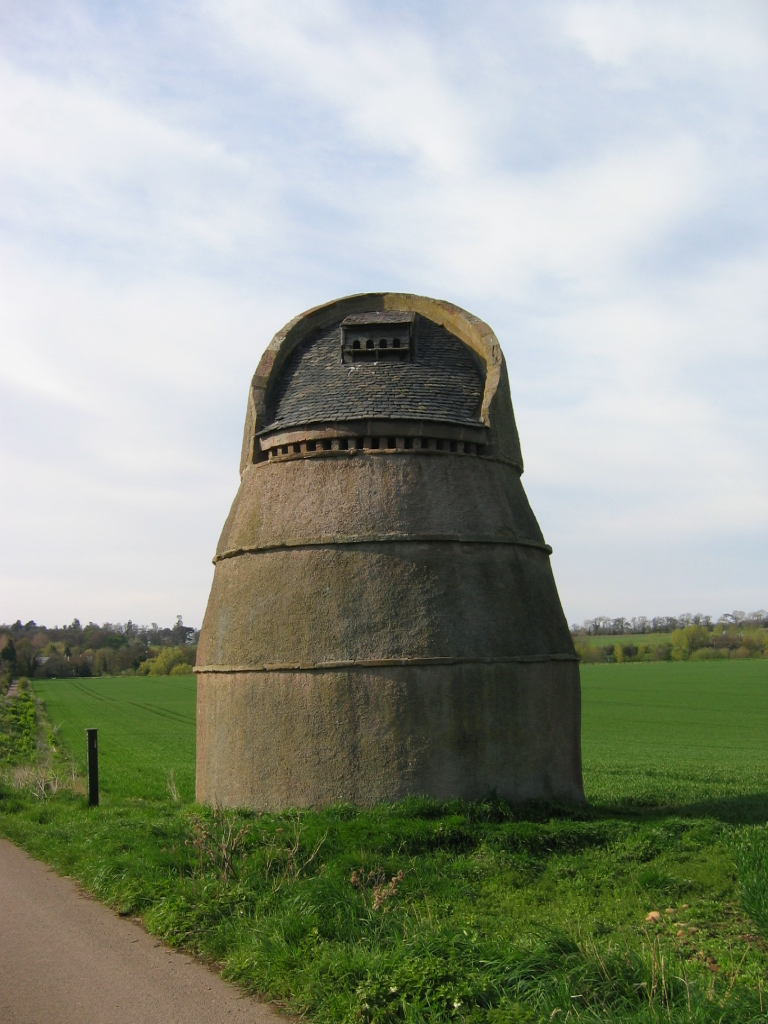
The beehive doocot at Phantassie

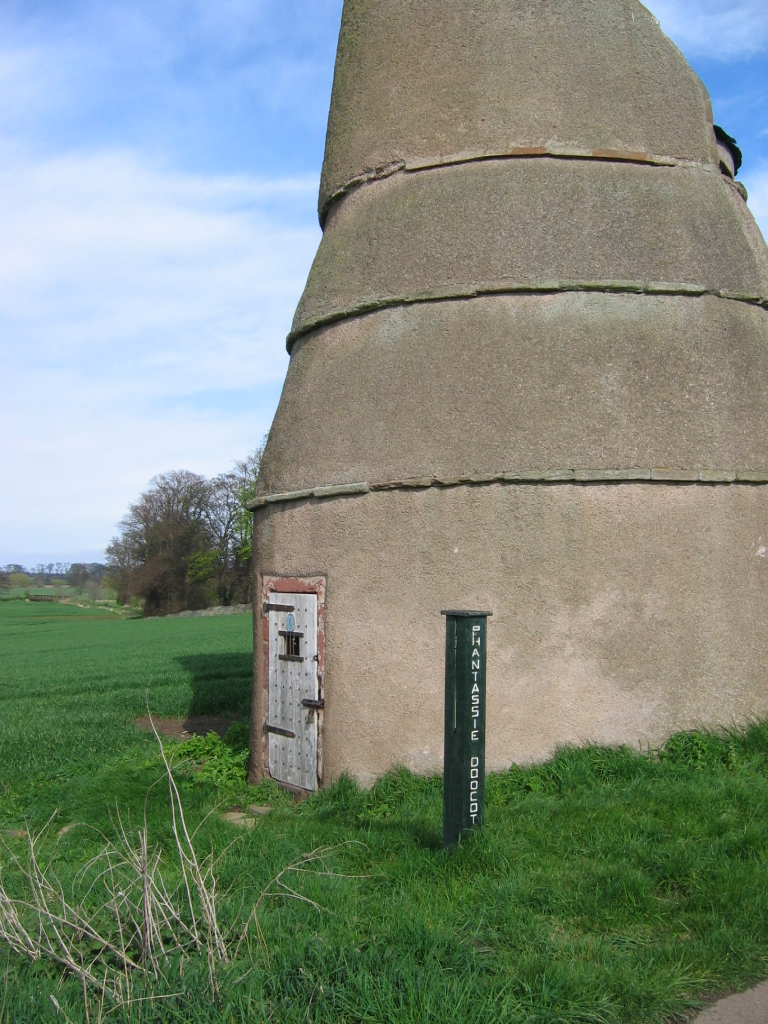
The doocot

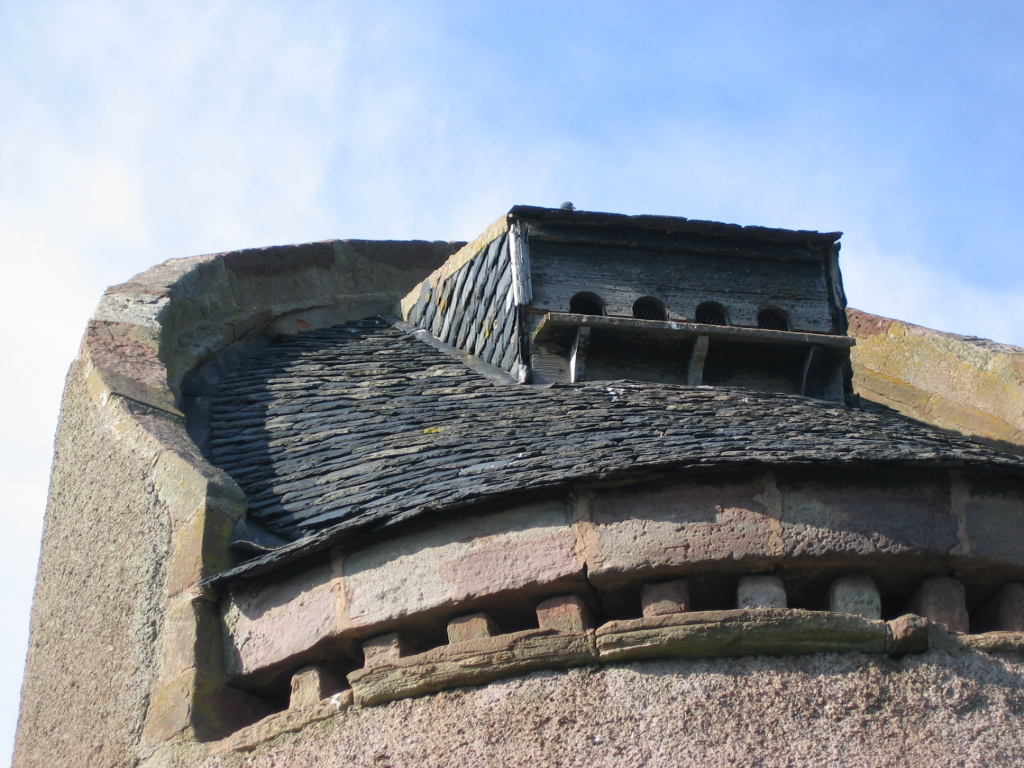
Horseshoe-shaped parapet of the doocot
