= River Tyne, Scotland =

River in Scotland

Coordinates: 56.00486°N 2.60178°W

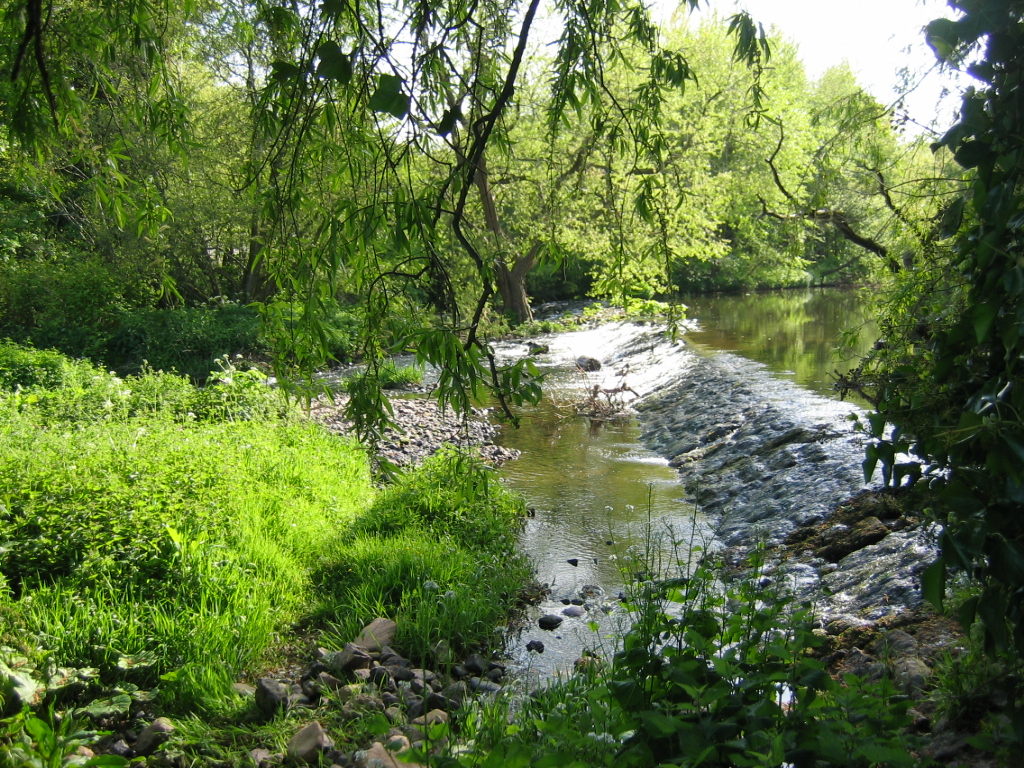

The River Tyne is a river in Scotland. It rises in the Moorfoot Hills in Midlothian near Tynehead to the south of Edinburgh, at the junction of the B6458 and the B6367. It continues approximately 30 miles (50 kilometres) northeast, and empties into the North Sea near Belhaven.

== Origins ==
The Tyne is mainly a confluence between the Birns Water and the Tyne Water, about 2 kilometres (1.2 mi) east of Easter Pencaitland and 1-kilometre (0.62 mi) south west of Spilmersford Bridge, in the grounds of Saltoun Hall. The Humbie Water is another main headwater.

The Tyne has a number of tributaries:

- Bellyford Burn, rises east of Dalkeith; passes north of Cousland, Midlothian and south of Carberry Hill; south of Elphinstone Tower; north of Ormiston; joins Puddle Burn; joins Tyne Water at Winton House.
- Kinchie Burn, rises east of Pathhead; supplies Glenkinchie Distillery; joins Birns Water at Milton Bridge, West Saltoun.
- Blackford Burn/Belsis Burn/Murray's Burn, joins the Tyne Water at Pencaitland.
- Cock Burn, rises at Lower Saltoun, joins the Tyne at Badger Wood.
- Fala Dam Burn, East Water, Salters' Burn and Blackhouse Burn combine into Keith Water which flows into Humbie Water, south of Humbie Kirk.
- Johnstounburn Water rises near Woodcote Mill and joins Humbie Water near Saltoun Forest.
- Letham Burn and St Laurence House Burn combine to join the Tyne at the southern outskirts of Haddington.
- Bearford Burn rises in Playmuir wood and joins the Tyne at Beanston Mill.
- Old Hailes Burn joins the Tyne at Hailes Castle.

Gallery starts with the Tyne's main headwaters: Birns Water, Tyne Water, Humbie Water

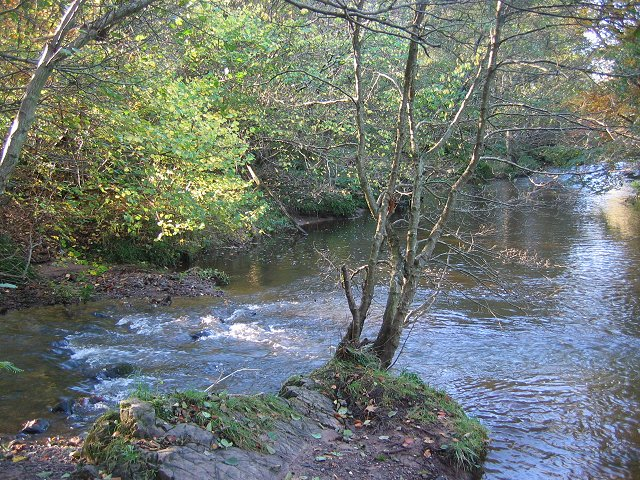
Confluence Birns Water / Humbie Water

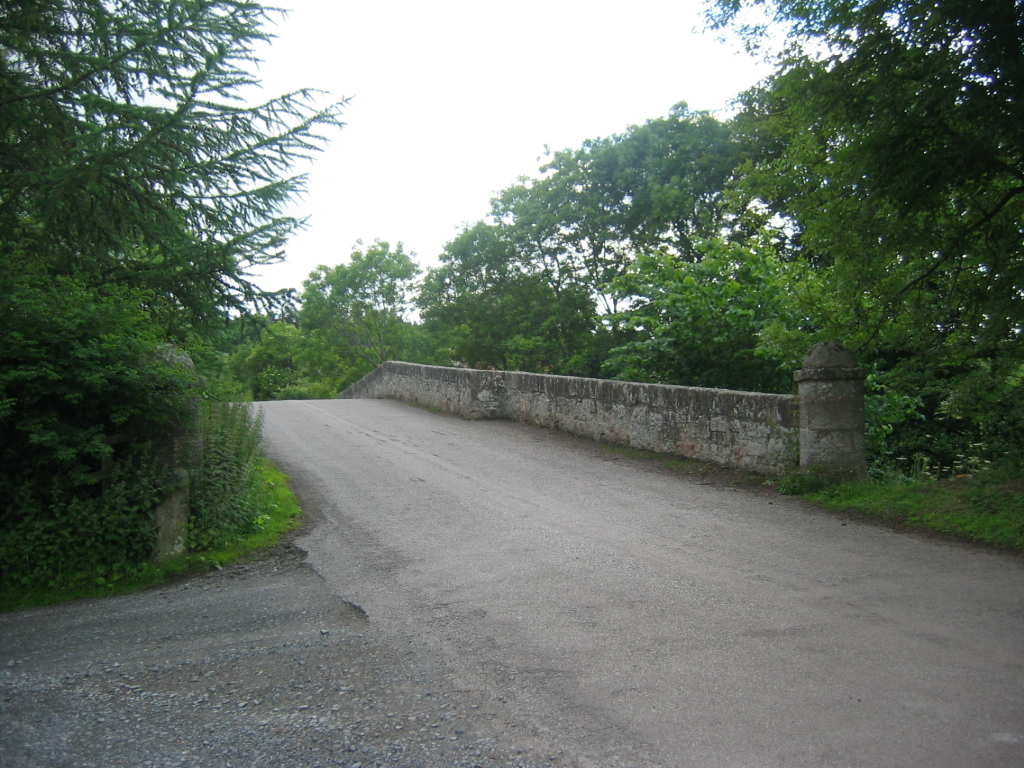
Milton Bridge, Birns Water

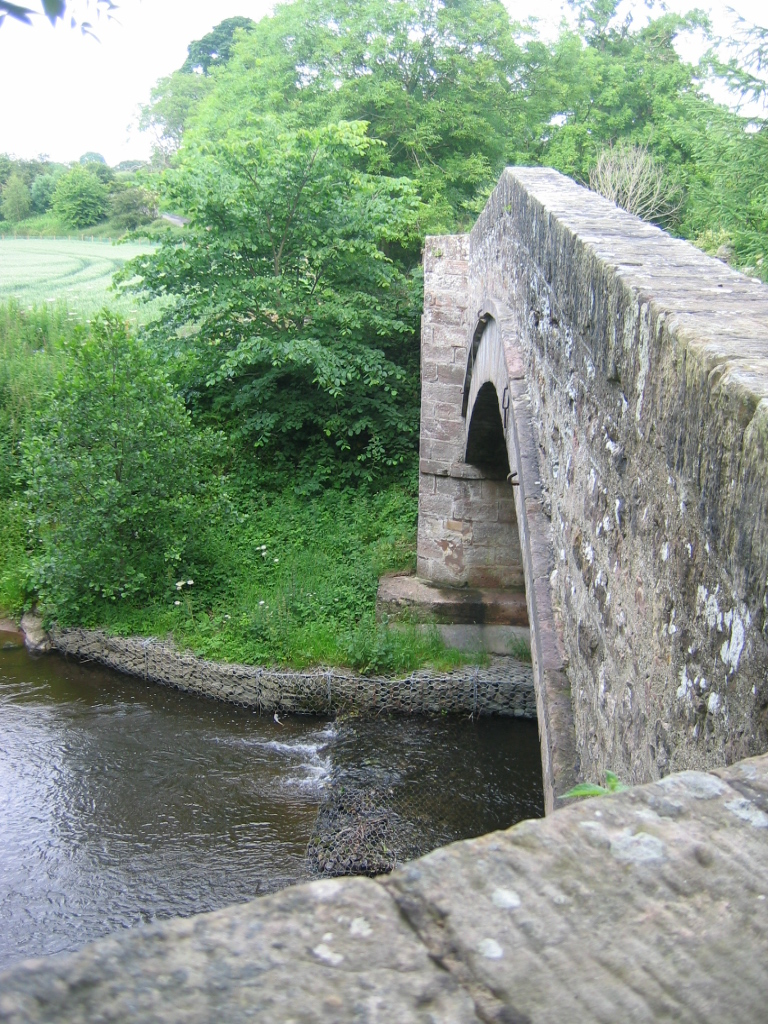
Birns Water, Milton Bridge arch

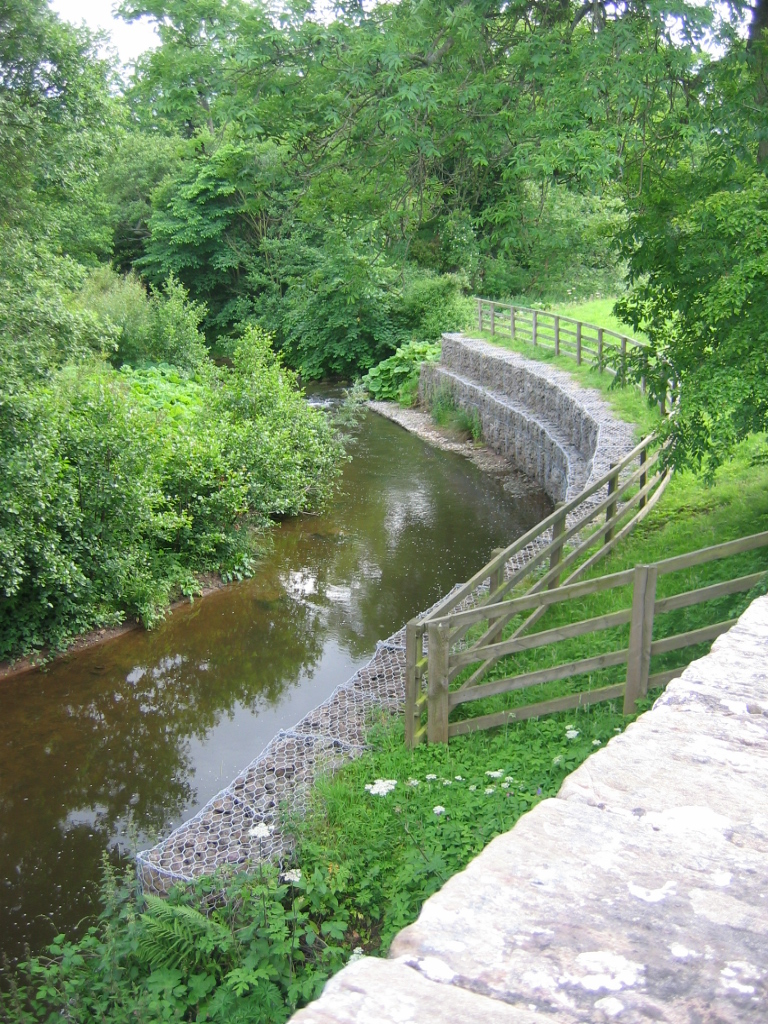
Bank Improvements at Milton Bridge

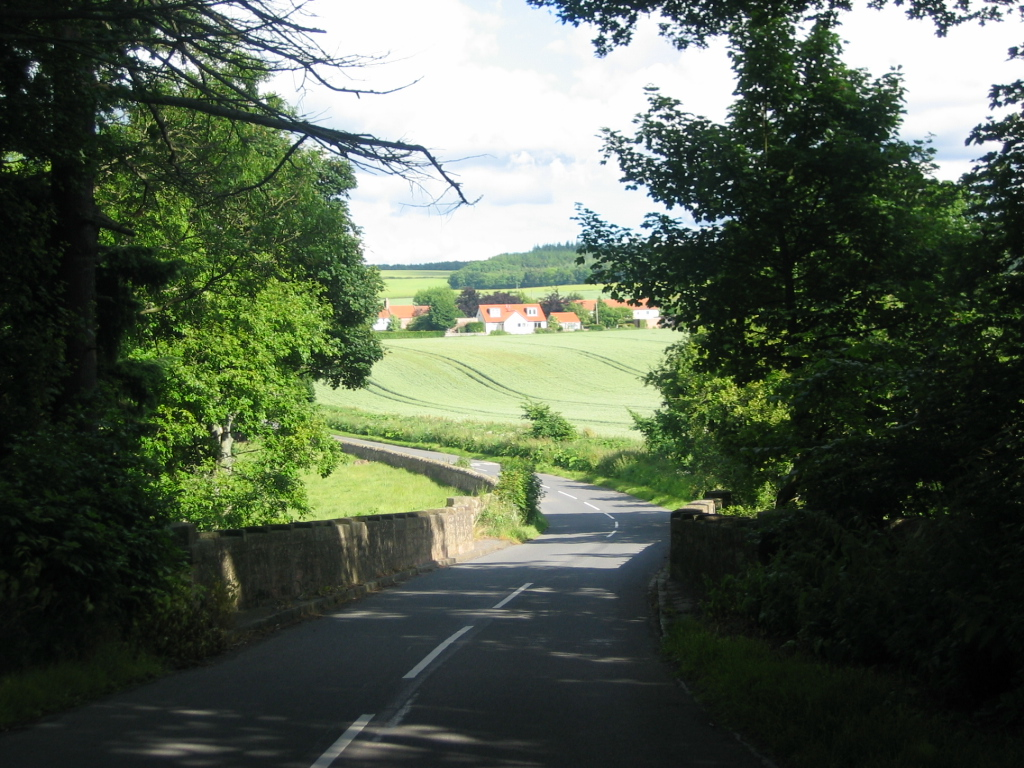
Birns Water, Saltoun Bridge

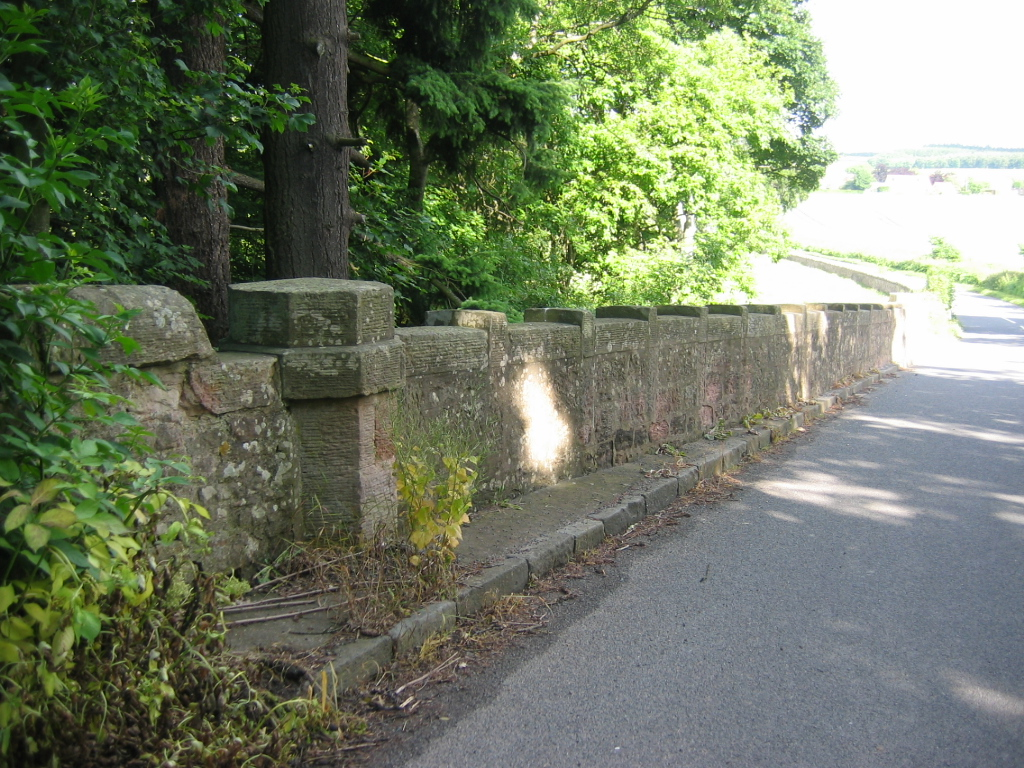
Birns Water, Saltoun Bridge

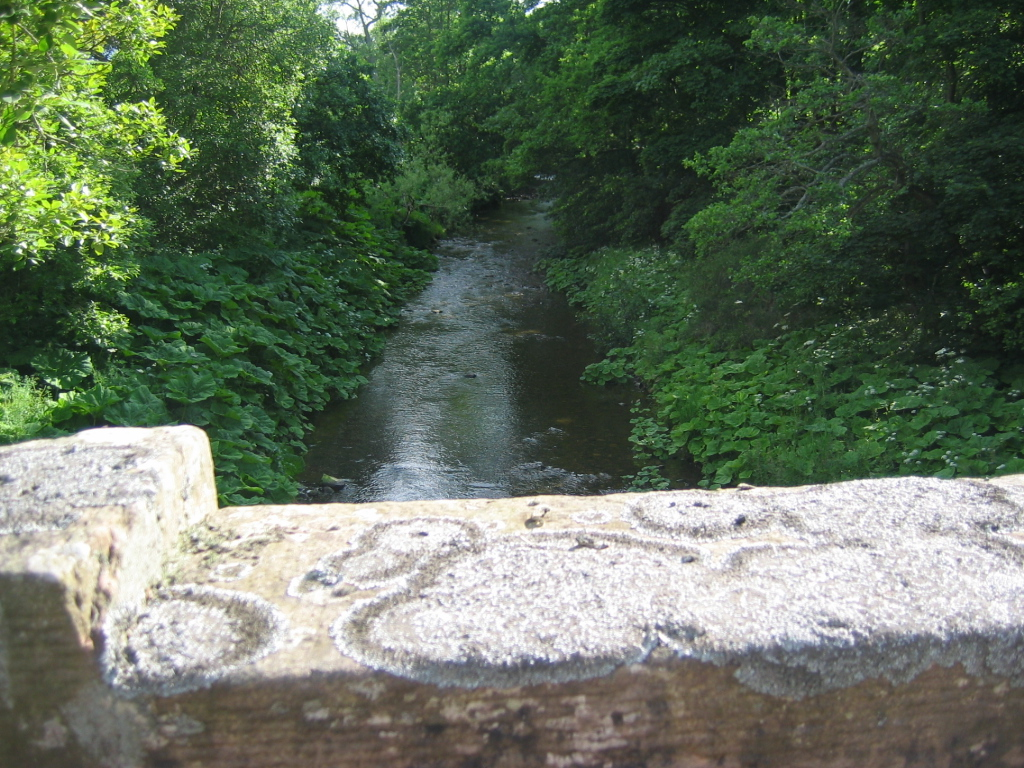
Birns Water, lichen on Saltoun bridge

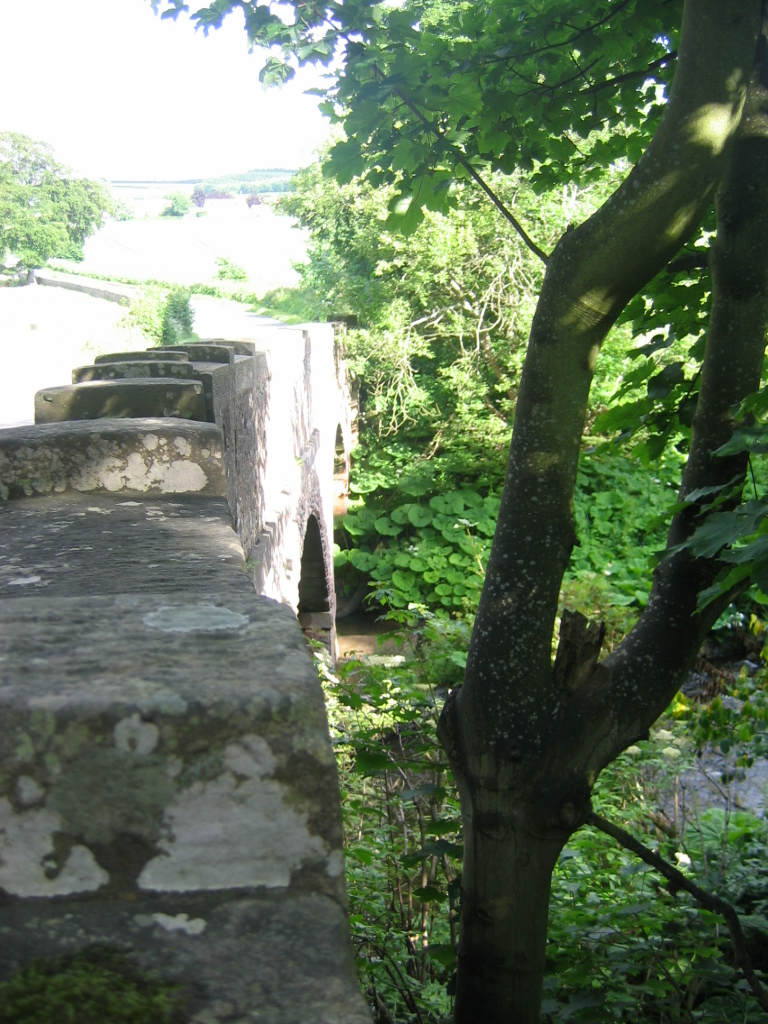
Birns Water, Saltoun Bridge arch

== Journey ==
On its way to the North Sea, the Tyne passes through, or near to, the following places:

- Easter Pencaitland; Spilmersford Bridge, B6355 road; Saltoun Hall
- Nisbet; Badger Wood; Herdmanston Mains
- Samuelston bridge; Begbie; Grants' Braes Bridge on B6368
- Clerkington and Clerkington Mill
- Haddington: Knox Academy; Stevenson Bridge; Cheviot House Mill; Sports Centre; Waterloo Bridge B6368; St. Mary's Church; Nungate Bridge; Victoria Bridge; Forms part of North boundary of Haddington golf club.
- Abbey Bridge, Abbeymill Farm (south of the A1); Lady's Wood; Stevenson House
- Sandy's Mill; Beanston Mill; Brown Knowe Plantation;
- Hailes Castle, Hailes Mill
- A1 Bridge, Brae Heads, north of Traprain Law
- East Linton; A199 bridge; B1377 bridge
- Phantassie Farm, birthplace of John Rennie (engineer); Phantassie Doocot
- alongside the B1407, past Prestonkirk Parish Church and Preston Mill
- Knowes Mill; Acre Plantation; Tyninghame Bridge, A198; Firth Plantation
- Tyninghame House north of the Tyne
- Mosshouse Point; Hedderwick Sands; Belhaven Bay, Tyne Sands, St. Baldred's Cradle, John Muir Country Park

The River Tyne's journey from Spilmersford Bridge to the Tyne Estuary

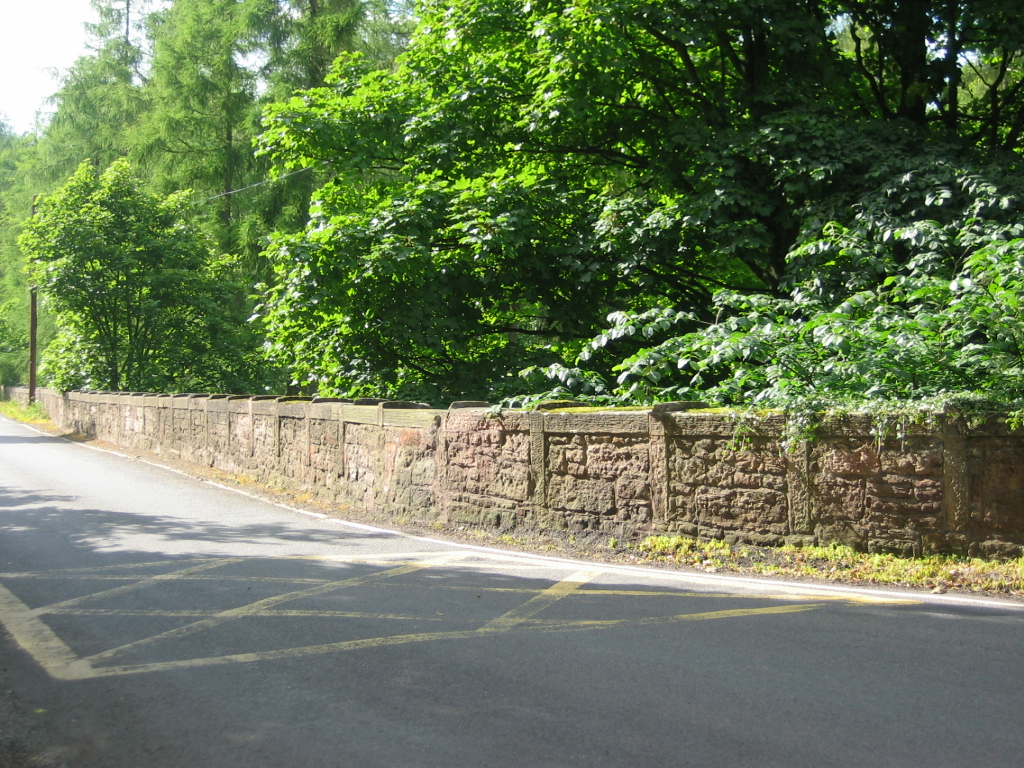
Spilmersford Bridge, Saltoun Hall

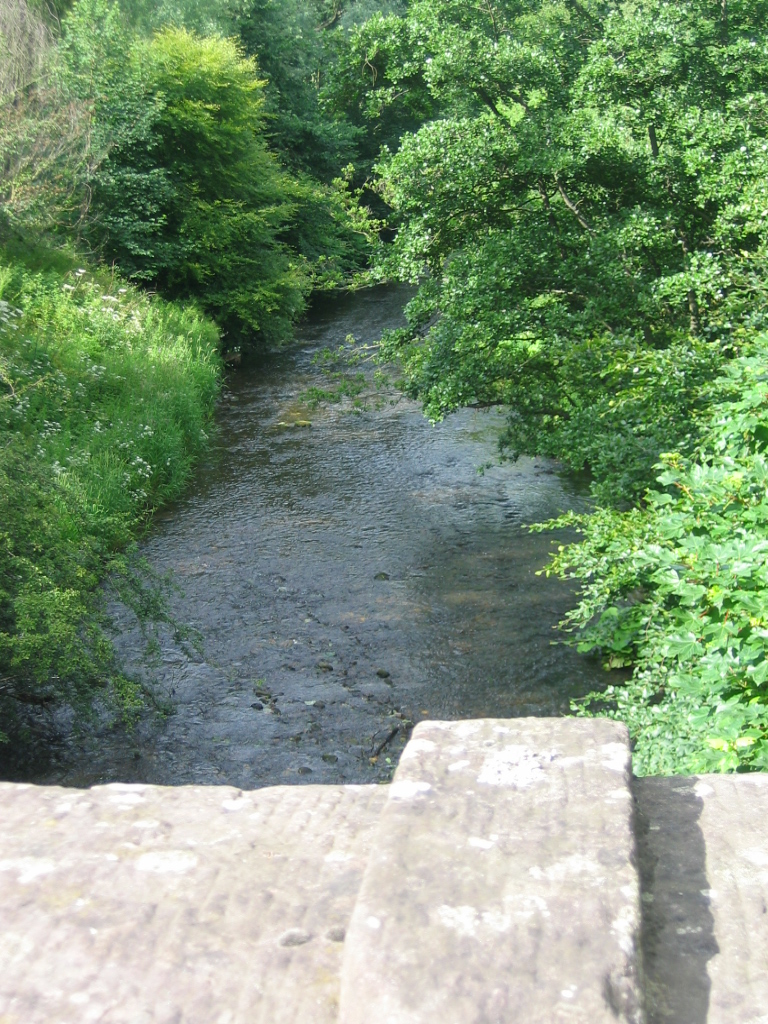
River Tyne, Spilmersford

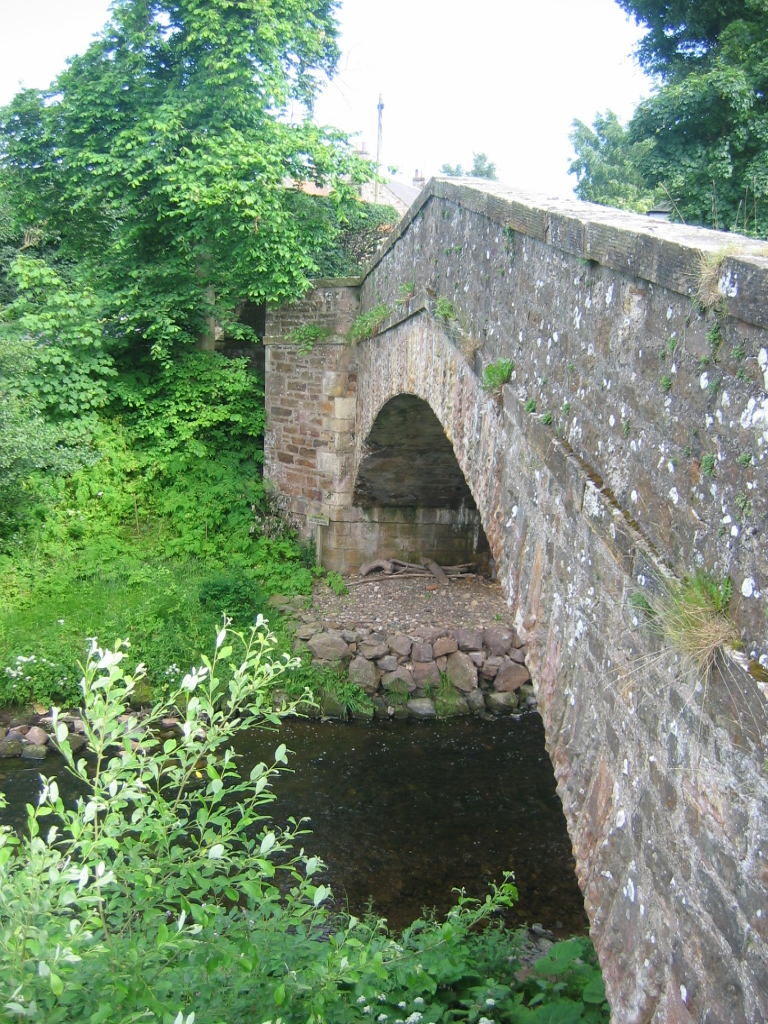
Bridge at Samuelston

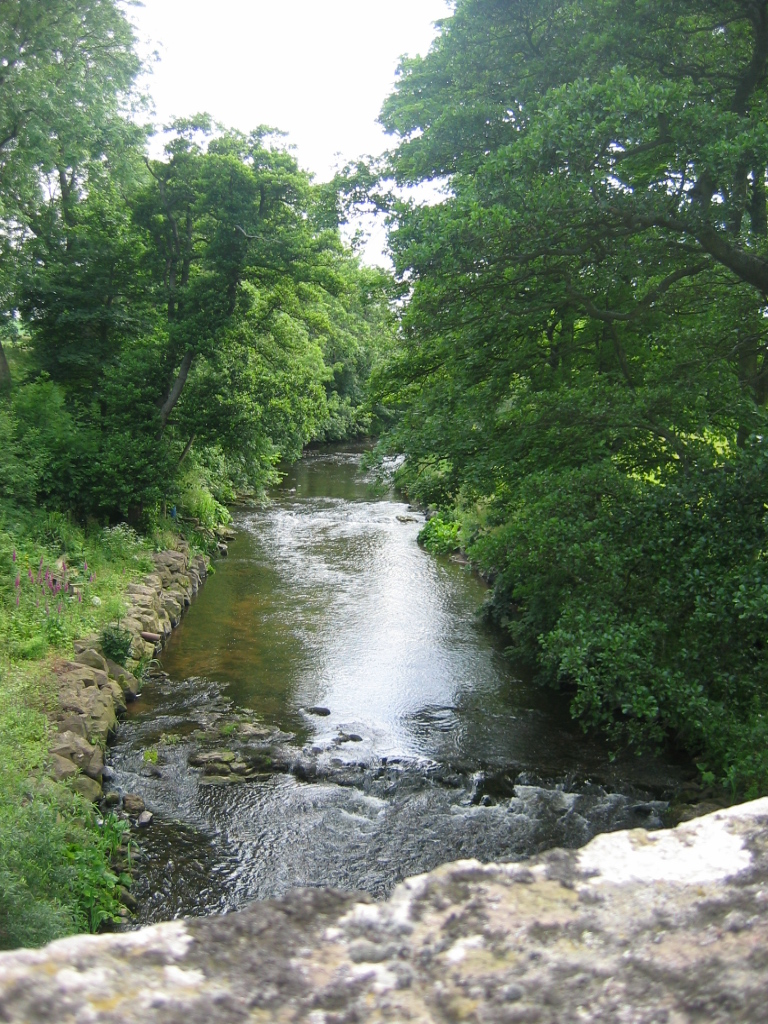
Tyne at Samuelston

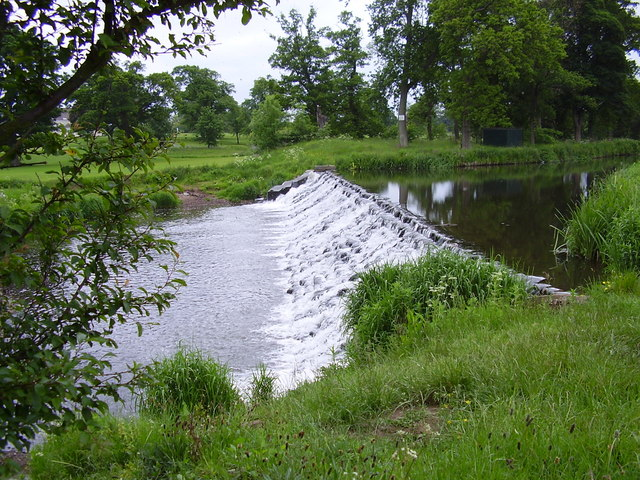
Weir at Haddington

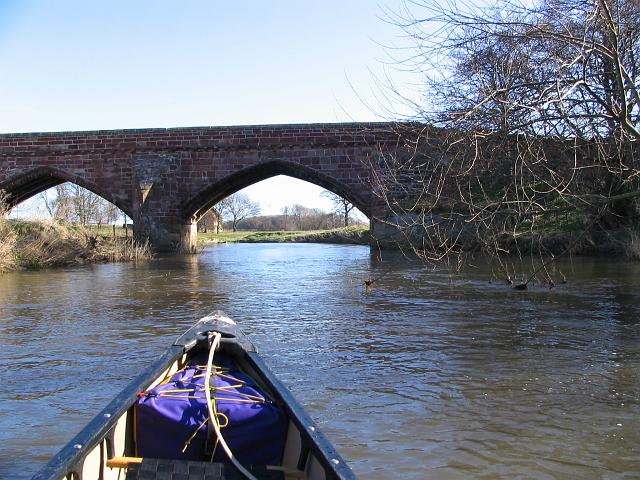
Abbey Bridge over Tyne, Abbey Mill, Haddington

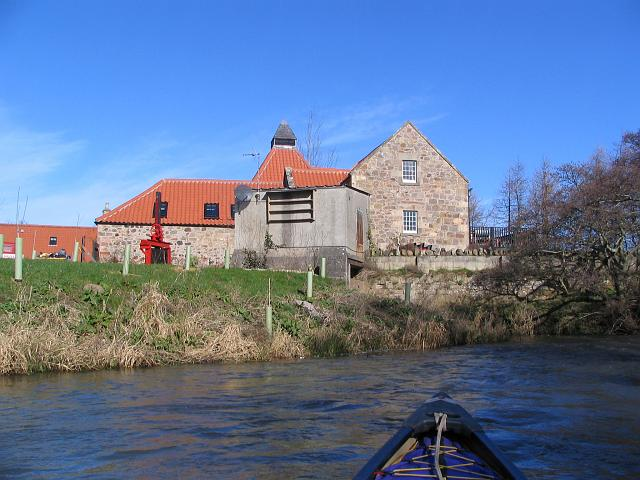
Sandy's Mill

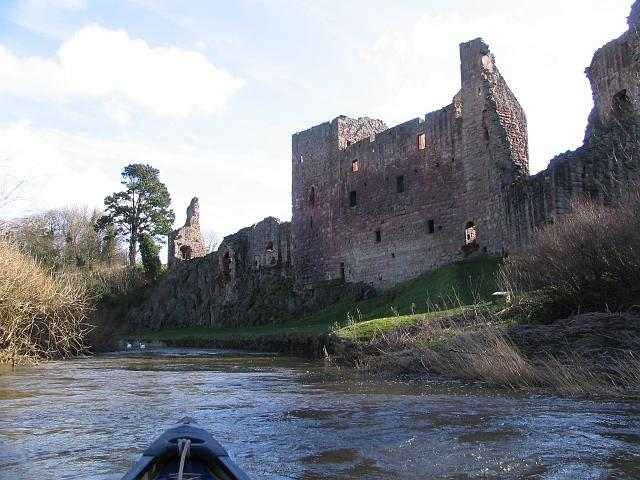
Hailes Castle

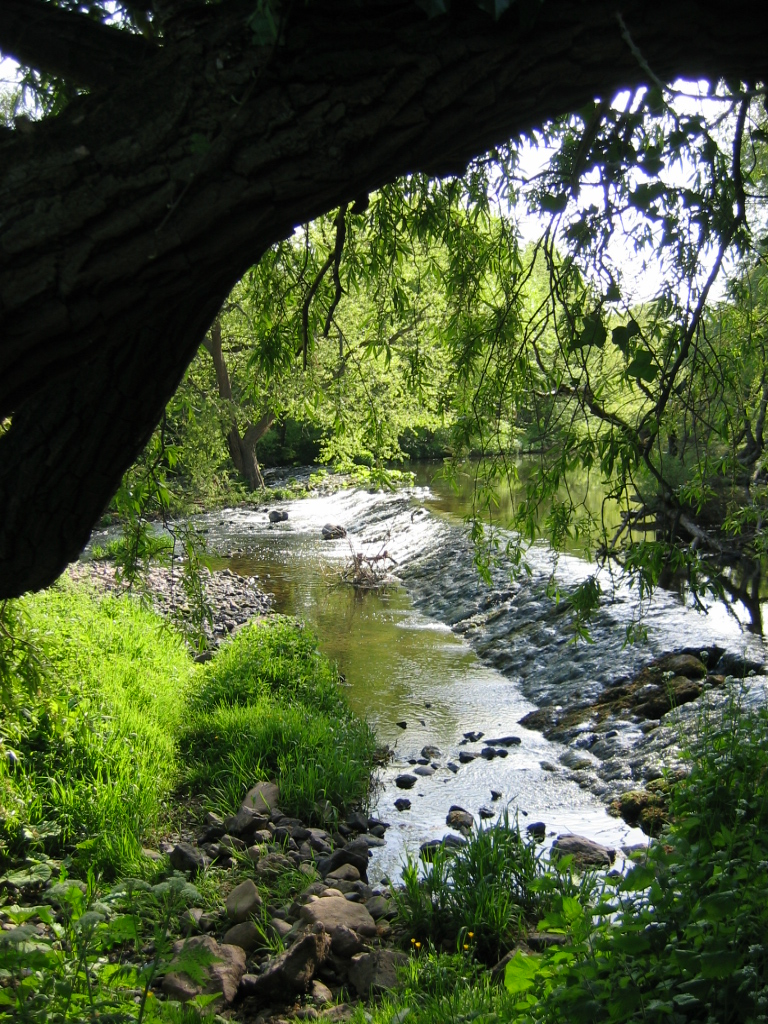
Tyne at Preston Mill

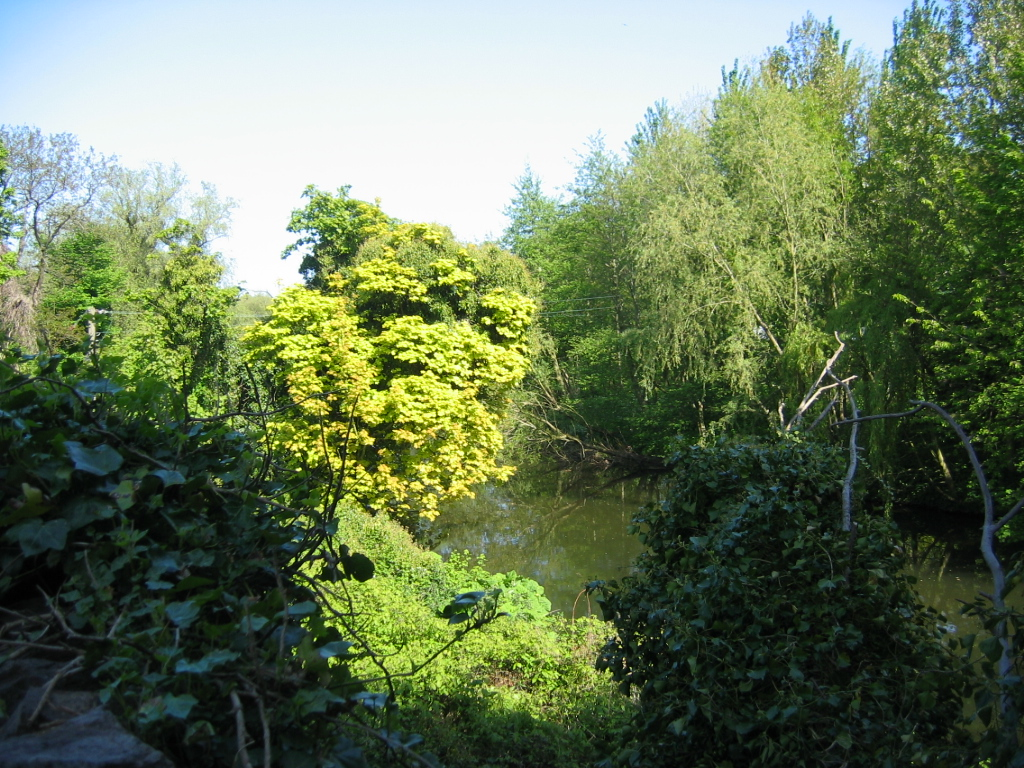
Prestonkirk, East Linton

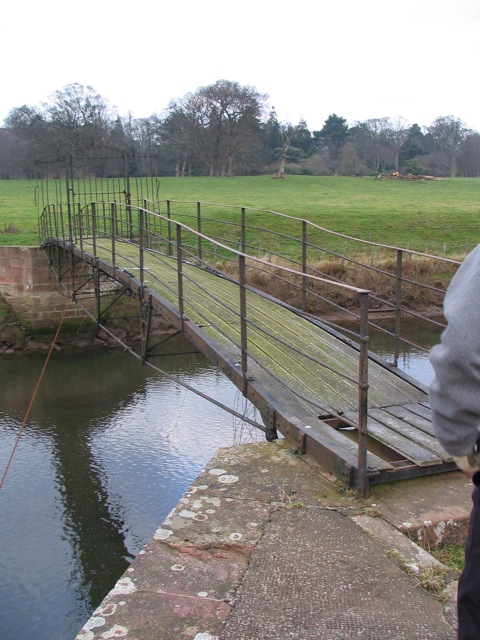
Old Tyne Footbridge at Tyninghame

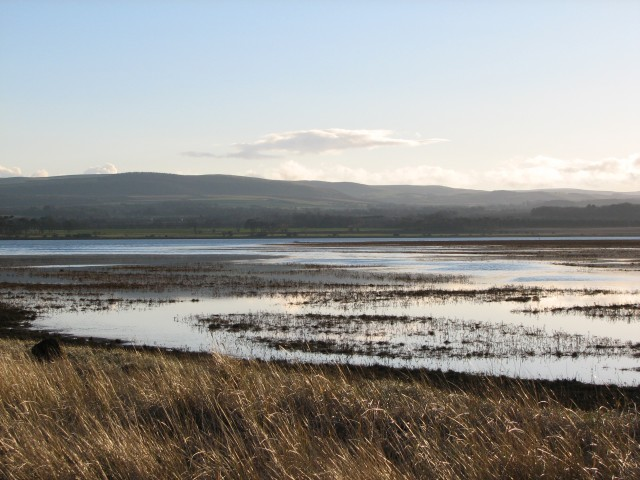
Tyne estuary

== Environment ==
=== Fishing ===
- The East Lothian Angling Association controls 25 miles of the Tyne and its feeder burns; there are Brown trout and sea trout.

== See also ==
- List of rivers in Scotland
- Rivers and Fisheries Trusts of Scotland (RAFTS)
- List of waterway societies in the United Kingdom
- List of navigation authorities in the United Kingdom
- List of places in East Lothian
- List of places in Midlothian
