= George Rennie (agriculturalist) =

Scottish agriculturist

George Rennie (1749–1828) was a Scottish agriculturist.

== Life ==
He was the son of James Rennie, farmer, of Phantassie, Haddingtonshire (now East Lothian), and elder brother of John Rennie, the engineer, born on his father's farm in 1749.

On leaving school he was sent by his father, at the age of sixteen, to Tweedside to make a survey of a new system of farming which had been adopted by Lord Kames, Hume of Ninewells, and other landed gentry of the district. In 1765 he became superintendent of a brewery which his father had erected. The elder Rennie died in 1766, and, after leasing the business for some years, the son conducted it on a large scale from 1783 to 1797, when he finally relinquished it to a tenant. Rennie then devoted himself to the pursuit of agriculture on the Phantassie farmland and in 1787 he employed Andrew Meikle, the eminent millwright (to whom his brother, John Rennie, the engineer, had been apprenticed) to erect one of his drum thrashing-machines. This was driven by water. When Meikle's claims as the inventor were disputed, Rennie wrote a letter in his favour, which was printed in A Reply to an Address to the Public, but more particularly to the Landed Interest of Great Britain and Ireland, on the subject of the Thrashing Machine.

Rennie died on 6 October 1828.

He was one of the authors of A General View of the Agriculture of the West Riding of Yorkshire.... By Messrs. Rennie, Brown, and Shirreff, London, 1794, written for the Board of Agriculture's General View of Agriculture county surveys. Other writing, co-authored by the science writer Robert Brown, discussed the practical application of new techniques. His son, George achieved notability as a sculptor and politician.
