= Hopetoun Monument =

Monument in East Lothian, Scotland

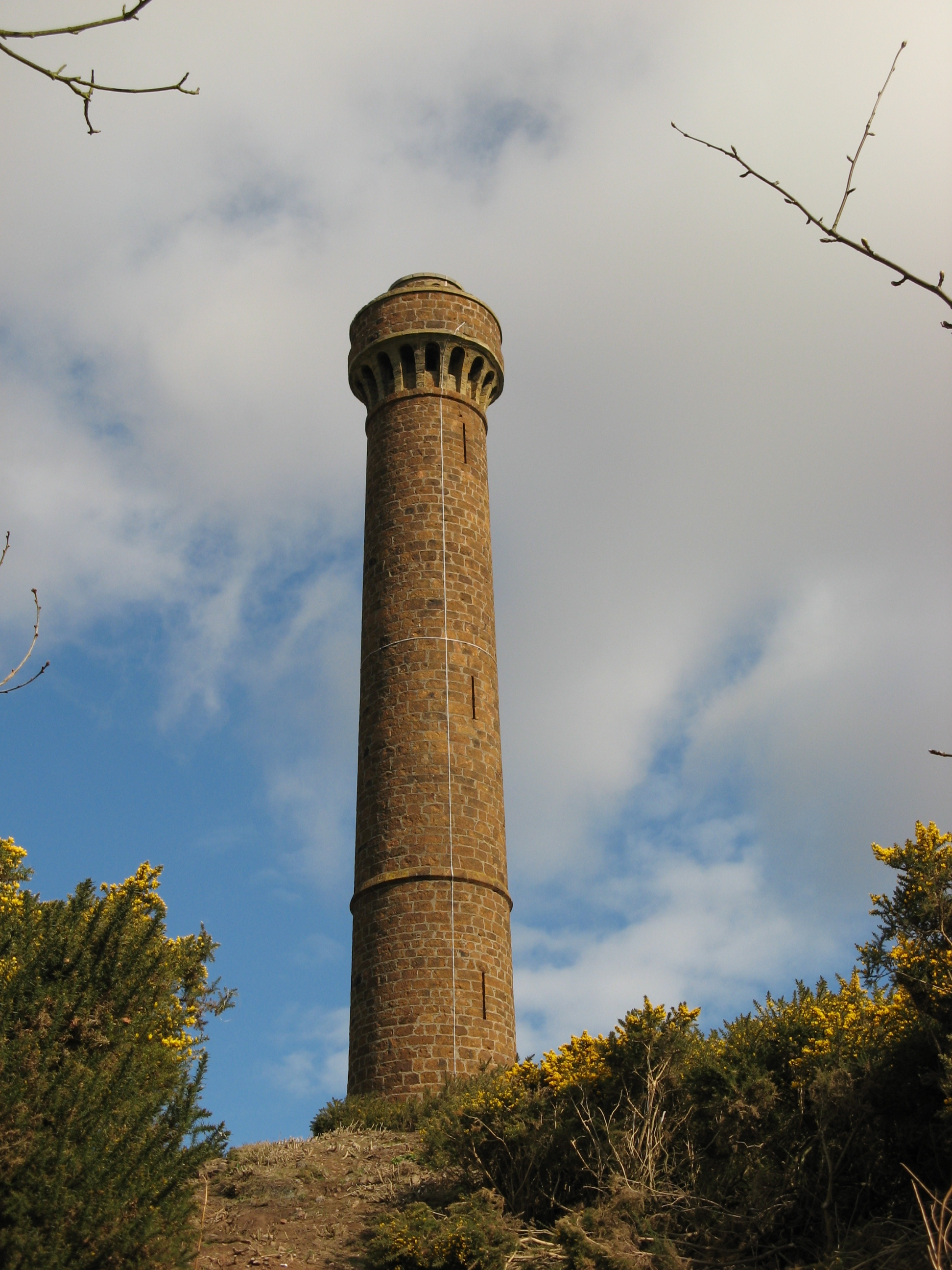
- Interactive map of Hopetoun Monument
- Location: Garleton Hills, East Lothian, Scotland
- Coordinates: 55.977969°N 2.802804°W
- Designer: William Burn
- Type: tower
- Height: 95 ft (29 m)
- Completion date: 1824
- Dedicated to: John Hope

Listed Building – Category B
- Designated: 5 February 1971
- Reference no.: LB10831

The Hopetoun Monument is a monument in the Garleton Hills, near Camptoun, East Lothian, Scotland. It is 95 feet (29 m) tall and is situated on Byres Hill near Haddington.

== History ==
The monument was erected in 1824 in memory of John Hope, 4th Earl of Hopetoun (1765–1823). The foundation stone was laid on May 3, 1824. There is an inscription on the monument which states:

"This monument was erected to the memory of the Great and Good John, Fourth Earl of Hopetoun by his affectionate and grateful tenantry in East Lothian. MDCCCXXIV"

The monument is often referred to as the Garleton Monument or the "Galla Monument" by locals, after Garleton Farm on Byres Hill.

== Features ==
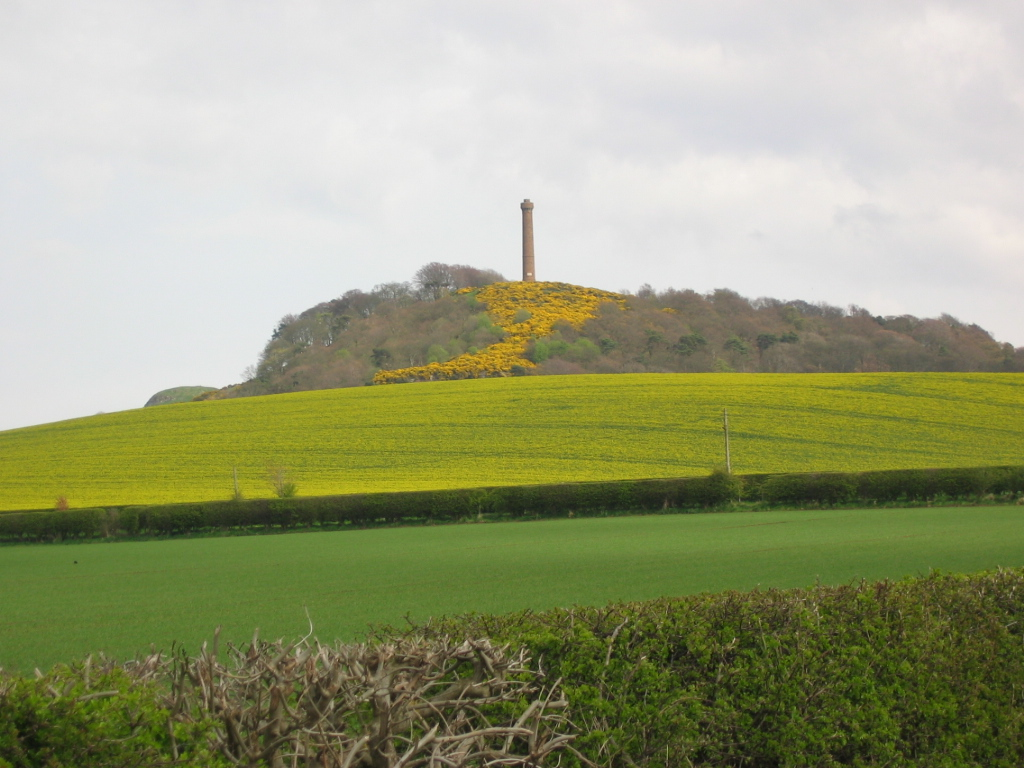
The Hopetoun Monument on Byres Hill

The viewing platform at the top is reached by 132 steps of a dark, narrow, spiral staircase, and offers views of the Firth of Forth and the surrounding countryside. The monument is a category B listed building. A path runs from a small car park at the base of the hill, winding up steeply through wooded slopes, and a corridor of gorse, before coming out onto the open hilltop. The views can be superb: The Firth of Forth and Fife; Edinburgh and the Pentland Hills to the west; and The Lammermuir Hills to the South. On a clear day, it is even possible to glimpse the Cairngorms far away to the North.

A similar monument to the 4th Earl of Hopetoun stands on Mount Hill near Cupar in Fife, and was built in 1826.

== See also ==
- List of places in East Lothian
- Skid Hill
