= Jack Gray =

Jack Gray may refer to:

- Dolly Gray impostor, also known as Jack "Dolly" Gray, unknown American footballer who played in the National Football League in 1922
- Jack Gray (American football), end for the Princeton Tigers and the Green Bay Packers of the NFL
- Jack Gray (basketball) (1911–1992), American college basketball player and coach
- Jack Gray (Canadian football) (1927–2018), Canadian football player for the Toronto Argonauts
- Jack Gray (choreographer), choreographer of contemporary Māori dance in New Zealand
- Jack Gray (footballer, born 1885) (1885–1950), Australian rules footballer for Geelong
- Jack Gray (footballer, born 1916) (1916–2008), Australian rules footballer for Footscray
- Jack L. Gray (1927–1981), Canadian marine artist
- Jack Gray-Spence (1910–1992), Australian rugby league and rugby union player
- Jack Gray (musician), Australian singer and songwriter

== See also ==
- John Gray (disambiguation)
- Jonathan Gray (disambiguation)
