= Johnny Gray (disambiguation) =

Johnny Gray (born 1960) is an American former runner.

Johnny Gray may also refer to:

== Sports ==
- Johnny Gray (baseball) (1926–2014), American baseball player
- Johnny Gray (drag racing) (born 1953), American drag racer
- Johnnie Gray (born 1953), American football player
- Jonny Gray (born 1962), British army officer and sports executive
- Jonny Gray (born 1994), Scottish rugby union player

== Others ==
- Johnny Grey (born 1951), British designer
- Jonny Gray (actor) (born 1999), Canadian actor

== See also ==
- John Gray (disambiguation)
- Jonathan Gray (disambiguation)
