= Mount Hill =

Mount Hill may refer to

- Mount Hill (Antarctica), a mountain in Palmer Land, Antarctica
- Mount Hill (Scotland), a hill in Fife, Scotland
- Mount Hill (South Australia), a peak in South Australia on the eastern side of southern Eyre Peninsula
