= Garleton Hills =

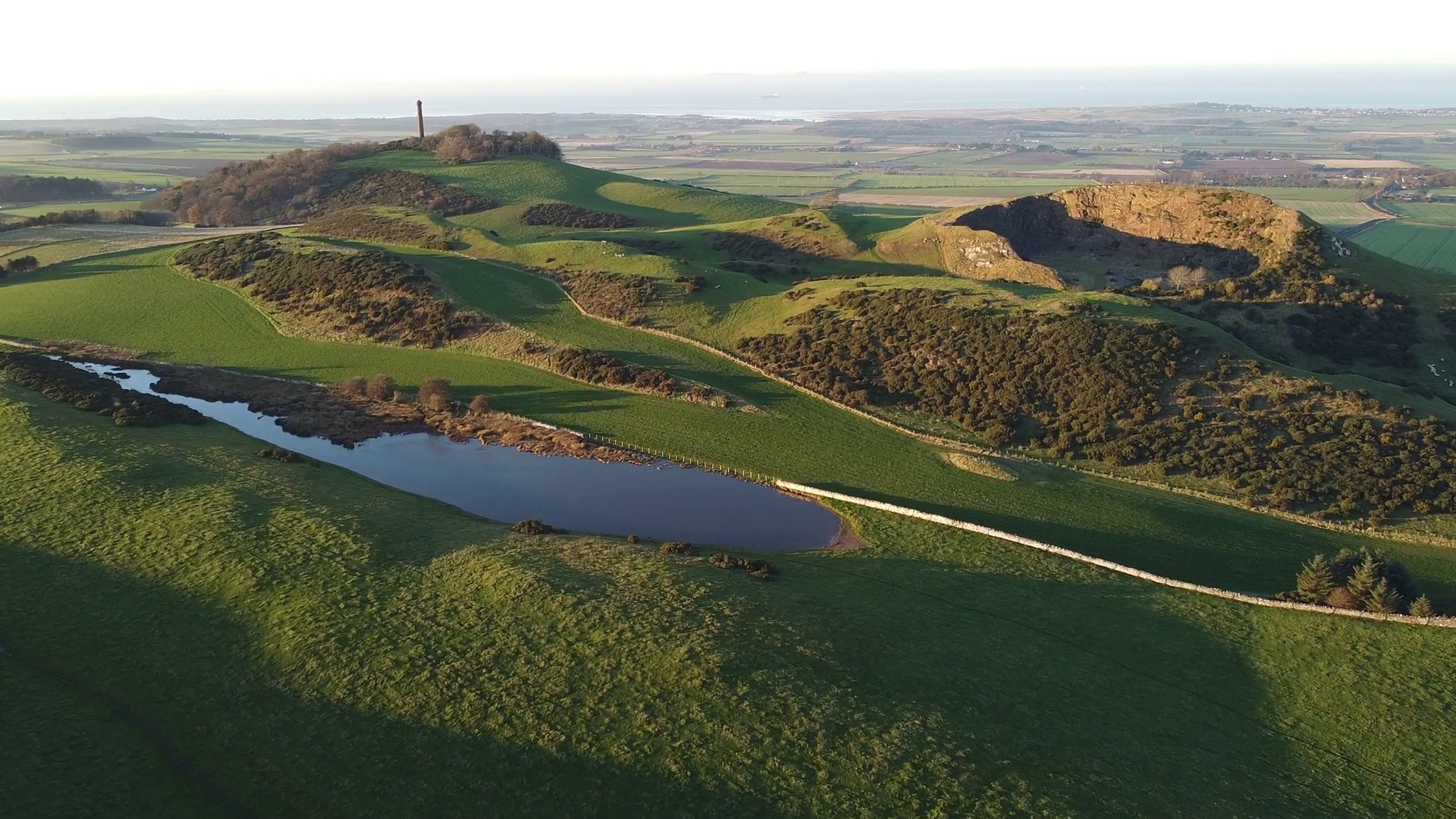
- Garleton Hills and Hopetoun Monument

Highest point
- Peak: Skid Hill
- Elevation: 186 m (610 ft)
- Prominence: 98
- Coordinates: 55°58′42″N 2°47′29″W

Geography
- Location within Scotland
- Location: East Lothian
- Country: United Kingdom
- Region: Scotland

Geology
- Rock age: Carboniferous

The Garleton Hills, in East Lothian, Scotland, are a range of igneous hills, to the north of Haddington.

== Geography ==
Although Skid Hill, the highest point of the range, is only 610 feet (190 m), the hills are conspicuous throughout the county. The western spur is crowned by the Hopetoun Monument to John, 4th Earl of Hopetoun, who commanded the British Army in the Peninsular War, after the death of Sir John Moore at Corunna. Barnes Castle is built on south, while Garleton Castle is on the north slopes.

== Geology ==
The Garleton Hills create an obvious ridge, from the top of the ridge there are wide views over the lower lying areas of East Lothian. The hills are made up of layers of igneous rocks from the Carboniferous which show differing resistance to erosion. In some places the volcanic rocks are both overlaid and underlaid with sandstones. In the volcanic sequence of the hills there is hard basalt lying over trachytic lavas. Glacial erosion has varied according to the variations in the resistance of the rocks. The trachytes slope to the south south east and have been moulded into cuestas, or volcanic trap steps, by the ice. There is a steep north facing scarp with a short dip slope lying to the south of the scarp. The flow of ice and meltwater along the strike of the ridge has eroded furrows and channels. Around the village of Athelstaneford there is a rock basin which has been partly gouged out of the softer basalts.

The hills are designated by Scottish Natural Heritage as a Geological Conservation Review site (nr. 1155) and as Site of Special Scientific Interest by the British Geological Survey as Site of Special Scientific Interest (code of the site: 671).
