= John Hamilton Gray =

John Hamilton Gray may refer to two 19th-century Canadian politicians:

- John Hamilton Gray (Prince Edward Island politician) (1811–1887), Premier of Prince Edward Island
- John Hamilton Gray (New Brunswick politician) (1814–1889), Premier of New Brunswick

== See also ==
- John Gray (disambiguation)
