= John Grey =

There is the homophone name John Gray. John Grey may refer to:

== People ==
=== 14th, 15th, and 16th centuries ===
- Sir John de Grey (died 1266), English soldier and high sheriff.
- Sir John de Grey, 1st Baron Grey de Rotherfield (c.1300–1359), founding member and 14th Knight of the Order of the Garter in 1348
- John de Grey, 2nd Baron Grey of Rotherfield (1320–1375), 2nd Baron Grey of Rotherfield
- John Grey (MP for Bedford), MP for Bedford 1406
- John Grey (Devon MP) (died 1413), MP for Totnes, Exeter and Barnstaple
- John Grey, 1st Earl of Tankerville (1384–1421), 1st Earl of Tankerville
- John Grey, 2nd Baron Grey de Wilton (died 1323), English peer and Parliamentarian
- John Grey, 8th Baron Grey de Wilton (died 1498), 8th Baron Grey de Wilton
- John Grey (knight) (c. 1387–1439), English soldier of the Hundred Years' War
- John Grey of Groby (c. 1432–1461), first husband of Queen Elizabeth Woodville
- John Grey, 2nd Viscount Lisle (1480–1504), British peer
- Lord John Grey (Tudor nobleman) (1523/24–1564)
- John Grey (died 1594), MP for Staffordshire

=== 18th, 19th, and 20th centuries ===
- John Grey (Staffordshire MP) (died 1709), Staffordshire politician
- John Grey (British Army officer, died 1760)
- John Grey (MP for Bridgnorth) (c. 1724–1777), British politician and Clerk of the Green Cloth
- John Grey (British Army officer, died 1856), former Commander-in-Chief of the Bombay Army
- John Grey (land agent) (1785–1868), English land agent and agriculturist
- John Grey (1815–1875), accepted alternate spelling of John Gray (Irish politician)
- John Grey (screenwriter) (1873–1933), American screenwriter
- John Grey (Australian general) (born 1939), Lieutenant General, Chief of Army (Australia) 1992–1995
- Johnny Grey (born 1951), British designer of kitchens
- John Grey, singer on !Hero

== Characters ==
- Mr John Grey, a character in Anthony Trollope's mid-1860s novel Can You Forgive Her?
- Dr. John Grey (comics), a character in X-Men, father of superhero Jean Grey
- Lord John Grey (character), a character from Diana Gabaldon's Outlander series

== Other ==
- John Grey & Sons, a manufacturer of musical instruments
- John Grey, a barque wrecked in Mount's Bay in 1867
- "Johnny Grey", a song by Eiffel 65 from their album Contact!

== See also ==
- John Gray (disambiguation)
- Jonathan Gray (disambiguation)
