= John Gray =

John Gray may refer to:

== Politics and government ==
=== Australia ===
- John Gray (New South Wales politician) (1840–1914), Australian senator
- John Gray (Victorian politician, died 1925) (c. 1853–1925), member of the Victorian Legislative Assembly
- John Austin Gray (1892–1939), member of the Victorian Legislative Assembly

=== Canada ===
- John Hamilton Gray (Prince Edward Island politician) (1811–1887), premier of Prince Edward Island
- John Hamilton Gray (New Brunswick politician) (1814–1889), premier of New Brunswick
- John Gray (Ontario politician) (1837–1917), member of the Legislative Assembly of Ontario
- John Gray (Oshawa politician) (born 1959), mayor of Oshawa, Ontario

=== New Zealand ===
- John Gray (New Zealand politician) (1801–1859), member of the New Zealand Parliament

=== United Kingdom ===
- John Gray (socialist) (1799–1883), English economic pamphleteer, utopian socialist, and exponent of Ricardian economics
- Sir John Gray (Irish politician) (1815–1875), Irish member of parliament for Kilkenny, 1865–1875
- Sir John Gray (diplomat) (1936–2003), British diplomat

=== United States ===
- John Gray (North Carolina politician), member of the North Carolina General Assembly of 1777
- John Gray, member of the Virginia House of Delegates, 1800–1821
- John C. Gray (1783–1823), United States representative from Virginia
- John Gray (Wisconsin politician, born 1817) (1817–?), member of the Wisconsin State Assembly
- John S. Gray (Idaho politician) (1833–1891), lieutenant governor of Idaho
- John H. Gray (Illinois politician) (1855–?), Illinois state representative
- John Gray (North Dakota politician) (1877–1952), North Dakota state treasurer
- John R. Gray (politician) (1925−1996), member of the Wisconsin State Assembly

== Law and crime ==
- John Gray (barrister) (1807–1875), British barrister and legal writer
- John Chipman Gray (1839–1915), American law professor and legal scholar
- John Clinton Gray (1843–1915), American judge in New York
- John Joe Gray (1950–2023), fugitive from the law in Trinidad, Texas, United States

== Military ==
- John Gray (American Revolutionary War soldier) (1764–1868), U.S. soldier, said to be the longest surviving veteran of the war
- John Gray (Medal of Honor) (1836–1887), Medal of Honor recipient in the American Civil War
- Sir John Gray (Royal Navy officer) (1913–1998), British admiral
- John P. Gray (naval officer) (1914–1942), United States Navy officer, pilot, and Navy Cross recipient

== Arts and humanities ==
=== Literature and music ===
- John Gray (Canadian author) (1937–2020), Canadian journalist and biographer
- John Gray (American author) (born 1951), American author best known for his book Men Are from Mars, Women Are from Venus
- John Gray (composer), Australian film composer, writer of the score for 2006 film The Bet
- John Gray (mythologist) (1913–2000), Scottish author of books on history and mythology
- John Gray (poet) (1866–1934), English poet and Catholic priest
- John MacLachlan Gray (born 1946), Canadian writer, playwright and composer of musicals

=== Visual art ===
- John Gray (1811–1891), Scottish engineer and philanthropist for whom the Gray's School of Art is named
- John Miller Gray (1850–1894), Scottish art critic and curator

=== Other arts and humanities ===
- John Gray (museum administrator), American museum director
- John Gray (philosopher) (born 1948), British philosopher

== Religion ==
- John Gray (Episcopalian minister) (1646–1717), minister of the Episcopal Church of Scotland
- John Gray (Scottish bishop) (1817–1872), Roman Catholic vicar apostolic for Western Scotland
- John Gray (archdeacon of Hong Kong) (1823–1890), Archdeacon of Hong Kong
- John R. Gray (minister) (1913–1984), Moderator of the General Assembly of the Church of Scotland in 1977
- John Gray (New Zealand bishop) (1947–2015), New Zealand Anglican bishop

== Science, medicine and technology ==
- John Gray (mathematician) (died 1769), Scottish mathematician, author and Rector of Aberdeen University
- John Edward Gray (1800–1875), British zoologist
- John Franklin Gray (1804–1881), American educator and physician, first practitioner of homeopathy in the United States
- John Gray (locomotive engineer), locomotive superintendent of the London Brighton and South Coast Railway, 1845–1847
- John P. Gray (psychiatrist) (1825–1886), American psychiatrist
- John McFarlane Gray (1831–1908), Scottish engineer
- John H. Gray (economist) (1859–1946), American economist
- Sir John Gray (physiologist) (1918–2011), British physiologist
- John Stuart Gray (1941–2007), British-Norwegian marine biologist

== Business ==
- John Gray (Canadian banker) (c. 1755–1829), president of the Bank of Montreal
- John Gray, British founder of Gray and Davison pipe organ builders in 1841
- John S. Gray (businessman) (1841–1906), Scottish-born American candymaker, businessman, and first president of Ford Motor Company
- John Gray (British banker) (1934–2009), British banker

== Sport ==
- John Gray (Australian footballer) (1888–1947), Australian rules footballer for Melbourne University FC and medical doctor
- John Gray (runner, born 1894) (1894–1942), American Olympic runner
- John Gray (boxer) (1906–1964), Filipino Olympic boxer
- Johnny Gray (baseball) (1926–2014), American baseball pitcher
- John Gray (English sportsman) (born 1948), English cricketer, and rugby union and rugby league footballer
- John Gray (ice hockey) (born 1949), Canadian ice hockey player
- Johnny Gray (born 1960), American runner

== Broadcasting and entertainment ==
- John MacLachlan Gray (born 1946), Canadian playwright, composer, and performer
- John Gray (director), American writer and director
- John J. Gray, American television writer and producer
- John Gray, television news anchor on WXXA-TV in Albany, New York

== Ships ==
- MV John Hamilton Gray, Canadian icebreaking railway, vehicle, and passenger ferry
- USS John P. Gray (APD-74), United States Navy high-speed transport

== Other ==
- John Gray (master mariner) (1819–1872), British captain of the SS Great Britain
- John Gray (nightwatchman) (died 1858), owner of Greyfriars Bobby
- John E. Gray (1907–2002), American educational administrator and businessman, president of Lamar University
- John Hunter Gray (1934–2019), American sociologist and civil rights activist

== See also ==
- Jon Gray (born 1991), American baseball player
- John de Gray (died 1214), Bishop of Norwich
- John Grey (disambiguation)
- Jonathan Gray (disambiguation)
- Jack Gray (disambiguation)
