= Knox Academy =

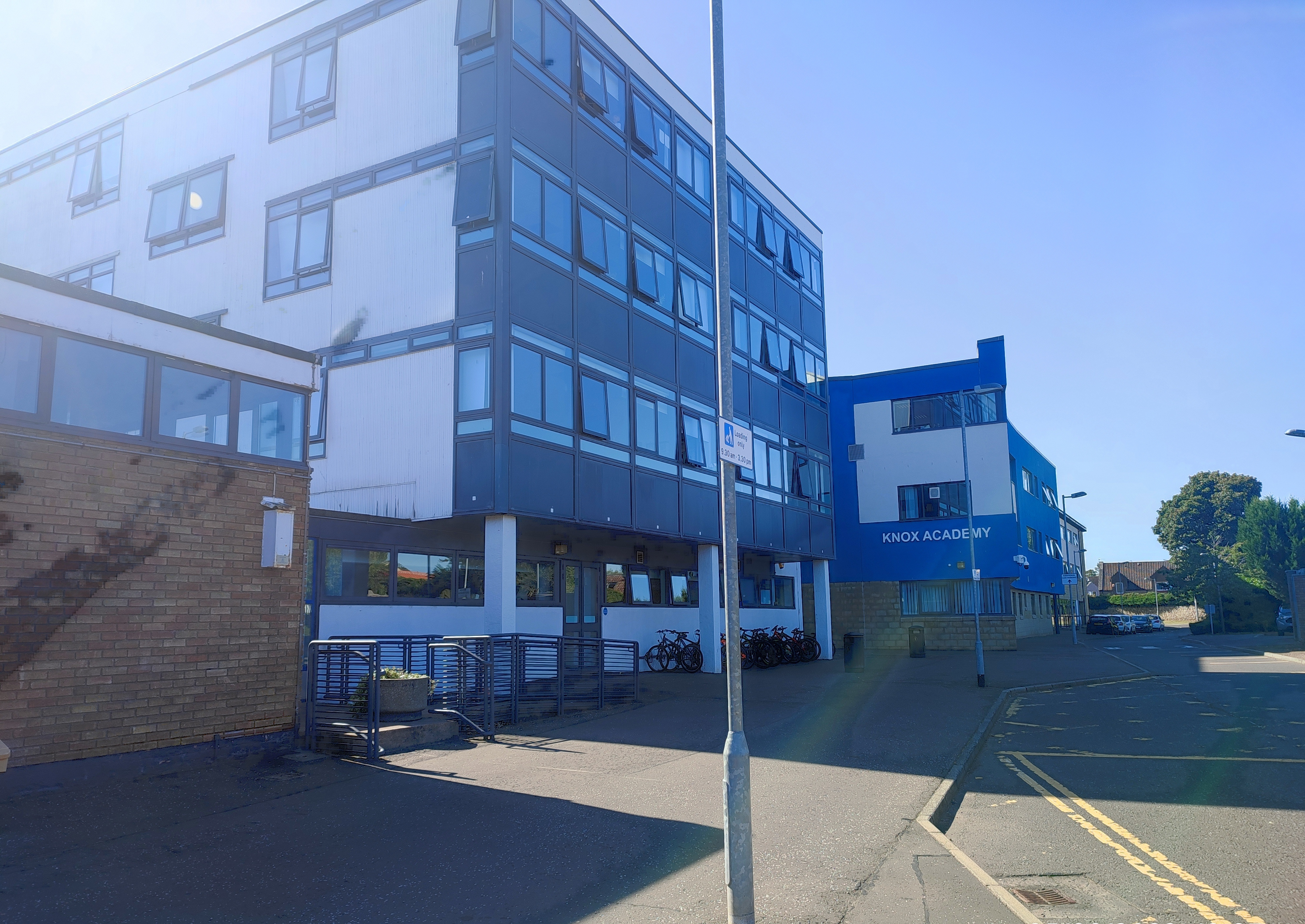

Location
- Pencaitland Road; Haddington, East Lothian, EH41 4DT; Scotland; 55°57′12″N 2°47′14″W

Information
- Type: State secondary school
- Motto: Ambition, Respect, Community
- Religious affiliation: Non-denominational
- Established: 1379; 647 years ago
- Local authority: East Lothian Council
- Head teacher: Susan Cook
- Gender: Mixed
- Enrollment: 796 (February 2021)
- Houses: Garleton; Lammerlaw; Traprain
- Website: www.ka-net.org.uk

Knox Academy is a co-educational state secondary school located in Haddington, East Lothian, Scotland. Originally founded in 1379 as a medieval grammar school, it is one of the oldest schools in the world.

== History ==
The modern school can be traced back to a late medieval grammar school, founded in 1379 in Haddington, East Lothian. It was not until 1879 that it was first dedicated to John Knox, and named the Knox Memorial Institute to mark the construction of a new building designed by John Starforth. Though it no longer houses the school, this historic structure is now a listed building and remains in private use, located on the same street as the modern Knox Academy.

In 1930, construction began of a replacement campus on the current site, which was further extended in 1960. During this period, the school became known as Knox Academy for the first time. In 2005, a major refurbishment and rebuild of the school was completed.

In June 2012, head teacher Janis Craig retired after fifteen years in the role. During the 2016–17 academic year, Molly Young, a pupil at the school, was injured in an acid attack by a pupil in the same year. The incident was widely covered in the national press, and following a second violent incident, Lauren Rodger, head teacher of North Berwick High School, was seconded to the school as acting headteacher.

The current head teacher is Susan Cook, formerly acting head teacher at Trinity Academy, Edinburgh. In 2018, it was announced that an extension of the school would be required by 2024 in order to meet demand from new housing developments in the area.

== Meadowpark ==
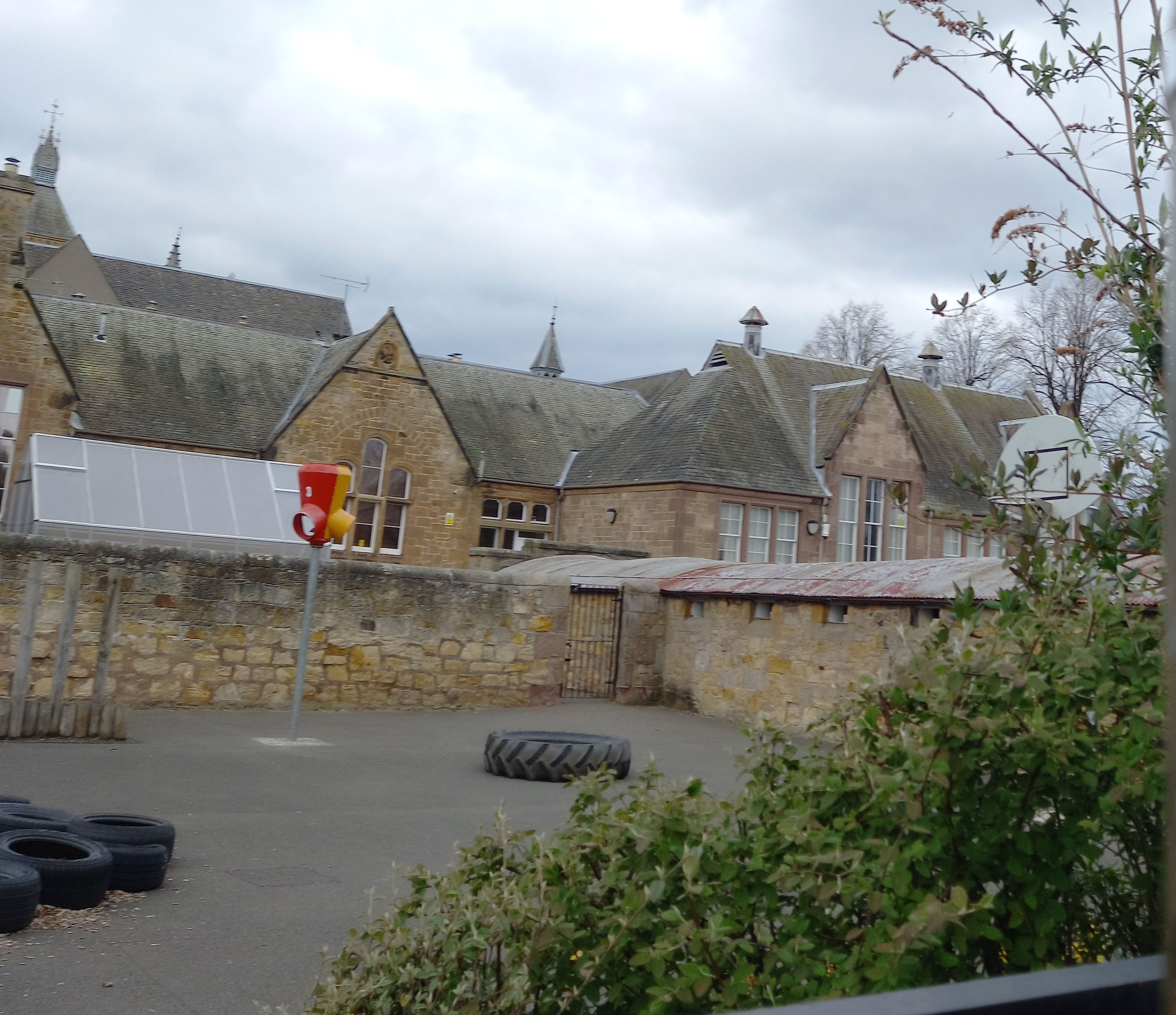
The front entrance of Meadowpark

Meadowpark opened in 2016 and supports learners with special educational needs. While part of Knox Academy, it is currently headed up by Steven Johnson. it primarily operates within dedicated buildings which are located separately to the main campus.

== Cadet Force ==
Knox Academy was the last state school in Scotland to have a Combined Cadet Force, the Knox CCF. The CCF was disbanded in 2010 due to disagreements between the school and the Ministry of Defence over the storage of weapons on school grounds.

== Notable alumni ==
=== The Grammar School ===
- Walter Bower (c. 1385–1449), chronicler and clergyman
- John Major (philosopher) (1467–1550)
- John Knox (c. 1514–1572) protestant reformer
- James Carmichael (1542/3–1628) church minister, schoolmaster and author of a Latin grammar and a collection of proverbs in Scots
- John Witherspoon (1723–1794), signatory to the United States Declaration of Independence
- Richard Gall (1776–1801), poet
- Sir Peter Laurie (1778–1861), Lord Mayor of London
- Thomas Burns (1796–1871), early settler in Otago, New Zealand
- Janet Mouat (1867 -1951), UK woman doctor, registered in 1900
- William George Gillies (1898-1973), renowned Scottish landscape and still life painter

=== Knox Academy ===
- Callum Booth, professional footballer
- Danny Handling, professional footballer
- Grant McKelvey, professional rugby player and coach
- Cameron Murray (rugby union), professional rugby player
- Joel Sked, TV presenter, podcaster and sports journalist

== See also ==
- List of the oldest schools in the United Kingdom
