= Mount Hill (Scotland) =

Hill in Fife, Scotland

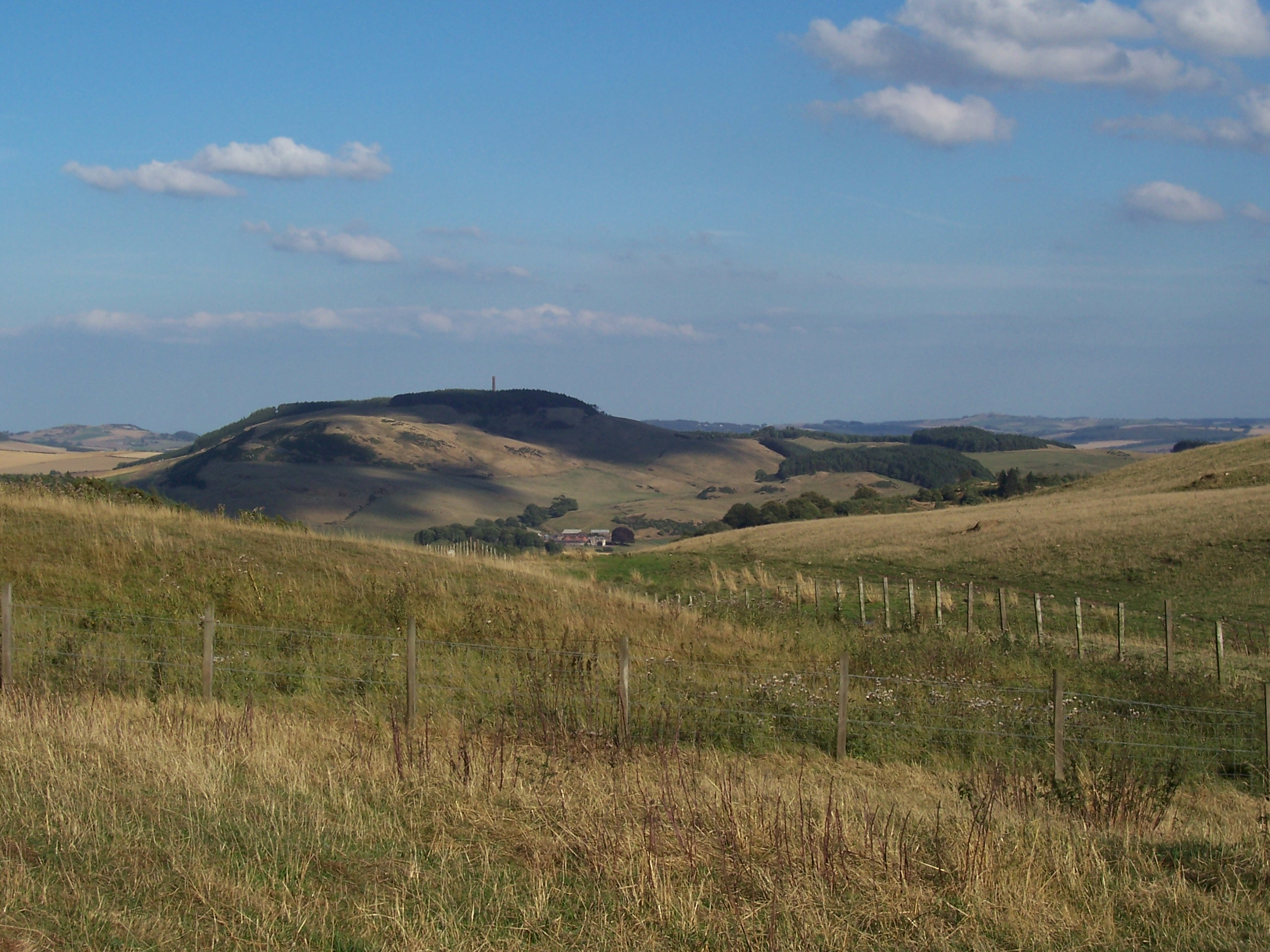
- Mount Hill from Dunbog Hill

Highest point
- Elevation: 221 m (725 ft)
- Prominence: 163 m (535 ft)
- Listing: Marilyn
- Coordinates: 56°20′10″N 3°05′01″W

Geography
- Location within Scotland
- Location: Fife, Scotland
- Parent range: Ochil Hills
- OS grid: NO331164
- Topo map: OS Landranger 59

Mount Hill rises from the rolling farmland about three miles north west of Cupar in North East Fife, Scotland. On its summit stands the 29-metre (95 ft) high Hopetoun Monument, which is visible for many miles around.

The Hopetoun Monument was erected by the people of Cupar in 1826 in memory of the British soldier John Hope, 4th Earl of Hopetoun (1765–1823). The monument takes the form of a giant Roman Doric column, and is protected as a category B listed building. The inscription on the monument reads:

"To perpetuate the memory of John 4th Earl of Hopetoun who died 16 August 1823, this memorial is erected by the inhabitants of Fife MDCCCXXVI"

Prior to succeeding to the earldom, John Hope served at the Battle of Alexandria in 1801 and, later, in the Peninsular War (1808–1814) where he was knighted for his heroic deeds at the Battle of Corunna. There is another similar Hopetoun Monument on Byres Hill near Haddington in East Lothian which was built in 1824.

At present the summit of Mount Hill affords an excellent panorama due to the felling of the forestry plantation around the monument. The monument is easily accessible by forest tracks.

David Lyndsay of the Mount gains his epithet from the farm on the eastern slopes.

== Gallery ==
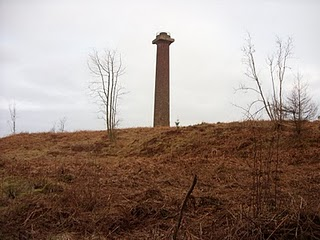
Hopetoun Monument, Mount Hill, Cupar

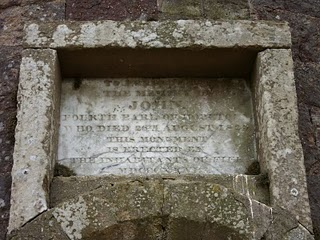
Dedication stone Hopetoun Monument, Mount Hill, Cupar
