= Janet Mouat =

UK woman doctor before World War I

Janet Ainslie Sheills Mouat M.B., B.S.
- Born: 23 January 1867; Haddington, East Lothian
- Died: 6 February 1951 (aged 84); Sidmouth
- Education: Edinburgh College of Medicine for Women

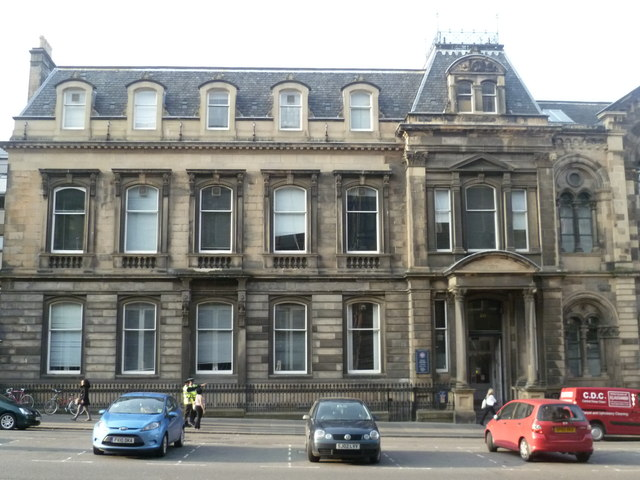
Edinburgh College of Medicine for Women (Minto House)

Janet Mouat M.B., B.S (23 January 1867 - 6 February 1951) was a Scottish woman doctor before World War I. She qualified in Edinburgh in 1900, when it was difficult for women to complete training and register as a practising doctor.

== Early life and education ==
Janet Ainslie Sheills Mouat was born in Haddington, Scotland, on 23 January 1867 to Alexander Mouat and Helen Ainslie Louden, the eldest of six children. She was educated at the Knox Academy, Haddington, winning the Hutchison gold medal for overall performance (1882-83), as well as prizes in English, French, German, Latin and Arithmetic and then studied at the Edinburgh College of Medicine for Women in Minto House, Edinburgh. Mouat was registered as a practicing doctor on 28 June 1900.

== Death ==
Mouat died in Sidmouth, Devon on 6 February 1951.
