= Walter Dexter (British artist) =

English painter

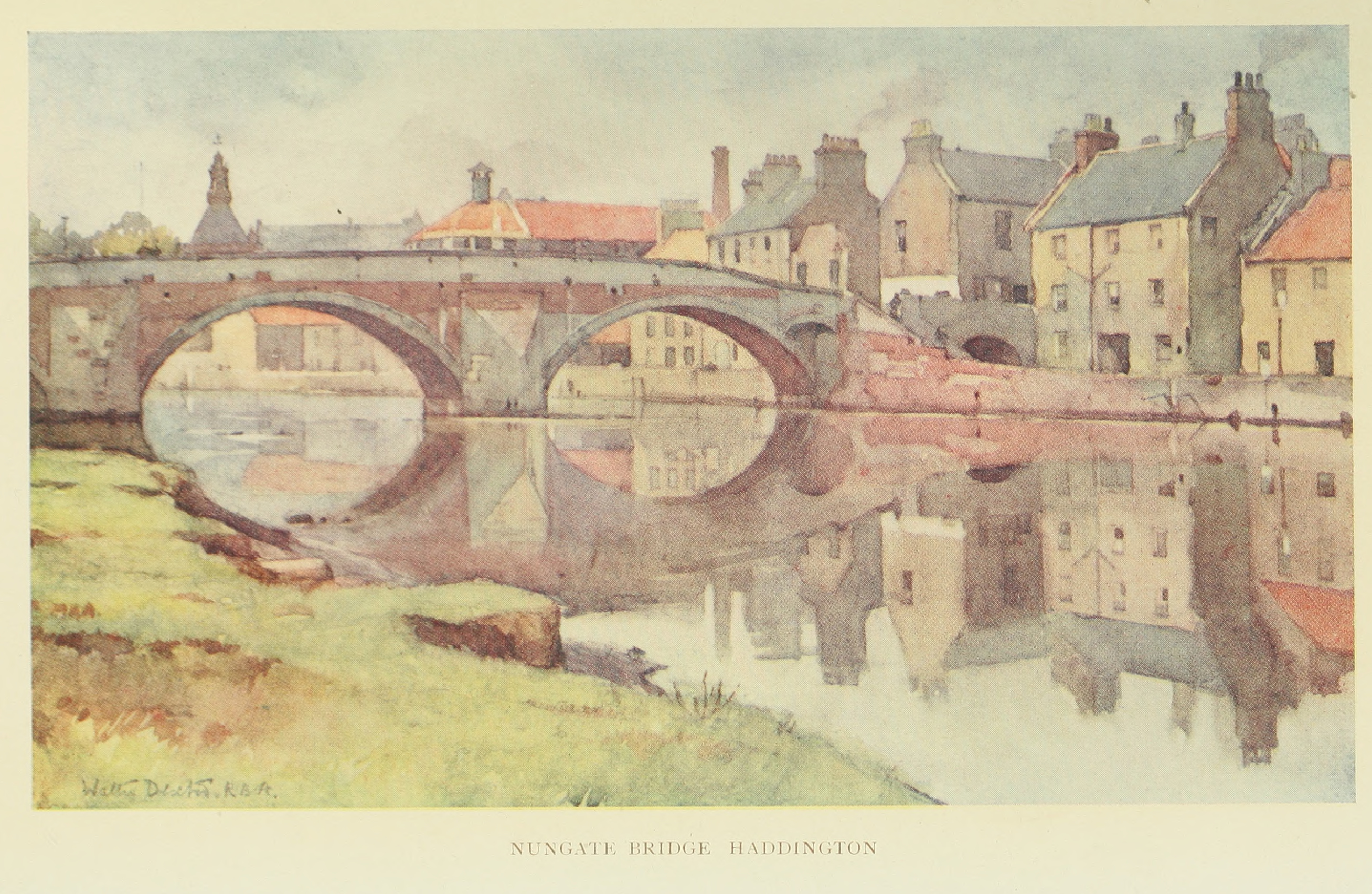
Nungate Bridge, Haddington by Walter Dexter

Walter Dexter RBA (12 June 1876 – 12 February 1958) was an English artist, painting in oil and watercolour. He lived in King's Lynn for much of his life, and many of his pictures show the area.

== Life ==
Dexter was born in Wellingborough in Northamptonshire, son of Walter Sothern Dexter, a photographic artist, and his wife Emily. The family came from King's Lynn; they returned there, and Walter was educated in the town. He was also taught to paint by Henry Baines (1823–1894; a well-known artist of West Norfolk and brother of Thomas Baines).

From 1892 to 1897 he trained at the Birmingham School of Art, and also studied in Belgium and Holland, afterwards returning to King's Lynn. In 1915 he married Helen Chadwick; they had no children.

He was an art teacher at Bolton Grammar School from 1916 to 1920. From 1941 to 1944 he was art teacher at King Edward VII School, King's Lynn. He was a member of the Norfolk and Norwich Art Circle from 1902 to 1955, and was elected a member of the Royal Society of British Artists.

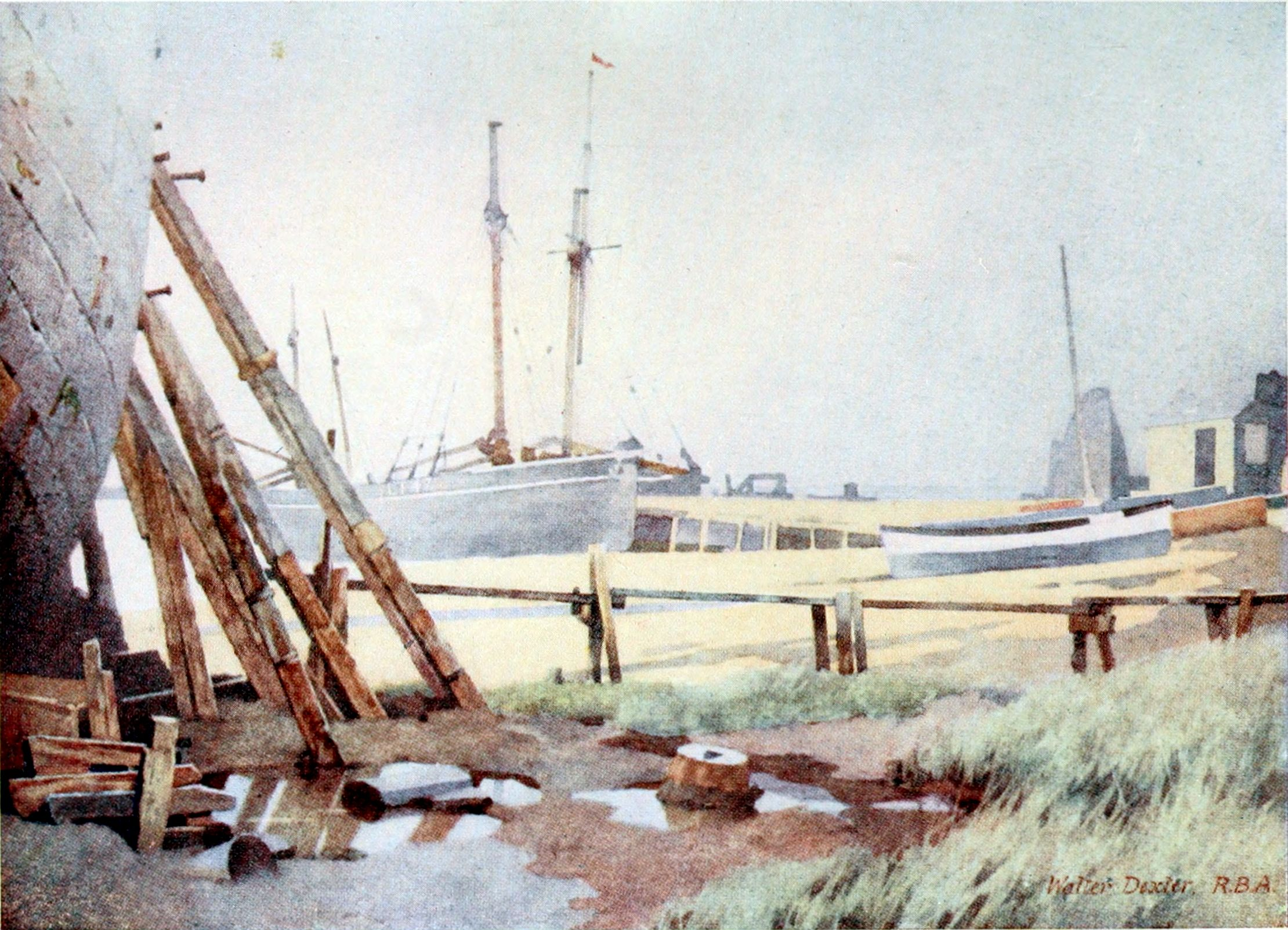
Slaughden Quay, Aldeburgh

Dexter painted in oil and watercolour, painting landscapes, including many of the King's Lynn area; also interiors, portraits and still life; he exhibited in many galleries. His picture The Carpenter's Workshop, an oil painting of 1904, has been regarded as his best work. He wrote regularly about Norfolk for the East Anglian Evening News and the Eastern Daily Press. Also working as a commercial artist, he illustrated books and produced posters.

He died in 1958, as a result of a collision with a motorcyclist while crossing a road in King's Lynn.
