= St Martin's Church, Haddington =

Ruined medieval church in East Lothian, Scotland

Coordinates: 55°57′22″N 2°46′08″W

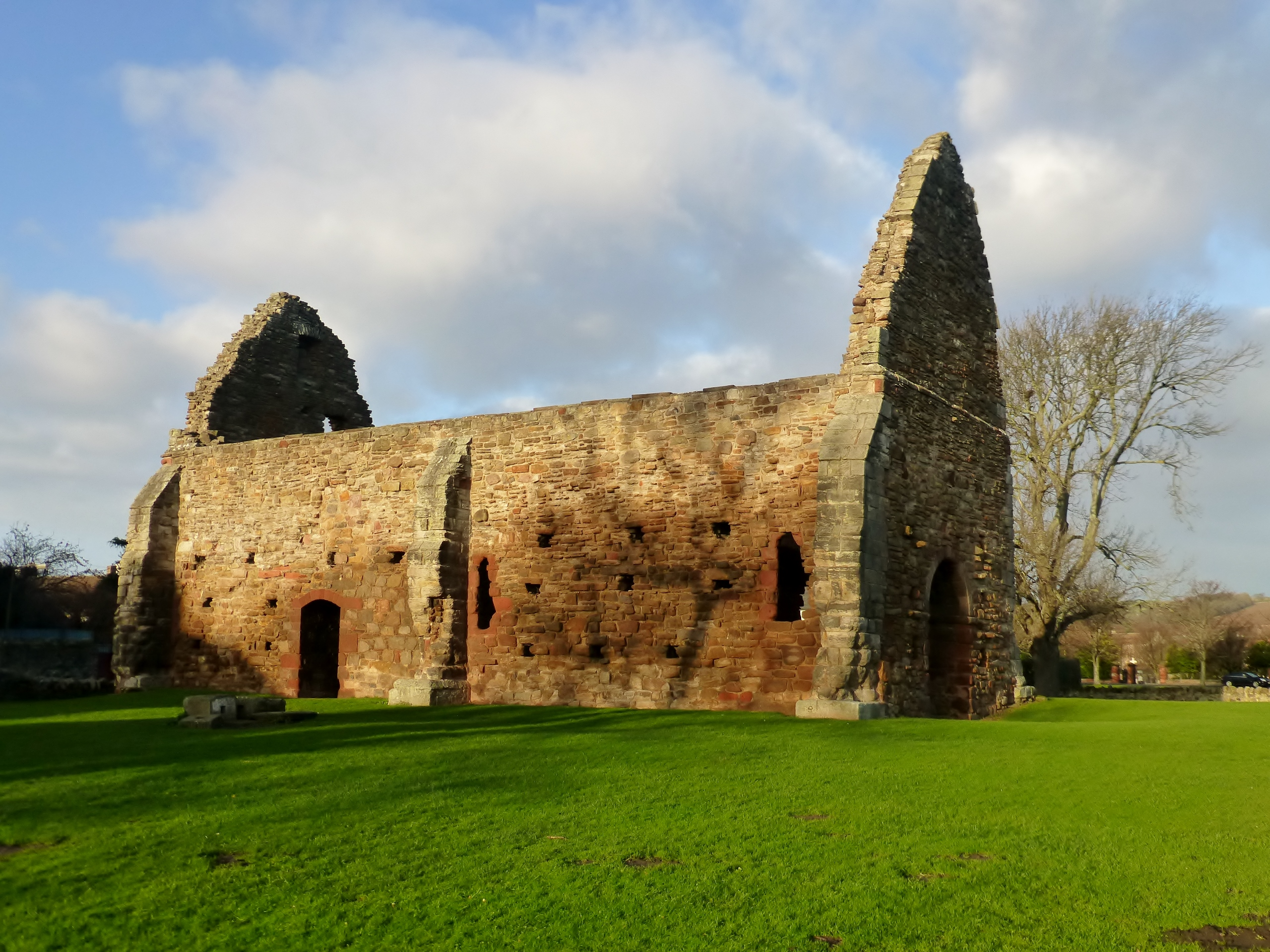
St Martin's Church, Haddington

St Martin's Church, Haddington is a ruined church in the town of Haddington, East Lothian, Scotland. A rare example of a 12th-century parish church, it was originally attached to the nunnery of St Mary's at Nungate. The nunnery was later destroyed by the English. St Martin's continued to function as a Protestant place of worship after the Reformation. It later fell into decay and was abandoned. Historic Environment Scotland established the site as a scheduled monument in 1921.

== Description ==
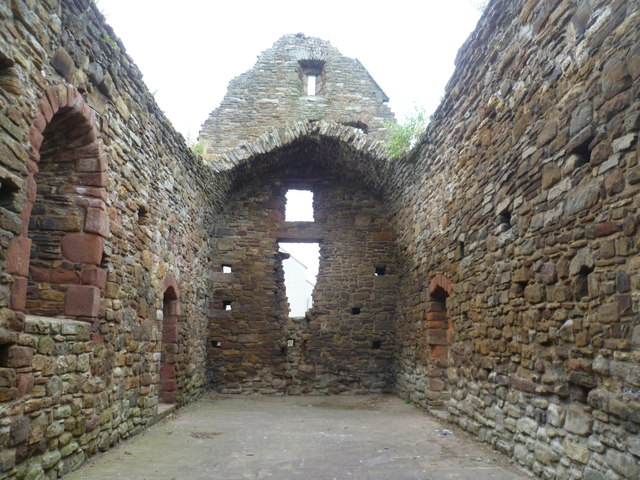
Interior of St Martin's church

The ruined church, originally dedicated to St Martin, is located in the Haddington suburb of Nungate in East Lothian, Scotland. Rectangular in design, the church originally consisted of a nave and chancel. The roofless nave is the only surviving section of the original medieval structure. Constructed in the mid-12th century, the building was remodelled during the 13th century when vaulting and six external buttresses were added.

The surviving nave measures 16.84 m (55.2 ft) by 5.03 m (16.5 ft). The walls are built of irregularly coursed red sandstone with ashlar dressings. Interesting features include the pointed barrel-vault which survives at the west end of the building and a round chancel arch. Doorways exist on the north and south walls. Narrow round-headed windows survive on both the north and south. The remains of a round-headed piscina with basin lies to the south of the chancel arch.

== History ==
St Martin's Church was founded in the 12th century as a chapel of the nunnery of St Mary's, Haddington. One of the largest nunneries in Scotland, St Mary's was founded by Ada de Warenne, Countess of Northumberland, between 1152 and 1159. The nunnery was attacked and burned by the English in 1335 and two centuries later in 1544. After the reformation, the buildings were dismantled and incorporated into the farm of Abbeymill. By 1853, there were no visible remains of the church above ground.

Scottish minister, Reformed theologian, and reformer, John Knox (1514–1572), who was born in Nungate, is believed to have attended St. Martin's parish church. In the 17th century, St Martin's became a Protestant place of worship. At a later, unknown date, the church fell into disrepair and was abandoned. In 1911 the property was taken into state care. Historic Environment Scotland established the site as a scheduled monument in 1921.
