= John Gray (mythologist) =

John Gray (born 9 June 1913 in Kelso, Scotland; died 1 April 2000) was a Biblical Scholar and author of books about the religion, mythology and the culture of ancient Mesopotamia and the Near East. , including his 1969 book Near Eastern Mythology.

John Gray was born in Kelso, the son of a tailor, but brought up in nearby Kirk Yetholm. From Kelso High School he went up to Edinburgh University, graduating in BA in 1935, with a first in classics, followed by a BD with Distinction in Old Testament studies. He then spent some time in Greece and the Holy Land, as well as a period of Ugaritic study in Germany. He was ordained into the Church of Scotland in 1939 and returned to the Holy Land where he spent two and half years as chaplain to the Palestine police. He returned to Scotland in 1941 and married Jenny Gibson from Ayrshire in 1942. He was then inducted to the parish of Kilmory on Arran where he worked on his Ph.D thesis on the recently discovered Ugaritic texts. John was fluent in several languages, not only biblical Hebrew and Ugaritic, but classical and colloquial Arabic, German and Norwegian (which he learned on the cargo ship which carried him back from Palestine to Scotland in 1941).

In 1947 John moved to Manchester University as lecturer in Semitic languages. In 1953 he became a lecturer in Hebrew and Biblical Criticism at Aberdeen University, where he became of professor in 1962. As well as three years as Dean of the Faculty of Divinity and lecturing, he wrote prodigiously, taking only one full year off in 1972 as visiting professor at McMaster University, Hamilton, Ontario. In 1977 he was awarded the honorary degree of Doctor of Divinity by St Andrews University. He retired to his native Roxburghshire in 1980. He was a keen piper and fiddler - and enjoyed writing dialect poetry. After his death his translation of the biblical Book of Job into Roxburghshire dialect (Job in a Cheviot Plaid) was privately published by his family.

== Bibliography ==
- The Keret Text (Ugaritic), 1955
- Legacy of Canaan (corpus texts), 1957
- I & II Kings: A Commentary, 1963
- The Canaanites (Ancient Peoples & Places), 1964
- The Krt Text in the Literature of Ras Shamra: A Social Myth of Ancient Canaan, 1964
- Near Eastern Mythology : Mesopotamia, Syria, Palestine, 1969
- A History of Jerusalem, 1969
- The Biblical Doctrine of the Reign of God, 1979
- Joshua, Judges, Ruth, The New Century Bible Commentary, 1986
- The Book of Job, (editor David J.A. Cline), posthumously 2010
