= USS John P. Gray =

United States Navy high-speed transport

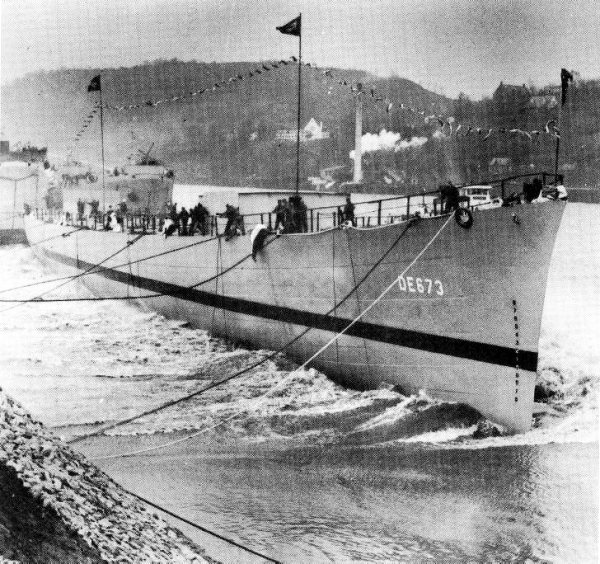
- Destroyer escort USS John P. Gray (DE-673) is launched by the Dravo Corporation at Pittsburgh, Pennsylvania, on 18 March 1944. She was completed as high-speed transport John P. Gray (APD-74).

History

United States
- Name: USS John P. Gray
- Namesake: Lieutenant, junior grade, John P. Gray (1914-1942), U.S. Navy officer and Navy Cross recipient
- Builder: Dravo Corporation, Pittsburgh, Pennsylvania; Consolidated Steel Corporation, Orange, Texas
- Laid down: 18 December 1943
- Launched: 18 March 1944
- Sponsored by: Mrs. Roy C. Gray
- Commissioned: 15 March 1945
- Decommissioned: 29 April 1946
- Reclassified: From destroyer escort (DE-673) to high-speed transport (APD-74) 27 June 1944
- Stricken: 1 March 1967
- Fate: Sold for scrapping 3 September 1968
- Notes: Laid down as Buckley-class destroyer escort USS John P. Gray (DE-673)

General characteristics
- Class & type: Charles Lawrence-class high-speed transport
- Displacement: 1,400 long tons (1,422 t)
- Length: 306 ft (93 m) overall
- Beam: 36 ft 10 in (11.23 m)
- Draft: 13 ft 6 in (4.11 m) maximum
- Installed power: 12,000 shaft horsepower (16 megawatts)
- Propulsion: Two boilers; two GE steam turbines (turbo-electric transmission)
- Speed: 24 knots (44 km/h; 28 mph)
- Range: 6,000 nautical miles (11,000 km) at 12 knots (22 km/h; 14 mph)
- Troops: 162
- Complement: 186
- Armament: 1 × 5 in (130 mm) gun; 6 × 40 mm guns; 6 × 20 mm guns; 2 × depth charge tracks

USS John P. Gray (APD-74), ex-DE-673, was a United States Navy high-speed transport in commission from 1944 to 1946.

The ship's namesake, John Porter Gray, was a torpedo bomber pilot killed during the Battle of Midway in June 1942.

== Construction and commissioning ==
John P. Gray was laid down as the Buckley-class destroyer escort USS John P. Gray (DE-673) on 18 December 1943 by the Dravo Corporation at Pittsburgh, Pennsylvania and launched as such on 18 March 1944, sponsored by Mrs. Roy C. Gray, mother of the ship's namesake, Lieutenant, junior grade, John P. Gray. She then was towed down the Ohio River and the Mississippi River to Orange, Texas, for fitting out at the Consolidated Steel Corporation, Orange, Texas shipyard. The ship was reclassified as a Charles Lawrence-class high-speed transport and redesignated APD-74 on 27 June 1944. After conversion to her new role, the ship was commissioned at the Consolidated yard on 15 March 1945.

== Service history ==
Following a shakedown cruise to Guantanamo Bay, Cuba, during April and May 1945, John P. Gray arrived at New London on 1 June 1945 to escort the Italian submarine Goffredo Mameli to Guantanamo Bay. From there John P. Gray proceeded via the Panama Canal Zone to San Diego, California, arriving 19 June 1945. She departed for Pearl Harbor, Territory of Hawaii, 21 June 1945, and spent July 1945 training underwater demolition teams on the island of Maui. In August 1945 she returned briefly to California to embark an underwater demolition team unit for duty; and, after a stopover in Hawaii, she arrived Eniwetok 30 August 1945. Meanwhile, World War II came to end with the surrender of Japan on 15 August 1945.

The war over, John P. Gray arrived at Jinsen, Korea, on 8 September 1945 to take part in occupation operations. Departing on 14 September 1945, she steamed via Guam and Eniwetok to Pearl Harbor, and was attached to Operation Magic Carpet, the giant operation undertaken to return to the United States the thousands of Pacific war veterans demobilizing after World War II. She made two voyages between Hawaii and San Diego, then departed San Diego on 30 November 1945 for Norfolk, Virginia. John P. Gray arrived at Hampton Roads, Virginia, on 13 December 1945, and then moved to Green Cove Springs, Florida, where she arrived on 25 January 1946.

== Decommissioning and disposal ==
John P. Gray was decommissioned at Green Cove Springs on 29 April 1946 and entered the Texas Group of the Atlantic Reserve Fleet at Orange, Texas. Later she was moved to San Francisco. After nearly 21 years of inactivity, she was stricken from the Navy List on 1 March 1967 and was sold for scrapping on 3 September 1968.
