= John Gray (Episcopalian minister) =

John Gray (23 February 1646 - 24 November 1717) was an Episcopalian minister of the Church of Scotland. In 1689, he 'became a non-juror'. as part of the schism following the Glorious Revolution. Upon his death his 'valuable library' was 'bequeathed to the Town of Haddington' which is now at the National Library of Scotland having been deposited there in 1961.

== Early life ==
John Gray was baptized in Haddington on 24 February 1646. His mother’s brother, John Dyit, and his father’s brother, John Gray, were named along with his parents in the Baptism Register.

John went to Edinburgh University to study Theology. An entry in the Laureation album from 1664 shows what is most likely his signature. He became a minister of the Episcopal Church of Scotland in 1667 when was granted his licence after 'passing his trials before the Presbytery of Haddington.

John’s first parish was in Tulliallan, Fife, and he stayed there for five years before moving to Glasgow, where he took over his new parish in the east end of the city, at St Mungo’s Church. During John's time at St Mungo’s he became an acquaintance of Gilbert Burnet then Chair of Theology at Glasgow. John was deemed to be a great scholar whose 'wonderful library... is the visible embodiment of his portentous learning and his mastery of various languages both ancient and modern.' John married Mary Blair the daughter of Hew Blair, another Episcopal Minister of the Church of Scotland

== Minister of Aberlady & afterwards ==
In the summer of 1684, John became the minister of Aberlady there is an entry in the Glasgow Burgh Records about who was to replace him at St Mungo's.

On 12 September 1689, John Gray was deprived of his position by the order of the Privy Council. This was for not 'reading the Proclamation of the Estates and not praying for their Majesties William III and Mary II.'

John challenged his deprivation in July 1690 'on the grounds that the original petition was given out of spite' he further submitted a claim for '£895 10 Shillings' Scots to be reimbursed for work he had undertaken on his Manse & Church building. The Privy Council ordered 'the heritors and others liable to make payment to Gray and suspended all letters against him until this was done.' Despite this challenge and the temporary stay on his deprivation he was eventually replaced.

After he was 'deprived of his charge', he moved back to his birthplace, Haddington, where he 'occasionally preached in the humble meeting-house' in the Poldrate.

== Death, testament & legacy ==
John died in 1717 and is buried in St Mary Haddington where his grave is marked by a 'flat ornamental stone'.

John's testament gifted his library, of at that point 900 volumes, 'for the use and behoofe of the poor of the Toun' and by so doing he founded the town library.

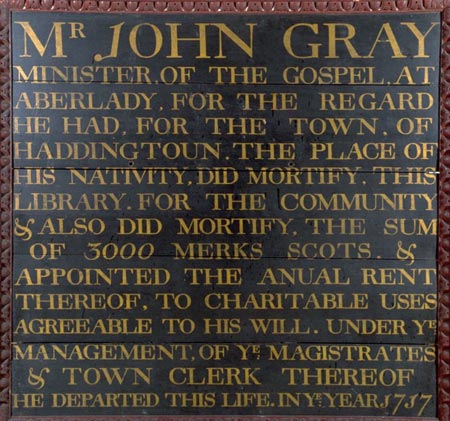
Dedication Board from the Original John Gray Library

In addition to the library, John left a grant of 3,000 merks which was to be used in the following ways:

- 1,000 merks to be spent on training up an apprentice in a trade every two years. Some of this money was to be used on heating the library through the winter though, so that twice a week people could go and use it comfortably.
- 1,000 merks was to be distributed among the poor on his birthday every year (he says in his will that his birthday was the last day in February). And if anyone related to him was amongst the poor, they were to be given ‘a larger share’.
- 500 merks was to pay a librarian to look after the books
- 500 merks was to pay for the repair of the books, to make sure they stayed in good condition, and to buy more once they were all ‘in good Case’.

This gift of his library has led some to refer to him as the 'father of public libraries in East Lothian'.

His library was transferred to the National Library of Scotland, where it is now accessible to the public. His Library now comprises over 1,500 volumes, as more were acquired in line with his wishes, and is 'perhaps the finest collection of early printed books in Scotland.' with a 'varied assortment of specimens of early printing and binding'. Within this collection is a book previously owned by John Donne and the collection itself has already been the subject of scholarly research.

Within Haddington, a new Heritage Centre and library were named after him which opened in 2012. As part of the development of the project a school-based animation project was run in the county with 180 pupils participating the a summary of this output has been shared here on YouTube. The individual films are also available on the same channel and were discussed at the time on some of the School blogs.
