= Jack Gray (footballer, born 1916) =

Australian rules footballer, born 1916

Personal information
- Full name: Jack Gray
- Born: 5 May 1916
- Died: 15 September 2008 (aged 92)
- Original team: Yarraville
- Height: 178 cm (5 ft 10 in)
- Weight: 76 kg (168 lb)

Playing career^{1}
Years	Club	Games (Goals)
1942–43	Footscray	11 (0)
- ^{1} Playing statistics correct to the end of 1943.

Jack Gray (5 May 1916 – 15 September 2008) was a former Australian rules footballer who played with Footscray in the Victorian Football League (VFL).
