= Jonathan Gray =

Jonathan Gray may refer to:

== Sports ==
- Jonathan Gray (cricketer) (born 1967), English cricketer
- Johnathan Gray (born 1993), American football player
- Jonathan Grey (born 1992), Filipino basketball player
- Jon Gray (born 1991), American baseball player

== Others ==
- Herbert Adams (novelist) (1874–1958), used the pseudonym Jonathan Gray
- Jonathan "Spike" Gray (born 1968), English rock frontman, songwriter and vocalist
- Jonathan Gray (editor), English editor
- Jonathan D. Gray (born 1970), chief operating officer of Blackstone Group
- Jonathan Gray (producer) (born 1980), French-American film producer

== See also ==
- John Gray (disambiguation)
- Johnny Gray (disambiguation)
- John Grey (disambiguation)
