= Johnny Grey =

British architect (born 1951)

Johnny Grey (born 1951) is a British interior designer, author and educator, known for his work in kitchen design.

== Early life and education ==
Grey studied architecture at the Architectural Association from 1970 to 1976 (AA Dip Arch), with tutors Jeremy Dixon and Mike Gold. One of the first kitchens he designed was for the food writer Elizabeth David, his aunt.

== Career ==
=== Early kitchen design ===
Whilst studying architecture, Grey focused on craft aspects of historic buildings. He also dealt in and restored 18th-century furniture alongside his brother. After graduating, he made furniture and kitchens in his family's barn in Sussex. His career took off after the publication of a Sunday Times article in 1980, titled "Why this Awful Fixation with Fitted Kitchens?".

=== Johnny Grey Studios ===
Grey ran a showroom and studio at the San Francisco Design Center from 1990 to 1997. Over thirty projects by Johnny Grey Studios have been installed across the country, including showcase houses in San Francisco and New York.

With a focus now on socially aware design projects for corporate and charitable organizations, Grey is currently working with the 4G Kitchen Consortium and the National Innovation Center for Ageing (NICA) and Newcastle University.

=== Design innovations ===
In the late 1970s Grey adapted the end-grain butchers’ block for domestic use, incorporating it into a piece of furniture, often with a drawer or two. He launched the Unfitted Kitchen concept in 1984. Made from freestanding furniture, this was an unorthodox idea for its time. The now-widespread use of willow baskets as drawers has been attributed to Grey's Unfitted Kitchen concept. Willow baskets in cabinetry were registered for copyright by Grey jointly with Smallbone in 1987, though Mark Wilkinson objected that basketry can be traced to historical African applications.

Grey includes a central island in his designs wherever possible.

Grey incorporated Alexander Technique theory in kitchen design, with individually customized dimensions for counter tops and sink and dishwasher placement. Dedicated work surfaces, or task-driven areas, further this approach. Low-level counters for smaller appliances (and children's cooking) and raised-height dishwashers are now widespread in kitchens.

'Soft Geometry' describes Grey's move towards curved furniture inspired by the relationship between peripheral vision and body movement. In the mid 2000s, his meeting with neuroscientist and sociologist John Zeisel focused on making kitchens into 'happy spaces'. 'The living room in which you cook' (2014) restricts the culinary zone to leave room for other sociable activities. Eye contact as key to design was another neuroscience-inspired idea, alongside the identification of each kitchen's 'sweet spot' as the location for a key piece of furniture such as the central island.

== Author ==
Grey's first book The Art of Kitchen Design, published in 1994, includes the social history of the kitchen. In 1997 Cassell published The Hardworking House, a collection of essays on the history of home design. In 1997 The Kitchen Workbook was also published in a series of home design books for Dorling Kindersley, later incorporated into DK’s The Complete Home Design Workbook (1998). Grey's Kitchen Culture was published in 2004 with English, American, Russian and Asian editions.

== Education and teaching ==
In 2012 Grey became Visiting Professor of Design and Kitchen Culture at Buckinghamshire New University. He resigned from the university in October 2020.

In 2017, Grey collaborated with Sevra Davis, director of education at the Royal Society of Arts, and Professor Peter Gore and Patrick Bonnet from the National Innovation Center for Ageing in Newcastle, to extend accessible design education into kitchen design and assist with changing the language of disability and ageing design to focus on multi-generational design. They developed the Student Design Challenge: Eat, Share, Live.

== Awards ==
In September 2021, Grey was awarded a Special Achievement Award at the Kbbreview Retail & Design Awards.
