= Skid Hill =

Hill in Scotland

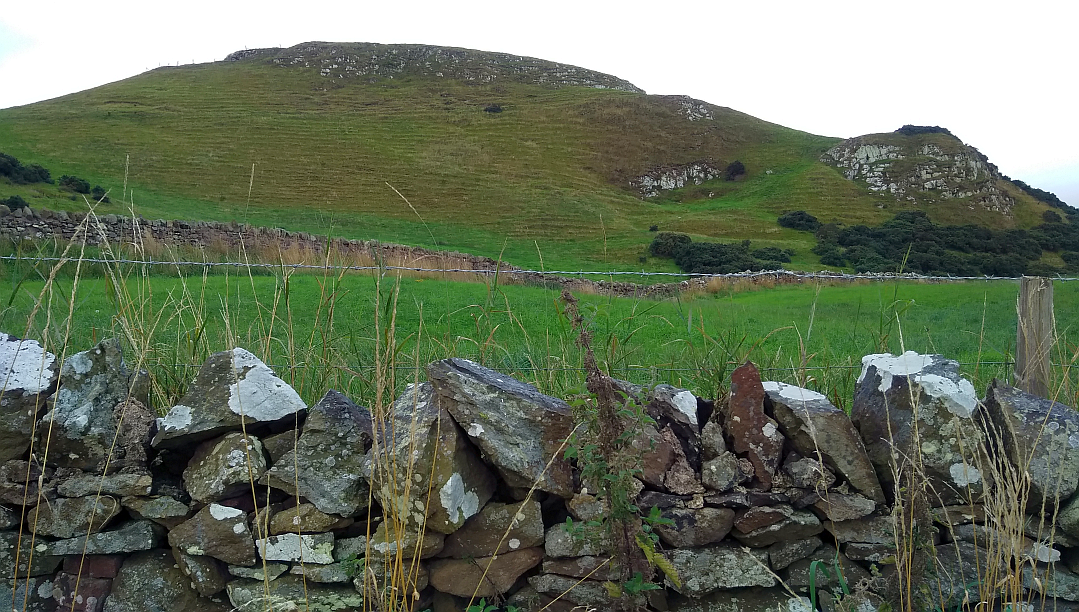
- Skid Hill seen from NW

Highest point
- Elevation: 186 m (610 ft)
- Prominence: 98 m (322 ft)
- Listing: TuMP
- Coordinates: 55°58′42″N 2°47′30″W

Geography
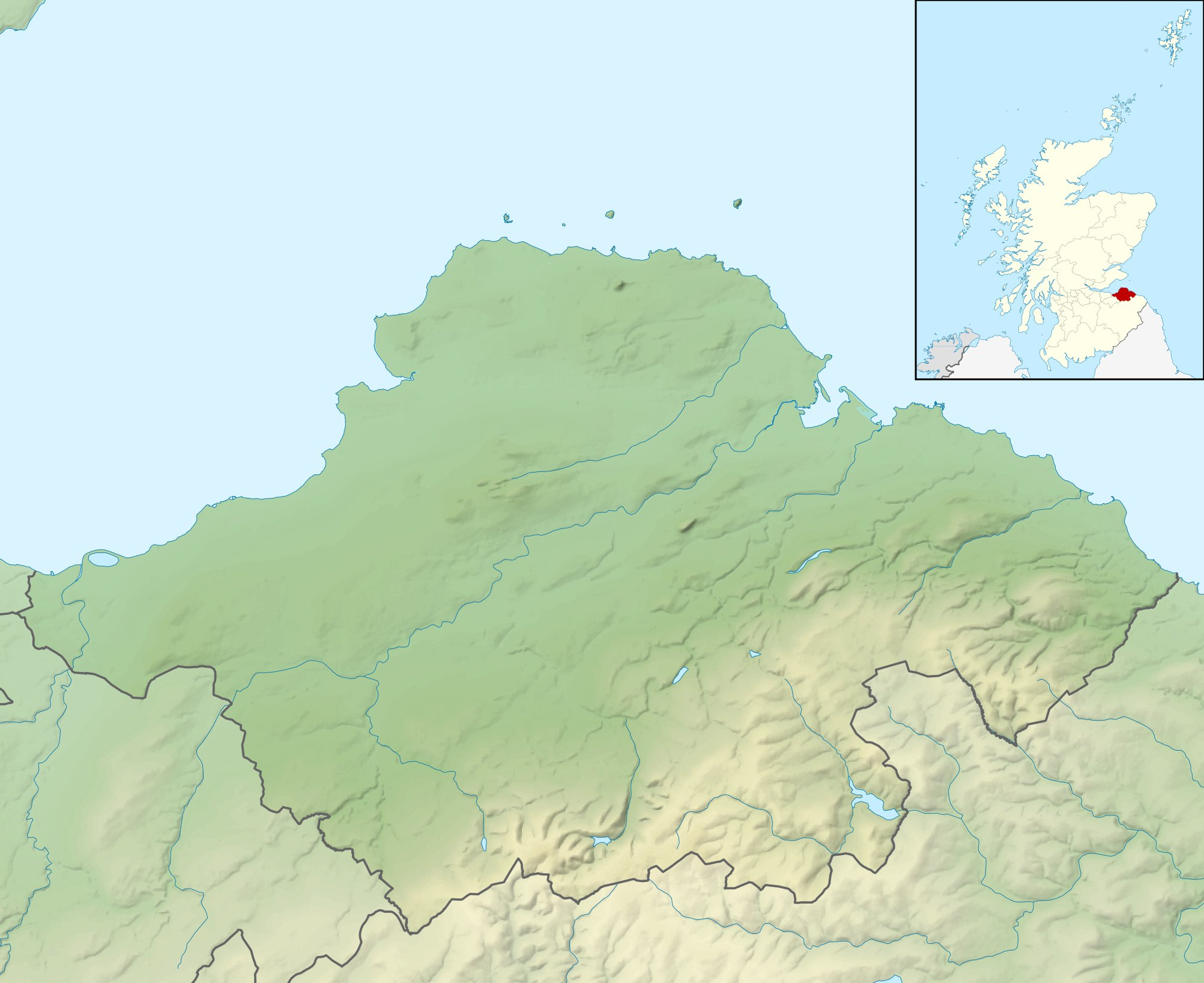
- Location within East Lothian
- Location: East Lothian, Scotland, United Kingdom
- Parent range: Garleton Hills
- OS grid: NT 50730 76437

Climbing
- Easiest route: Hike

Skid Hill is a 186 metres high hill of eastern Scotland, the highest of the Garleton Hills.

== Geology ==
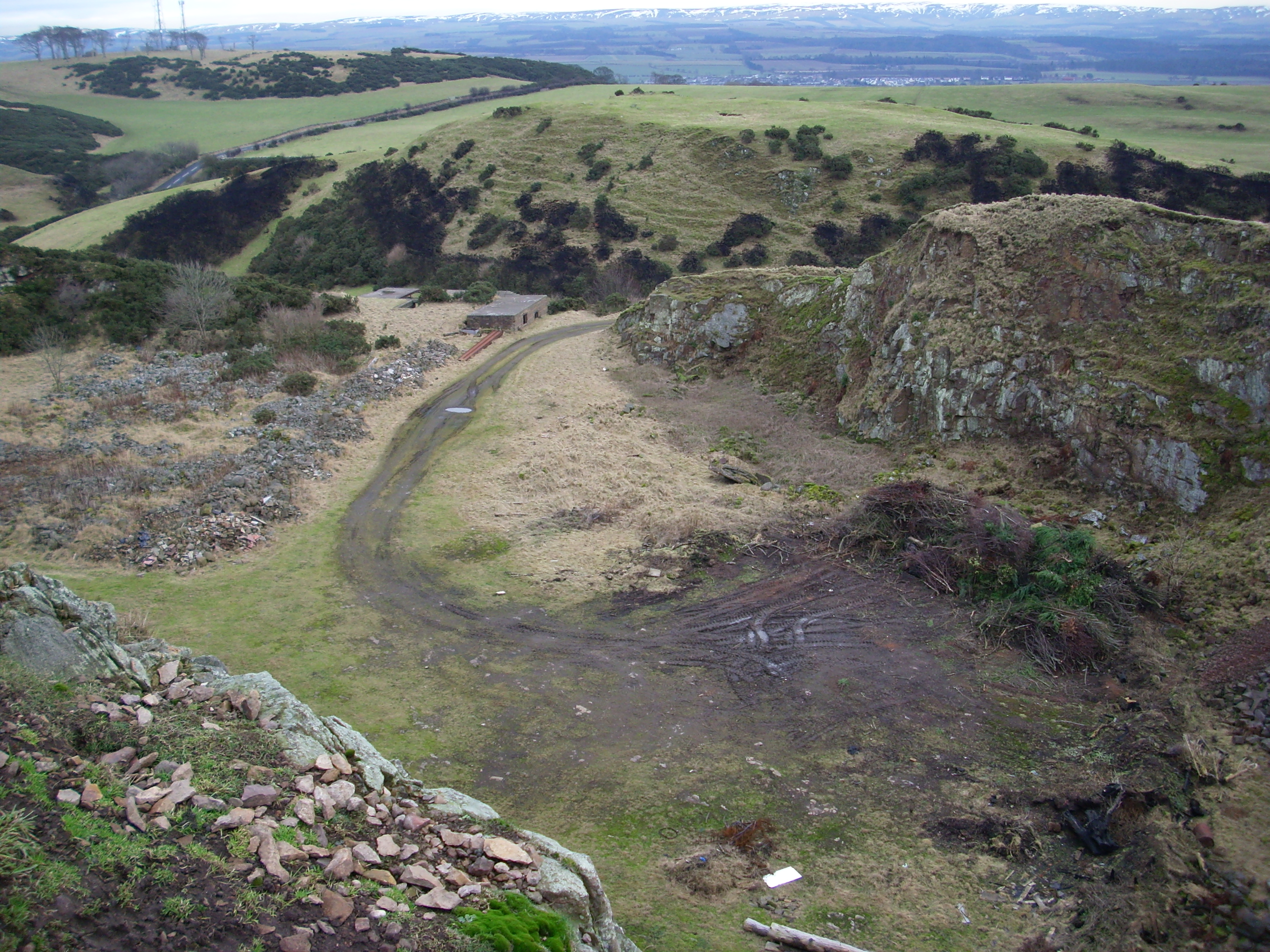
The old quarry

The hill origin is volcanic and it shows both trachitic and basic lavas, recognisable thanks to the excavations connected to the disused quarry opened in its eastern flanks.

== History ==
A hill fort was detected close to the top of Skid Hill, in one area now located on the northern edge of the disused quarry.

== Access to the summit ==
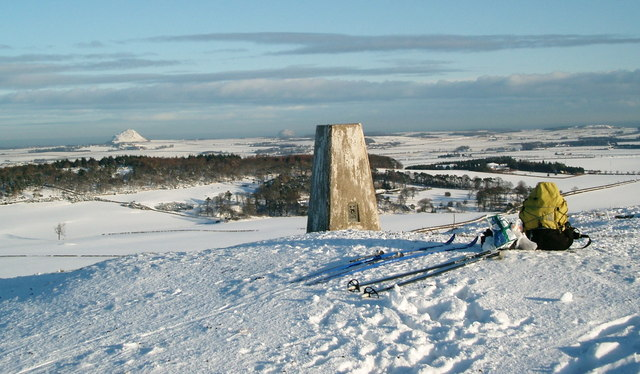
Skid Hill trig point in winter

Very close to the actual summit of Skid Hill stands a trig point. It can be easily accessed on foot from a road flanking the hill by a good track running along the South side of the hill and then by cattle tracks on its western side.

== See also ==
- List of mountains in Scotland
- List of places in East Lothian
