= Haddington =

Town in East Lothian, Scotland

Coordinates: 55°57′20″N 2°46′51″W

Haddington: Scottish Gaelic: Baile Adainn; Scots: Haidintoun
- Market town and administrative centre
- St Mary's Church Lennoxlove House St Martin's Church Hailes Castle Nungate Bridge

- Coat of Arms

- Location within East Lothian
- Population: 11,354 (2022)
- OS grid reference: NT511739
  - Edinburgh: 17 mi (27 km)
  - London: 393 mi (632 km)
- Council area: East Lothian
- Lieutenancy area: East Lothian
- Country: Scotland
- Sovereign state: United Kingdom
- Post town: HADDINGTON
- Postcode district: EH41
- Dialling code: 01620
- Police: Scotland
- Fire: Scottish
- Ambulance: Scottish
- UK Parliament: East Lothian
- Scottish Parliament: East Lothian

Haddington (Scots: Haidintoun, Scottish Gaelic: Baile Adainn) is a historic market town in East Lothian, Scotland. It lies about 17 miles (27 kilometres) east of Edinburgh. The name Haddington is Anglo-Saxon, dating from the sixth or seventh century AD when the area was incorporated into the Kingdom of Bernicia. The town, like the rest of the Lothian region, was ceded by Edgar, King of England and became part of Scotland in the tenth century. During the reign of David I (1124–1153) Haddington received burgh status, becoming the Royal Burgh of Haddington; one of the earliest settlements to receive the status. This endowed Haddington with trading rights which encouraged its growth into a market town.

During the High Middle Ages, it was the fourth-biggest town in Scotland (after Aberdeen, Roxburgh and Edinburgh). In the centre of the town is the Town House, completed in 1745 based on a plan by William Adam. When first built, it contained markets on the ground floor, and an assembly hall on the first floor to which improvements were made in 1788, and a spire was added in 1831. Other notable buildings include the Corn Exchange (1854) and the County Courthouse (1833). Notable sites of interest include the Jane Welsh Carlyle House; Mitchell's Close; and a building on the High Street that was the birthplace of the author and government reformer Samuel Smiles and is marked by a commemorative plaque. John Knox was probably born in Haddington and Knox Academy, the local high school, is named after him.

Haddington had a population of 11,354 inhabitants in 2022. It is the main administrative, cultural and geographical centre for East Lothian.

== Economy ==
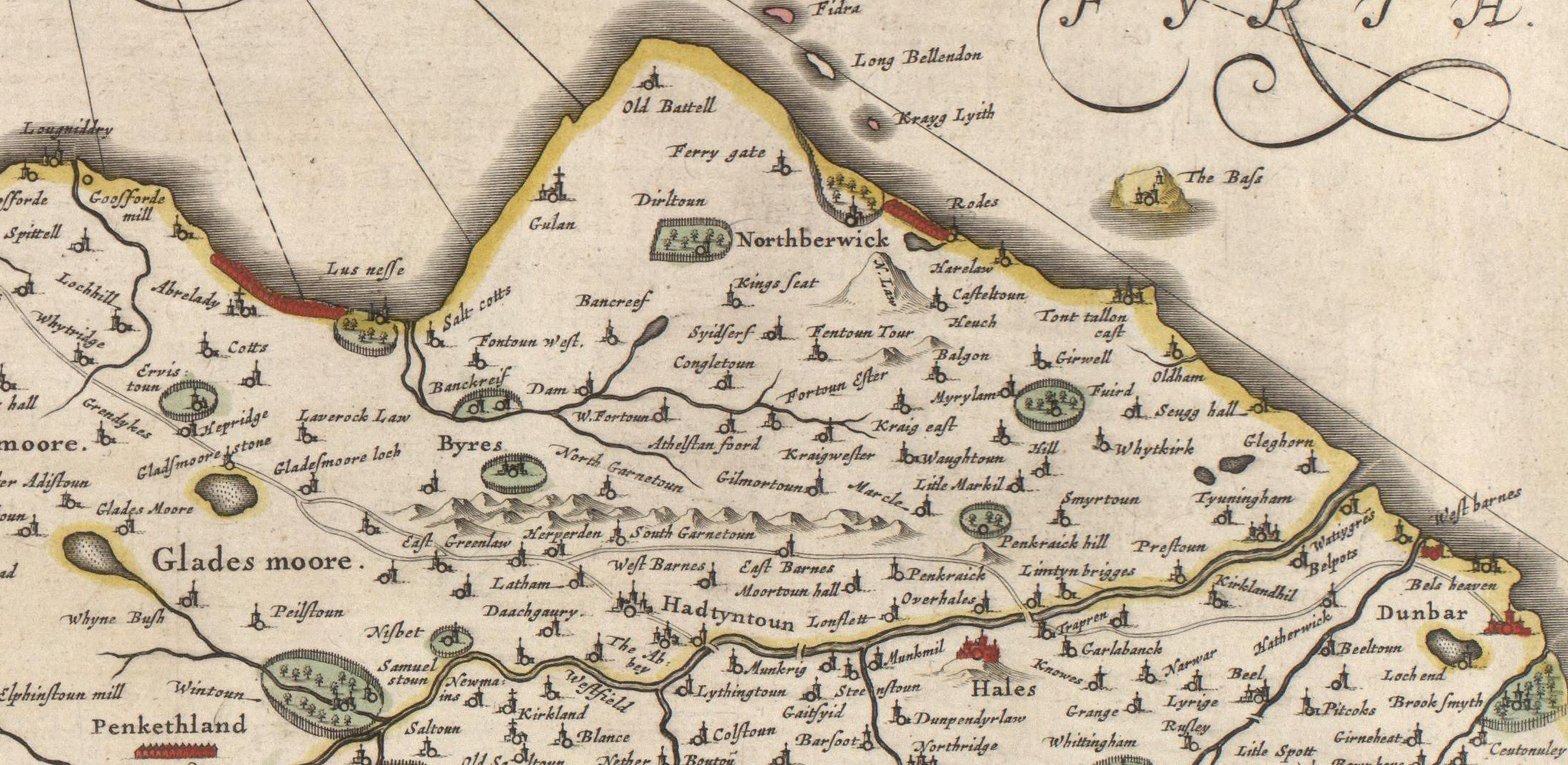
Blaeu's map of 1654 showing the area around Haddington. Other old maps exist made from the time of Timothy Pont onwards.

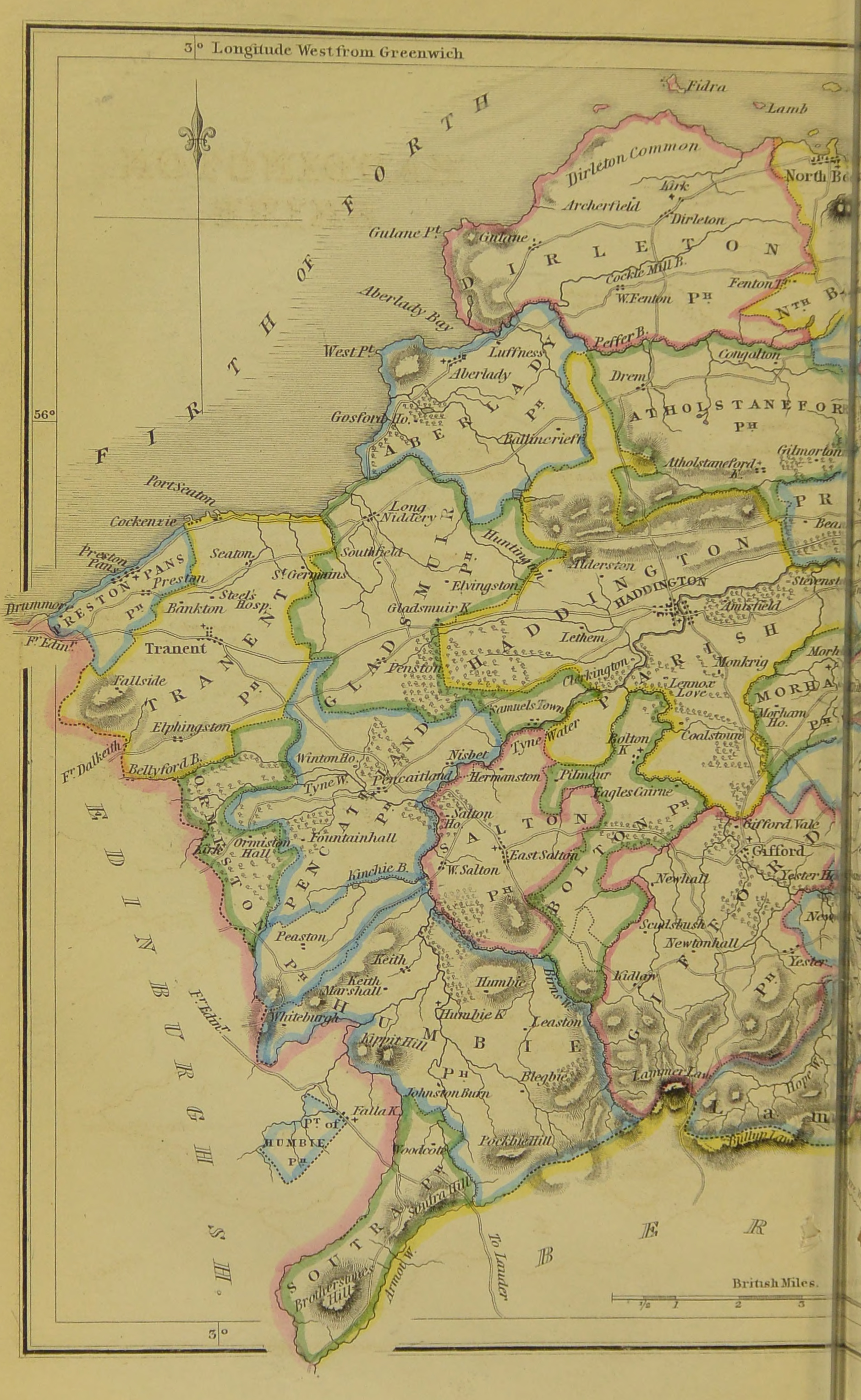
Map of Haddingtonshire by William Home Lizars

Haddington is located predominantly on the left bank of the River Tyne, and was once famous for its mills. It developed into the fourth-largest town in Scotland during the High Middle Ages, and later was at the centre of the mid-eighteenth century Scottish Agricultural Revolution.

In 1641, an Act was passed by the Parliament of Scotland to encourage the production of fine cloth, and in 1645 an amendment went through stating that the masters and workers of manufactories would be exempt from military service. As a result of this, more factories were established; these included the New Mills. This factory suffered during the Civil War with the loss of its cloth to General Monck. A new charter was drawn up in May 1681, and major capital invested in new machinery, but the New Mills had mixed fortunes, inevitably affected by the lack of protectionism for Scottish manufactured cloth. The Scots Courant reported in 1712 that New Mills was to be "rouped" (auctioned). The property was sold on 16 February 1713 and the machinery and plant on 20 March. The lands of New Mills were purchased by Colonel Francis Charteris and he changed their name to Amisfield.

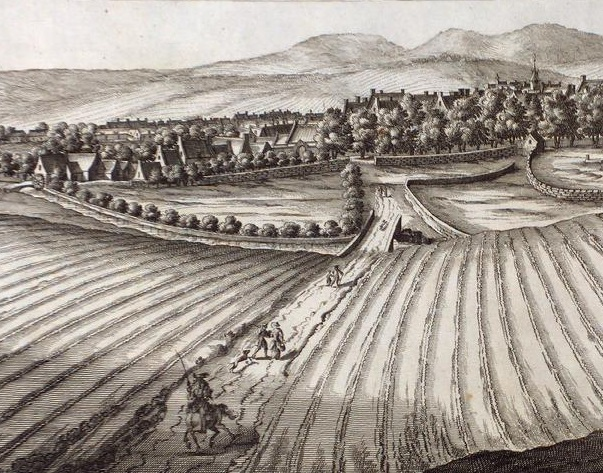
An illustration from the 1690s showing the runrig system in operation in Haddington

As the county town of East Lothian, Haddington is the seat of East Lothian Council with offices located at John Muir House behind Court Street. This building occupies the site of Haddington's twelfth century royal palace and adjoins the former Sheriff Court complex. The town centre is home to a wide range of independent retailers including: a bookshop, a sports shop, a butchers, a hardware shop, cookware shop and several gift shops alongside several pubs, restaurants and cafés. Nationwide retailers with a presence in Haddington include: Tesco, Home Bargains, Boots, Aldi and Co-op Food. Besides retail and administration, the town is also home to various law firms and has industrial capacity in the works beside the Tyne at the Victoria Bridge (PureMalt), and around the site of the old station (Lemac), and various smaller industrial units and garages. Haddington is also home to the offices of the local newspaper the East Lothian Courier. There is a farmers' market held on the last Saturday of the month in Court Street.

== Historic core ==
The town centre largely retains its historic street plan with Court Street, High Street, Market Street and Hardgate defining the edges of the original open triangular medieval market place, divided by a central island of buildings developed from the 16th century onwards on the site of market stalls. To the north and south the medieval rigg pattern of burgage plots can still be observed with narrow buildings fronting the main streets and long plots behind stretching back, originally to the line of the old town walls, accessed by small closes and pends. The historic importance of the town's relatively unaltered medieval plan and significant survival of historic buildings was recognised as early as the 1950s, with Haddington subject to an Improvement Scheme, Scotland's earliest, which saw many period properties rehabilitated by the Town Council (under the leadership of Frank Tindall as Director of Planning) and a pioneering town colour scheme developed, resulting in the distinctive and colourful townscape seen today.

Some comprehensive redevelopment did occur, chiefly around Newton Port and Hardgate to allow for widening of these narrow streets to improve motor traffic flow. This included the demolition of Bothwell Castle and its dovecote in 1955, the land now forming part of Hardgate Park. Today the whole town centre is a conservation area with a high proportion of listed buildings, some dating back to the C16th, and the redevelopment and infill schemes undertaken since the 1950s have largely been in a sympathetic vernacular style which has maintained the town's historic character.

== Notable landmarks ==
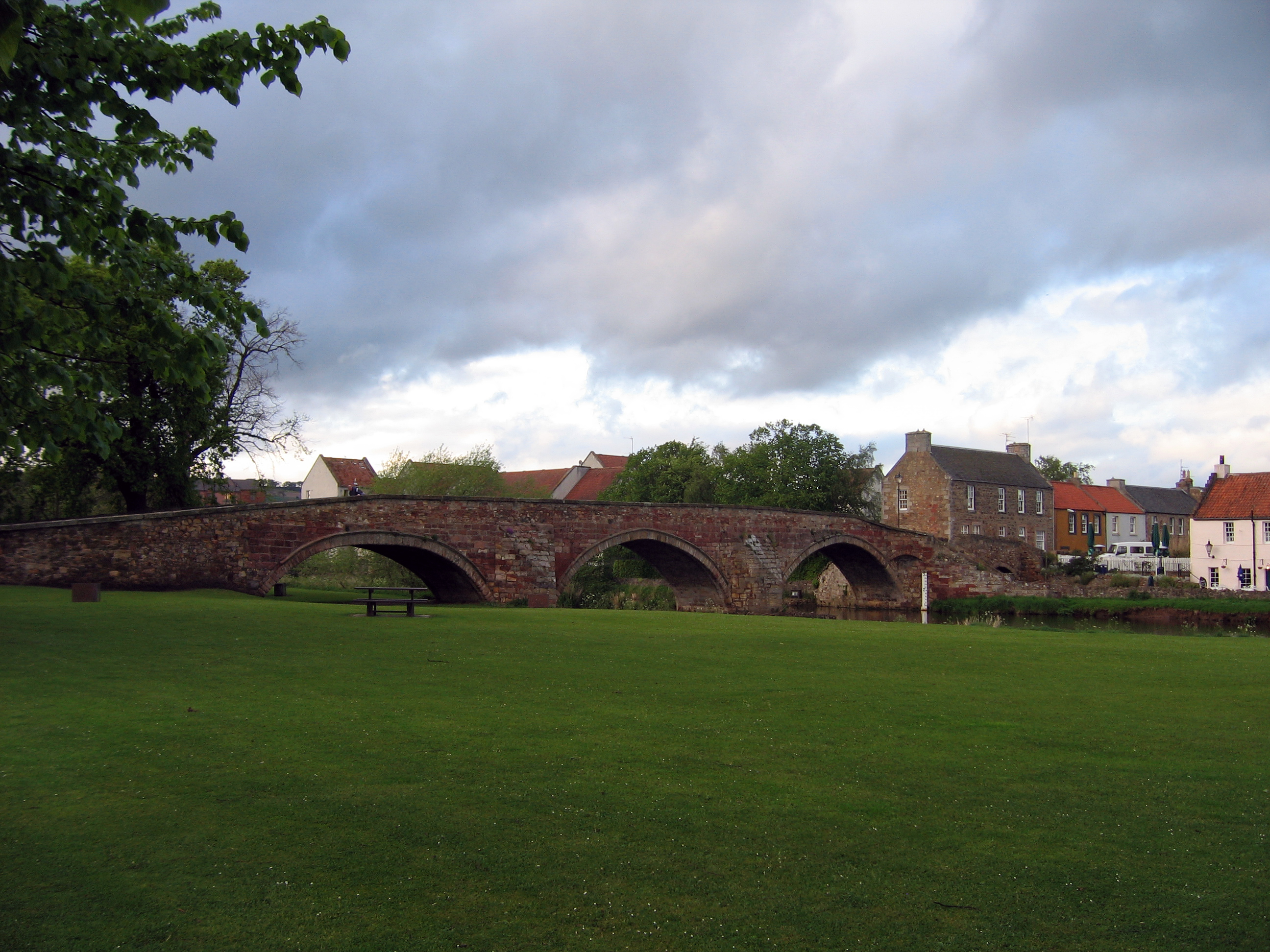
Nungate Bridge, Haddington

The town has a number of notable buildings but the Abbey of St Mary and 16th Century town defences have left little to see on the ground. They are being researched by Haddington's History Society. St Martin's Kirk also remains one of the towns oldest and most prominent buildings.

=== Amisfield House ===
Amisfield House was located east of Haddington, south of the River Tyne. Designed by architect Isaac Ware and built of Garvald red freestone for Colonel Francis Charteris, it was described in The Buildings of Scotland as "the most important building of the orthodox Palladian school in Scotland." John Henderson built the walled garden in 1783, and the castellated stable block in 1785. The park in front of the house, possibly landscaped by James Bowie, is today entirely ploughed. A victim of dry rot, the house was demolished in 1928.

All that remains of Amisfield today are the summer house, walled garden, ice house, chapel, and gates.

The world's earliest surviving records of a lodge of free gardeners come from Haddington, in 1676.

=== Lennoxlove House ===
Lennoxlove House, a historic thirteenth-century house and estate, lies 1/2 mile (800 metres) south of Haddington. Built by the Giffards of Yester, it was originally named Lethington. It was once home to the Maitland family, notably Sir Richard Maitland, and his son William Maitland of Lethington, Secretary of State to Mary, Queen of Scots'. The Maitlands left Lennoxlove in the seventeenth century, and it is now the seat of the Duke of Hamilton and Brandon.

=== St Mary's Collegiate Church ===
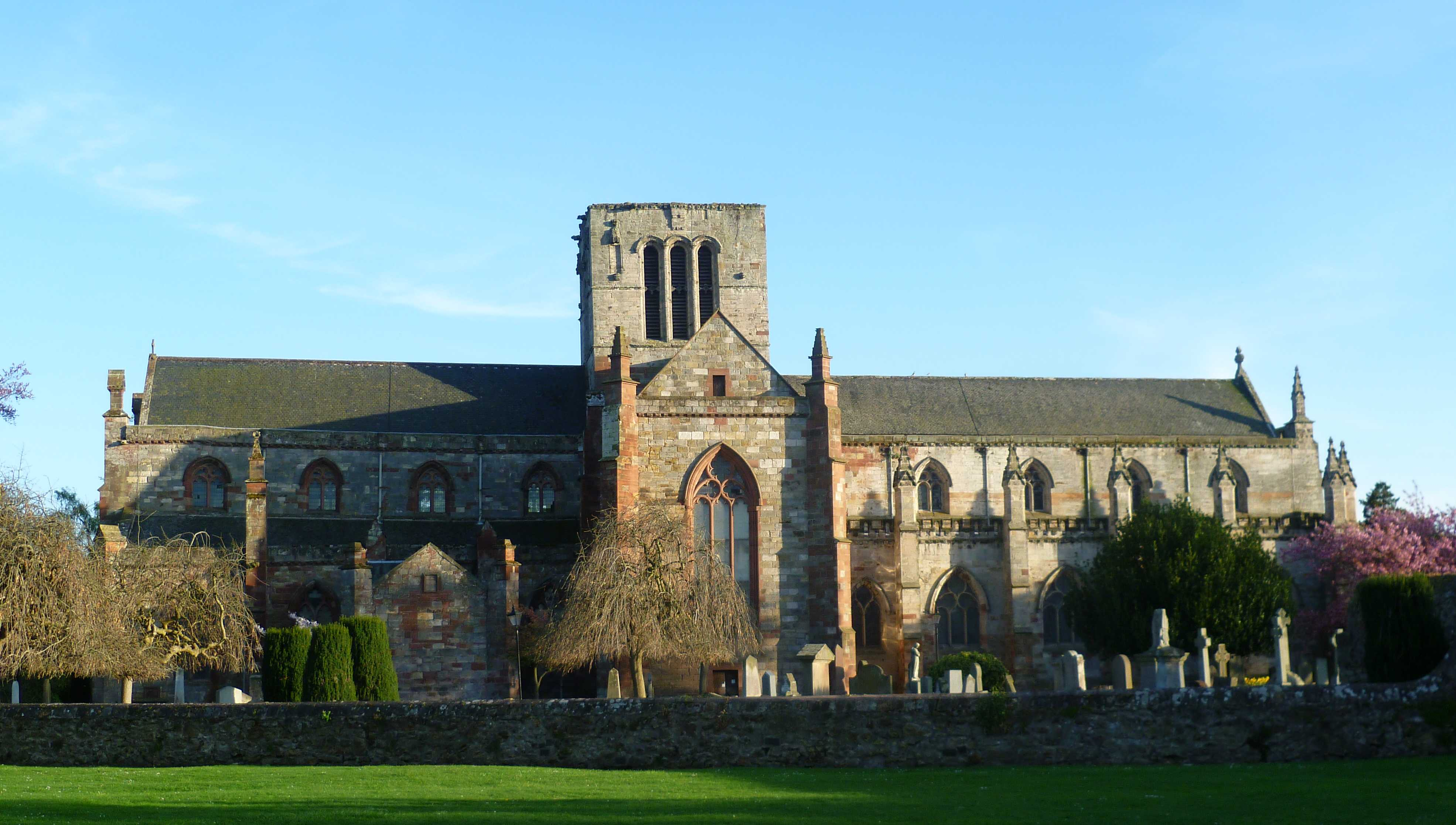
St Mary's Collegiate Church, Haddington

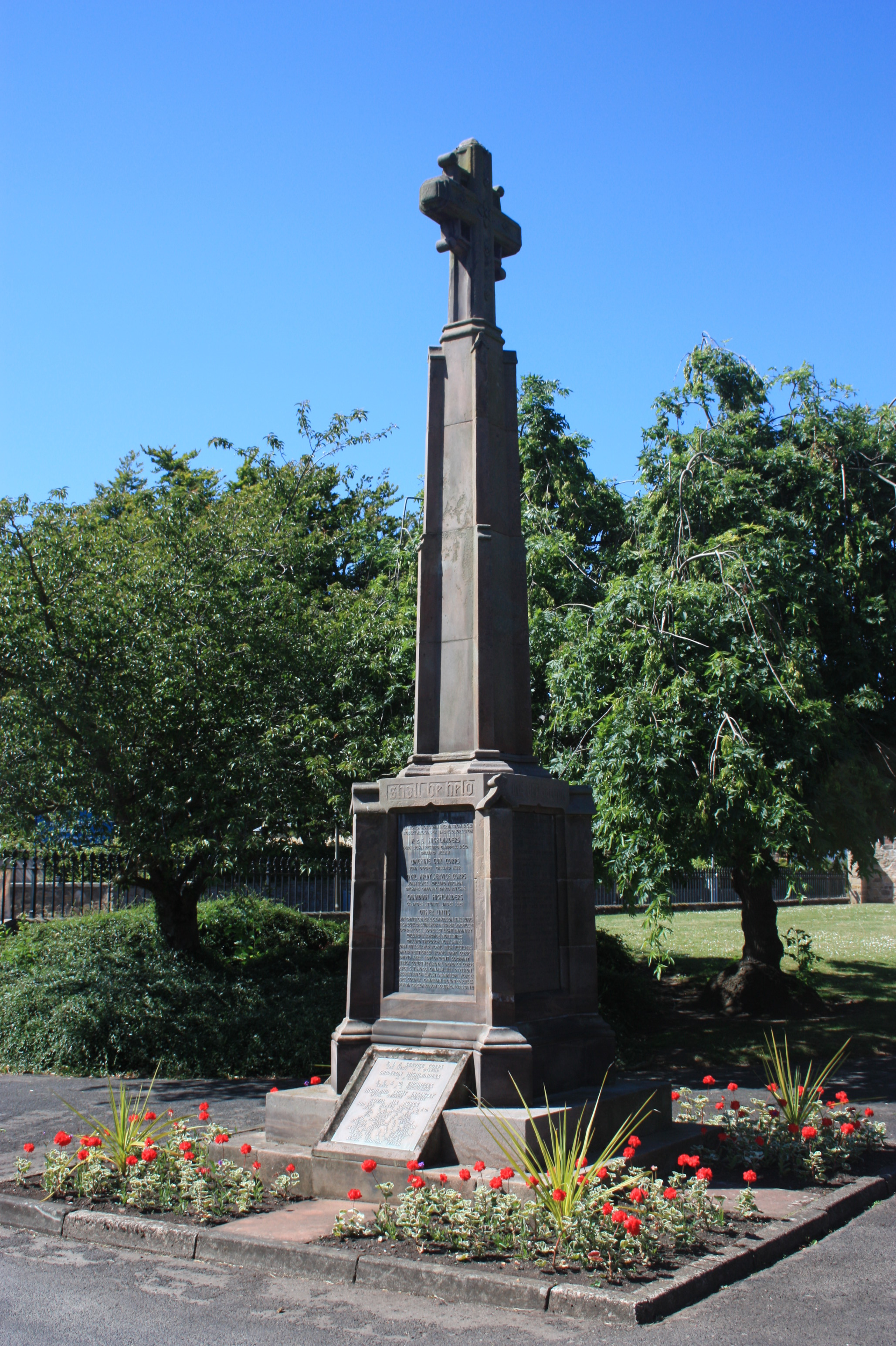
Haddington War Memorial by Pilkington Jackson

The Parish Church of St Mary's is today part of the Church of Scotland, but includes an Episcopalian chapel, the Lauderdale Aisle, containing the mausoleum of the Maitland Earls of Lauderdale. It is the longest parish church in Scotland and is in regular use for worship and musical events. It is directly adjacent to the River Tyne, beside the twelfth century Nungate Bridge.

The present building (built with red sandstone from nearby Garvald) was started in 1375 (an earlier St Mary's Church having been destroyed by the English in 1356), and consecrated in 1410, despite building work not being finished until 1487. The church was partially destroyed during the 1548-49 Siege of Haddington that followed the Rough Wooing of Henry VIII, and on the advice of John Knox, it was restored "frae the tower to the West door". Thus the nave became the church and the choir and transepts were left ruined until the whole church was restored in the 1970s. The Lammermuir pipe organ was built in 1990.

A set of eight bells hung for full change ringing was installed for the Millennium.

Haddington War Memorial stands at the west entrance to the churchyard.

=== Hailes Castle ===
Hailes Castle is a mainly fourteenth-century castle about 5 miles (8 kilometres) east of Haddington. This castle, which has a fine riverside setting, belonged to the Hepburn family during the most important centuries of its existence. Since 1926, it has been the subject of a state-sponsored guardianship agreement, which is now under the auspices of Historic Scotland. It is open to the public without charge at all reasonable times.

== Sport and leisure ==
Haddington is home to East Lothian Amateur Boxing Club, the East of Scotland football club Haddington Athletic, Haddington cricket club who are in east of Scotland division 3 and Haddington RFC, currently playing in Scotland Premiership division 3.

At the end of March 2012, the town's library relocated to the John Gray Centre in Lodge Street, an extensively reconstructed and restored complex of historic buildings including the town's former granary. In addition to the lending library the Centre comprises East Lothian Council's Historical Archives, Local History Collections and Reading Room, a new museum of East Lothian (with a temporary exhibition gallery), a computer suite and community room. The Centre is named after a local minister whose bequest of books and money in 1717 gave the town one of the earliest community libraries in Scotland.

== Transport ==
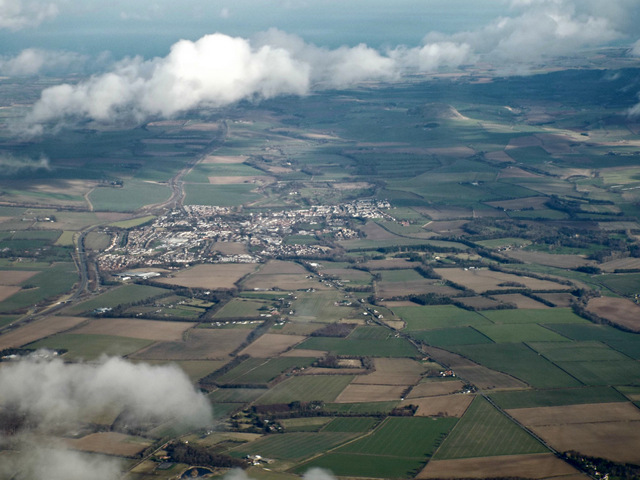
Haddington from the air

Haddington sits approximately half a mile to the south of the A1 dual carriageway linking Edinburgh to London. The town is currently served by the bus operators Borders Buses, Prentice Coaches, Eve Coaches and East Coast Buses. These buses facilitate travel to Edinburgh, Berwick-upon-Tweed, and Haddington overall serves as a major transport hub to several other towns and villages in East Lothian. Since the withdrawal of many First Scotland East services in June 2012, the contracts for the 121 Haddington to North Berwick and the 123 Gifford Circle passed back to the Dunbar-based firm Eve Coaches. These services are now provided by East Coast Buses. The nearest railway station is at Drem, four miles (six kilometres) to the north, which is served by regular trains from Edinburgh to North Berwick. Haddington was once served by its own railway line which carried passengers for just over a century from 1846-1949. There have been numerous proposals to reopen or extend a railway line to Haddington to ease road congestion; but nothing has come to fruition in regards to this.

=== The Railway ===
The Haddington railway line was a branch from the East Coast Main Line at Longniddry and terminated at Haddington railway station and freight depot in the area between West Road and Hospital Road. The line was 4 13/16 miles (7.7 kilometres) in length and had stations at Coatyburn Siding and Laverocklaw Siding before terminating in Haddington. The line was opened on 22 June 1846. The branch had only a single track, though bridges and embankments were built to allow for a double track. Passengers from Haddington were required to alight at Longniddry and change trains in order to travel to Edinburgh.

The Haddington branch line and station were damaged during the flood of 1948 and though both passenger and freight services were reinstated, British Rail opted to remove rail services to the public due to competition from bus services and dwindling passenger numbers. Passenger services ended for good on 29 December 1949. The use of the railway line for freight continued until March 1968. The larger Victorian station building was demolished; a smaller older building, parts of the platform structure, and embankment walls remain. These are recognisable by their distinctive red-brick appearance, and can be seen from West Road, Somnerfield Court, and the industrial area south of Hospital Road.

The land occupied by Haddington's railway line is owned by East Lothian Council and is used by walkers, cyclists and equestrians in the section of the line between Longniddry station and the St. Lawrence area of Haddington. The eastern terminus of the line is occupied by industrial units and scrub vegetation. A campaign to reopen Haddington's railway service is led by the group RAGES (Rail Action Group East of Scotland). Since the closure of the station in 1949 (isolated as it then was at the western extremity of Haddington), the town has since expanded significantly. Between 1951-81, the population of the town grew by 54%. It remains to be seen whether further expansion of the town since 1981 will lead to a reinstatement of Haddington's railway line, since there are congestion issues on both the East Coast Main Line and at Edinburgh Waverley railway station.

== History ==
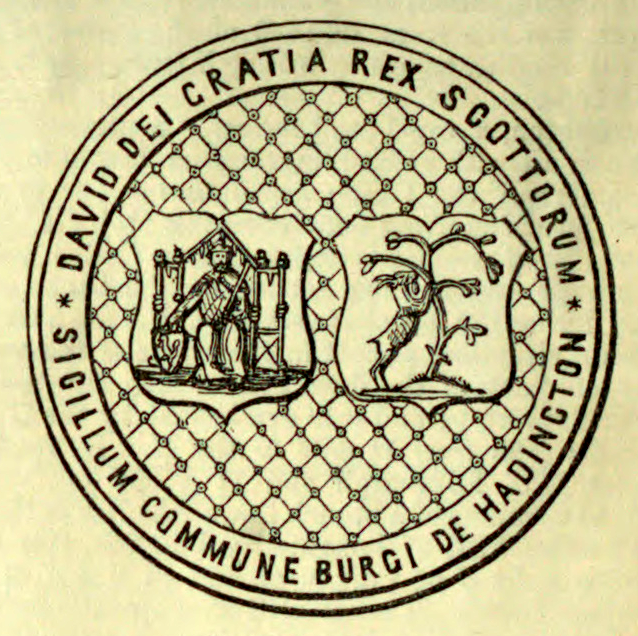
Seal of Haddington town: "David Dei Gratia Rex Scottorum. Sigillum commune burgi de Hadington"

An account of the parish of Haddington was drawn up by the Rev. Dr. Barclay, and published by the Society of Scottish Antiquaries in 1785. James Miller published Lamp of Lothian a history of Haddington in 1844. A new edition was reprinted in 1900 under the name Lamp of Lothian: or, the history of Haddington, in connection with the Public Affairs of East Lothian and of Scotland, from the earliest records to 1844. A goat appears on the seal and on the coat of arms of Haddington. John Martine wrote Reminiscences of the royal burgh of Haddington and old East Lothian agriculturists in 1883.

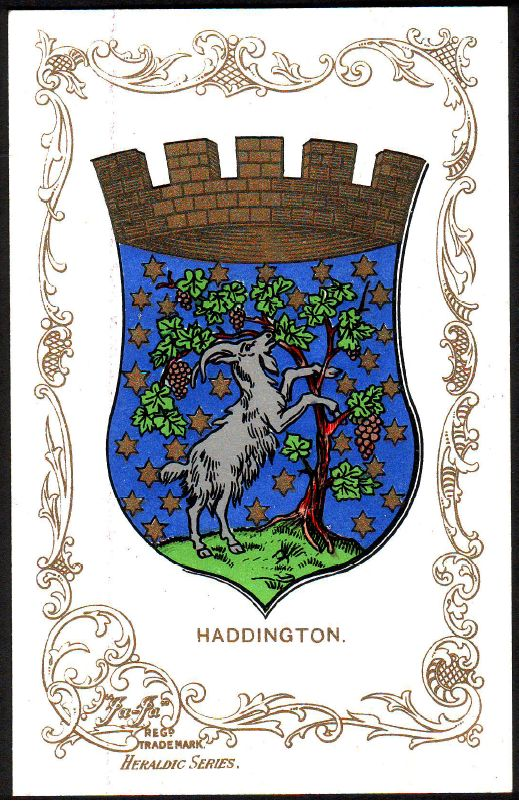
Haddington's Coat of Arms

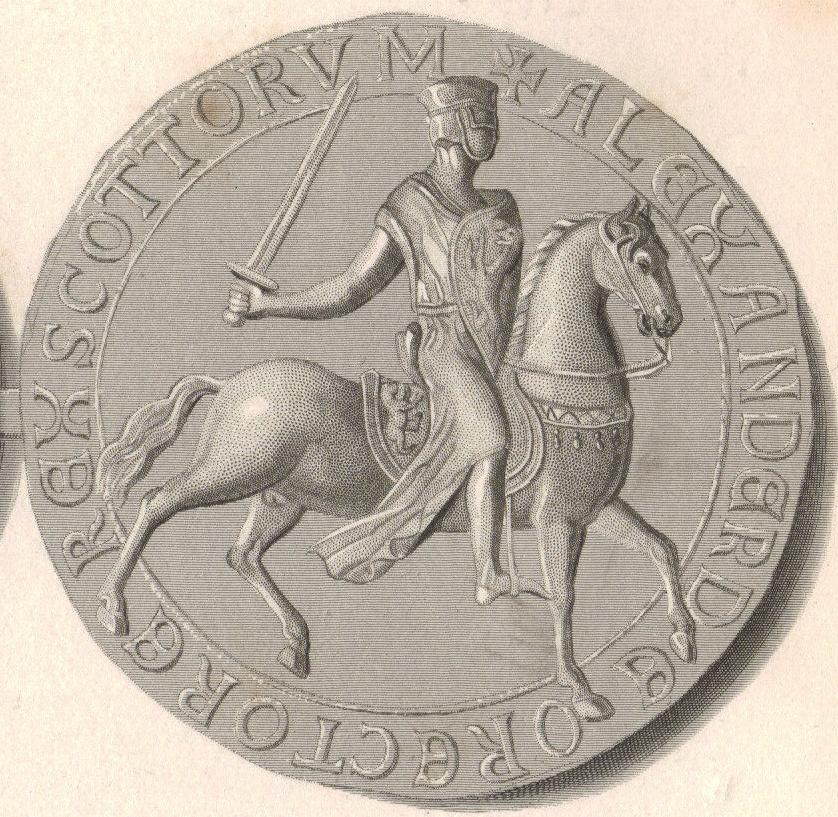
Seal of Alexander II

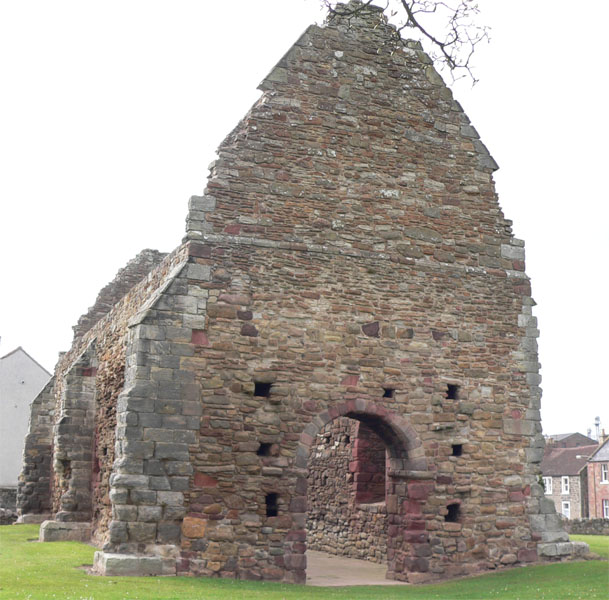
St Martin's Kirk

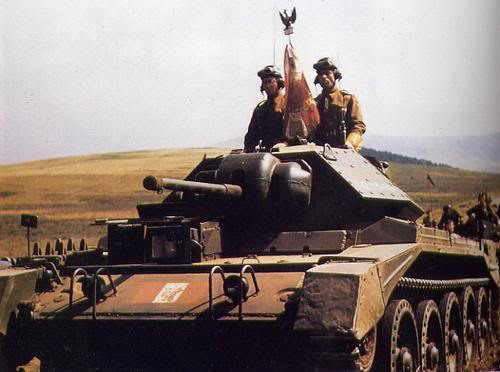
Polish 1st Armoured Division stationed at Haddington in 1943, in preparation for D-Day

- Before 1139 - Haddington granted burgh charters, transferred to Ada de Warenne, as a marriage portion, by her father-in-law David I in that year.
- 1178 – Cistercian abbey of St Mary founded by Countess Ada. St Martin's Kirk in the Nungate built around or before this year; the oldest standing building in Haddington today.
- 1198 – King Alexander II of Scotland is born in Haddington.
- 1216 – Haddington is burnt by the English under King John. Scottish royal family vacate the Palace of Haddington.
- 1242 - Murder of Padraig, Earl of Atholl following a tournament in the town, by members of Clan Bissett.
- 1244 – Haddington is burnt again. Barclay relates that on "the same night in which Haddington was burned, Stirling, Roxburgh, Lanark, Perth, Forfar, Montrose, and Aberdeen, all underwent the same fate."
- 1282 – First mention of a bridge spanning the Tyne.
- 1297 - Haddington burnt by the retreating Scots army.
- 1356 - The town is sacked by the army of Edward III of England. It is now known as the burnt Candlemas.
- 1358 – Flood reportedly washes away the Nungate.
- 1375 – Work begins on rebuilding St Mary's – in Garvald red sandstone.
- 1429 – King's Wall surrounding town is mentioned. Implies early if not continuous fortification of the town.
- 1462 – Work on the building of St Mary's Church is completed.
- 1545 – Plague comes to Haddington in April.
- 1548-49 – Siege of Haddington. The town was occupied by English forces as a part of the Rough Wooing and then besieged by Scottish and French troops.
- 1548 – 7 July – Signing of the Treaty of Haddington. This was a treaty made during the English occupation of the town. The Scottish Parliament convened in the Abbey and agreed to transport Mary, Queen of Scots to France for her marriage to the Dauphin of France.
- 1598 - Haddington burnt again. This time by a careless maidservant drying clothes overnight by a fire.
- 1676 – The 'Ancient Fraternity of Gardeners of East Lothian' is established – the oldest such fraternity known.
- 1688 – John Gray founds a town library.
- 1748 – Haddington Town House is built; to a design of William Adam
- 1770 – Holy Trinity Episcopal Church built in Church Street.
- 1775 – 4 October – Tyne reportedly rises seventeen feet above its ordinary level.
- 1817 – Building of the Waterloo Bridge near the Poldrate Mill. The foundation stone was laid on the anniversary of the Battle of Waterloo, hence the naming of the bridge.
- 1830 – Spire added to the tower of Haddington Town Hall.
- 1831 – First outbreak of cholera asphyxia in Scotland recorded at Haddington
- 1846 – 22 June – Haddington's railway station opens to the public.
- 1854 – Building of the Corn Exchange. This is reputedly the second largest Corn Exchange in Scotland, after Edinburgh.
- 1862 – Catholic church of St. Mary is built to a design of E. W. Pugin.
- 1941 – 3 March – German bombers damage town.
- 1948 – 6 to 12 August – Flood damages town. Much of the town underwater.
- 1949 – 5 December – Closure of Haddington's railway station to the public.
- 1973 – Completion of the re-roofing of the choir & renovation of St Mary's Church. This part of the church was damaged during the siege of Haddington (1547–1549) and left ruinous when the church was restored following the siege.

On 5 September 1618 a debt collector from Edinburgh, Thomas Allan, was attacked by Isobel Addington and 60 or 80 other women who beat him and then dragged him by the feet out of her house.

== Notable people ==
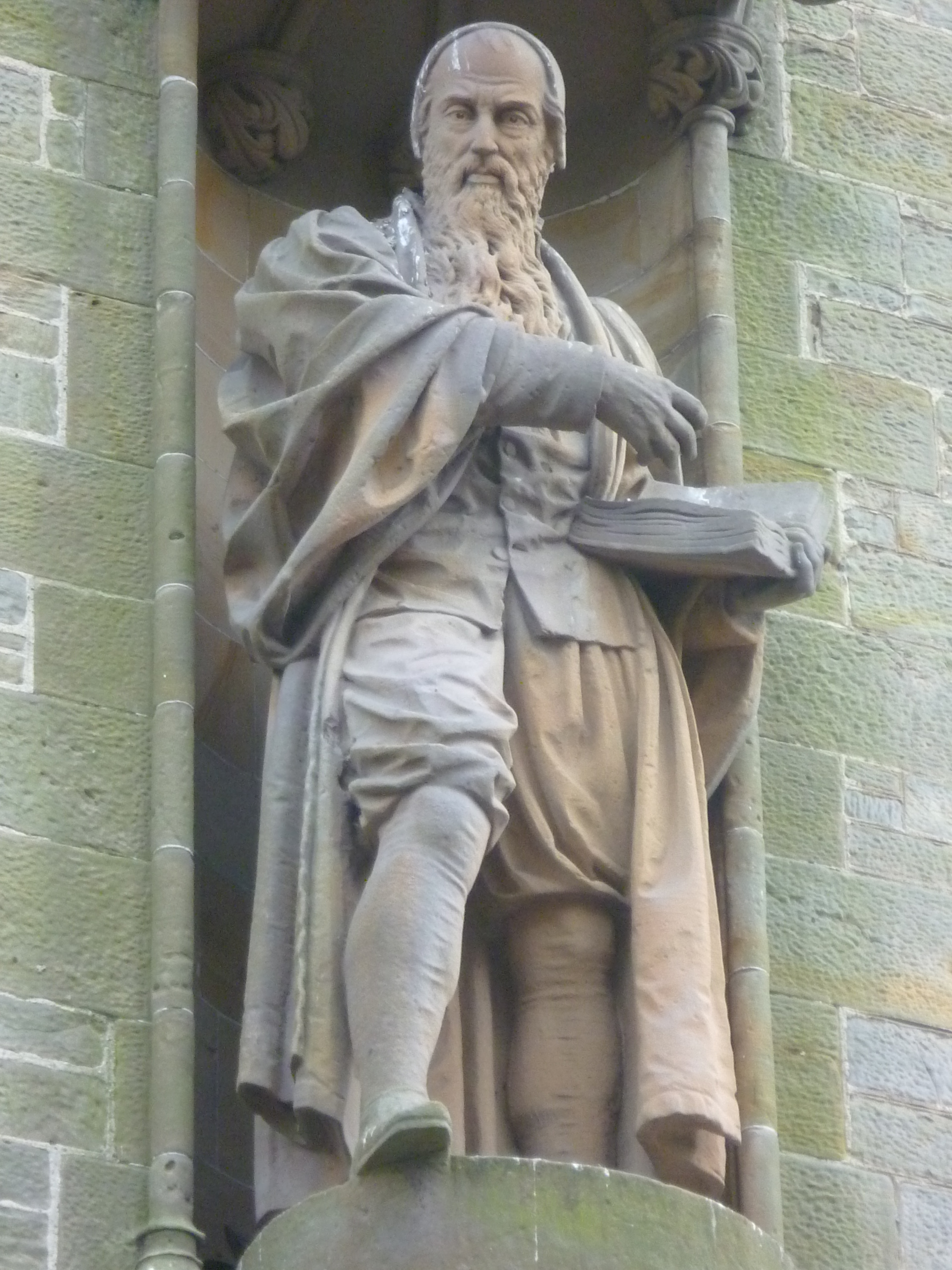
John Knox statue on the former John Knox Institute, Haddington

- Alexander II (1198–1249), King of Scotland from 1214 until 1249
- Walter Bower (1385–1449), abbot of Inchcolm Abbey and early historian (author of Scotichronicon; completed in 1447)
- John Brown of Haddington (1722–1787), theologian and author of The Self-interpreting Bible (known as 'Brown's Bible') and A Dictionary of the Holy Bible. Became minister in Haddington in 1751 and is buried in the churchyard of St Mary's.
- Samuel Morison Brown (1817–1856), chemist and writer, grandson of John Brown, born in Haddington.
- Finlay Calder (born 1957), Scottish rugby player born in Haddington
- Jim Calder (rugby union) (born 1957), Scottish rugby player born in Haddington
- Jane Welsh Carlyle (1801–1866), wife of the writer Thomas Carlyle, daughter of a local doctor. She was buried next to her father in the choir of St Mary's Church, at that time still ruined.
- James Carmichael (1542/3-1628) minister, schoolmaster, latin scholar and collector of Scots proverbs.
- Sir Richard Cockburn of Clerkington (c.1565–1627), senior government official during the reign of King James VI.
- John Cook Moderator of the General Assembly of the Church of Scotland in 1866.
- Margaret Cunnison (1914 –2004), Scottish aviator and the first Scottish woman flying instructor. She was one of the first women to join the Air Transport Auxiliary.
- John Currie, Moderator of the General Assembly of the Church of Scotland in 1709.
- Fish (born 1958), rock musician, lives in Haddington after leaving Marillion in 1988.
- William George Gillies (1898–1973), painter born in the High Street. Student and later principal of the Edinburgh College of Art, several of his works are in the Talbot Rice Gallery in the University of Edinburgh.
- John Gray (1646–1717), preacher, scholar and book collector, was born and died in Haddington. He assembled an important library of early printed books which was sold to the National Library of Scotland in 1961.
- Anne Gunn (née Young, 1756 – ?1813), music teacher and inventor.
- Bruce Robert Howard (born 1961), better known as Dr. Robert of 1980s pop band The Blow Monkeys, born in Haddington
- John Knox (1505, 1513 or 1514–1572), great Protestant reformer born (probably in Nungate on the east bank of the River Tyne, opposite St Mary's) and educated in the town
- James Lauder (d.1696), Sheriff-Clerk, Provost, Commissioner to Parliament, and Commissioner to the Convention of Burghs, and M.P., for Haddington
- David de Lindsay of the Byres, 13th-century Scottish crusader
- Robert Lorimer (1765-1848), ministered for over 50 years in Haddington.
- John Mair (also known as Haddingtonus Scotus) (1467–1550), Scottish philosopher, friend of Erasmus and teacher of Calvin, Ignatius Loyola, John Knox, and other Scottish Protestant Reformers including the Protestant martyr Patrick Hamilton and the humanist and Latin stylist George Buchanan. He held many university and government positions.
- Janet Mouat Uk women doctor who qualified in 1900.
- Adam Skirving (1719–1803), songwriter, author of the famous Jacobite song Hey, Johnnie Cope, Are Ye Waking Yet?, was born in Haddington, farmed at Garleton, and was buried at Athelstaneford. Also his grandson Robert Scot Skirving who became an eminent physician in Australia.
- Samuel Smiles (1812–1904), social reformer and author of Self Help (1859), lived in the High Street.
- Ada de Warenne, Countess of Northumbria and Huntingdon (1120–1178), Mother of Malcolm IV and William the Lion, Kings of Scots. Founded the Nunnery for which the Nungate is named.
- Willie Wood (born 1938), bowls player who took part in a record seven Commonwealth Games and won two gold medals was born in Haddington and grew up in nearby Gifford.
- Thomas Wright (philanthropist) (1789–1875), prison philanthropist

=== Freedom of the Burgh ===
People who have received the Freedom of the burgh of Haddington include:

- Arthur Balfour, Prime Minister, on 20 September 1902.

== Churches ==
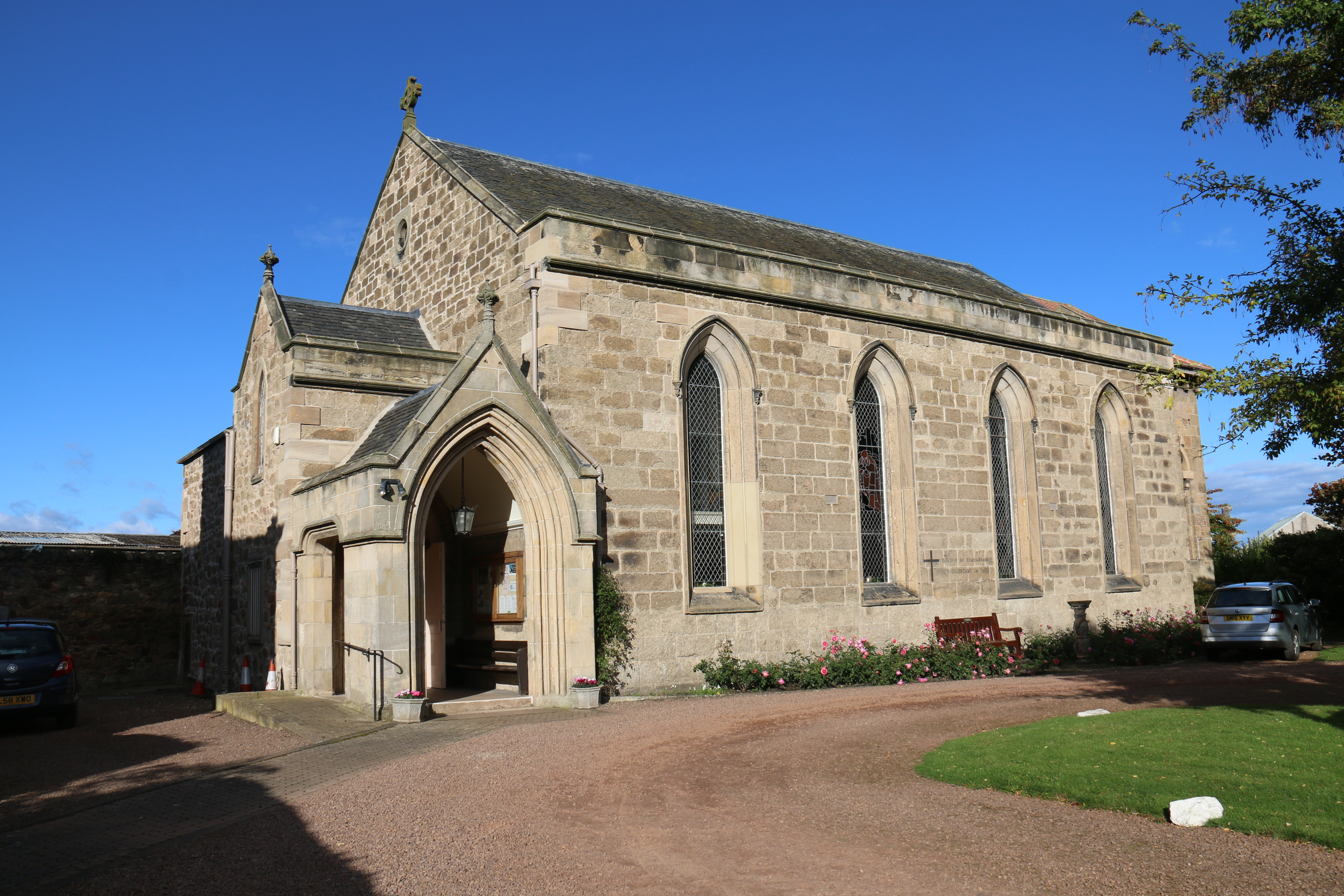
Holy Trinity Episcopal Church

There are several churches in the town. These include:

=== Church of Scotland ===
- St. Mary's Parish Church
- Haddington West Parish Church

=== Roman Catholic ===
- St Mary's

=== Other churches ===
- Haddington Community Church
- Holy Trinity Episcopal Church
- Haddington Elim Church

== Governance ==
Douglas Alexander, of the Scottish Labour Party has served as the MP for Lothian East since 2024. Paul McLennan of the Scottish National Party has served as the MSP for East Lothian since 2021. There are four councillors for Haddington and Lammermuir.

== Education ==
Haddington has three state primary schools; the first being Haddington primary school,the second being St. Mary's RC Primary School and third being Letham Mains primary school. Both HPS and Saint Mary’s are located adjacent to Neilson Park at the southern edge of the town centre and Letham Mains is in the Letham estate on the western outskirts . Prior to October 2012, Haddington Infant School was two separate buildings; the main building (built in 1897) and the annex (built in 1965) was located at Victoria Road/Meadowpark and the old St. Mary's Primary School was located at Tynebank Road. Following the discovery of structural defects at the old St Mary's RC Primary School in early-2009, the pupils temporarily attended makeshift classrooms at King's Meadow Primary School until the building was deemed safe again around mid-2009. In April 2011, East Lothian Council decided to build an entirely new school, because both schools would still be left with major problems even after substantial upgrades. A third primary school started construction at Letham Mains in April 2019, to serve the large number of new houses that have been built on the west side of the town from 2016 onwards. Secondary school pupils attend Knox Academy at Pencaitland Road. The Compass School, an independent fee-paying primary school and nursery, is located on the West Road.

Historically, the Burgh schools mostly had a good reputation, an exception being under Rev. William Whyte who retained his office despite reports of violence and even death due to his brutal discipline. Thomas Donaldson is recorded as being a Jacobite prisoner.

== Twin towns ==
Haddington is twinned with:

- Aubigny-sur-Nère, Cher, France

== Art ==
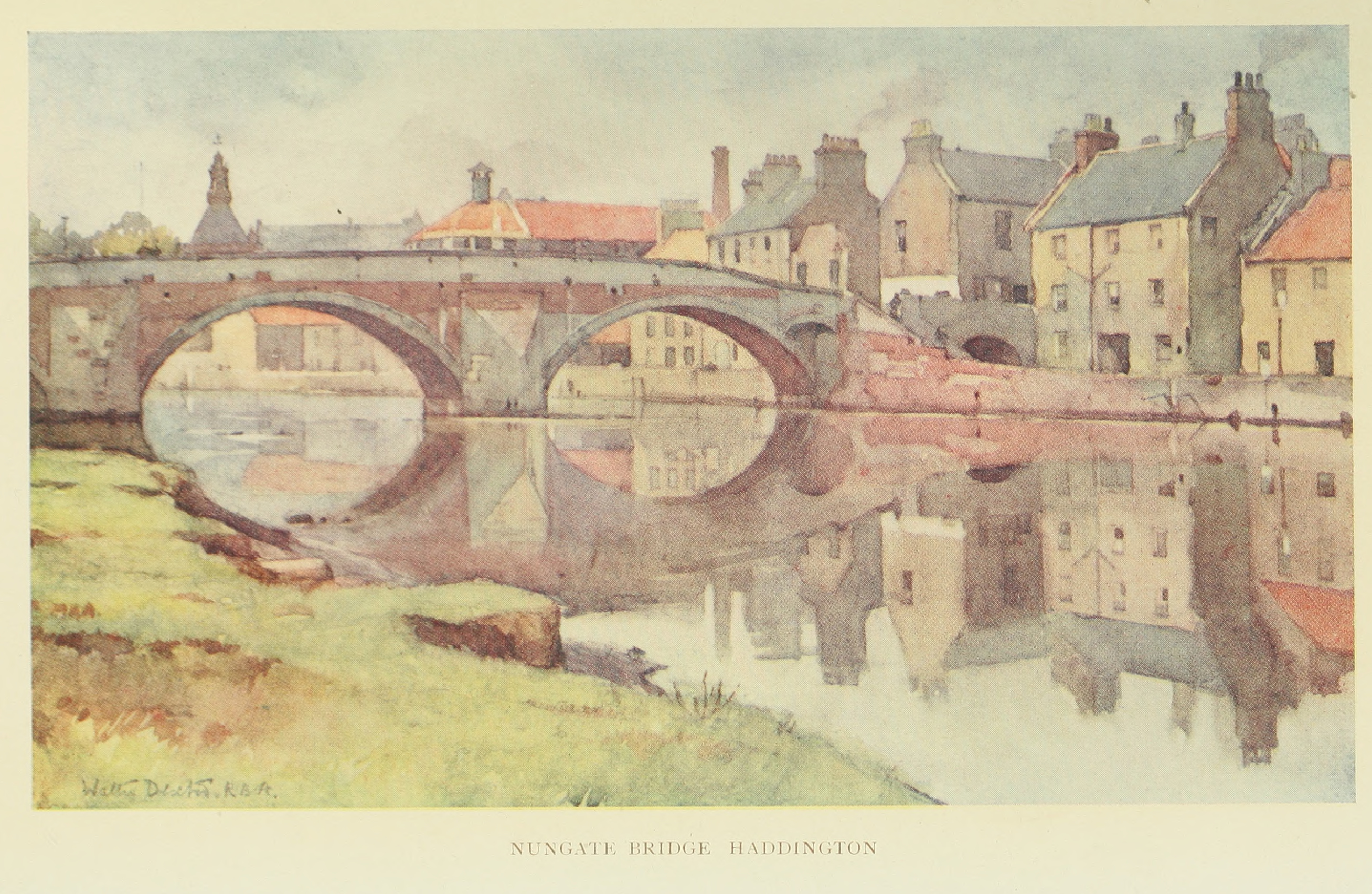
Nungate Bridge, Haddington by Walter Dexter

Art and artists associated with Haddington include:

Stephen Baillie, John Guthrie Spence Smith, William Darling McKay, Colin Thoms, William George Gillies, Daisy R. Sharp Robert Noble, Shirley M. Maud, Walter Dexter, and Haugh.

== On film ==
Films which have shots of Haddington include:

- Lothian Landscape (1974) 21 mins, colour. Narrated by Gordon Jackson and
- Lothians Part II, the: Industries and Towns (1956+) silent.

== See also ==
- Herdmanflat Hospital, Haddington
- Roodlands General Hospital, Haddington
- Skid Hill
