= Archdiocese of St Andrews =

Episcopal jurisdiction in early modern and medieval Scotland

Diocese of St Andrews
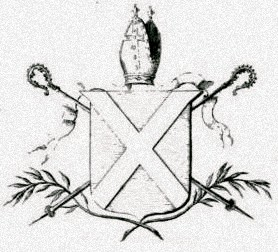
- Head: Bishop of St Andrews
- Archdeacon(s): St Andrews, Lothian
- First attestation: Early Middle Ages
- Metropolitan before 1472: None
- Metropolitan after 1492: None
- Cathedral: St Andrews Cathedral
- Dedication: Andrew
- Native dedication: Riagal (Regulus)
- Mensal churches: Cranston, Edzell, Fettercairn, Forteviot, Inchbrayock, Inchture, Kilmany, Kinnell, Kirkliston, Lasswade, Monimail, Nenthorn, Scoonie, Stow of Wedale, Tannadice, Tyninghame
- Common churches: [Priory] Abercrombie, Auldcathy, Binning, Bourtie, Conveth, Cupar, Dairsie, Dull, Ecclesgreig, Fordoun, Forgan, Foss, Fowlis-Easter, Grantully, Haddington, Inchture, Kennoway, Kilgour, Kinnedar, Lathrisk, Leuchars, Linlithgow, Longforgan, Markinch, Meigle, Migvie, Muckersie, Portmoak, Rossie, St Andrews Holy Trinity, St Andrews St Leonard's, Scoonie, Strathmiglo, Tannadice, Tarland, Tealing, Tyninghame
- Prebendal churches: Currie (archdeacon of Lothian), Kinneff (Archdeacon of St Andrews), Rescobie (archdeacon of St Andrews), Tarvit (archdeacon of St Andrews)
- Catholic successor: Roman Catholic Archdiocese of St Andrews and Edinburgh
- Episcopal successor: Diocese of Saint Andrews, Dunkeld and Dunblane & Diocese of Edinburgh

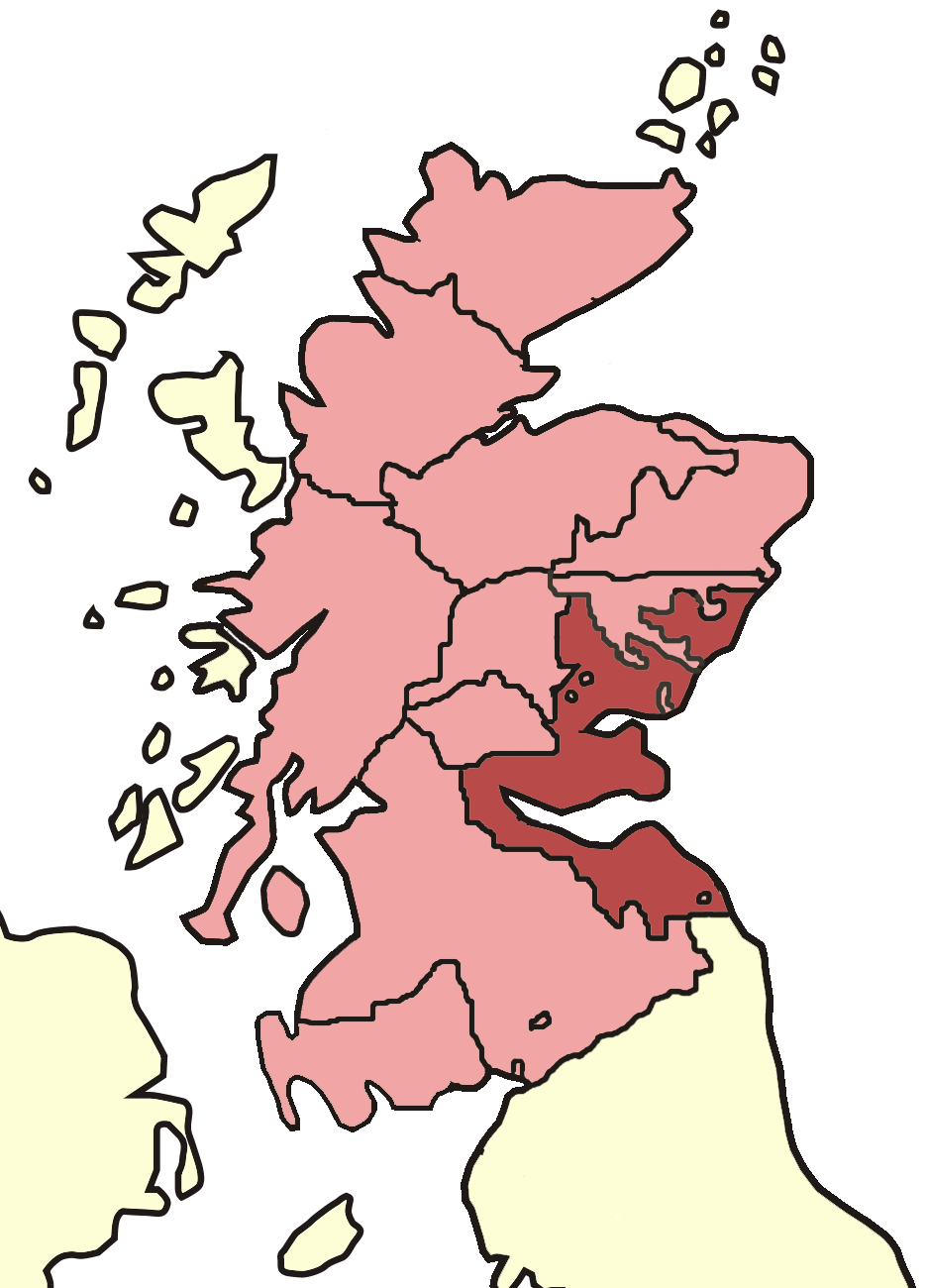
Skene's map of Scottish bishoprics in the reign of David I (reigned 1124–1153).

The Archdiocese of St Andrews (originally the Diocese of St Andrews) was a territorial episcopal jurisdiction of the Catholic Church in early modern and medieval Scotland. It was the largest, most populous and wealthiest diocese of the medieval Scottish Catholic church, with territory in eastern Scotland stretching from Berwickshire and the Anglo-Scottish border to Aberdeenshire.

Although not an archdiocese until 1472, St Andrews was recognised as the chief see of the Scottish church from at least the 11th century. It came to be one of two archdioceses of the Scottish church, from the early 16th century having the bishoprics of Aberdeen, Brechin, Caithness, Dunblane, Dunkeld, Moray, Orkney and Ross as suffragans.

== Origins ==
One Pictish king-list credits Óengus II, King of the Picts (died 834), as the founder of the monastery-church at St Andrews, but an obituary of a St Andrews' abbot is recorded in the Annals of Ulster for the year 747, around seven decades before this king ruled. The obituary of Túathalán, the abbot in question, constitutes the earliest literary evidence for St Andrews. It is possible that the church was founded during the reign of Óengus I, who had been ruling during this time.

Historian Jame Fraser points out that in England both Canterbury and York were dedicated to St Peter, with their junior bishoprics dedicated to St Andrew, that is, the churches of Hexham and Rochester. It is possible thus that St Andrews was established as a bishopric from the outset, junior to the bishopric of Rosemarkie, which appears originally to have been dedicated to St Peter. It is also possible that the emergence of the cult of St Andrew in the 8th century was connected with the appearance of "Constantine" as a royal name in the era, St Andrew being the patron of Constantinople.

== Bishops of the Scots ==
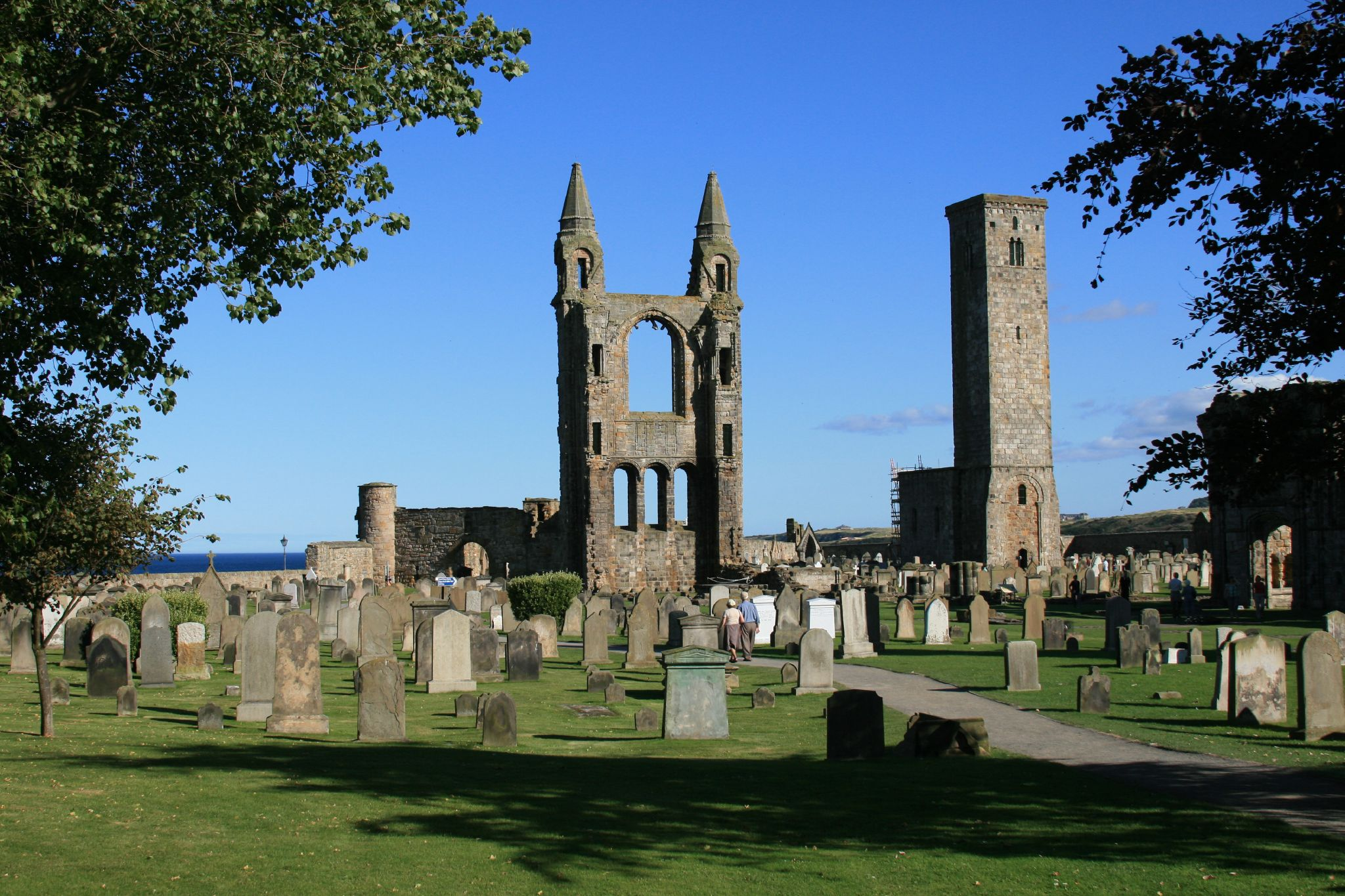
Modern ruins of St Andrews Cathedral, the seat of the diocese

The diocese's head, the Bishop of St Andrews, came to be regarded as the chief cleric of the kingdom of Scotland, ahead of the Bishop of Glasgow (2nd), the Bishop of Dunkeld (3rd) and the Bishop of Aberdeen (4th). The Augustinian account of the foundation of St Andrews, written between 1140 and 1153, notes and comments on a book-cover (cumdach) and the titles of the bishops:

...[F]rom ancient times they have been called bishops of St Andrew, and in both ancient and modern writings they are found called "High Archbishops" or "High Bishops of the Scots". Which is why Fothad, a man of the greatest authority, caused to be written on the cover of a gospel book these lines:
'Fothad, who is High Bishop of the Scots, made this cover for an ancestral gospel-book'.
So now in the ordinary and common speech they are called Escop Alban, that is, "Bishops of Alba".

After the archbishopric of York received its first French archbishop, Thomas of Bayeux, York was claiming the Scottish bishoprics beyond the River Forth to be its suffragans as part of the hierarchy of the Latin Church. Because Scotland, north of the Forth, had never been in the Roman Empire or part of Anglo-Saxon England, it was difficult for the church of York to produce any evidence of its claim, but it was established that Britannia had two archbishops in the Latin hierarchy. The time of Giric (fl. 1100), styled as Archbishop in Scottish sources, St Andrews is claimed to be an "apostolic see" and the "second Rome".

Eadmer, an Englishman from Canterbury was appointed to St Andrews by Alexander I in 1120, but was forced to resign the see soon after because Alexander I would not agree to make the bishopric part of the English church under Canterbury. Although possessing native Scottish bishops until the end of the 11th-century, with Fothad II or Cathróe being the last, the diocese was to have no Scottish-born bishops until the accession David de Bernham in 1239. Despite this, the Scottish see withstood York and Canterbury pressure, delivered through the Pope and the English king. Requests were made to the papacy for an archbishopric at St Andrews, and although these failed, the Scottish bishoprics were recognised as independent in 1192.

In 1472, Scotland seized Norðreyjar, which had been pledged by the King of Norway, in 1468, as security for the promise of a dowry which was never delivered. Accordingly, the diocese of Caithness was transferred from the Archdiocese of Niðaróss (Trondheim), in Norway, to oversight by St Andrews. At this juncture, St Andrews became a papally-recognized archbishopric.

== Extent and possessions ==
Papal assessors in the late 13th century put the diocese's income at just over 8000 pounds, twice that recorded for the diocese of Glasgow. The diocese was the largest in the medieval Kingdom of Scotland territorially, stretching from Berwick-upon-Tweed to Nigg on the river Dee near Aberdeen. Like many other Scottish dioceses, its territory was fragmented in parts. Detached parishes of the bishoprics of Aberdeen, Dunblane and Dunkeld cut up the diocese, while the diocese of Brechin lay entirely within its boundaries.

The bishops possessed a castle in St Andrews, and manors through their diocese fortified during the episcopate of William de Lamberton: Inchmurdo, Dairsie, Monimail, Torry, Kettins and Monymusk, all north of the Forth, and Stow of Wedale, Lasswade, and Liston in Lothian. There was also an important episcopal manor at Tyninghame near Dunbar.

When it became an archdiocese in 1472, the other 12 Scottish sees became its suffragans. In 1492, however, the diocese of Glasgow became an archbishopric too, taking Dunkeld, Dunblane, Argyll, and Galloway (as well as Glasgow) away from St Andrews. Within a few decades Dunkeld and Dunblane were back under St Andrews, though the bishopric of the Isles was transferred to Glasgow later.

== Organisation ==
By 1300 232 parish churches are known for the diocese. It was divided into two territorial archdeaconries, both divided into provincial deaneries:

=== Archdeaconry of St Andrews ===
==== Deanery of Angus ====
1. Aberlemno
2. Airlie
3. Aldbar
4. Arbirlot
5. Arbroath and Ethie
6. Barry
7. Dalbog
8. Dun
9. Dunlappie
10. Dunninald
11. Edzell
12. Eassie
13. Glamis
14. Idvies (now Kirkden)
15. Inchbraoch (now Craig)
16. Inverarity
17. Invergowrie
18. Inverkeilor
19. Inverlunan
20. Kettins
21. Kinnell
22. Kinnettles
23. Kirriemuir
24. Liff
25. Lintrathen
26. Logie
27. Logie Dundee (now Lochee)
28. Lundie
29. Martin (now Strathmartine)
30. Meathie Lour
31. Monifieth
32. Murroes
33. Nevay
34. Newtyle
35. Rescobie
36. Restenneth and Forfar
37. Tannadice
38. Strathdighty
39. Strathdighty Comitis (now Mains)

==== Deanery of Fife ====
1. Abercrombie (now St Monance)
2. Anstruther
3. Auchtermoonzie (now Moonzie)
4. Ceres
5. Crail
6. Collessie
7. Creich
8. Cupar
9. Dairsie
10. Dunbog
11. Dunino
12. Flisk
13. Forgan
14. Kellie (now Carnbee)
15. Kemback
16. Kennoway
17. Kilconquhar
18. Kilmany
19. Kilrenny
20. Largo
21. Leuchars
22. Lindores (or Abdie)
23. Logie Murdoch
24. Monimail
25. Newburn
26. St Andrews
27. Scoonie
28. Tarvit

==== Deanery of Fothriff ====
1. Arngask
2. Auchterderran
3. Auchtermuchty
4. Carnock
5. Clackmannan
6. Cleish
7. Cults
8. Dunfermline
9. Dysart
10. Forthar (now Kirkforthar)
11. Inverkeithing
12. Kilgour (now Falkland)
13. Kinglassie
14. Kinross
15. Kirkcaldy
16. Lathrisk (now Kettle)
17. Magna Kinghorn (now Kinghorn)
18. Markinch
19. Methil
20. Muckhart
21. Parva Kinghorn (now Burntisland)
22. Portmoak
23. Torry (now Torryburn)
24. Wemyss

==== Deanery of Gowrie ====
1. Benvie
2. Blair (now Blairgowrie)
3. Cambusmichael
4. Collace
5. Errol
6. Forgan (now Longforgan)
7. Forteviot
8. Fowlis
9. Inchture
10. Kilspindie
11. Kinfauns
12. Kinnoull
13. Luncarty
14. Methven
15. Perth
16. Pottie (now Dunbarney)
17. Rait
18. Rhynd
19. Rossinclerach (now Rossie)
20. Scone

==== Deanery of Mearns ====
1. Aberluthnot (now Marykirk)
2. Arbuthnott
3. Benholm
4. Conveth (now Laurencekirk)
5. Dunnottar
6. Durris
7. Ecclesgreig (now St Cyrus)
8. Fettercairn
9. Fetteresso
10. Fordoun
11. Garvock
12. Kinneff
13. Newdosk
14. Nigg

=== Archdeaconry of Lothian ===
==== Deanery of Haddington ====
1. Athelstaneford
2. Auldhame
3. Bara
4. Bolton
5. Bothans (now Yester)
6. Carrington
7. Clerkington (now Temple)
8. Cockpen
9. Cranston
10. Crichton
11. Dunbar
12. Fala
13. Garvald
14. Gullane
15. Haddington
16. Hamer (now Whitekirk)
17. Heriot
18. Innerwick
19. Keith Humbie (now Humbie)
20. Keith Marischal
21. Linton (now Prestonkirk)
22. Loquhariot (now Borthwick)
23. Masterton (now Newbattle)
24. Morham
25. Mount Lothian
26. Musselburgh
27. North Berwick
28. Oldhamstocks
29. Ormiston
30. Pencaitland
31. Saltoun
32. Seton
33. Soutra
34. Tranent
35. Tyninghame

==== Deanery of Linlithgow ====
1. Airth
2. Auldcathie
3. Bathgate
4. Binny
5. Bothkennar
6. Calder Comitis (now West Calder)
7. Calder Clere (now East Calder)
8. Carriden
9. Dalmeny
10. Dunipace
11. Duddingston
12. Ecclesmachan
13. Falkirk
14. Gogar
15. Hailes (now Colinton)
16. Kinleith (now Currie)
17. Kinneil
18. Kirkton (now St Ninians)
19. Larbert
20. Lasswade
21. Linlithgow
22. Liston (now Kirkliston)
23. Livingston
24. Melville
25. Newton (now Kirknewton)
26. Penicuik
27. Pentland
28. Ratho
29. Restalrig
30. St Cuthbert-under-the Castle
31. St Giles of Edinburgh
32. St Mary in the Fields
33. Slamannan
34. Stirling
35. Strathbrock (now Uphall)
36. Woolmet (now Newton)

==== Deanery of Merse ====
1. Berwick
2. Channelkirk
3. Chirnside
4. Coldingham
5. Cranshaws
6. Duns
7. Earlston
8. Eccles
9. Ednam
10. Edrom
11. Ellem (now Ellemford)
12. Fishwick
13. Fogo
14. Foulden
15. Gordon
16. Greenlaw
17. Hallyburton
18. Hilton
19. Horndean
20. Hume
21. Hutton
22. Lamberton
23. Langton
24. Legerwood
25. Lennel (now Coldstream)
26. Lauder
27. Makerstoun
28. Mertoun
29. Mordington
30. Nenthorn
31. Old Cambus
32. Polwarth
33. St Bathans (now Abbey St Bathans)
34. Simprim
35. Smailholm
36. Swinton
37. Stichill
38. Upsettlington (now Ladykirk)
39. Wedale (now Stow)
40. Whitsome

== See also ==
- Roman Catholic Archdiocese of St Andrews and Edinburgh
- Scottish Episcopal Church Diocese of St Andrews, Dunkeld and Dunblane
