= Archdeaconry of Lothian =

The Archdeaconry of Lothian, located in modern-day Scotland, was a sub-division of the diocese of St Andrews, one of two archdeaconries within the diocese and in essence that part of the diocese which lay south of the Forth. The Lothian archdeaconry was headed by the Archdeacon of Lothian, a subordinate of the Bishop of St Andrews.

== Organisation ==
In the medieval period, the Archdeaconry of Lothian contained three deaneries: Linlithgow, Haddington and Merse.

=== Deanery of Linlithgow ===
1. Strivelin (Stirling)
2. Penicok (Penicuik)
3. Pentland
4. Lasswade
5. Melville
6. Wymeth (now Woolmet)
7. Dodiniston (Duddingston)
8. Liberton
9. Lestalrig (Restalrig)
10. St Giles, Edinburgh
11. St Cuthbert-under-the-castle
12. Gogar
13. Hailes (now Colinton)
14. Ratho
15. Newton (now Kirknewton)
16. Calder clericorum (now East Calder)
17. Calder comitis (now Midcalder)
18. Binning
19. Strathbrock (now Uphall)
20. Torphichen
21. Eglismachane (Ecclesmachan)
22. Levinistun (Livingston)
23. Bathket (Bathgate)
24. Dunmanyn (now Dalmeny)
25. Listun or Temple Liston (now Kirkliston)
26. Karedin (Carriden)
27. Kinneil
28. Linlidcu (Linlithgow)
29. Slethmanyn (Slamannan)
30. Dunipas (Dunipace)
31. Lethbert (now Larbert)
32. Gargunnock
33. Burthkener (Bothkennar)
34. Auldcathie
35. Eccles Brec (now Falkirk)
36. Ercht (Airth)
37. Kirkton or Eccles (now St Ninians)
38. Killeith (now Currie)

=== Deanery of Lothian or Haddington ===
1. Aldhamstoke (Oldhamstocks)
2. Innerwick
3. Dunbar
4. Whittinghame
5. Tiningham (Tyninghame)
6. Hamir (or Whitekirk)
7. Hanus (Pitcox)
8. Auldhame
9. Linton (now Prestonkirk)
10. North Berwick
11. Haddington St Mary
12. St Martins Kirk in Nungate
13. Elstanford (Athelstaneford)
14. Garvald
15. Barive (Bara)
16. Morham
17. Bothan or St Bothans (now Gifford)
18. Boultun (Bolton)
19. Sawiltun (Saltoun)
20. Penkathland (Pencaitland)
21. Golyn (Gullane) now Dirleton
22. Seton
23. Travernent (Tranent)
24. Muskelburgh (Inveresk)
25. Cranistun (Cranston)
26. Krektun (Crichton)
27. Kethhundley (now Humbie)
28. Kethmarchal (Keith Marischal)
29. Falawe (Fala)
30. Louchwhorvir (now Borthwick)
31. Kerinton (Carrington)
32. Kokpen Cockpen
33. Clerktun (now Temple)
34. Maystertun (now Newbattle)
35. Herieth (Heriot)
36. Mount Lothian
37. Ormiston

=== Deanery of the Merse ===
1. Aldkambus (Old Cambus)
2. Coldingham
3. Lamberton
4. Berwick
5. Mordington
6. Foulden
7. Chirnside
8. Ednam
9. Duns
10. Ellim
11. Cranshaws
12. St Bothan's Kirk (Abbey St Bathans)
13. Langton
14. Fishwick
15. Hutton
16. Horndene
17. Edrom
18. Ayton
19. Upsettlington
20. Hilton
21. Whitsome
22. Simprim
23. Swinton
24. Lennel (now Coldstream)
25. Fogo
26. Polwarth
27. Greenlaw
28. Gordon
29. Haliburton
30. Hume
31. Stichill
32. Eccles
33. Smailholm
34. Makerstoun
35. Mertoun
36. Ercildoun (Earlston)
37. Legerwood
38. Lauder
39. Wedale (now Stow)
40. Childenchurche (Channelkirk)
41. Naythansthirn (Nenthorn)
42. Kelso
43. Bassendean
