= David I and the Scottish Church =

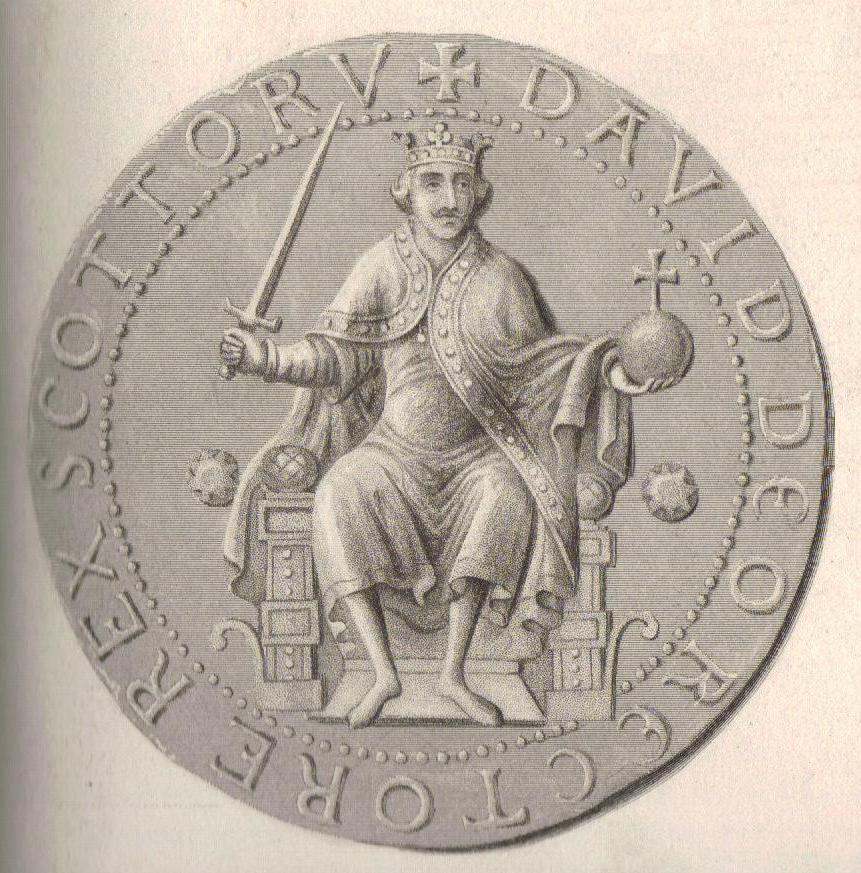
Steel engraving and enhancement of the obverse side of the Great Seal of David I, portraying David in the "European" fashion the other worldly maintainer of peace and defender of justice.

Historical treatment of David I and the Scottish church usually emphasises King David I of Scotland's pioneering role as the instrument of diocesan reorganisation and Norman penetration, beginning with the bishopric of Glasgow while David was Prince of the Cumbrians, and continuing further north after David acceded to the throne of Scotland. As well as this and his monastic patronage, focus too is usually given to his role as the defender of the Scottish church's independence from claims of overlordship by the Archbishop of York and the Archbishop of Canterbury.

== Renewed bishopric of Glasgow ==
Almost as soon as he was in charge of the Cumbrian principality, David placed the bishopric of Glasgow under his chaplain, John, whom David may have met for the first time during his participation in Henry's conquest of Normandy after 1106. John himself was closely associated with the Tironensian Order, and presumably committed to the new Gregorian ideas regarding episcopal organisation. David carried out an inquest and afterwards assigned to the bishopric all the lands of his principality, except those in the east of his principality which were already governed by the Scotland-proper based bishop of St Andrews. David was responsible for assigning to Glasgow enough lands directly to make the bishopric self-sufficient and for ensuring that in the longer term Glasgow would become the second most important bishopric in the Kingdom of Scotland. By the 1120s, work also began on building a proper cathedral for the diocese. David would also try to ensure that his reinvigorated episcopal see would retain independence from other bishoprics, an aspiration which would generate a great deal of tension with the English church, where both the Archbishop of Canterbury and the Archbishop of York claimed overlordship.

== Innovations in the church system ==
It was once held that Scotland's episcopal sees and entire parochial system owed its origins to the innovations of David I. Today, scholars have moderated this view. Although David moved the bishopric of Mortlach east to his new burgh of Aberdeen, and arranged the creation of the diocese of Caithness, no other bishoprics can be safely called David's creation. The bishopric of Glasgow was restored rather than resurrected. In the case of the Bishop of Whithorn, the resurrection of that see was the work of Thurstan, Archbishop of York, with King Fergus of Galloway and the cleric Gille Aldan. That aside, Ailred of Rievaulx wrote in David's eulogy that when David came to power, "he found three or four bishops in the whole Scottish kingdom [north of the Forth], and the others wavering without a pastor to the loss of both morals and property; when he died, he left nine, both of ancient bishoprics which he himself restored, and new ones which he erected". What is very likely is that, as well as preventing the long vacancies in bishoprics which had hitherto been common, David was at least partly responsible for forcing semi-monastic "bishoprics" like Brechin, Dunkeld, Mortlach (Aberdeen) and Dublane to become fully episcopal and firmly integrated into a national diocesan system. As for the development of the parochial system, David's traditional role as its creator can not be sustained. Scotland already had an ancient system of parish churches dating to the Early Middle Ages, and the kind of system introduced by David's Normanising tendencies can more accurately be seen as mild refashioning, rather than creation; he made the Scottish system as a whole more like that of France and England, but he did not create it.

== Monasticism ==
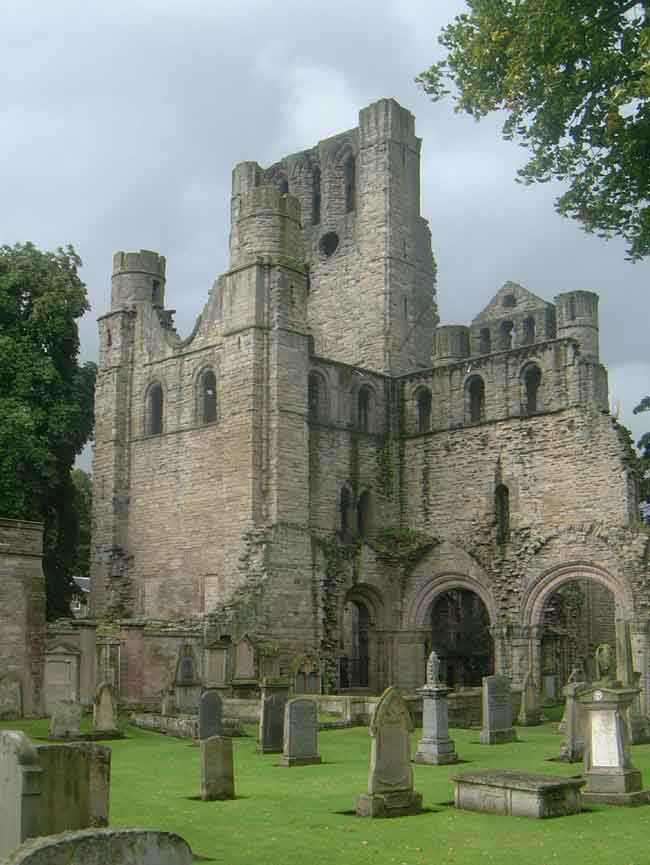
The modern ruins of Kelso Abbey. This establishment was originally at Selkirk from 1113, but was moved to Kelso in 1128 to better serve David's southern "capital" at Roxburgh.

David was certainly at least one of medieval Scotland's greatest monastic patrons. In 1113, in perhaps David's first act as Prince of the Cumbrians, he founded Selkirk Abbey for the Tironensian Order. Several years later, perhaps in 1116, David visited Tiron itself, probably to acquire more monks; in 1128 he transferred Selkirk Abbey to Kelso, nearer Roxburgh, at this point his chief residence. In 1144, David and Bishop John of Glasgow prompted Kelso Abbey to found a daughter house, Lesmahagow Priory. David also continued his predecessor Alexander's patronage of the Augustinians, founding Holyrood Abbey with monks from Merton Priory. David and Bishop John, moreover, established Jedburgh Abbey with canons from Beauvais in 1138. Other Augustinian foundations included St Andrew's Cathedral Priory, established by David and Bishop Robert of St Andrews in 1140, which in turn founded an establishment at Loch Leven (1150x1153); an Augustinian abbey, whose canons were taken from Arrouaise in France, was established by the year 1147 at Cambuskenneth near Stirling, another prominent royal centre. However, by 23 March 1137, David had also turned his patronage towards the Cistercian Order, founding the famous Melrose Abbey from monks of Rievaulx. Melrose would become the greatest medieval monastic establishment in Scotland south of the river Forth. It was from Melrose that David established Newbattle Abbey in Midlothian, Kinloss Abbey in Moray, and Holmcultram Abbey in Cumberland. David also, like Alexander, patronized Benedictines, introducing monks to Coldingham (a non-monastic property of Durham Priory) in 1139 and making it a priory by 1149. David's activities were paralleled by other "Scottish" magnates. For instance, the Premonstratensian house of Dryburgh Abbey was founded in 1150 by monks from Alnwick Abbey with the patronage of Hugh de Morville, Lord of Lauderdale. Moreover, six years after the foundation of Melrose Abbey, King Fergus of Galloway likewise founded a Cistercian abbey from Rievaulx, Dundrennan Abbey, which would become a powerful landowner in both Galloway and Ireland and was known to Francesco Pegolotti as Scotland's richest abbey.

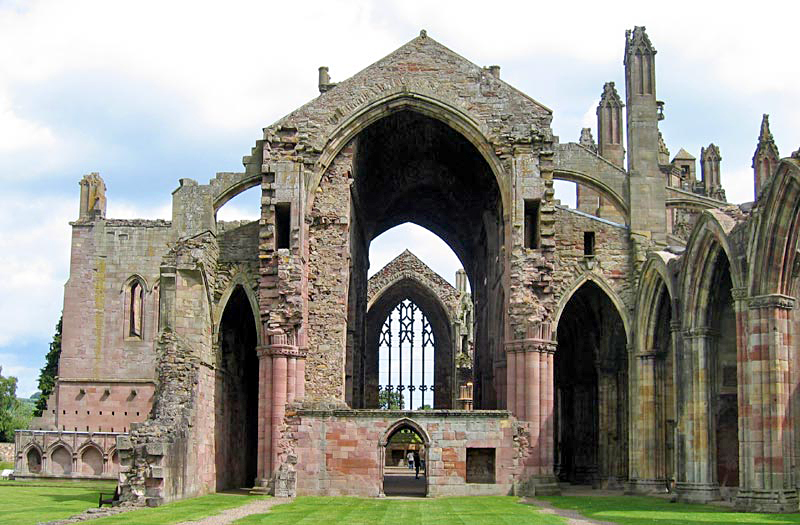
The modern ruins of Melrose Abbey. Founded in 1137, this Cistercian monastery became one of David's greatest legacies.

Not only were such monasteries an expression of David's undoubted piety, but they also functioned to transform Scottish society. Monasteries became centres of foreign influence, being founded by French or English monks. They provided sources of literate men, able to serve the crown's growing administrative needs. This was particularly the case with the Augustinians. Moreover, these new monasteries, and the Cistercian ones in particular, introduced new agricultural practices. In the words of one historian, the Cistercians were "pioneers or frontiersmen ... cultural revolutionaries, who carried new techniques of land management and new attitudes towards land exploitation". Duncan calls Scotland's new Cistercian establishments "the largest and most significant contribution by David I to the religious life of the kingdom". Cistercians equated spiritual health with economic achievement and environmental exploitation. Cistercian labour transformed southern Scotland into one of northern Europe's main sources of sheep wool.

== Ecclesiastical disputes ==
One of the first problems David had to deal with as king was an ecclesiastical dispute with the English church. The problem with the English church concerned the subordination of Scottish sees to the archbishops of York and/or Canterbury, an issue which since his election in 1124 had prevented Robert of Scone from being consecrated. It is likely that since the 11th century, the bishopric of St Andrews functioned as a de facto. In the recently recovered last 20% of Version-A of the St. Andrews Foundation Legend, a text composed at the turn of the 11th and 12th centuries, some of the contemporary clerics at the bishopric of St Andrews were mentioned by name, and one of these is "Archbishop Giric", referring to Bishop Giric. Bishop Fothad II, upon his death in 1093, was recorded in the Annals of Ulster as "Fothud ardepscop Alban", that is, "Fothad, Archbishop of Scotland". The problem was that this archiepiscopal status had not been cleared with the papacy, opening the way for English archbishops to claim overlordship of the whole Scottish church.

The man responsible was the new aggressively assertive archbishop of York, Thurstan. In 1125 Thurstan once again went on the offensive. In this year Pope Honorius II wrote to David and ordered him to receive his legate, John de Crema, and to:

"Cause also the bishops of thy land to assemble to his council when they are summoned by him. The controversy which has long been kept up between Thurstan, archbishop of York, and the bishops of thy land, we commit to this our legate to be very carefully investigated and discussed; but we reserve the final decision for the judgment of the apostolic see".

No legatine council however took place, and legate John de Crema headed back through southern England. The legate was charged with investigating the historical and political status of the bishoprics of Scotland-proper, the lands north of the river Forth. However, such investigation was not needed for the two bishoprics south of the Forth. In the same year, Honorius wrote to John, bishop of Glasgow, and Gille Aldan, bishop of Galloway, ordering them to submit to the archbishopric of York. As the former was part of David's dominion, this was not the news David would have been wanting. David ordered Bishop John of Glasgow to travel to the Apostolic See in order to secure a pallium which would elevate the bishopric of St Andrews to an archbishopric. Thurstan soon arrived in Rome himself, as did the archbishop of Canterbury, William de Corbeil, and both presumably opposed David's request. David however gained the support of King Henry, and the archbishop of York agreed to a year's postponement of the issue and to consecrate Robert of Scone without making an issue of subordination. York's claims over bishops north of the Forth were in practice abandoned for the rest of David's reign, although York maintained her more credible claims over Glasgow.

== Bishopric of Durham and the Archbishopric of York ==
However, David's successes were in many ways balanced by his failures. David's greatest disappointment during this time was his inability to ensure control of the bishopric of Durham and the archbishopric of York. David had attempted to appoint his chancellor, William Comyn, to the bishopric of Durham, which had been vacant since the death of Bishop Geoffrey in 1140. Between 1141 and 1143, Comyn was the de facto bishop, and had control of the bishop's castle; but he was resented by the chapter. Despite controlling the town of Durham, David's only hope of ensuring his election and consecration was gaining the support of the Papal legate, Henry of Blois, bishop of Winchester and brother of King Stephen. Despite obtaining the support of the Empress Matilda, David was unsuccessful and had given up by the time William de St Barbara was elected to the see in 1143. David also attempted to interfere in the succession to the archbishopric of York. William FitzHerbert, nephew of King Stephen, found his position undermined by the collapsing political fortune of Stephen in the north of England, and was deposed by the pope. David used his Cistercian connections to build a bond with Henry Murdac, the new archbishop. Despite the support of Pope Eugenius III, supporters of King Stephen and William FitzHerbert managed to prevent Henry taking up his post at York. By 1149, Henry had sought the support of David. David seized on the opportunity to bring the archdiocese under Scottish control, and marched on the city. However, Stephen's supporters had gotten wind of the plan, and informed King Stephen. Stephen therefore marched to the city and installed a new garrison. David decided not to risk such an engagement and withdrew. Richard Oram has conjectured that David's ultimate aim was to bring the whole of the ancient kingdom of Northumbria into his dominion. For Oram, this event was the turning point, "the chance to radically redraw the political map of the British Isles lost forever".

== Failure of the Archbishopric of St Andrews ==
A further blow occurred on the ecclesiastical front. In 1151, David once again requested a pallium for the archbishop of St Andrews. Cardinal John Paparo met David at his residence of Carlisle in September 1151. Tantalisingly for David, the Cardinal was on his way to Ireland (usually reached from Galloway) with four pallia to create four new Irish archbishoprics. When the Cardinal returned to Carlisle, David made the request. In David's plan, the new archdiocese would include all the bishoprics in David's Scottish territory, as well as bishopric of Orkney and the bishopric of the Isles. Unfortunately for David, the Cardinal does not appear to have brought the issue up with the papacy. In fact, in the following year the papacy dealt David another blow by creating the archbishopric of Trondheim, a new Norwegian archbishopric embracing the bishoprics of the Isles and Orkney.

== Primary sources ==
- Anderson, Alan Orr (ed.), Early Sources of Scottish History: AD 500–1286, 2 Vols, (Edinburgh, 1922)
- Anderson, Alan Orr (ed.), Scottish Annals from English Chroniclers: AD 500–1286, (London, 1908), republished, Marjorie Anderson (ed.) (Stamford, 1991)
- Barrow, G. W. S., The Charters of King David I: The Written acts of David I King of Scots, 1124–1153 and of His Son Henry Earl of Northumberland, 1139–1152, (Woodbridge, 1999)
- Lawrie, Sir Archibald (ed.), Early Scottish Charters Prior to A.D. 1153, (Glasgow, 1905)

== Secondary sources ==
- Barbour, Malcolm, The Two Cities: Medieval Europe, 1050–1320, (London, 1992)
- Barrow, G. W. S. (ed.), "Badenoch and Strathspey, 1130–1312: 1. Secular and Political" in Northern Scotland, 8 (1988), pp. 1–15
- Barrow, G. W. S., "King David I and Glasgow" in G.W.S. Barrow (ed.), The Kingdom of the Scots, (Edinburgh, 2003), pp. 203–13
- Barrow, G. W. S., "David I (c.1085–1153)", in the Oxford Dictionary of National Biography, Oxford University Press, September 2004; online edn, January 2006, retrieved 11 Feb 2007
- Barrow, G. W. S., "David I of Scotland: The Balance of New and Old", in G. W. S. Barrow (ed.), Scotland and Its Neighbours in the Middle Ages, (London, 1992), pp. 45–65, originally published as the 1984 Stenton Lecture, (Reading, 1985)
- Barrow, G. W. S., Kingship and Unity: Scotland, 1000–1306, (Edinburgh. 1981)
- Barrow, G. W. S., "The Kings of Scotland and Durham", in David Rollason, Margaret Harvey & Michael Prestwich (eds.), Anglo-Norman Durham, 1093–1193, pp. 309–23
- Barrow, G. W. S., "The Royal House and the Religious Orders", in G.W.S. Barrow (ed.), The Kingdom of the Scots, (Edinburgh, 2003), pp. 151–68
- Bartlett, Robert, The Making of Europe, Conquest, Colonization and Cultural Change: 950–1350, (London, 1993)
- Broun, Dauvit, "Recovering the Full Text of Version A of the Foundation Legend", in Simon Taylor (ed.), Kings, Clerics and Chronicles in Scotland, 500–1297, (Dublin, 2000), pp. 108–14
- Broun, Dauvit, "The Welsh Identity of the Kingdom of Strathclyde", in The Innes Review, Vol. 55, no. 2 (Autumn, 2004), pp. 111–80
- Clancy, Thomas Owen, "Annat and the Origins of the Parish", in the Innes Review, vol. 46, no. 2 (1995), pp. 91–115
- Clancy, M. T., England and its Rulers, 2nd Ed., (Malden, MA, 1998)
- Cowan, Ian B., "Development of the Parochial System", in the Scottish Historical Review, 40 (1961), pp. 43–55
- Cowan, Edward J., "The Invention of Celtic Scotland", in Edward J. Cowan & R. Andrew McDonald (eds.), Alba: Celtic Scotland in the Middle Ages, (East Lothian, 2000), pp. 1–23
- Davies, R. R., Domination and Conquest: The Experience of Ireland, Scotland and Wales, 1100–1300, (Cambridge, 1990)
- Davies. R. R., The First English Empire: Power and Identities in the British Isles, 1093–1343, (Oxford, 2000)
- Donaldson, Gordon, "Scottish Bishop's Sees Before the Reign of David I", in the Proceedings of the Society of Antiquaries of Scotland, 87 (1952–53), pp. 106–17
- Dumville, David N., "St Cathróe of Metz and the Hagiography of Exoticism", in John Carey et al. (eds.), Irish Hagiography: Saints and Scholars, (Dublin, 2001), pp. 172–188
- Dowden, John, The Bishops of Scotland, ed. J. Maitland Thomson, (Glasgow, 1912)
- Duncan, A. A. M., "The Foundation of St Andrews Cathedral Priory, 1140", in The Scottish Historical Review, vol 84, (April, 2005), pp. 1–37
- Duncan, A. A. M., The Kingship of the Scots 842–1292: Succession and Independence, (Edinburgh, 2002)
- Duncan, A. A. M., Scotland: The Making of the Kingdom, (Edinburgh, 1975)
- Fawcetts, Richard, & Oram, Richard, Melrose Abbey, (Stroud, 2004)
- Follett, Wesley, Céli Dé in Ireland: Monastic Writing and Identity in the Early Middle Ages, (Woodbridge, 2006)
- Haidu, Peter, The Subject Medieval/Modern: Text and Governance in the Middle Ages, (Stamford, 2004)
- Hudson, Benjamin T., "Gaelic Princes and Gregorian Reform", in Benjamin T. Hudson and Vickie Ziegler (eds.), Crossed Paths: Methodological Approaches to the Celtic Aspects of the European Middle Ages, (Lanham, 1991), pp. 61–81
- Jackson, Kenneth, The Gaelic Notes in the Book of Deer: The Osborn Bergin Memorial Lecture 1970, (Cambridge, 1972)
- Ladner, G., "Terms and Ideas of Renewal", in Robert L. Benson, Giles Constable and Carol D. Lanham(eds.), Renaissance and Renewal in the Twelfth Century, (Oxford, 1982), pp. 1–33
- Lang, Andrew, A History of Scotland from the Roman Occupation, 2 vols, vol. 1, (Edinburgh, 1900)
- Lawrence, C. H., Medieval Monasticism: Forms of Religious Life in Western Europe in the Middle Ages, 2nd edition, (London, 1989)
- Lynch, Michael, Scotland: A New History, (Edinburgh, 1991)
- McNeill, Peter G. B. & MacQueen, Hector L. (eds), Atlas of Scottish History to 1707, (Edinburgh, 1996)
- Moore, R. I., The First European Revolution, c.970–1215, (Cambridge, 2000)
- Ó Cróinín, Dáibhí, Early Medieval Ireland: 400–1200, (Harlow, 1995)
- Oram, Richard, David: The King Who Made Scotland, (Gloucestershire, 2004)
- Oram, Richard, The Lordship of Galloway, (Edinburgh, 2000)
- Pirenne, Henri, Medieval cities: their origins and the revival of trade, trans. F.D. Halsey, (Princeton, 1925)
- Shead, Norman F., "The Origins of the Medieval Diocese of Glasgow", in the Scottish Historical Review, 48 (1969), pp. 220–5
- Stringer, Keith J., "Reform Monasticism and Celtic Scotland", in Edward J. Cowan & R. Andrew McDonald (eds.), Alba: Celtic Scotland in the Middle Ages, (East Lothian, 2000), .pp. 127–65
- Stringer, Keith J., The Reformed Church in Medieval Galloway and Cumbria: Contrasts, Connections and Continuities (The Eleventh Whithorn Lecture, 14 September 2002), (Whithorn, 2003)
- Veitch, Kenneth, "'Replanting Paradise':Alexander I and the Reform of Religious Life in Scotland", in the Innes Review, 52 (2001), pp. 136–166
- Watt, John, Church in Medieval Ireland, (Dublin, 1972)
- Yeoman, Peter, Medieval Scotland: An Archaeological Perspective, (London, 1995)
