= Turgot of Durham =

Thorgaut or Turgot (c. 1050–1115) (sometimes, Thurgot) was Archdeacon and Prior of Durham, and Bishop of Saint Andrews.

== Biography ==
=== Early life and prior at Durham ===
Turgot came from the Lindsey in Lincolnshire. After the Norman Conquest he was held as a hostage, but escaped to Norway, where he taught psalmody to King Olaf III. In about 1074 he returned to England and became a clerk at Jarrow monastery. He then became a monk at Wearmouth, and in 1087 he was appointed prior of the monastery at Durham, from 1093 combining this with the archdeaconry of Durham. He became close to the Scottish court and became in 1089 a close friend and spiritual adviser to Saint Margaret of Scotland, wife of King Malcom III and a profoundly religious person. After her death and between the years 1100 and 1107, Turgot wrote a vita of her life at the request of her daughter, Matilda, wife of King Henry I of England.

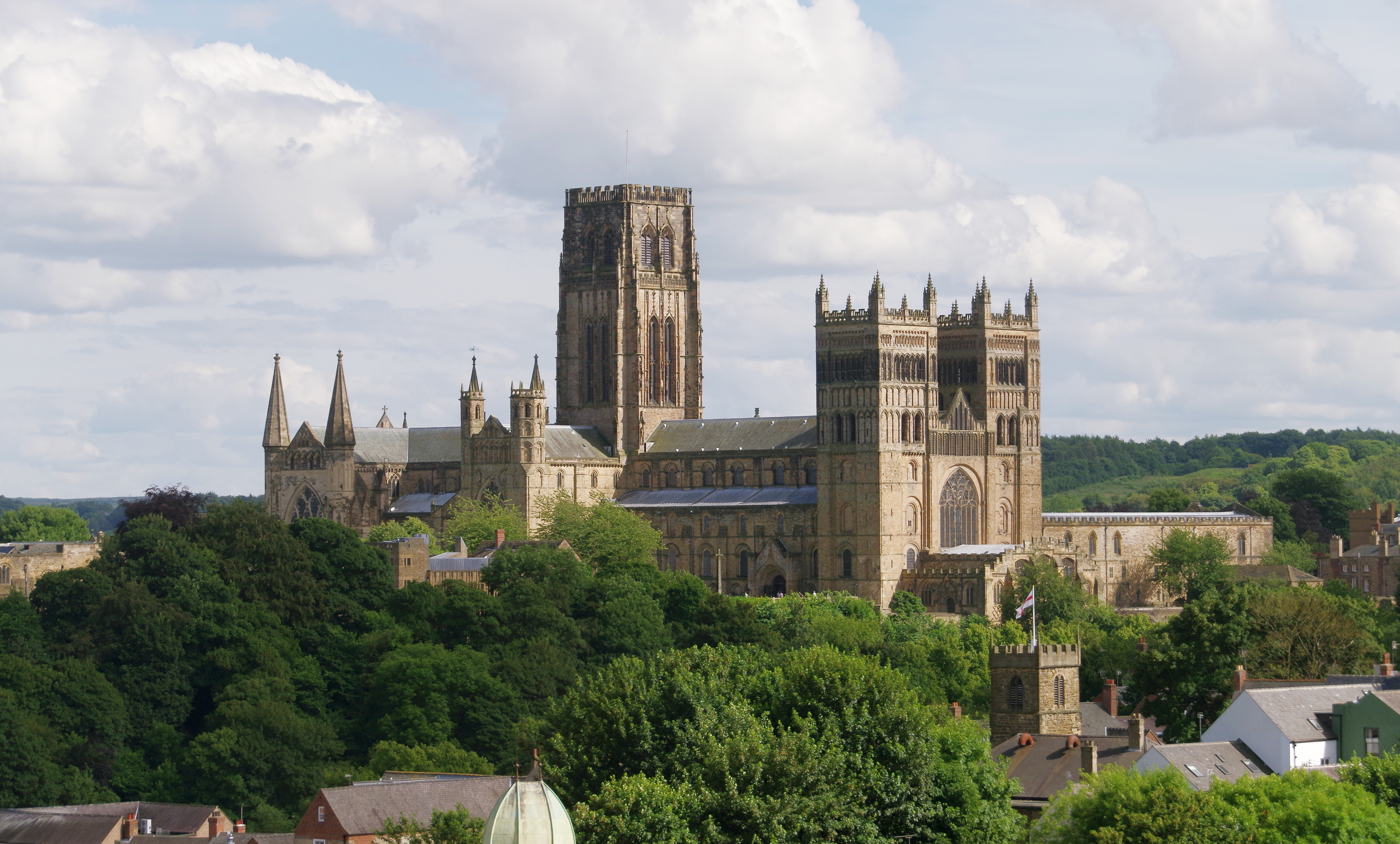
The cathedral of Durham

In 1093, he and Bishop William de St-Calais laid the foundation stone for what would later become Durham Cathedral.

=== Bishop of St Andrews and death ===
In 1107, the Prior was elected as bishop to the see of St Andrews which had been without a bishop since 1093. Consecration was delayed by ecclesiastical disputes between York and St Andrews, and did not take place until 1 August 1109. According to Symeon of Durham, he found that he could not exercise the office "worthily" as there was only a primitive reliquary church, no Benedictine monks to support him and conflicts between various factions he had to deal with, including the Scottish King Alexander, the Archbishop of York and the culdees, a local Scottish monastic community. Alexander asked Pope Paschal II to advice Turgot on these matters and the pope sent Turgot two letters as well as a book of excerpts of canon law to support him. Turgot, perhaps in response to these letters, proposed to go to Rome to speak directly with Pope Paschal II but Alexander prevented him from doing so.

Tugot became ill in June 1115 and was allowed to return to Durham where he had begun his clerical life, where he died on 31 August 1115. Turgot's last words were from Psalm 76 "His dwelling is in peace and his habitation in Sion" and he was buried in the chapter house of Durham next to the graves of other bishops. His mortuary roll, which may have been prepared by Symeon of Durham himself, circulated as far as the French counties of Anjou, Blois, Touraine and Vermandois.

== Notes ==
Religious titles
Preceded by Giric or Cathróe	Bishop of Cell Rígmonaid (Saint Andrews); 1107–1115	Succeeded by Eadmer

Catholic Church titles
Preceded by Aldwin (prior)	Prior of Durham; 1087–1109	Succeeded by Algar
