= Whittingehame =

Coordinates: 55.953°N 2.633°W

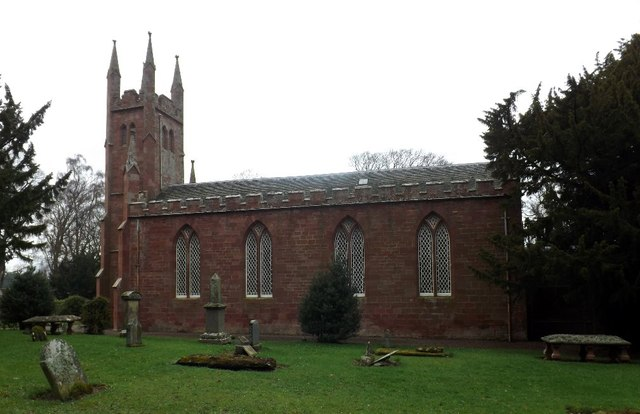
- Whittingehame Church, the south aspect

- Location within Scotland
- OS grid reference: NT604735
- Civil parish: Whittingehame
- Council area: East Lothian Council
- Lieutenancy area: East Lothian
- Country: Scotland
- Sovereign state: United Kingdom
- Post town: HADDINGTON
- Postcode district: EH41
- Dialling code: 01620
- Police: Scotland
- Fire: Scottish
- Ambulance: Scottish
- UK Parliament: East Lothian
- Scottish Parliament: East Lothian

Whittingehame is a parish with a small village in East Lothian, Scotland, about halfway between Haddington and Dunbar, and near East Linton. The area is on the slopes of the Lammermuir Hills. Whittingehame Tower dates from the 15th century and remains a residence.

The village is the birthplace and burial place of Prime Minister Arthur Balfour.

== Barony ==
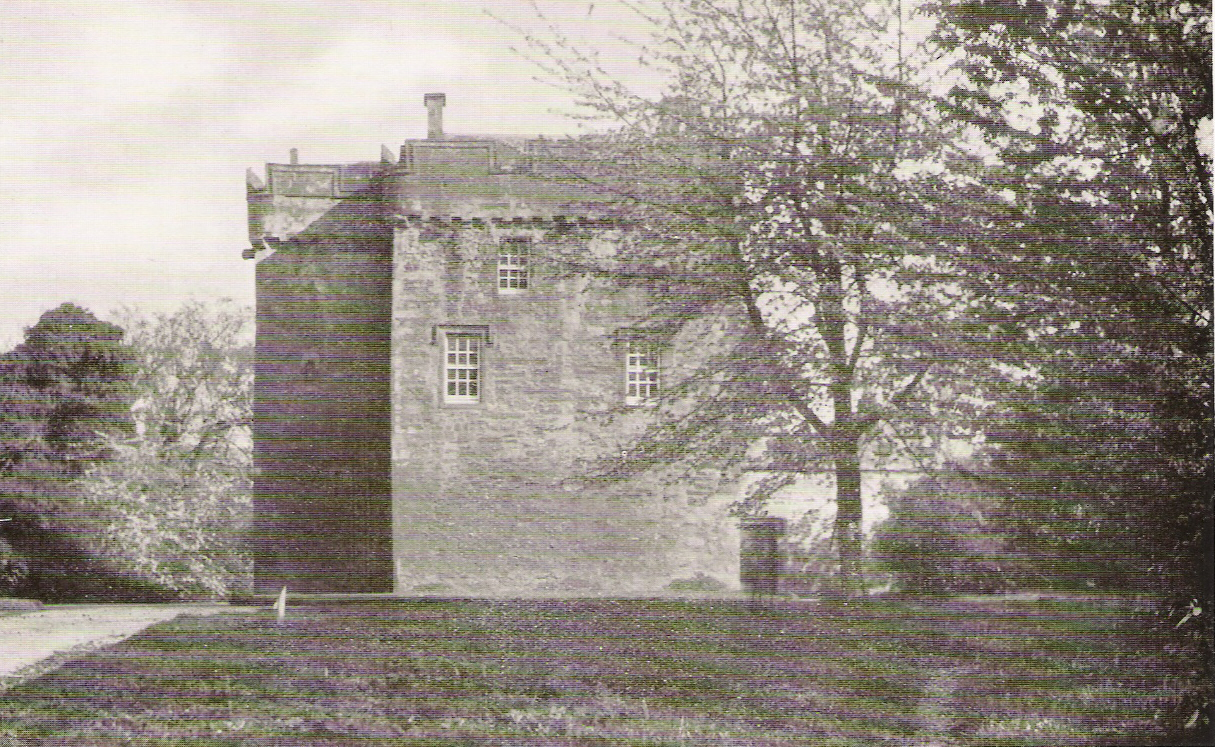
Whittinghame Tower

The barony was anciently the possession of the Dunbar Earls of March family, and Chalmers' Caledonia records that they held their baronial court there. In 1372 George de Dunbar, 10th Earl of March, gave in marriage with his sister Agnes to James Douglas of Dalkeith, the manor of Whittingehame, with the patronage of the chapel. The Douglases remained in possession for over 200 years: about 1537 Elizabeth (d. after August 1557), daughter of Sir Robert Lauder of The Bass (d. 1517/18), married William Douglas of Whittingehame, and in October 1564 Mary, Queen of Scots, confirmed to their son, William Douglas of Whittinghame (d. 17 December 1595), a Senator of the College of Justice, the barony of Whittingham, the castle, mills, and the avowson of the Church there, ratified by parliament on 19 April 1567. This William Douglas had married in 1566 Elizabeth (d. after 6 August 1608), daughter of Sir Richard Maitland of Lethington, a Senator of the College of Justice.

== Darnley and Riccio ==
It is said that the plot to murder Mary's husband, Lord Darnley, was discussed at length at Whittingehame castle in 1566, and in March of that year "William Douglas of Whittingehame, brother to Master Archibald Douglas parson of Douglas", is cited as one of those in the conspiracy to murder David Riccio. On 26 August 1582 William Douglas of Whittingehame is cited as one of the Ruthven raiders.

On 28 December 1630, Sir Archibald Douglas, 5th of Whittingehame, son and heir of the previous couple, was a witness to the baptism of Archibald Sydserf at Whittingehame Church, but by 1640 Sir Archibald was dead with no issue. Whittingehame passed to his brother Sir William Douglas of Stoneypath, near Garvald, whose daughter Isobel married, in 1628, Sir Arthur Douglas of the Kellour family, and their daughter Elizabeth (1632–1668) married, in 1652, Alexander Seton, 1st Viscount of Kingston and carried Whittingehame to him (Elizabeth's brother Archibald having died unmarried). Their youngest daughter Elizabeth, carried Whittingehame to her husband William Hay of Duns and Drumelzier, Peebleshire, upon their marriage in 1695. The Hays, as proprietors, were highly esteemed by their tenants.

In 1817 they sold Whittingehame and Stoneypath, near Garvald, to James Balfour, second son of John Balfour, 5th of Balbirnie in Fife, who had made a large fortune in India. James Balfour subsequently enlarged his estate by buying up a great many adjoining properties. By 1900 there were about 25 farms on the Whittingehame estate. The coal mines on their Fife lands greatly increased their prosperity throughout the 19th century.

== Whittingehame House ==
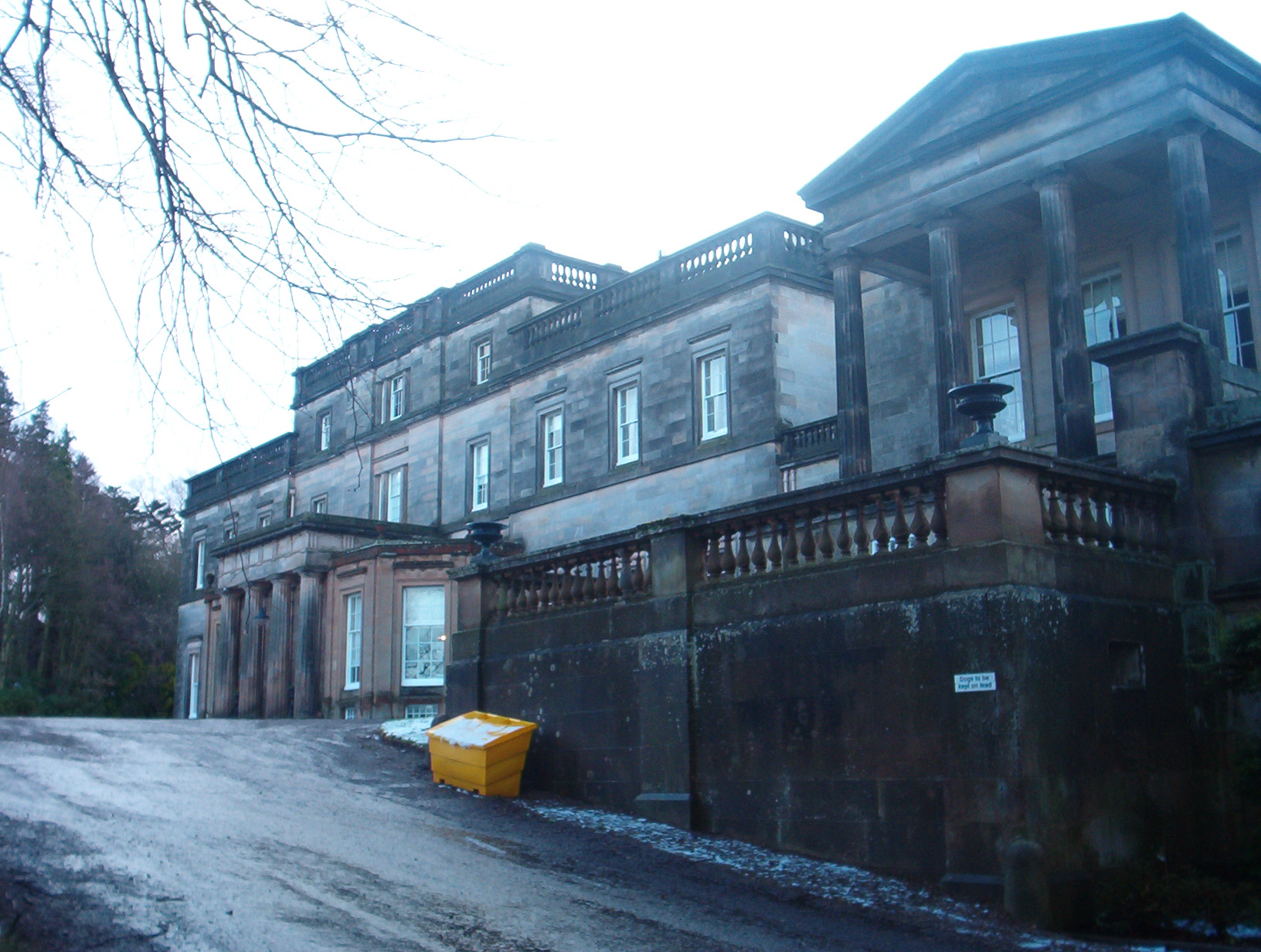
Whittingehame House

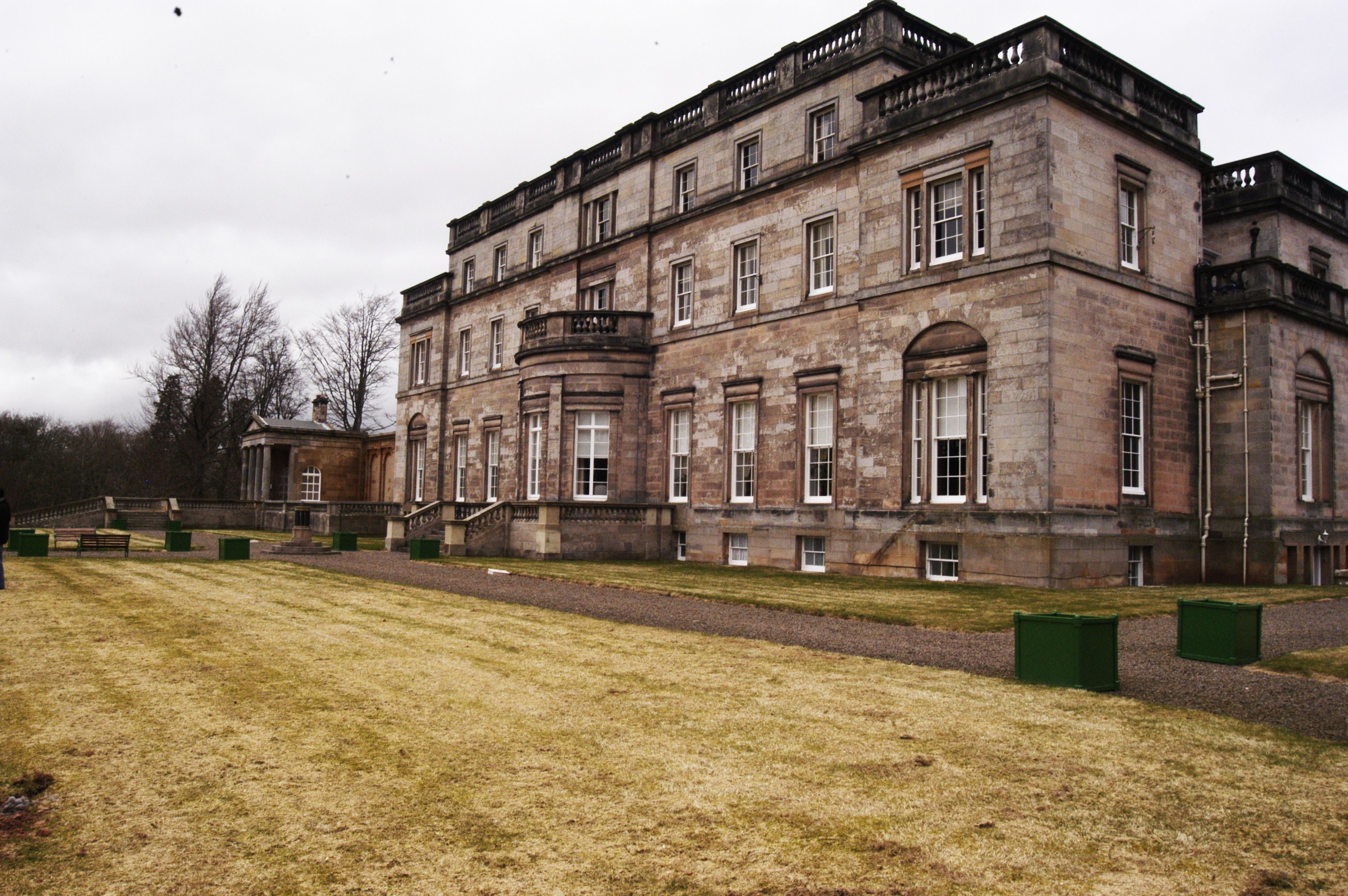
Whittingehame House (rear façade)

Designations

Listed Building – Category A
- Official name: Whittingehame House with Terrace Walls and Sundial
- Designated: 4 February 1971
- Reference no.: LB17485

Inventory of Gardens and Designed Landscapes in Scotland
- Official name: Whittingehame
- Designated: 30 June 1987
- Reference no.: GDL00385

James Balfour engaged James Dorward, from Haddington, to build a new neo-classical mansion and offices to designs by Sir Robert Smirke, Whittingehame House, completed about 1817, with additions and alterations by architect William Burn ten years later. This became the family home of the Balfours and the birthplace of the Prime Minister Arthur Balfour and the scientist Francis Maitland Balfour. Between 1939 and 1941, Whittingehame was converted into a school for Jewish refugee children coming to Britain through the Kindertransport. The school, known as the Whittingehame Farm School, sheltered 160 children between the ages of 7 and 17. This building, a huge country house and A-listed, still stands, albeit now divided into private apartments. It is not open to the public. Having passed through various hands after the Balfours (at one time it was a private school - Holt School, but it closed and the property lay dormant) there is still much of interest to see, including a spectacular ceiling to the dining room.

== Church and hamlet ==
A parochial school, of which the laird was patron, was long established at Whittingehame, and Mr James Hogg was appointed schoolmaster there in 1742; having transferred from neighbouring Morham.

In 1820, James Balfour rebuilt the church, supplanting the previous rebuild of 1722, and then established, in 1840, a new model village to the north-west of the former medieval settlement. It consists of a schoolhouse and a string of cottages, all in red sandstone.

The parish war memorial stands opposite the lane leading to the church and manse. It was unveiled by Arthur Balfour, Secretary of State, on 16 October 1921 and was dedicated by the local minister, Rev Marshall Lang.

From 1950 to 1955, it was a boarding school called "Whittingehame House School For Boys", then a few years later, it was used as a school called Holts Academy; which only lasted a few years. After that, it was sold off and converted to 3 or 4 apartments.

== Ghost legend ==
There is a folk legend that Whittinghame was once home to the ghost of an unbaptised child, who could not enter the afterlife because he had no name. One night the ghost was encountered by a drunk, who addressed him as 'Short-Hoggers'. The ghost, overjoyed at being given a name, was never seen again.

== See also ==
- List of places in East Lothian

== Bibliography ==
- Privy Council Registers for Scotland, pages 436-437/507.
- Reminiscence & Notices of Ten Parishes of the County of Haddington by John Martine, edited by E J Wilson, Haddington, 1894, 'Whittinghame' pps: 38–57.
- The Seven Ages of an East Lothian Parish - Whittingehame, by the Rev. Marshall B Lang, T.D., B.D., Minister of Whittingehame, with a foreword by Lady Frances Balfour, (1858–1931), Edinburgh, 1929.
