= Cathróe (bishop of the Scots) =

Cathróe is the twelfth alleged Bishop of St. Andrews according to the bishop-list of Walter Bower. He is one of 4 bishops-elect listed by Bower; that is, he is the second of Giric, Cathróe, Eadmer and Godric. As with the other 3, Bower is our only source. As the list is in chronological order, only Cathróe can have been bishop elect before Turgot of Durham was elected bishop in 1107, with Eadmer being bishop-elect in 1120 after the death of Turgot. It has been suggested too that Eadmer and Godric are the same people.

== Notes ==
Religious titles
Preceded by Giric	Bishop of St Andrews el. 1093x1107	Succeeded by Turgot of Durham
