= Garvald, East Lothian =

Coordinates: 55.929°N 2.658°W

Garvald: Scottish Gaelic: Garbh Allt; Scots: Garvit
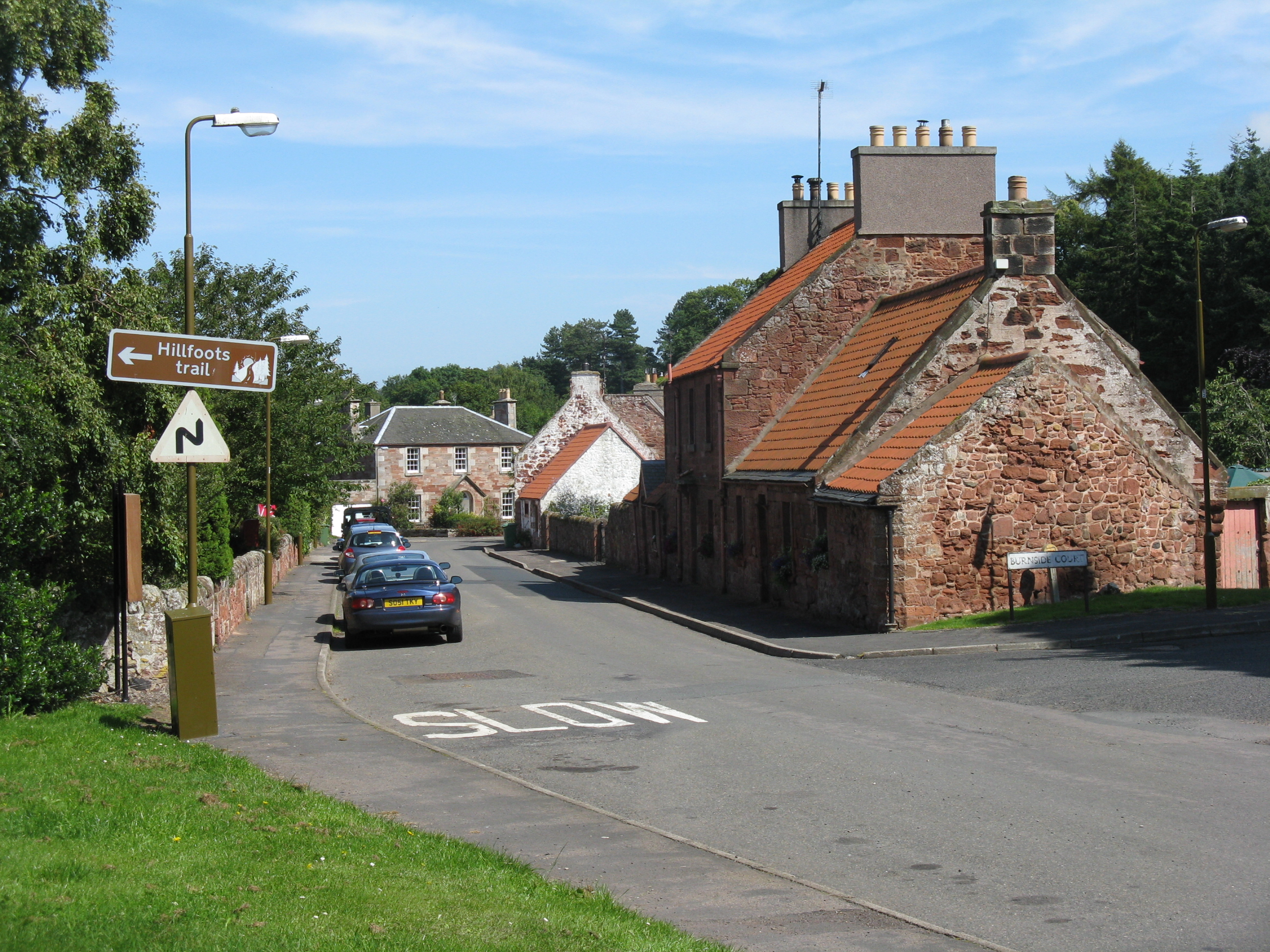
- The main street in Garvald

- Location within Scotland
- OS grid reference: NT588708
- Civil parish: Garvald and Bara
- Council area: East Lothian Council
- Lieutenancy area: East Lothian
- Country: Scotland
- Sovereign state: United Kingdom
- Post town: HADDINGTON
- Postcode district: EH41
- Dialling code: 01620
- Police: Scotland
- Fire: Scottish
- Ambulance: Scottish
- UK Parliament: East Lothian
- Scottish Parliament: East Lothian
- Website: garvald.org.uk

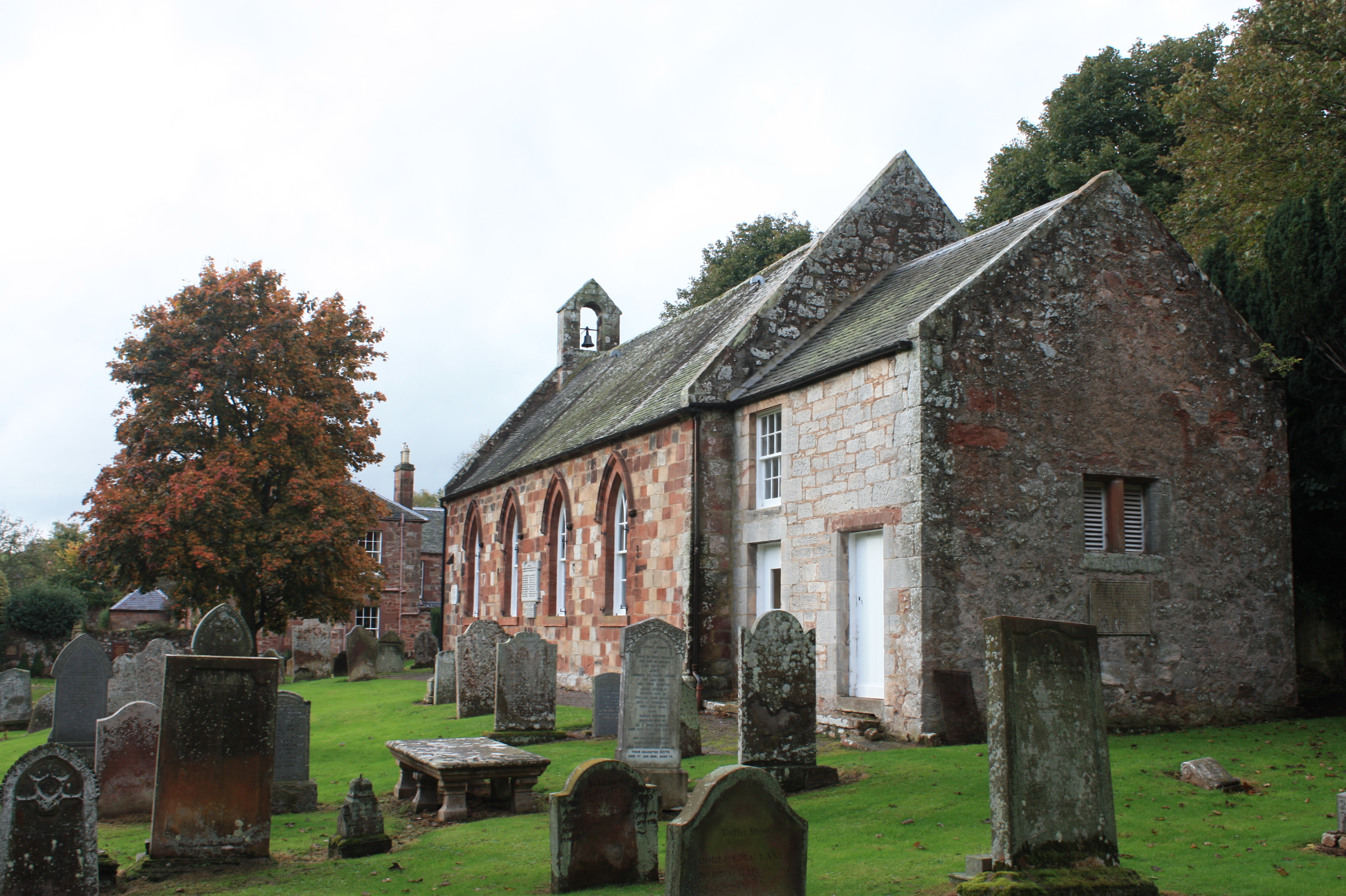
Garvald Parish Church

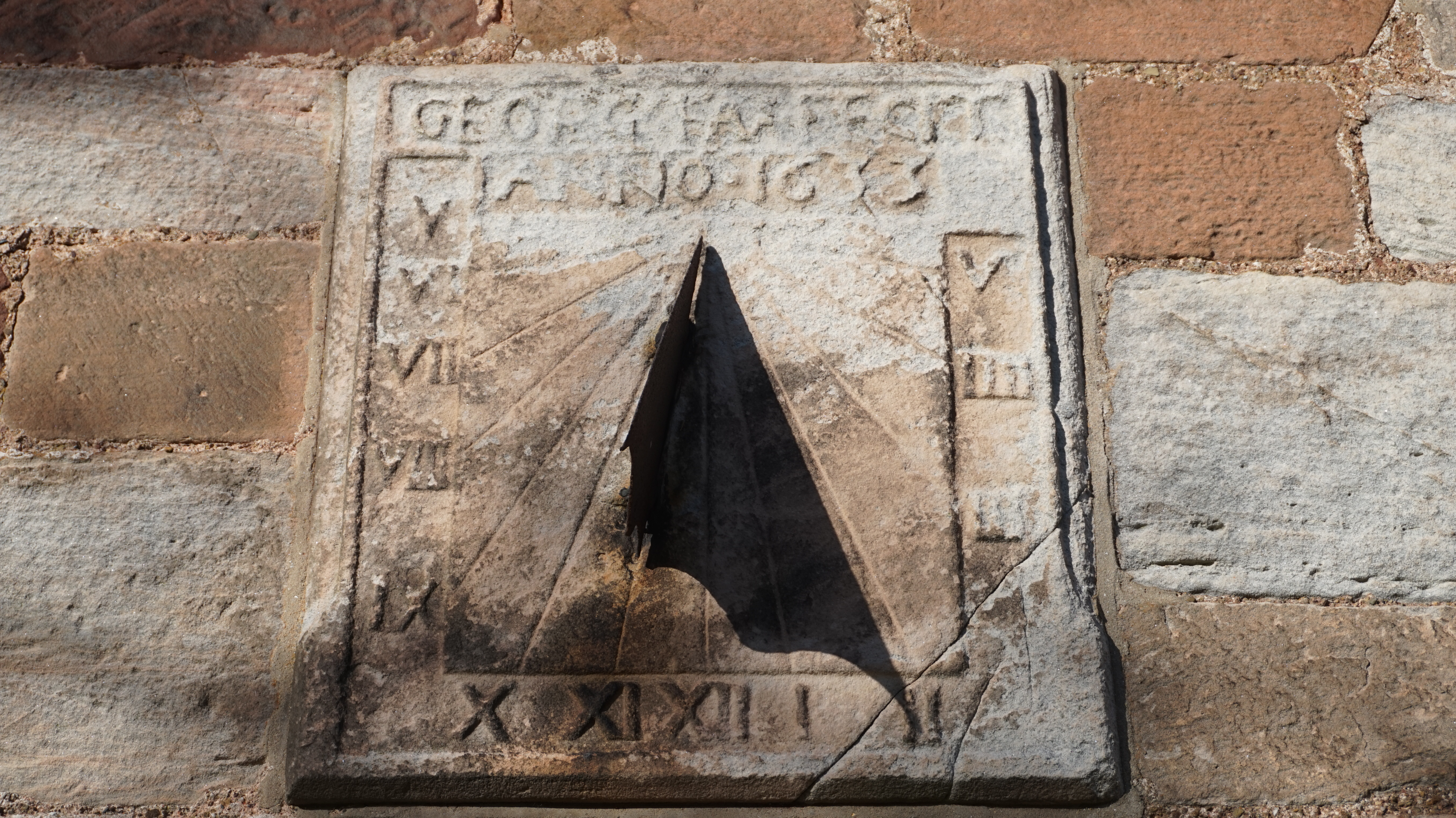
Sundial on wall of Garvald Parish Church

Garvald is a village south-east of Haddington in East Lothian, Scotland. It lies on the Papana Water south of the B6370, east of Gifford. The combined parish of Garvald and Bara, borders Whittingehame to the East, Morham to the North, Yester to the West, and Lauder to the South. It is mainly an agricultural parish. The red freestone once constantly mined in this parish was well known throughout the whole country.

== Etymology ==
The name Garvald may be derived from the Scottish Gaelic Garbh Allt, meaning "a rough burn or stream". A Brittonic origin is also possible, where the generic may be alt, "a steep height or hill, a cliff" (Welsh allt). The specifier may be either *garw, "rough, harsh, rugged, uncultivated", or a derivative of *gār, "a word" (perhaps adjectivally meaning "calling, crying, noisy"). Other like-named places in Southern Scotland may have the same origin.

== Village ==
The village sits upon a red sandstone formation, and lies in a narrow, well-sheltered hollow, or valley. The name of the stream upon which the village is situated, the Papana Water, appears to have been imported, given by nuns who came from Italy and settled down at nearby Nunraw. It abounds with small trout. The land rises very abruptly towards the Lammermuir Hills after the bridge across the Papana is crossed.

At one time there were two breweries, three public houses, besides bakers, tailors, weavers, shoemakers, blacksmiths, wrights, coopers, grocers, etc., in the village.

Oliver Cromwell's army camped overnight in this parish, near Danskine loch, during his march from Edinburgh to Dunbar. The local tradition is that they drank up all the beer found in the two breweries.

The kirk, and manse (1820), are situated at the eastern end of the village. The north-west corner of the church is 12th century; the south wall has a sundial upon it dated 1633, and the north aisle is of 1677. In 1829 the contractor (and possibly the designer) John Swinton, from Haddington, completely remodelled the church in 1829, which included four Gothic windows and the Western belfry.

The Rector of Garvald in 1504 was Master Patrick Coventrie, who held a BA in Theology.

The gabled former school, and school house, of circa 1845 have survived, although now private residences. The school closed in 1971, with local children attending Yester Primary School in Gifford since then. Behind the former school is a plain kirk of about the same date (now the communally owned Village Hall) with a later tower and slated spire. There is a small village green. The rows of cottages date from at least the 18th century, with later additions.

In the Cold War, Garvald was the site of an underground Royal Observer Corps Monitoring Post, still extant and situated in a field only a few metres from a public footpath.

== Proprietors ==
Stoneypath Tower in February 1999. It has now been fully restored

Stoneypath Tower, although in the parish of Whittingehame, stands on the verge of Garvald parish, on a high perpendicular freestone cliff, below which the Papana runs. Stoneypath was the ancient seat of the Lyle family and their Arms still adorn the tower. Henry the Minstrel's Actis and Deids of Wallace mentions "Squeir Lyle" and Sir Robert Lauder of The Bass assisting Wallace in pursuit of the Earl of Dunbar in 1297. In a charter granted to Sir Robert Lyle of Duchale, who was created a Lord of Parliament by James II about 1446, George Lyle of Stoneypath is mentioned after the uncle of Sir Robert as one of the heirs male. A George Lyle of Stonypath was still in occupation in 1506. Stoneypath eventually passed to the Douglas of Whittinghame family. Ruinous for the last two centuries, Stoneypath was completely restored/rebuilt at the beginning of the 21st century and is once again a residence.

The Lauder of The Bass family also long held the superiority of 364 acres (14 husbandlands) at Garvald. In 1495, at Edinburgh, Robert Lawder was granted Sasine of the superiority of Stenton, Garvald, and The Bass. Acta Dominorum Concilii records a dispute in 1501 between Jonet, prioress of the Convent of Haddington, and Sir Robert Lauder of The Bass, knight, regarding the lands and chapellany of Garvald. At Edinburgh on the 29 April 1519, his son, also Robert Lauder of The Bass (d. June 1576), was granted Sasine of a long list of superiorities following the death of his father, amongst which was "the lands of Garvald", which he eventually gave a feu of to his son, Patrick Lauder of Garvald (d. before April 1588). Both father and son took part in the Battle of Langside in support of Mary, Queen of Scots. The last Lauder laird of The Bass, George (b.1597), appears to have parted with this property about 1640.

In 1890 the proprietors in Garvald parish were: the Marquess of Tweeddale, the Earl of Wemyss, Arthur James Balfour of Whittingehame, Walter W Gray of Nunraw, and Robert Edgar of Linplum & Bara.

In 1967 the Rosslyn Stud moved to Garvald Grange where Margaret Runcie bred prize-winning ponies.

== See also ==
- Garvald, Scottish Borders
- Garvald, South Lanarkshire
