= Whittingehame Farm School =

School for Jewish refugee children in East Lothian, Scotland (1939–41)

Whittingehame Farm School operated from 1939 to 1941, and was at Whittingehame, near the village of Stenton, in East Lothian, Scotland. The school was a shelter for Jewish children seeking refuge in Britain, as part of the Kindertransport mission.

Whittingehame was the estate of the Earl of Balfour and had been the property of Arthur Balfour (1848–1930), former Prime Minister of the United Kingdom and author of the Balfour Declaration, which gave British support to the creation in Palestine of a national home for the Jewish people. The school opened in January 1939. Balfour's nephew Viscount Traprain arranged to take in initially 69 Jewish refugee children. With the financial support, principally, of the Edinburgh Jewish community, and aid from the local Christian community and the Balfour family, the home eventually accommodated 160 children. The home was set up as a Zionist school to teach agricultural techniques to the children in anticipation that they would settle in Palestine after the war.

The school was closed in 1941 due to financial issues, and because many of the children were older than 17. The young people were absorbed into the British economy. A large number of the Jewish children volunteered and served, some with distinction, in the British Army during World War II.

British restrictions on the Kindertransport children were harsh. Kindertransport refugees had to be younger than 17 and no adult family members were permitted to accompany the children to Britain. Most of the children's families were murdered in the Holocaust. After the war, many of the Whittingehame Farm School refugees emigrated to Palestine.
