= Margaret Runcie =

Pony breeder (1925–2022)

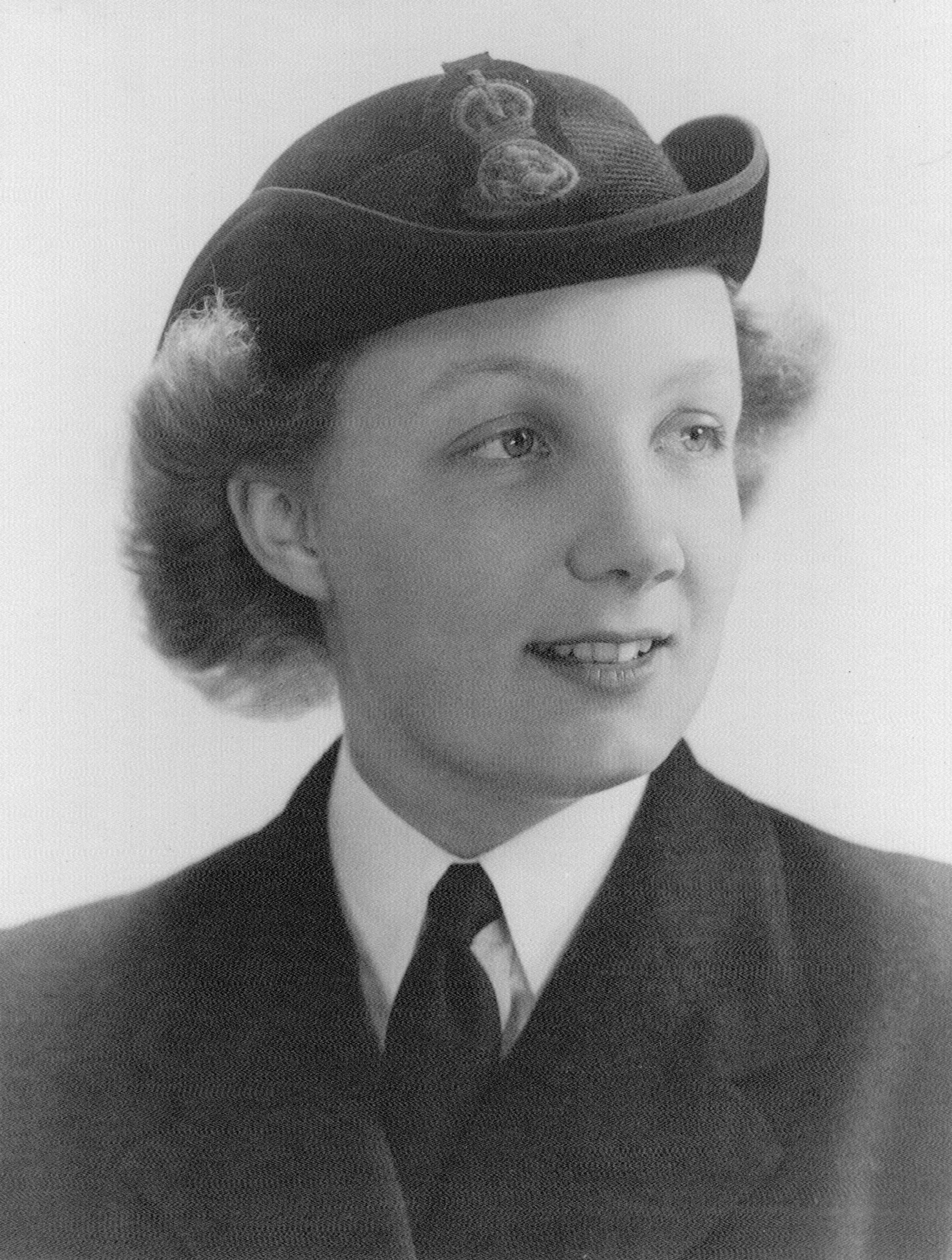
- in the Wrens until 1946
- Born: Margaret Mary Power; 19 October 1925; Hatfield
- Died: 23 December 2022 (aged 97)
- Education: Reading University; Columbia University
- Occupation: Breeding ponies
- Known for: Winning at the Royal Highland Show
- Spouse: Ken Runcie OBE

Margaret Runcie born Margaret Mary Power (19 October 1925 – 23 December 2022) was a Scottish-based pony breeder who won 18 Gold Medals at the Royal Highland Show.

== Life ==
Runcie was born in Hatfield in Hertfordshire in 1925. She was known as "Midge" because of her size when she was a child. Her middle-class parents allowed her to use a trap pulled by "Buddy" the donkey. Her mother got her riding their donkey by the age of three and she later joined the Enfield Chace Pony Club.

Her early education was shaped by the second world war as she left school to look after hounds before she joined the Wrens. It was not until the end of 1946 that she left the naval service. She went to Reading University to study Dairy Animal Science.

She worked for the National Agricultural Advisory Service until her application for a scholarship was successful. She met her husband Ken Runcie on board the Queen Mary as she sailed to New York to take a master's degree at Columbia University.

In 1958 she founded the Rosslyn Stud it was based on a farm in Roslin owned by Edinburgh University. Her husband Ken was the farm manager. Her stud was built around her purchase of a mare named Elizabeth Arden which she had bought during a phonecall with the owner. This bloodline was going to be the basis of four decade of breeding. In 1960 Elizabeth Arden won a gold medal at the Royal Highland Show and this was awarded by the Queen and Prince Philip, Duke of Edinburgh. This pony and notably her foals, Rosslyn Personality (born 1965) and Rosslyn Sweet Talk (born 1966) had child-friendly temperaments and fine legs. These were to be the basis of the 18 gold medals won by Runcie and the Rosslyn Stud.

From 1961 she was the secretary of the Scottish Committee of the National Pony Society which she founded with two friends to improve the support for native breeds in Scotland.

Runcie was recognised in Scotland for her achievements.

Runcie died in December 2022.
