= Giric (bishop of the Scots) =

Alleged eleventh Bishop of St Andrews

Giric, if he is the Gregorius of Walter Bower, is the eleventh alleged Bishop of St Andrews. This Gregorius is mentioned in the bishop-list of Walter Bower as the successor of Bishop Fothad II. Bower's most recent editors commented that "there is no evidence to prove that any bishop of St Andrews was consecrated between 1093 and 1109". In the late 1990s, the University of Glasgow historian Dauvit Broun, by looking through the manuscripts afresh, recovered the previously unknown last 20% of Version-A of the St. Andrews Foundation Legend, a text composed at the turn of the 11th and 12th centuries. In it, a few of the contemporary church's leading men are named, and one of these is "Archbishop Giric".

It is known that Turgot of Durham was elected to the bishopric in 1107, and so Giric may have been in office anytime between 1093, the death-date of his predecessor, and 1107. Bower's list has Giric as one of four bishops who died as "bishops-elect" between the episcopates of Fothad II and Turgot. The other "bishops-elect" were men called Cathróe, Eadmer and Godric.

== Notes ==
Religious titles
Preceded by Fothad II	Bishop of St Andrews (elect?) bp. 1093x1107	Succeeded by Cathróe? / Turgot of Durham?
