= Old Cambus =

Coordinates: 55.91°N 02.32°W

- Location within the Scottish Borders
- OS grid reference: NT8069
- Council area: Scottish Borders
- Country: Scotland
- Sovereign state: United Kingdom
- Police: Scotland
- Fire: Scottish
- Ambulance: Scottish
- UK Parliament: Berwickshire, Roxburgh and Selkirk
- Scottish Parliament: Ettrick, Roxburgh and Berwickshire

Old Cambus is a village in the Scottish Borders, Scotland. St. Helens church, which is now a ruin served the area.

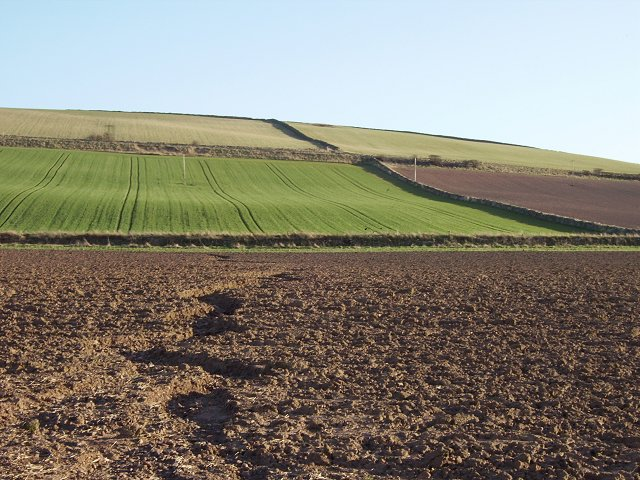
Farmland, Penmanshiel Moor, nr Old Cambus
