= Old Pentland Cemetery =

Burial ground in Scotland

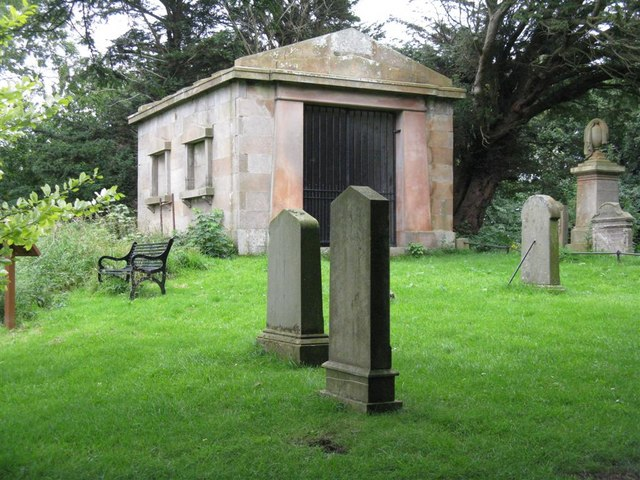
- The Gibsone Mausoleum
- Interactive map of Old Pentland Cemetery

Details
- Established: Early 17th century
- Location: Midlothian
- Country: Scotland
- Coordinates: 55.884622°N 3.180572°W
- Type: Scottish/Christian

Old Pentland Cemetery is a cemetery in Old Pentland, near Loanhead in Midlothian, Scotland. A category B listed building, the cemetery dates back to the early 17th century.

The cemetery contains the remains of members of the Covenanter movement who died during the Battle of Rullion Green in 1666. The Gibsone burial vault was built in 1839 to designs by the architect Thomas Hamilton, and there is an 18th-century watch house, used to guard against body snatchers. There are several medieval cross-slabs in the cemetery.

The burial ground lies on the site of Pentland Parish Church, built in the 13th century and used for worship until the parishes of Pentland and Lasswade united in 1647. The cemetery was still in active use in 1907, although the church had long since vanished.
