= Morham =

Coordinates: 55.94438°N 2.71245°W

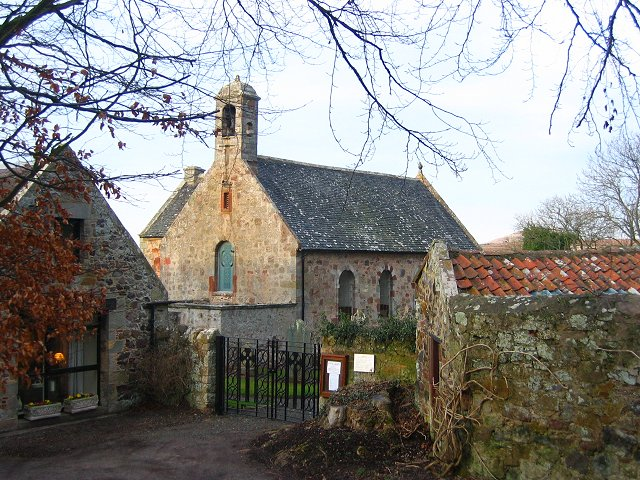
Morham Church - geograph.org.uk - 141238

Morham, East Lothian, sometimes spelt Moram, Morum, or Morhame in old records, is the smallest (agricultural) parish in Scotland, sandwiched between five other parishes: Haddington, Garvald, Yester, Whittingehame, and Prestonkirk, in the undulating lower reaches of the Lammermuir Hills.

== Church and hamlet ==
The village, once a few hundred yards south of the church, has vanished. The first notice of the church is as a prebend in 1481, although a charter of Bara in 1340 is witnessed by a "'Lord' William, Rector of the parish of Morham". In April 1532 Mr. Robert Hoppringill was parson of Moreham (NAS - GD150/710). The present building of 1724 replaced a church of 1685 and stands in a secluded hollow in a very neat walled burial ground. The Dalrymple loft and mausoleum of circa 1730 are an imposing feature on its north side. A walled garden separates the church from the 1827 manse. The Statistical Account of Haddingtonshire (Edinburgh 1841) states that the earliest date in the Parochial Records is 22 February 1712. However, there is also a gap in the Morham Old Parish registers from late in 1714 until 1720. There was at Morham a parochial school very early on, and a James Hogg was schoolmaster there until 1742, when he took up a new appointment at Whittingehame.

== Morham tower ==
For centuries, a small castle or Tower house stood opposite the church but there are scant remains of it today. James Hepburn, 4th Earl of Bothwell was at Morham in April 1565. On 31 October 1580, hearing he would be arrested for the murder of Lord Darnley, Archibald Douglas escaped from Morham, the house of his wife Jean Hepburn, at midnight to England. The house was then occupied by Alexander Hume of Manderston, and kept by his son, Alexander Home, Prior of Coldingham.

The English ambassador Robert Bowes noted in July 1591 that Sir William Keith of Delny "lay in bed" once or twice at Morham with the owner, the rebellious Francis Stewart, 1st Earl of Bothwell. In June 1592 James VI sent Sir John Carmichael and James Sandilands to Morham to arrest Bothwell, but they only found a horse belonging to one of his friends.

== Feudal superiors: Owners ==
The feudal superiors of Morham changed over the centuries. Most of the parish had been possessed by the Hepburn family: the Earls of Bothwell, and the Hepburns of Bearford. The two largest farms were Northrig and Mainshill, and William Sinclare de Northrig appears as the first witness to a charter signed at Samuelstown, Haddingtonshire, on 29 October 1497. The 3rd Earl of Bothwell married, in 1533 or 1534, Agnes Sinclair. He divorced her within a decade and as part of his settlement, Lord Bothwell gave her a charter of the lands of Morham. She was styled Lady Morham and lived in the tower house at Morham for the rest of her life. She died in 1573 and her testament is headed "Dame Agnes Sinclair, Countess of Bothwell and Lady Morehame".

On 8 October 1573, a Tack was made to Agnes Sinclair's daughter, Dame Jean (or Jane) Hepburne, Mistress of Caithness, of the lands and barony of Morham with the mill of Morham, the lands of Mainshill, Pleuchfield, the Briad meadow, the feu mails of the Northrig and all other mails, ferms, profits and duties in the constabulary of Haddington, sheriffdom of Edinburgh which pertained to the deceased Dame Agnes Sinclair, Lady Morham, and fell to the Scottish Crown through the conviction in Parliament and forfeiture for treason of the 4th Earl of Bothwell, son and heir apparent of the said Dame Agnes, for 'the space and termes of ane yeir and farder induring oure will nixt and immediatlie follow and hir entre thairto, which entre was at the deceis of the said Dame Agnes Sinclair', for a yearly payment of £100 from Martinmas next, 'and als payand and deliverand all and sundrie the annuellis awand furth of the said lands....to thame that richt hes thairto as law will.' This Jane Hepburn's third husband was the notorious Archibald Douglas, Parson of Douglas, who escaped from her tower house at Morham just prior to his intended arrest for his part in the murder of Lord Darnley.

The Statistical Account of Haddington states that the superiority of Mainshill had belonged to the 4th Earl of Bothwell (who briefly became the 1st Duke of Orkney in 1567), as part of the barony of Morham which he also possessed. He was the superior in October 1559, but upon his forfeiture Mainshill passed to Francis, 5th Earl of Bothwell. Lord Bothwell was forfeited in 1593, and the superiority of Mainshill went to Scott of Buccleuch. The Hepburns, however, continued to hold it by feu charter.

== Lauder family ==
The Lauder of The Bass family had long connections with Morham: in a charter or "an instrument" dated June 23, 1547 Thomas Sinclair in Northrig, Clerk to the Diocese of St.Andrews, was recorded as servitor to Robert Lauder of Bass. A few months later, in the Protocol Book of James Harlaw 1547 - 1585, there is an Instrument of August 10, 1547, where Thomas Sinclair of Northrig again acted as Procurator for Robert Lauder of The Bass. Also, with the earlier demise of the Knights Templar, their two Temple-lands in Morham passed to an earlier Sir Robert Lauder of The Bass, and remained in that family's possession until their incorporation in a charter of the new Barony of Drem for Thomas Hamilton, Lord Bynning, Secretary of Scotland, confirmed at Edinburgh 30 July 1614, wherein it is recorded that the Temple-lands at Morham (and others at Tyninghame) were "previously possessed by the Lord of The Bass". These temple-lands continued, however, to be feued to the Lauder family and Sir Harry Lauder's direct ancestors were farming them, as well as Northrig, which they held from Hepburn of Bearford, in that century and the next.

== Post Civil War ==
On 21 April 1659, Patrick Hepburn of Smeaton was served heir of his father, John Hepburn of Smeaton, in a long list of properties which included "the lands of Mainshill within the toune and territorie of Morhame." The Cess-Book of 1667 gives the proprietors of Morham Parish as (Esther, wife of James Hepburn) Lady Bearford, Alexander Seton, 1st Viscount of Kingston (who had held Tantallon Castle against Oliver Cromwell), Patrick Hepburn of Beanston, and James Cockburn.

In a Haddingtonshire Sasine registered on the 8 August 1792, No.576, Francis Charteris, 7th Earl of Wemyss was seised in the barony of Newmilns, or Amisfield, Haddingtonshire, plus half of the barony of Morham and its lands, plus the grain mill of the monastery of Haddington called Abbey Mill.

In the parish of Morham in 1841 the superior/proprietor of Northrig and Mainshill farms was Lord Wemyss; Morham Kirkhall and Mains to Robert Ainslie of Redcoll; James Aitcheson, Esq., of West Morham, and George Carstairs of Morham Bank.

== Ancient right-of-way ==
The people of Garvald and the general public once had a right to travel with carts &c., to and from Haddington, &c., by an old road through the Hagg's Muir, on the farms of Northrig and West Bearford in Morham parish. The road entered on the south side at Loanhead and came out on the north side opposite Stabstan Loan, on the farm of Easter Monkrigg, a little way east of Monkrigg East Gate on Seggarsdean road. Along this route the red and white freestone from Garvald quarries was carried on hand-barrows to build the old Collegiate church of Haddington.

== Today ==
With the demise of agricultural labour the population of the parish declined, the village vanished, and in 1957 the parish was amalgamated with that of neighbouring Garvald & Bara. The small village school closed in 1968 and since then, local children have attended Yester Primary School in Gifford.
