= Fothad II =

Fothad II was the bishop of St Andrews (1059–1093) for most of the reign of King Máel Coluim III mac Donnchada (reigned 1058–1093). Alternative spellings include Fodhoch, Fothach and Foderoch, and Fothawch (by Andrew of Wyntoun). A "Modach filius Malmykel" is mentioned in a grant, dated 1093, as the bishop of S. Andrews. As this bishop is certainly Fothad II, his father was a man named Máel Míchéil.

According to Andrew of Wyntoun, Fothad performed the marriage ceremony between King Máel Coluim and the woman who would be his second wife, Margaret. An early 12th-century cleric of York claimed that Fothad, on the instructions of Queen Margaret, had submitted to the Archbishop of York, although modern historians are usually inclined to doubt this.

He was influential enough for his death in 1093 to be noticed by the Annals of Ulster, which calls him "Fothud ardepscop Alban" (i.e. "Fothad, High Bishop [Archbishop?] of Scotland").

His immediate successor, according to the bishop list of Walter Bower, was Giric; but the next consecrated bishop we know about from other sources is Turgot. The obvious question is, did the bishopric really lie vacant for a decade and a half, did Bower or his source invent Giric, or did Giric actually succeed? The former options hardly seem probable in the context.

== Notes ==
Religious titles
Preceded by Túathal	Bishop of St Andrews; 1059?–1093	Succeeded by Giric
