= Stoneypath Tower =

Coordinates: 55.933409°N 2.64854°W

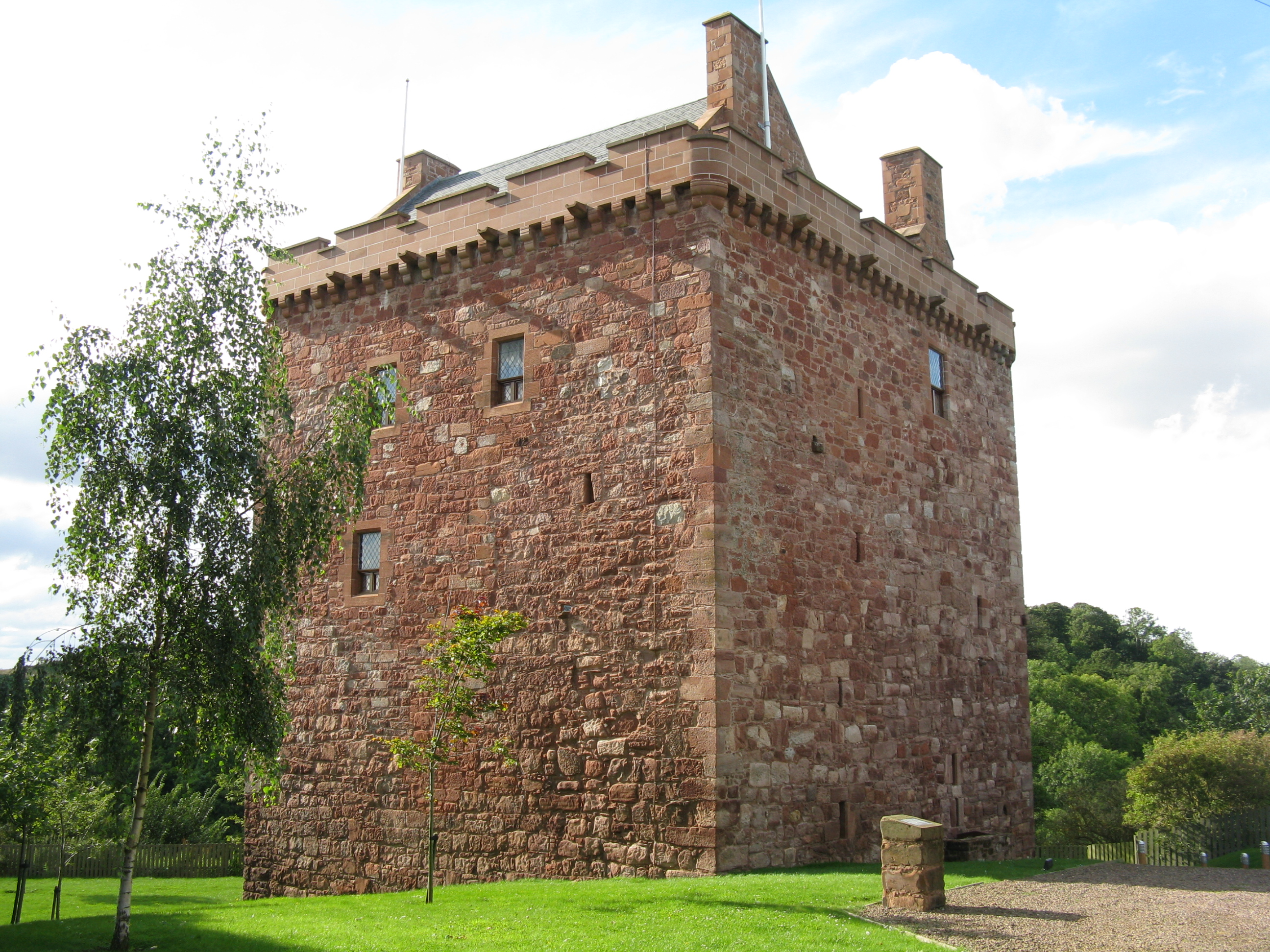
- Stoneypath Tower following restoration
- Interactive map of the Stoneypath Tower area

General information
- Location: East Lothian, Scotland
- Completed: 16th century

Stoneypath Tower is an L-plan tower house dating from the late sixteenth century, about 3.5 miles (5.6 km) south of East Linton, and east of the Whittinghame Water in East Lothian, Scotland.

== History ==
Stoneypath Tower was at first a property of the Lyles, but passed thereafter in succession to the Hamiltons of Innerwick, the Douglases of Whittinghame, and the Setons. At some stage it may have been blown up. By the later 19th century the building was in ruins, though in the early 21st century it was fully restored.

== Structure ==
The tower stands on a promontory defended by steep slopes on three sides. It may include part of a keep built in the previous century. The original entrance, approached by an external stair, has been sealed. A turnpike stair reached all floors. On the second floor was the hall. The thickness of the wall enclosed a prison. The keep is built of rubble, with some freestone dressings. There were originally three storeys. The wing contained two chambers.

== See also ==
- List of places in East Lothian
- List of places in Scotland
