= Bara, East Lothian =

Coordinates: 55.918°N 2.699°W

Bara: Scottish Gaelic: Baro
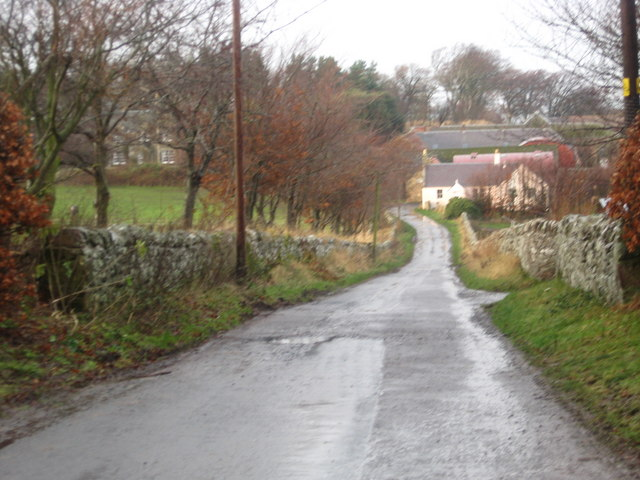
- Lane leading to Baro Farm in East Lothian

- Location within Scotland
- OS grid reference: NT563696
- Council area: East Lothian Council
- Lieutenancy area: East Lothian
- Country: Scotland
- Sovereign state: United Kingdom
- Post town: HADDINGTON
- Postcode district: EH41
- Dialling code: 01620
- Police: Scotland
- Fire: Scottish
- Ambulance: Scottish
- UK Parliament: East Lothian
- Scottish Parliament: East Lothian

Bara, anciently spelt Baro, is an agricultural parish in East Lothian, Scotland, which adjoins the parish of Garvald to the east, and Lauder across the Lammermuir Hills. It is south-west of Haddington.

About 1340, Robert de Lawder, Justiciary, was a witness, with James Lord Douglas, Robert de Keith, Henry St.Clair, Alexander de Seaton, all knights, plus the "Lord" William, Rector of the parish of Morham, East Lothian, to a charter of Euphemia, the widow of Sir John Giffard, Lord of Yester, relating to the tenement of land of 'Barow'.

This was once a separate community and parish, with its own church and graveyard, which stood in a corner of Linplum farm – to this day called kirk field. In 1743, part of the roof of the ancient church collapsed. The community was in some decline and the Presbytery decided not to repair the church but to conjoin the parish with adjoining Garvald, notwithstanding the fact that Morham church was slightly closer. The Glebe was on the north side of the road leading to Garvald and the manse stood where, in 1890, the Bara blacksmith's premises stood. The superiority of the parish was long in the hands of the Hays of Yester family and their cadets, and following the demise of Bara Kirk, Robert Hay, of Bara & Linplum, enclosed the churchyard with a wall and planted it with trees and shrubs. Some of the church ruins are extant and just a few of the original headstones in the totally overgrown graveyard. Some of the older headstones were readable in the 19th century and half a dozen appear in John Martine's book. Others were transcribed in the 1950s.

The community has today all but disappeared with the demise of agricultural labour, although numerous farms still exist: Carfrae, Duncanlaw, Bara, Linplum, Snawdon, Little Newton, Quarryford, Newlands, Castlemains, Danskin, Brokside, and East & West Hopes.
