= Eadmer =

Medieval English historian and theologian

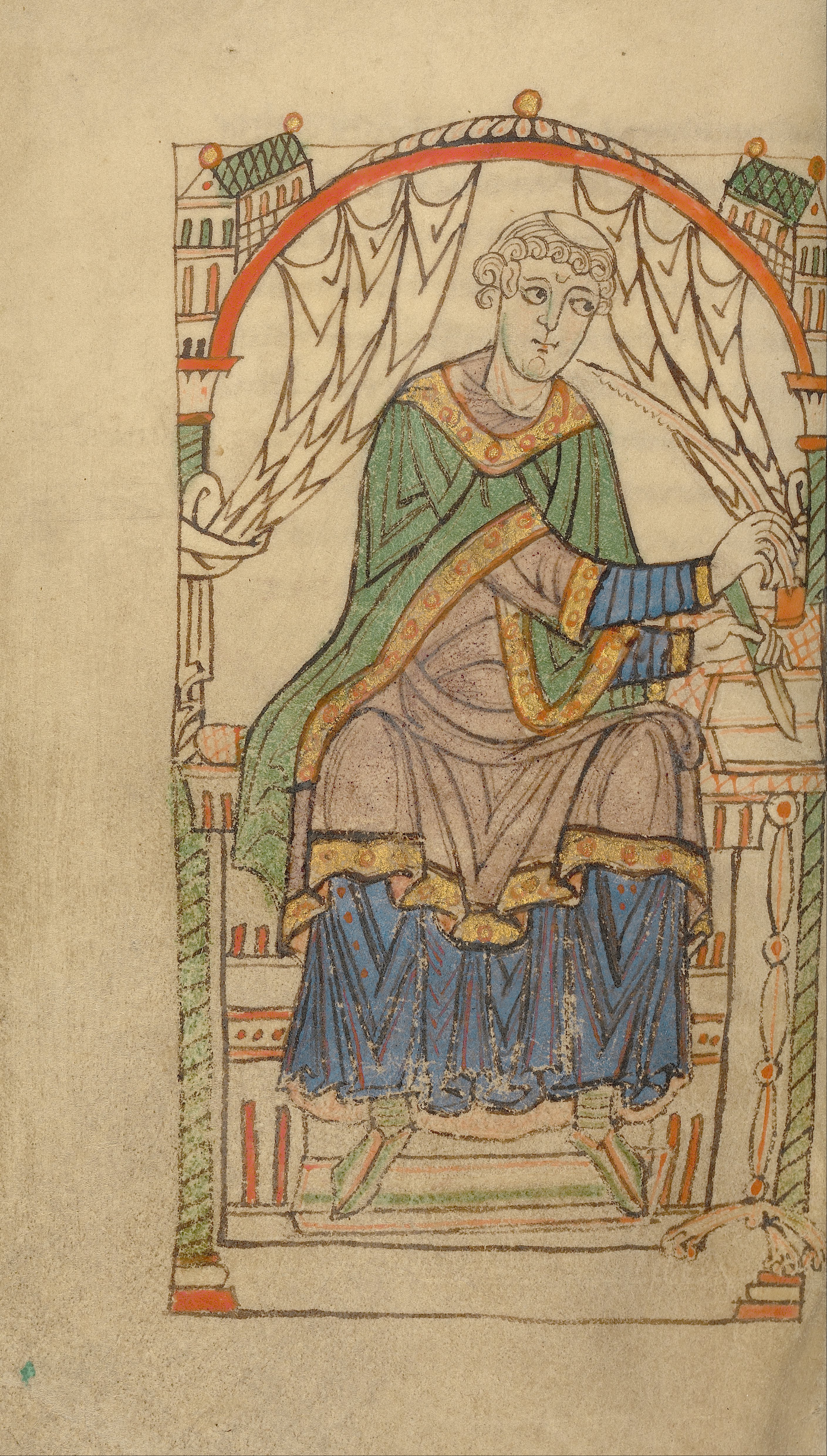
Miniature (about 1140–1150)

Eadmer or Edmer (/ˈɛdmər/; c. 1060 – c. 1126), also known as Eadmer of Canterbury OSB (Latin: Eadmerus Cantuariensis) was an English historian, theologian, and ecclesiastic. He is known for being a contemporary biographer of his archbishop and companion, Saint Anselm, in his Vita Anselmi, and chronicler in his Historia novorum in Anglia, which presents the public face of Anselm. Eadmer's history is written to support the primacy of the see of Canterbury over York, a central concern for Anselm.

== Life ==
Eadmer was born of Anglo-Saxon parentage, shortly before the Norman conquest of England in 1066. He became a monk in the Benedictine monastery of Christ Church, Canterbury, where he made the acquaintance of Anselm, at that time visiting England as abbot of the Abbey of Bec. The intimacy was renewed when Anselm became archbishop of Canterbury in 1093; afterward Eadmer was not only Anselm's disciple, but also his friend and director, being formally appointed to this position by Pope Urban II. In 1120 he was nominated to the bishopric of St. Andrews (Cell Rígmonaid), but as the Scots would not recognize the authority of the see of Canterbury he was never consecrated, and soon afterwards he resigned his claim to the bishopric. His death is accepted as during or after 1126.

== Legacy ==
Eadmer must be credited with influencing the spread of the doctrine of the Immaculate Conception of the Blessed Virgin Mary in the West when he defended popular traditions in his De Conceptione sanctae Mariae. The origins of the dogma lay in the East and had been long-established in Greece, and in Byzantine Italy where many Greek rite monasteries were founded prior to the Norman conquest of southern Italy, whence the festival likely spread across Western Europe first via English contact with monks in Italy. The idea began to gain currency in England in the opening decades of the 11th Century and had become the subject of liturgical veneration and a feast day (8 or 9 December) at Winchester, Canterbury, Exeter, and Worcester by about 1030. The feast had been discarded by Lanfranc in his reorganization of the liturgical calendar after the Conquest and Eadmer's advocacy of a sinless Mary was probably motivated as much by the restoration of local Anglo-Saxon devotions at Canterbury as with the wider propagation of the doctrine. Eadmer's writings equating popular Marian devotion with Englishry gave voice to English common folk, who venerated Mary as a patron saint: Immaculate Mary as protectress of England was a widespread devotional motif throughout the Middle Ages, such beliefs enduring amongst English Catholics following the English Reformation in the 16th century. Whilst Eadmer argued that Christ's human perfection required that his Mother should be also without sin, Anselm held that by excluding any person from the taint of Original Sin destroyed the absolute necessity for the Incarnation. The fact that the doctrine spread throughout England and France throughout the Twelfth Century may have been largely, and ironically, due to the mis-attribution of Eadmer's De Conceptione Sanctae Mariae to Anselm's authorship.

== Patronage ==
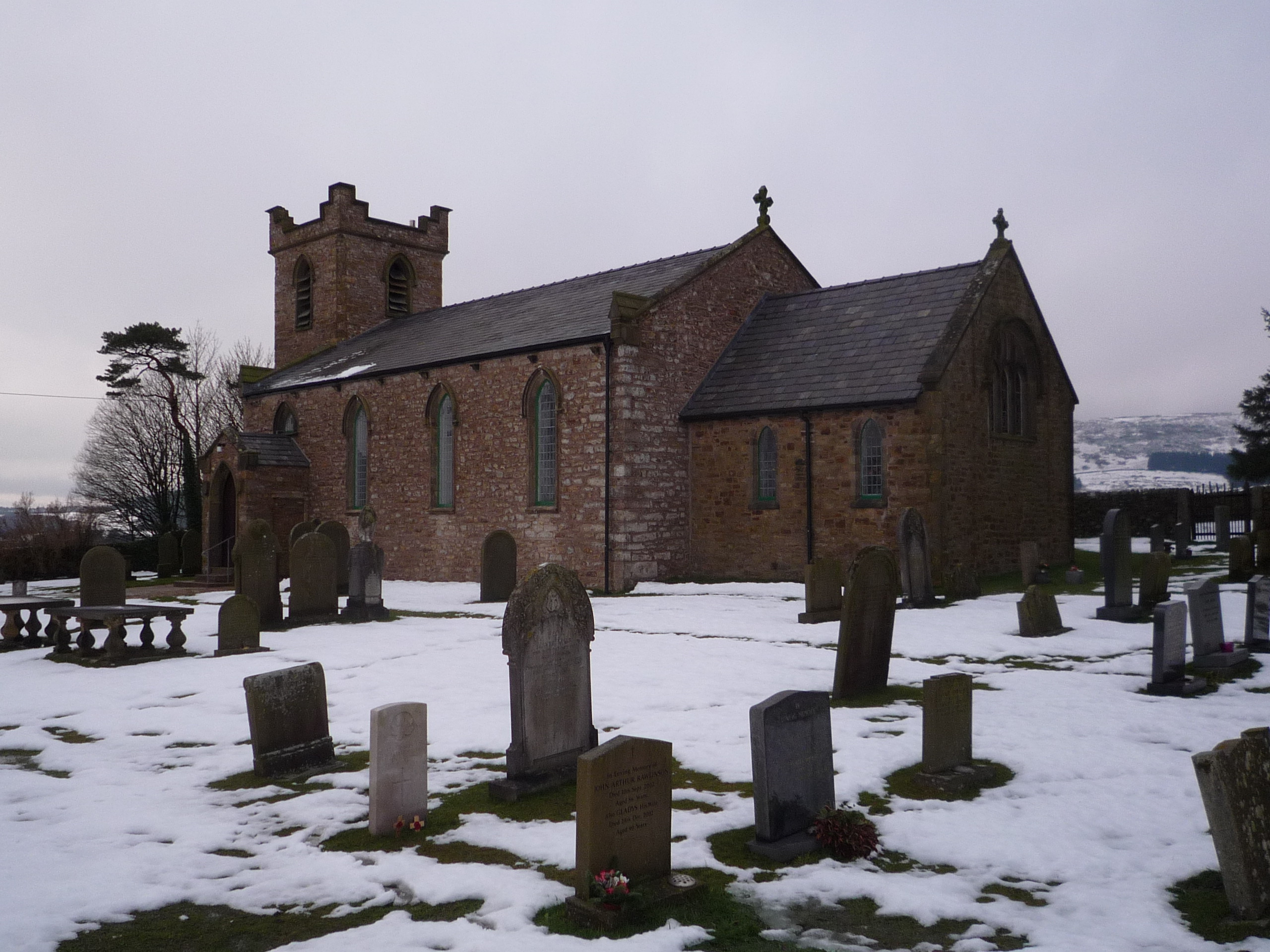
St Eadmer's Church, Bleasdale, in 2009

St Eadmer's church in Bleasdale, Borough of Wyre, Lancashire, England is the only church in the United Kingdom dedicated to Eadmer. It was built in 1835 on the site of an earlier chapel which appears (as "Eadmor's Chapel") on a map dated 1598, and is grade II listed.

== Works ==
Eadmer left a large number of writings, the most important of which is his Historia novorum in Anglia, a work which deals mainly with the history of England between 1066 and 1122. Although concerned principally with ecclesiastical affairs, the Historia, scholars agree, is one of the ablest and most valuable writings of its kind. It was first edited by John Selden in 1623 and, with Eadmer's Vita Anselmi, was edited by Martin Rule for the Rolls Series (London, 1884). R. W. Southern re-edited Vita Anselmi in 1963 with a facing page translation, and Geoffrey Bosanquet translated the Rolls text of Historia Novorum in 1964.

The Vita Anselmi, written in about 1124, and first printed at Antwerp in 1551, is probably the best contemporary life of the saint. Less noteworthy are Eadmer's lives of St Dunstan, St Bregwine, archbishop of Canterbury, and St Oswald, archbishop of York. The manuscripts of most of Eadmer's works are preserved in the Parker Library at Corpus Christi College, Cambridge.

- Historia novorum, ed. M. Rule, Eadmeri Historia novorum in Anglia. Rolls Series 81. 1884.
- Vita S. Anselmi "Life of St Anselm" (c. 1124), ed. and tr. R.W. Southern, The life of St Anselm, archbishop of Canterbury. T. Nelson (New York), 1962. 2nd ed., Oxford University Press (Oxford), 1972.
- Vita S. Oswaldi "Life of St Oswald" and Miracula S. Oswaldi, ed. and tr. Bernard J. Muir and Andrew J. Turner, Eadmer of Canterbury. Lives and Miracles of Saints Oda, Dunstan, and Oswald. OMT. Oxford, 2006. 213-98 and 290–324; ed. J. Raine, Historians of the Church of York and its Archbishops. Rolls Series 71. 3 vols: vol 2. London, 1879. 1–40 and 41–59.
- Vita Wilfridi Episcopi "Life of Bishop Wilfrid", ed. J. Raine, Historians of the Church of York and its Archbishops. Rolls Series 71. 3 vols: vol 1. London, 1879. 161–226.
- Breviloquium Vitae Wilfridi, ed. J. Raine, Historians of the Church of York and its Archbishops. Rolls Series 71. 3 vols: vol 1. London, 1879. 227–37.
- Vita S. Odonis "Life of St Oda", Archbishop of Canterbury, ed. and tr. Bernard J. Muir and Andrew J. Turner, Eadmer of Canterbury. Lives and Miracles of Saints Oda, Dunstan, and Oswald. OMT. Oxford, 2006. 1–40.
- Vita S. Dunstani "Life of St Dunstan", Archbishop of Canterbury, and Miracula S. Dunstani, ed. and tr. Bernard J. Muir and Andrew J. Turner, Eadmer of Canterbury. Lives and Miracles of Saints Oda, Dunstan, and Oswald. OMT. Oxford, 2006. 41–159 and 160–212; ed. W. Stubbs, Memorials of St Dunstan, archbishop of Canterbury. Rolls Series 63. London, 1874. 162–249, 412–25.
- "Life of St Bregowine", Archbishop of Canterbury, ed. Henry Wharton, Anglia Sacra. London, 1691. 75–87 (where the Life is wrongly attributed to Osbern).
- Vita S. Audoeni "Life of St Audoen"
- Prayers and Meditations:

I Consideratio Edmeri peccatoris et pauperis Dei de excellentia gloriosissimae Viginis Matris Dei.

II Scriptum Edmeri peccatoris ad commovendam super se misericordiam beati Petri ianitoris caelestis.

III Insipida quaedam divinae dispensationis consideratio ab Eadmero magno peccatore de beatissimo Gabriele archangelo.

IV De Conceptione Sanctae Mariae editum ab Eadmero monacho magno peccatore.

== Notes ==
Catholic Church titles
Preceded by Thurgot	Bishop of Cell Rígmonaid (St. Andrews) el. 1120	Succeeded by Robert
