= A. A. Scot Skirving =

Scottish physician

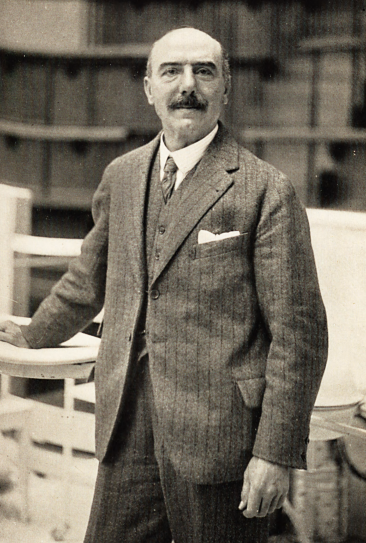
A A Scot Skirving

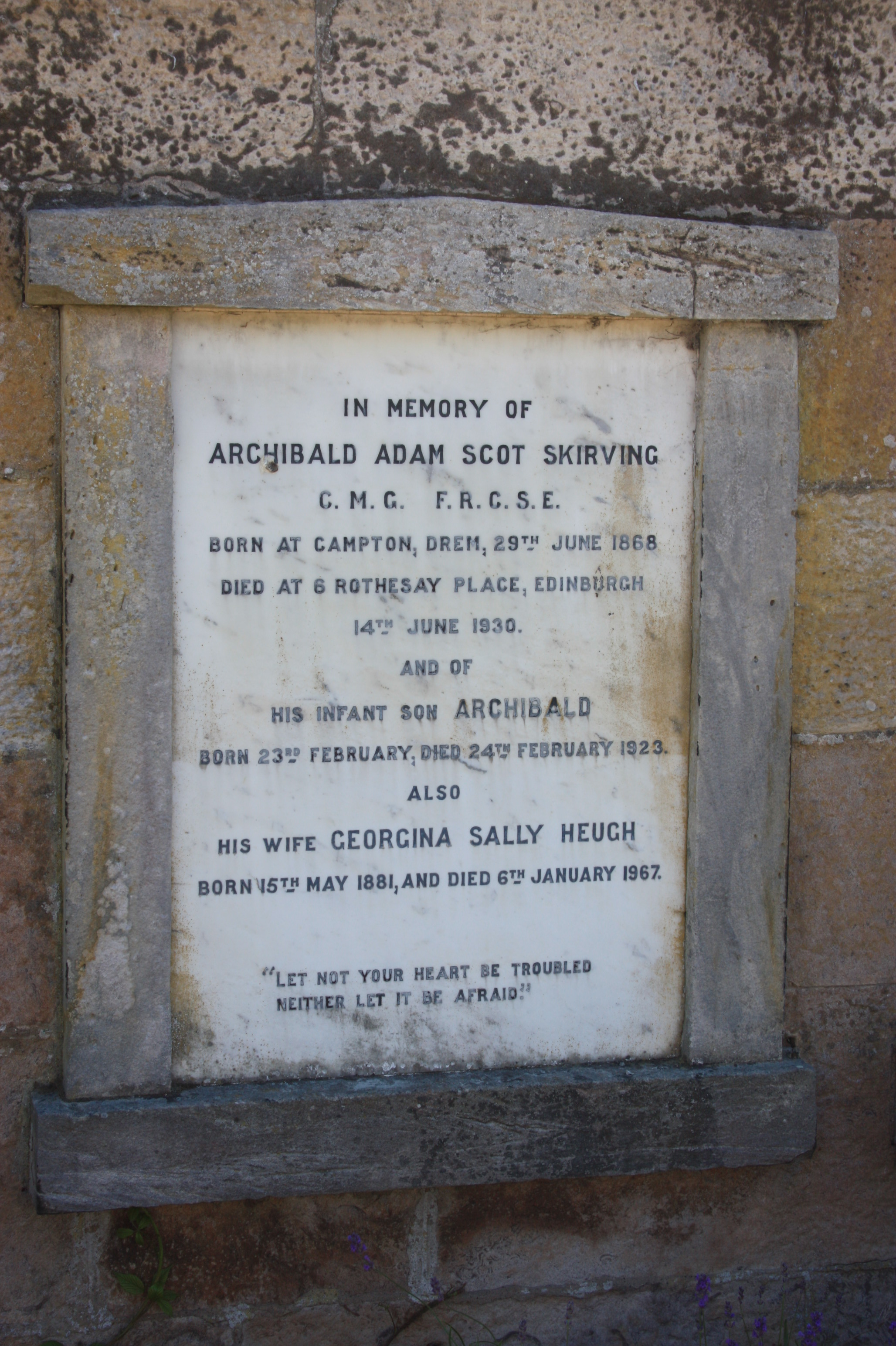
The grave of A. A. Scot Skirving, St Mary's, Haddington

Archibald Adam Scot Skirving CMG FRSE MID (1868–1930) was a 19th/20th century Scottish physician.

== Life ==
His family had owned Campton Farm in the parish of Drem near Haddington in East Lothian but he was born at Nether Quarry Holes off Easter Road in Leith on 29 June 1868. He was the fifth son of Elizabeth (known as "Leila") Owen, daughter of William Owen of Rathdowney in Ireland and Robert Scot Skirving (d.1900), a farmer. His paternal ancestors included both Adam Skirving the songwriter, and Archibald Skirving the artist.

He was educated at Edinburgh Academy from 1879 to 1884 then spent five years at Cheltenham College. He then studied medicine at the University of Edinburgh graduating MB ChB. He acted as a junior under Professor John Chiene at Edinburgh Royal Infirmary then undertook two years further studies in Paris and Berlin. His first senior post was as senior surgeon at Leith Hospital. He then became surgeon at the Edinburgh Royal Infirmary also lecturing in clinical surgery at the University of Edinburgh.

He appears to have lived with his parents at 29 Drummond Place in Edinburgh's New Town, possibly purchased by his brother who was making his fame in Australia.

His first war service was in the Second Boer War attached to the Imperial Yeomanry as their field surgeon. He was mentioned in dispatches and was created a Commander of the Order of St. Michael and St. George (CMG).

By 1910 he was living independently at 8 Randolph Crescent on the edge of the Moray Estate.

In the First World War he served as a major in the Royal Army Medical Corps in France and in Scotland at Bangour Hospital. Unlike many he did not use his military title after the war ended.

In 1924 he was elected a Fellow of the Royal Society of Edinburgh. His proposers were James Young Simpson, Lord Theodore Salvesen, Arthur Robertson Cushny, and Alexander Lauder.

He retired due to ill health in 1928 and died at 6 Rothesay Place in Edinburgh's West End on 14 June 1930. He is buried in the churchyard of St Mary's Collegiate Church, Haddington, next to his parents. The grave lies in the extreme south-west corner next to a secondary entrance gate.

== Family ==
His eldest brother was Robert Scot Skirving.

Archibald married Georgina Sally Heugh (1881-1967). Their infant son Archibald Scot Skirving only lived one day.

== Publications ==
- Applied Anatomy (1908)
- Surgical Applied Anatomy
- The article The Neck in the Encyclopaedia Medica
