= Robert Scot Skirving =

Robert Scot Skirving MB ChM, FRACS, FRACP, FRCS
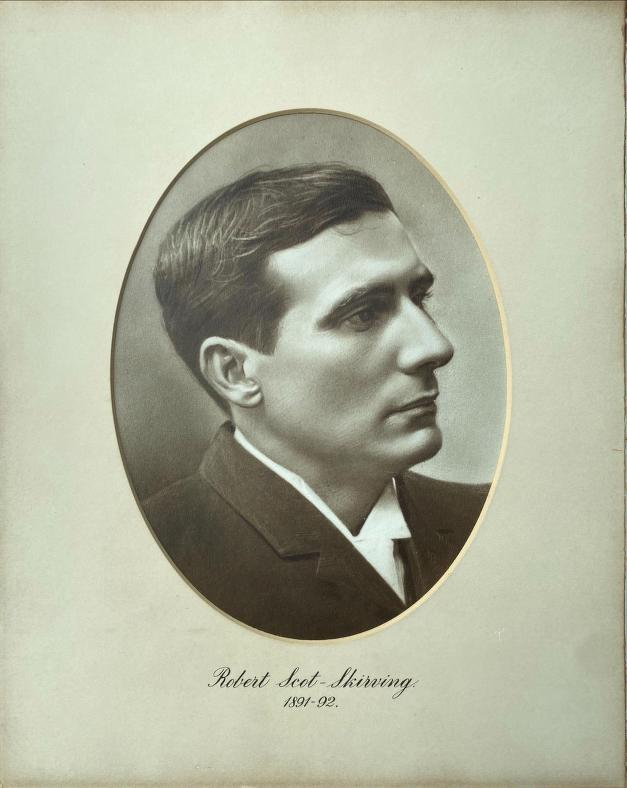
- Scot Skirving in 1892
- Born: 18 December 1859; Campton, Scotland
- Died: 15 July 1956 (aged 96); Sydney, Australia
- Education: Mr Haig's Private School, Haddington Mr Henderson's Preparatory School, Edinburgh The Academy, Edinburgh Faculty of Medicine, Edinburgh
- Occupations: Doctor, Surgeon
- Spouse: Lucy Susan Hester (married 1886)

Robert Scot Skirving (1859–1956) was a physician and surgeon in Australia. He was born in the United Kingdom. The University of Sydney named the Scot Skirving Prize (for Medicine and Surgery) in his honour.

== Life ==
He was born on 18 December 1859 at Campton Farm in the parish of Drem near Haddington, East Lothian. He was the son of Robert Scot Skirving, a farmer, and his wife Elizabeth (known as "Leila") Owen, daughter of William Owen of Rathdowney in Ireland. His paternal ancestors included both Adam Skirving the songwriter, and Archibald Skirving the artist.

The family left the farm and moved to Nether Quarry Holes off Easter Road in Leith (the harbour area of Edinburgh) in his youth. However his father seems to have had money and he moved to 29 Drummond Place, a huge Georgian townhouse in Edinburgh's New Town by 1875.

He was raised in an atmosphere of extreme Scottish Calvinism. He was sent to Edinburgh Academy for education, then trained at the Eastman's Royal Naval Academy in Portsmouth. However, he ended in the merchant navy rather the Royal Navy. He first served ships plying with Iceland, then on HMS Conway (a training ship). In 1875, aged 16, he joined the SS Tantallon Castle, a mail ship, at that time bound for Port Adelaide in Australia. During the return trip he developed beriberi and was hospitalised once reaching Britain. A long period under medical care inspired him to change his career. In 1876 he enrolled at Edinburgh University to study Medicine and graduated MB ChB in 1881. His classmates included Alexander MacCormick, Thomas Anderson Stuart, and Arthur Conan Doyle. His teachers had included Thomas Annandale, Patrick Heron Watson, James Duncan, Douglas Argyll Robertson and John Chiene. He did further postgraduate studies in both Dublin and Vienna. He then worked for some time at the then new Edinburgh Royal Infirmary.

In 1883 he joined the migrant ship SS Ellora as a ship's surgeon and returned to Australia. In November his old classmate and friend Thomas Anderson Stuart appointed him Medical Superintendent of the Royal Prince Alfred Hospital in Sydney. In 1884 he also set up a private consultancy at College Street in Sydney. He also served as Honorary Physician at the Hospital for Sick Children, but clashed with its lady superintendent, Frances Holden, forcing him to step down in 1889. He filled this gap by becoming honorary surgeon at St Vincent's Hospital, Sydney (1889-1923) and by lecturing at the University of Sydney.

During the Second Boer War he served with Australian troops in South Africa alongside Alexander MacCormick. In the First World War he returned to Britain serving as a Major in the Royal Army Medical Corps, based at an auxiliary hospital in Essex. He then moved as a specialist surgeon to treat wounded at the Queen Alexandra Military Hospital in Millbank, London. He returned to Sydney in January 1919.

He died at home in Bellevue Hill in Sydney on 15 July 1956. He was cremated. The service reflected his Scottish roots, playing the traditional Scottish lament Flowers of the Forest.

== Positions of note ==
- President of the New South Wales branch of the British Medical Association 1891–92
- Chief Medical Advisor to the Australian Mutual Provident Society 1911–1936
- Member of the League of Ancient Mariners of New South Wales
- Fellow of the Royal Australasian College of Surgeons (1927–1956)
- Fellow of the Royal Australasian College of Physicians (1938–1956)
- Honorary Fellow of the Royal College of Surgeons in London (1953–56)

== Publications ==
- Our Army in South Africa (1901)
- Love and Longitude (1901)
- Wire Splicing for Yachtsmen (1931)

== Family ==
He married Lucy Susan Hester (d.1950) in January 1886 in Willoughby, New South Wales. They had three sons one of whom died in infancy.

His brother was Archibald Adam Scot Skirving FRSE (1868-1930)

Archibald Waller Scot Skirving served as a Captain in the Royal Irish Fusiliers and was killed at Gallipoli during the First World War. His body was not found and he is listed on the Helles Memorial.

His eldest son Robert Scot Skirving returned to Britain and was a doctor at Leith Hospital. He married Leila Stephanie Barton, daughter of Australia's first prime minister, Sir Edmund Barton.
