= Frances Gillam Holden =

Australian nurse (1843–1924)

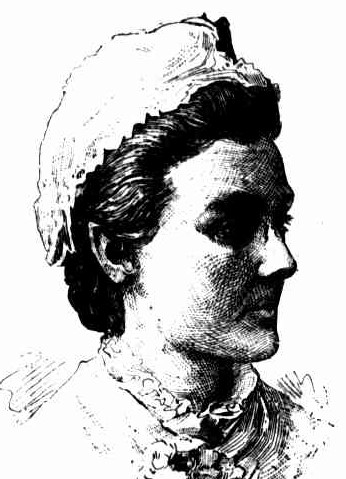
- Born: 9 February 1843; Gosford, New South Wales, Australia
- Died: 21 August 1924 (aged 81); Burwood, New South Wales, Australia
- Known for: Lady Superintendent of Hospital for Sick Children, Co-founder of The Dawn Club
- Medical career
- Profession: Nurse
- Institutions: Hospital for Sick Children

Frances Gillam Holden (9 February 1843 – 21 August 1924) was an Australian nurse who later became the Lady Superintendent of the Hospital for Sick Children (now the Royal Alexandra Hospital for Children) in Glebe, Sydney. Holden was also a prolific writer and wrote books, poems, and contributed to journal and newspaper articles with her publications focusing on topics such as nursing practices, physiology, and women's rights. Holden was also the co-founder of The Dawn Club, a women's suffrage group and made regular contributions to its magazine, The Dawn. For her contributions as a writer and as a women's rights supporter, Holden is regarded as a first-wave feminist.

== Early life ==
Gillam was born into a middle-class family at Gosford, New South Wales, Australia. She was the eldest daughter of Alfred Holden of Penshurst, and his wife Jane (née Osborne). Her father worked as a police magistrate at Brisbane Water and her mother was the daughter of Dr Alick Osborne. Holden was also the niece of George Kenyan Holden, a solicitor and politician, and cousins with John Watt, a businessman.

The Holden family lived in Newport for a couple of years before moving to Penshurst in 1849.

Holden, along with her eleven siblings, were avid readers and were known as "the little bookworms" by other families in their neighborhood; she herself took her reading tastes from her father, enjoying books on English literature, poems, history, and Shakespeare. The twelve children were educated by in-home tutors due to her father's dislike of the idea of schools.

Holden initially worked as a governess but began to show interest in nursing as she deemed it as a "more meaningful and rewarding sphere of work".

== Nursing ==
=== Sydney Infirmary and Dispensary ===
At age 31, Holden took up nursing along with three of her younger sisters, Laura, Rosamund, and Edith. On 10 June 1874, Holden and Rosamund entered the Sydney Infirmary and Dispensary to train under Lucy Osburn, Nightingale's protégé at the infirmary. Holden often did not get along with her superior [Osburn]. Privately, Osburn wrote:

I have no Sisters now I had a body of the name of Fanny Holden, and she cured me of any wish for sisters which I think will last forever! Dreadfully disagreeable she was.

On 3 March 1875, Holden, along with four other nurses, two of whom were her sisters, was dismissed as incompetent by Osburn. Upon her dismissal, Holden "objected to go so very strongly Mr Street (the Honorary Secretary) had to come in and discharge her." After her dismissal, she nursed privately for a few months in Sydney.

During her nine months working in the infirmary, Holden had predominantly worked in the men's and accident's wards.

=== Hobart General Hospital ===
In January 1876, Holden and her sisters Laura and Rosamund began work at Hobart General Hospital. There, they assisted the new Lady Superintendent, Florence Abbott, in reconstructing the administration and management of the hospital. During her time at the hospital, Holden was involved in conflict with medical staff who were allegedly undermining the authority of the Lady Superintendent [Abbott] as well the female nurses helping her. As a result, a parliamentary commission was held which resultantly vindicated Holden's complaints.

During her time working there, Holden's health began to break down due to stress and within a year, she contracted typhoid and was invalided to Melbourne on a full salary in 1877.

=== Hospital for Sick Children ===
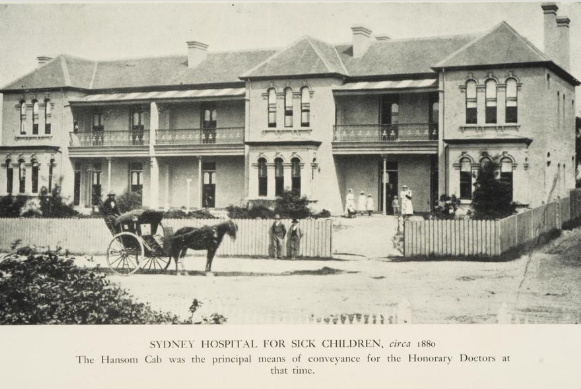
Hospital for Sick Children, Glebe

In 1880, Holden began work in Hospital for Sick Children which her cousin, J. B. Watt helped establish. Later, she applied for and was selected to be Lady Superintendent. Throughout her time working, Holden regularly met with and was supervised by the ladies of the House Committee.

Under Holden's supervision as Lady Superintendent, the Hospital for Sick Children made great progress:

It [The Hospital for Sick Children] has been a wonderful success, and the minimum death rate within its walls, and the maximum of cures effected, have been remarkable. For these good results, the main credit has been admittedly due to Miss Holden, who has had charge of the hospital since its foundation.

Despite this success, Holden faced a problem with the honorary physicians and surgeons at the hospital. She was open about her disapproval, complaining to the House Committee regarding the lack of a resident medical officer and the infrequent nature of the visiting doctors, with the doctors visiting the hospital only once or twice a week. She further disliked the perfunctory manner in which some of the doctors dismissed their duties as well as their rudeness to her nurses. Her most serious allegation was made against the influential Dr Anderson Stuart, the Professor of Anatomy at the University of Sydney, when she argued that a young girl might have lived if he had promptly responded to her call. By 1884, the dispute between Holden and the medical staff erupted when the doctors threatened to resign unless Holden was dismissed. As a result, the Board of the hospital decided that the Lady Superintendent be asked to resign; this decision was not supported by the House Committee of ladies.

Holden began to publicize her complaints about the doctors and her treatment by Board members. She warned the Board:

I have only to take a sheet of foolscap and pen and state the truth to show not Sydney only but all Australia that the management of this institution has been a mixture of burlesque and tragedy.

By 1887, the conflict had become a public debate in the press. The issue was considered "an absorbing topic of public discussion in the metropolis for weeks" where it "spread widely throughout the country."

Due to the serious nature of Holden's publicized allegations against the doctors and the government's status as a subscriber to the institution, a government inquiry was held. Despite being ill again with typhoid, (Holden was described to have a "delicate constitution", which she supposedly inherited from her father.) Holden prepared her case; however even with the affirmative testimonials provided by her colleagues, ex-patients, and friends, including Dr Andrew Ross, she failed to prove her charges and was formally dismissed in October 1887. Several members of the staff went with her.

=== Nursing beliefs and practices ===
As a nurse, Holden was an advocate of critical and scientific thinking for nurses as opposed to religious moralizing. She placed emphasis on the importance of education for nurses, particularly concerning science and physiology as well as clinical practice that would eventually facilitate the independent decision making of the nurse. Her principles were based on the idea that there was a much-needed transition of nursing from being considered "philanthropic or charitable, towards being considered a trained and science-based area of expertise". For Holden, science and research-based information was the basis for social reform and was important for the progression of medicine- to improve the qualities of nurses would be to improve the quality of a hospital.

Holden believed that nurses and female doctors were the quintessential woman.

Whilst working at Hobart General Hospital, Holden utilized the following nursing practices to maintain the health and safety of patients diagnosed with typhoid:

1. Moving a patient requires three people to do it safely. It is recommended that the nurses carry the patient as if the patient were a "dishful of liquid diamonds". You must be steady and quiet when lifting and moving
2. Rooms, linen, and person must be clean
3. Bedclothes should be changed frequently (every three hours) and blankets should be aired
4. Patients should be sponged frequently in high temperature
5. Patients must be given good liquid nourishment of beef tea, mutton broth or chicken broth, or Ice Company's milk, acid drinks, and ice to suck
6. Patients must be given plenty of fresh air
7. Use wet sheets insulated by blankets and place on patient's bed to lower their temperature. Replace wet sheet every 10 to 15 minutes depending on their fever (called "packing")
8. Clean the patient's mouth several times a day using a "mop" (strips of lint attached to the end of a small paintbrush)
9. Change soiled linen- disinfect soiled linen by first placing them in a tub of water with carbolic added then through thorough cleaning and exposure to fresh air
10. When a typhoid patient has died, it is important to remove everything from the bed and the surrounding area; the mattress should be taken and left to air for at least one day and the empty bed frame should be aired for a minimum of 24 hours

Holden's nursing practices developed during her time at the Hobart General Hospital were crucial in the six months from January to June 1887 when there was an influx of typhoid patients admitted to the institution.

== As a writer ==
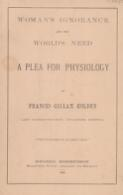
Book cover of A Plea for Physiology

Holden was a prominent writer with several of her books having a wide circulation, with some of her most popular publications were written during the time she worked as Lady Superintendent. As a writer and author, she published a variety of works including lectures, journal and newspaper articles, books, and poems in which she discussed a range of topics including public health, hospital reform, physiology, nursing, and women's rights. Her personal experience with typhoid, both as a sufferer and as a nurse, inspired several articles on its treatment.

From the early 1870s, Holden began contributing articles to journals and newspapers, usually under pseudonyms such as "Australienne" and "Lyra Australia".

In the early 1880s and early 1890s, Holden became involved in organized feminism and began writing for women's journals. Her publications included arguments for higher education for women and discussion on women's roles as wives and mothers. In essays such as "Woman's Work", she argues that the domesticity of women is not to be shamed or trivialized, rather it should be celebrated as a source of social progress. Holden believed that "no duties were more honorable than domestic duties".

In 1887, Holden wrote a collection of poems which she titled, Her Father's Darling. In this publication, her writing has been stated to be "simple, natural, and sympathetic" while being "uneven and unpolished at times".

=== Works ===
- Trained Nursing (1882); her treatise
- Woman's Ignorance and the World's Need: A Plea for Physiology (1883). In this pamphlet, Holden advocates for women's physiological education
- Plain Words to Mothers and Temperance Reformers on Food and Health (1883)
- Plain Directions for Nursing Typhoid (1883). Written for the Australian Women's Magazine
- The Travels of Red-jacket and White-cap; or, a History of the Circulation of the Blood (1884). This was an instructive booklet. Dr Andrew Ross wrote the preface and recommended it as a textbook in schools
- Scientific and Useful: Dying of Typhoid, or Dying of Ignorance, - Which? (1886). Holden discusses the importance of women's education. Touches specifically on the importance of scientific knowledge in taking care of the sick
- Her Father's Darling (1887). A small collection of verse and prose. Introduction was given by Rev. William Woolls
- Women's work (1888). The winning essay in the Sydney Exhibition of Women's industries

Holden also contributed to the following publications:

- The Sydney Mail
- Humanity and Health
- Sydney Quarterly Magazine
- The Launceston Examiner
- The Mercury
- Australian Women's Magazine
- Sydney and Melbourne Universities
- The Armidale Express and New England General Advertiser

== Feminism ==
In 1888, Holden co-founded The Dawn Club along with Louisa Lawson, who was also a prominent writer and suffragist. Holden became the vice-president of the association and composed its manifesto. Later, she would become a contributing writer to its journal, The Dawn.

In 1902, the editors of the magazine lost contact with Holden.

== Later years ==
During World War I, although an invalid, Holden worked for the soldiers. She also worked for the Red Cross Society and kindergartens by making ornamental and crochet work, which would be used to sell and collect funds.

On 21 August 1924, she died at Burwood and was buried in the Church of England section of Rookwood Cemetery.

== Impact ==
Despite the controversies Holden was involved in, many sources discuss the positive impact she has had on both nursing and women's recognition. She has been noted to have contributed to the growth of women's sphere of influence by challenging male medical professional power. The Australian Town and Country Journal (1887) states:

No one questions her [Holden's] remarkable skill in the noble and self-sacrificing calling she has adopted or her unselfish and single-hearted devotion to that calling.

Holden has also been seen to have:

Helped place nursing on the public agenda, wrote pamphlets demystifying illness, and argued for women's rights, but her lead was followed by few other nursing leaders.

=== AAHN ===
In 2015, Holden was mentioned in the American Association for the History of Nursing's Annual Conference for her work and life in nursing.

== See also ==
- Nursing in Australia
