= James Thomas Wilson =

James Thomas Wilson FRS (1861-1945) was a Professor of Anatomy at the University of Cambridge and an elected Fellow of the Royal Society.

In 1886, he was invited by T.P. Anderson Stewart to become a demonstrator in anatomy in the recently established medical school at the University of Sydney, and was soon promoted to the new post of Challis Professor of Anatomy in Sydney. He subsequently became dean of the Faculty of Medicine, then later moved back to the UK to take up the post of Professor of Anatomy in Cambridge from 1920 and a fellowship at St John's College.

He made several important contributions to the study of anatomy and was elected president of the Anatomical Society of Great Britain and Ireland for 1922 to 1924.
