= Lockhart baronets =

Set index for Lockhart baronets

There have been two baronetcies created for persons with the surname Lockhart, one in the Baronetage of Nova Scotia and one in the Baronetage of the United Kingdom. Both creations are extinct.

- Lockhart baronets of Carstairs (1672): see Lockhart-Ross baronets
- Lockhart baronets of Lee (1806)

== See also ==
- Sinclair-Lockhart baronets
- Denham baronets
