= Sinclair-Lockhart baronets =

Baronetcy in the Baronetage of Nova Scotia

The Sinclair (later Sinclair-Lockhart) Baronetcy of Stevenson in the County of Haddington, is a title in the Baronetage of Nova Scotia. It was created on 18 June 1636 for John Sinclair of Stevenson, with remainder to his heirs male whatsoever. The third Baronet was a Baron of the Exchequer and member of the Privy Council of Scotland. The fourth Baronet married Martha, daughter and eventual heiress of Sir John Lockhart of Castlehill, a Lord of Session under the judicial title of Lord Castlehill. The eighth Baronet was an Admiral in the Royal Navy. On the death in 1899 of his son, the ninth Baronet, the title passed to a descendant of James Sinclair, younger son of the fifth Baronet, who in 1764 had inherited the Lockhart estates and assumed the surname of Lockhart. The tenth Baronet was a major general in the British Army and assumed the additional surname of Lockhart. The eleventh Baronet was the son of George Duncan Lockhart (whose grandfather had assumed the surname of Lockhart in lieu of his patronymic), another descendant of James, younger son of the fifth Baronet.

== Sinclair, later Sinclair-Lockhart, baronets of Stevenson (1636) ==
- Sir John Sinclair, 1st Baronet (died 1649)
- Sir John Sinclair, 2nd Baronet (1642–1652)
- Sir Robert Sinclair, 3rd Baronet (1643–1713)
- Sir John Sinclair, 4th Baronet (died 1726)
- Sir Robert Sinclair, 5th Baronet (died 1754)
- Sir John Sinclair, 6th Baronet (died 1789)
- Sir Robert Sinclair, 7th Baronet (died 1795)
- Sir John Gordon Sinclair, 8th Baronet (1790–1863)
- Sir Robert Charles Sinclair, 9th Baronet (1820–1899)
- Sir Graeme Alexander Sinclair-Lockhart, 10th Baronet (1820–1904)
- Sir Robert Duncan Sinclair-Lockhart, 11th Baronet (1856–1919)
- Sir Graeme Duncan Power Sinclair-Lockhart, 12th Baronet (1897–1959)
- Sir John Beresford Sinclair-Lockhart, 13th Baronet (1904–1970)
- Sir Muir Edward Sinclair-Lockhart, 14th Baronet (1906–1985)
- Sir Simon John Edward Francis Sinclair-Lockhart, 15th Baronet (born 1941)

The heir apparent is the present holder's son James Lachlan Sinclair-Lockhart (born 1973).

== See also ==
- Sinclair baronets
- Lockhart baronets
