= Sir Robert Sinclair, 9th Baronet =

Sir Robert Charles Sinclair, 9th Baronet DL (1820–1899), was a baronet in the Baronetage of Nova Scotia, the ninth of the Sinclair-Lockhart baronets of Murkle in the County of Caithness and of Stevenson in the County of Haddington.

== Biography ==
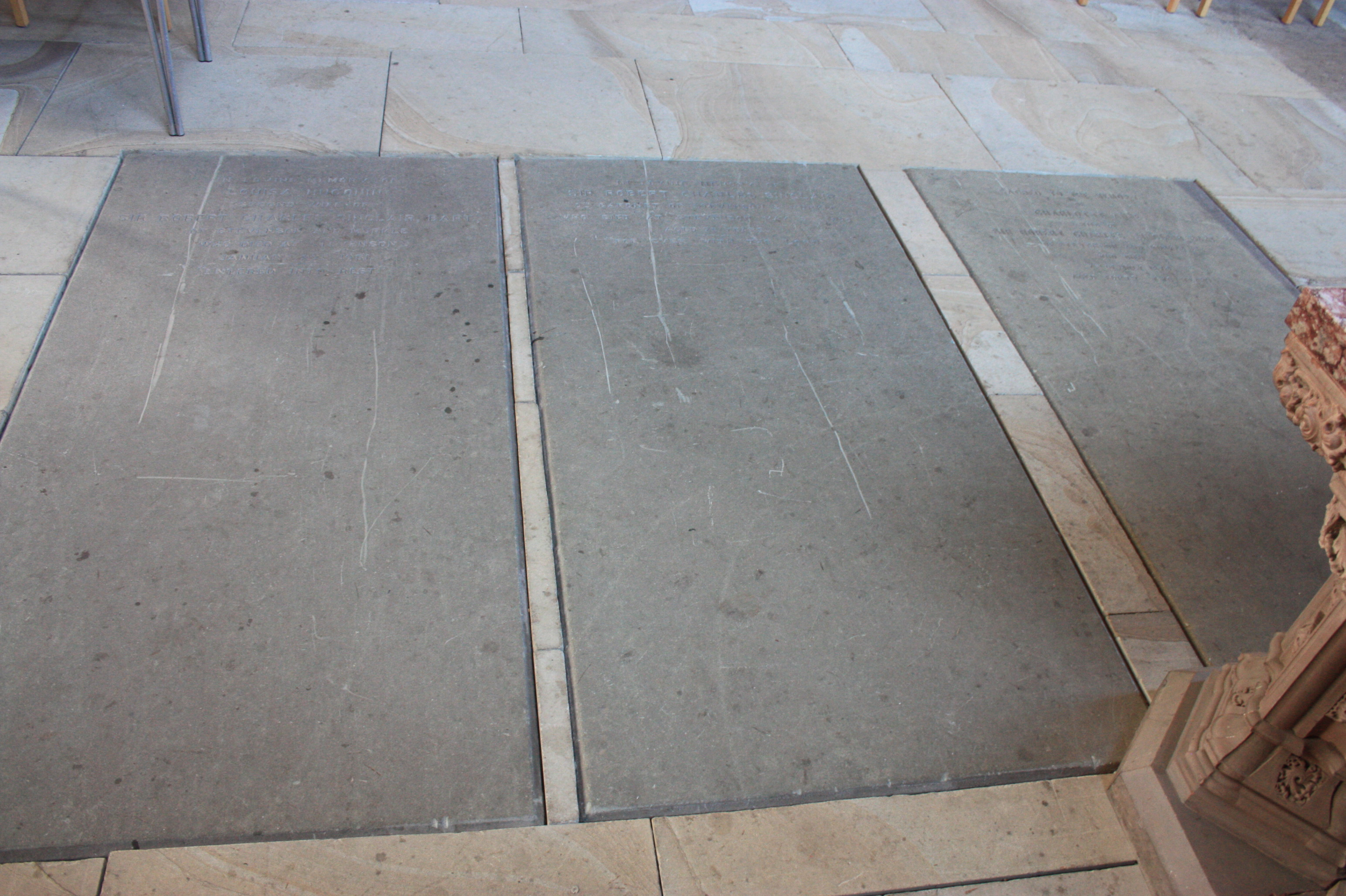
The grave of Sir Robert Charles Sinclair, St Mary's Church, Haddington

Born in Paris on 25 August 1820, the son of Admiral Sir John Gordon Sinclair, 8th Baronet (1790–1863), the grandson of Admiral Hon. Michael de Courcy, and the great-grandson of John de Courcy, 18th Lord Kingsale, Sir Robert Sinclair, 9th Baronet was educated at Bedford School. He was the ninth of the Sinclair-Lockhart baronets of Murkle in the County of Caithness and of Stevenson in the County of Haddington, created on 18 June 1636 for Sir John Sinclair, 1st Baronet (d. 1649). He succeeded to the title upon the death of his father, the 8th baronet, in 1863.

Sir Robert Sinclair, 9th Baronet died without issue in Haddington, East Lothian on 5 May 1899, aged 78, and was succeeded by his kinsman Major General Sir Graeme Alexander Sinclair-Lockhart, 10th Baronet (1820–1904).

He is buried just in front of the altar inside St Mary's Collegiate Church, Haddington. His two wives flank him.

Baronetage of Nova Scotia
Preceded by John Gordon Sinclair	Baronet (of Murkleand and of Stevenson); 1863–1899	Succeeded by Graeme Alexander Sinclair-Lockhart
