= Hey, Johnnie Cope, Are Ye Waking Yet? =

Traditional song

Song
- Language: Scots
- Written: c. 1745
- Published: c. 1745
- Composer: Traditional
- Lyricist: Adam Skirving

"Hey, Johnnie Cope, are Ye Wauking Yet?" (Roud 2315), also "Hey Johnnie Cope, are you awake yet?", "Heigh! Johnnie Cowp, are ye wauken yet?", or simply "Johnny Cope" is a Scottish folk song that also features in bagpipe recitals.

== Background ==
The song commemorates the Battle of Prestonpans, fought on 21 September during the Jacobite rising of 1745. Forces led by the Stuart exile Charles Edward Stuart defeated a government army under Sir John Cope, whose troops broke in the face of a Highland charge. The battle lasted less than fifteen minutes and was a huge boost to Jacobite morale, while a heavily mythologised version of the story entered art and legend. Cope and two others were tried by a court-martial in 1746 and exonerated, the court deciding defeat was due to the 'shameful conduct of the private soldiers'.

Adam Skirving, a local farmer, visited the battlefield later that afternoon where he was, by his own account, mugged by the victors. He wrote two songs, "Tranent Muir" and the better-known "Hey, Johnnie Cope, Are Ye Waking Yet?" by using well-known tunes which still feature in Scottish folk music and bagpipe recitals. The song does not accurately represent what occurred during the battle.

The poet Robert Burns later wrote his own words to the song, but these are not as well known as Skirving's.

== Usage ==
It has been recorded by Alastair McDonald, Ewan MacColl, The Corries, Jean Redpath, Planxty, Alex Beaton, Natalie MacMaster, The Tannahill Weavers, Charlie Zahm, Emerald Rose, Back o' the Moon, Ceolbeg and many others. "Johnnie Cope" has been arranged many times, most notably by Ludwig van Beethoven, and also by Ken Johnston for the National Youth Choir of Scotland and the National Boys' Choir. It was performed at the Glasgow leg of Proms in the Park 2007, along with other Johnston arrangements.

The tune, set for pipes, is the regulation pipe call for Réveillé in Highland Regiments of the British Army and also the Scots Guards, in which John Cope served between 1710 and 1712.

The tune and lyrics are featured in the 1969 film The Prime of Miss Jean Brodie.

The tune is used in the soundtrack for the 1973 folk horror film The Wicker Man.

In McAuslan in the Rough, George MacDonald Fraser writes whimsically of being woken by the song while serving as a young subaltern in the Gordon Highlanders.

== Lyrics ==
Cope sent a challenge frae Dunbar,
"Charlie, meet me an' ye daur,
An' I'll learn you the art o' war,
If you'll meet me i' the morning."

Chorus:
Hey, Johnnie Cope, are ye wauking yet?
Or are your drums a-beating yet?
If ye were wauking I wad wait
To gang to the coals i' the morning,

When Charlie looked this letter upon,
He drew his sword the scabbard from,
Come, "Follow me, my merry merry men,
And we'll meet Johnnie Cope i' the morning!"

(Chorus)

'Now Johnnie, be as good's your word,
Come, let us try both fire and sword,
And dinna rin like a frichted bird,
That's chased frae its nest i' the morning.'

(Chorus)

When Johnnie Cope he heard of this,
He thought it wadna not be amiss,
To hae a horse in readiness,
To flee awa' i' the morning.

(Chorus)

Fy now, Johnnie, get up an' rin;
The Highland bagpipes mak' a din;
It's best to sleep in a hale skin,
For 'twill be a bluidy morning.

(Chorus)

When Johnnie Cope to Dunbar came,
They speired at him, 'Where's a' your men?'
'The deil confound me gin I ken,
For I left them a' i' the morning.

(Chorus)

Now Johnnie, troth, ye werena blate,
To come wi' news o' your ain defeat,
And leave your men in sic a strait,
Sae early in the morning.

(Chorus)

'I' faith,' quo' Johnnie, 'I got sic flegs,
Wi' their claymores an' philabegs;,
If I face them again, deil break my legs!
Sae I wish you a' gude morning'.

(Chorus)
