= John Farquharson (architect) =

Scottish architect

John Farquharson (1847–1933) was a Scottish architect operational in the late 19th century and early 20th century. He designed several schools in the East Lothian district.

== Life ==
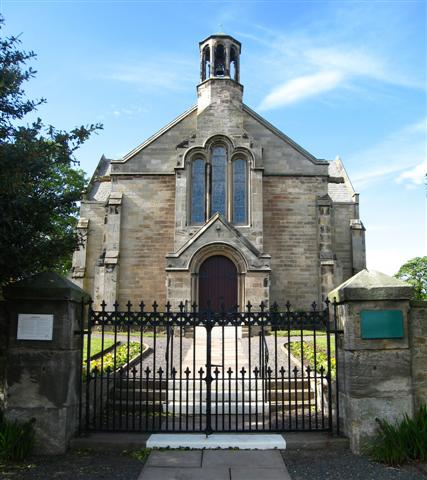
Gladsmuir Parish Church

John Farquharson was born in Haddington, East Lothian, in 1847, to Francis Farquharson, a local architect, and Jessie Richardson. He trained as an architect with his father from around 1862 and officially joined the practice as a partner, creating F & J Farquharson, around 1868. His younger brother Robert Farquharson (1849–1891) also trained as an architect and joined him (from 1875) on several projects, the firm then renaming as J & R Farquharson, but Robert committed suicide by shooting himself on 5 September 1891, aged only 42.

He lived at Hilton Lodge an imposing villa in Haddington. He had offices further along the street at 31 Court Street.

He died on 18 July 1933 and is buried with his parents in the churchyard of St Mary's Collegiate Church, Haddington, against the northern wall.

== Known works ==
- Cockenzie School and Schoolhouse
- Farm manager's house and workers cottages, Eastfield Farm, Whittingehame (1875)
- Joiners Workshop, Whittingehame (1875 with his brother Robert) now restored as cottages
- Prestonpans School (1881)
- Public library, Haddington, East Lothian (1881)
- Gladsmuir Parish Church (1886)
- Ormiston School (1888)
- Macmerry Schoolhouse (1889)
- Galashiels School (1890)
- Alterations to Whittingehame House (1896)
- Waterworks cottage, Spott, East Lothian (1897)
- Premises for Messrs Melville, Dunbar (1902)
- Survey of Lennoxlove House (1903)
- Extension and alterations to the Station Hotel, Dunbar (1909)
- Alterations to Eastfield Farmhouse, Whittingehame (1914)
