= Francis Farquharson (architect) =

Francis Farquharson (1805–1878) was a Scottish architect/builder operational throughout the mid 19th century.

== Life ==
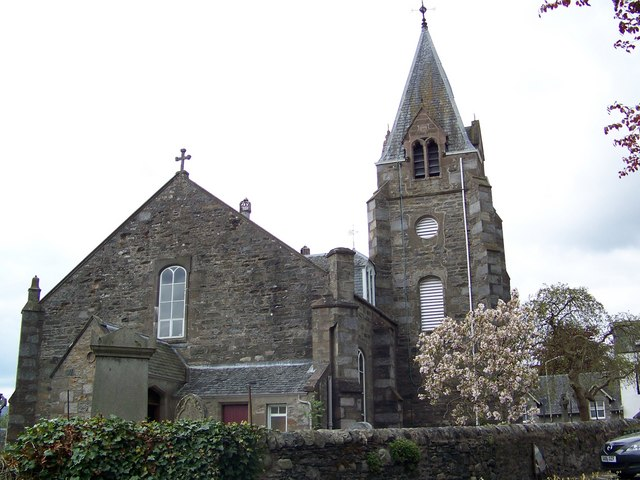
Moulin Church, Pitlochry

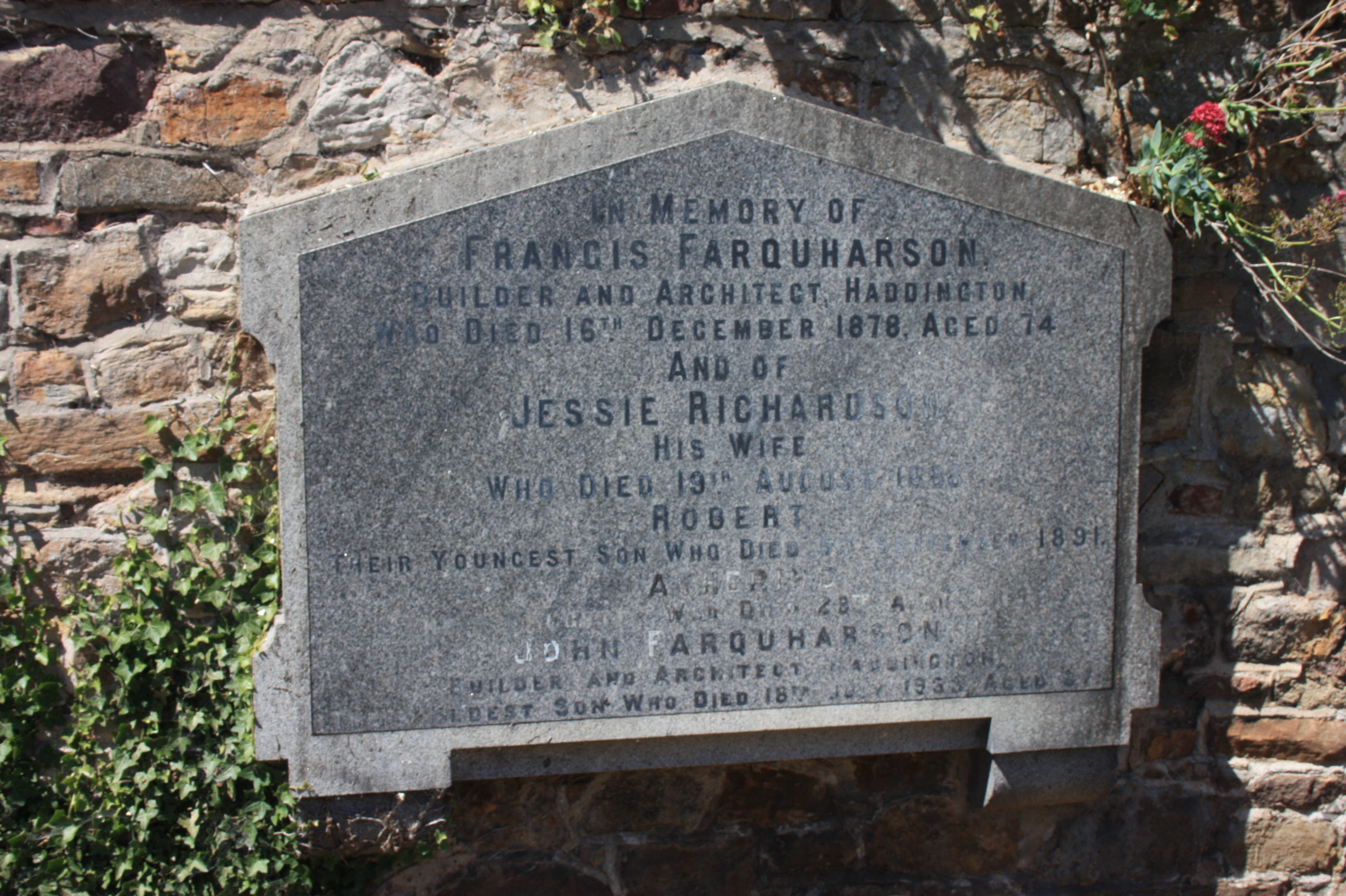
The grave of Francis Farquharson, St Mary's, Haddington

He was born in Auchterarder on 21 October 1805. He was trained as a builder and began also doing design work, but does not appear to have had any formal training in architecture.

He moved to Haddington, East Lothian in 1833 to oversee the design and building of the County Buildings there, and settled there thereafter. In 1863 he became Provost of the town.

He died on 16 December 1878 and is buried in the churchyard of St Mary's Collegiate Church, Haddington, against the northern wall.

== Known works ==
- Moulin Church, Pitlochry (1829)
- Monkrigg House, Haddington (1834)
- Corn Exchange, Haddington (1853)
- Involvement in Kingston House near Dirleton (1859) possibly unbuilt
- North wing, Seacliffe House, North Berwick (1863)
- Manse and Schoolhouse, Gladsmuir (1871)
- Steading, farm cottages and farmhouse improvements, Papple (1871-74) NRS Balfour Papers, GD433/1/22-23
- Joiners Workshop, Whittingehame (1875) now restored as cottages

== Family ==
He was married to Jessie Richardson. His two sons, John Farquharson and Robert Farquharson were also architects. Robert suffered from mental health problems and shot himself in 1891.
