= Archibald Skirving =

British artist (1749–1819)

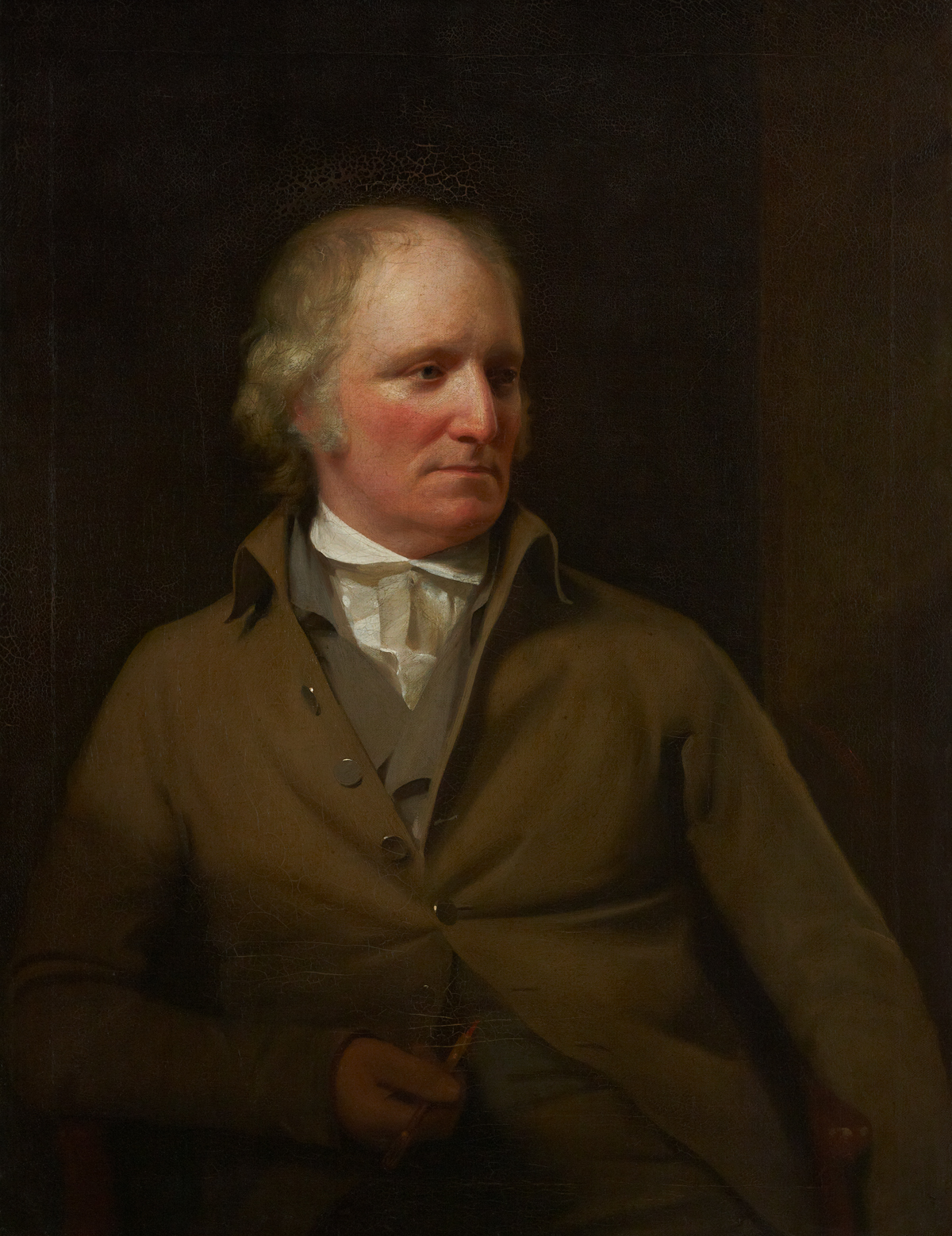
- by George Watson
- Born: 14 October 1749; Athelstaneford, Scotland
- Died: 21 May 1819 (aged 69); Inveresk, Scotland
- Occupation: Portrait painter
- Known for: sketch of Robert Burns
- Children: yes

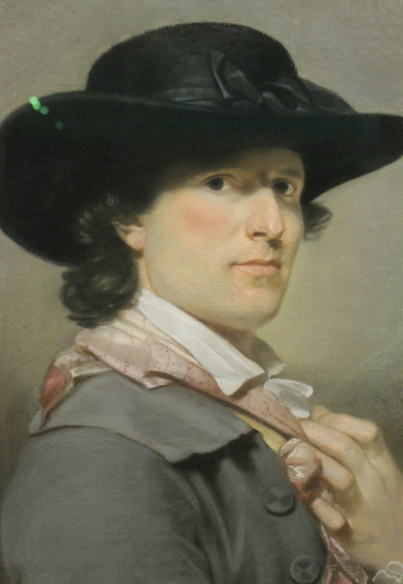
Archibald Skirving self portrait 1790

Archibald Skirving (14 October 1749 – 19 May 1819) was a Scottish portrait painter. He was born at Athelstaneford near Haddington.

== Life ==
Archibald was born in Athelstaneford near Haddington the son of Adam Skirving. His younger brother Robert joined the army in later life. All three (father and sons) wrote poetry, but it is Adam who is best remembered as a songwriter.

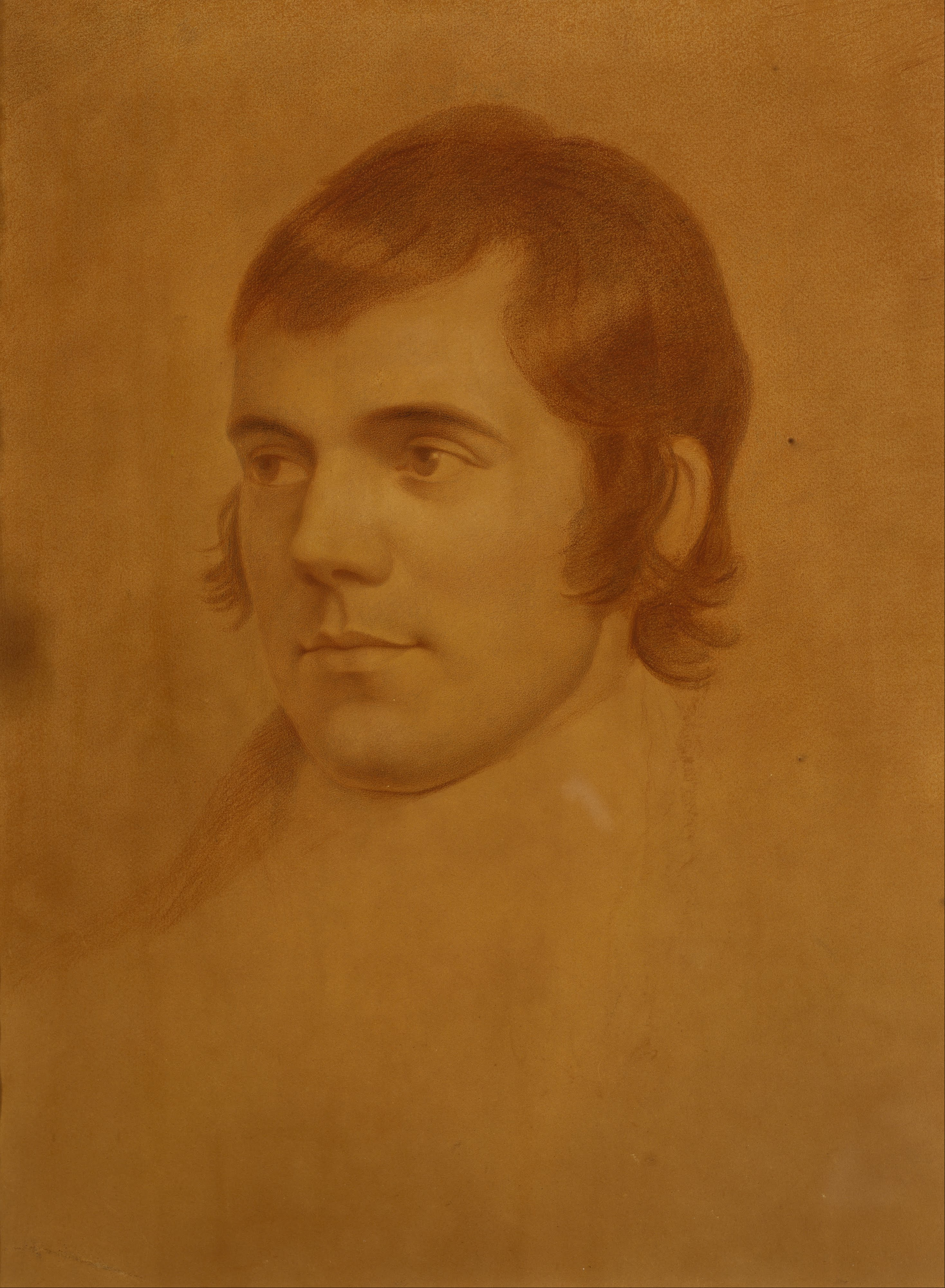
Skirving's chalk drawing of Robert Burns was based on Alexander Nasmyth's famous portrait.

After studying both in Rome and London, he settled in Edinburgh, where he obtained some fame as a portrait-painter. His most successful portraits were executed in crayon.

The best known work is his pastel portrait of Robert Burns, executed partly from Nasmyth's famous portrait, and partly from Skirving's recollection of the poet, whom he met, it is said, at Edinburgh in 1786. This portrait was acquired by Sir Theodore Martin and is in the National Burns Collection.

Other of Skirving's sitters were Alexander Carlyle, D.D., of Inveresk, the mother of Jane Welsh Carlyle, Gavin Hamilton, Isabella Fraser-Tytler, Professor Dugald Stewart, Elizabeth Liddell, and John Hunter, principal of St. Andrews University. Skirving was eccentric, and did not pursue his art industriously. In later life he seldom produced more than one picture a year, his price being about one hundred guineas.

He died suddenly at Inveresk Lodge, Inveresk, East Lothian in 1819, and was buried at Athelstaneford churchyard. Some of his portraits are in the Scottish National Portrait Gallery, Edinburgh.

== Legacy ==
Skirving's portraits including one of his father and a self-portrait are in the National Galleries of Scotland. The sculptor John Henning named one of his sons Archibald Skirving Henning in 1805, in Skirving's honour. He became an artist and he has a few paintings in public collections in the United Kingdom.

== Descendants ==
His descendants include Robert Scot Skirving (1859-1956) who emigrated to Australia and grew to be an eminent surgeon there.
