= Alexander Lauder (chemist) =

Scottish agricultural chemist

Alexander Lauder FRSE FIC (1870–1943) was a Scottish agricultural chemist.

== Life ==
He was born in Greenock in 1870. He studied at the Andersonian College in Glasgow under Professor William Dittmar then at the University of Edinburgh.

He began as an assistant lecturer at University College Bangor in Wales. He then returned to the University of Edinburgh to lecture in Agricultural Chemistry, also lecturing at the East of Scotland College of Agriculture. During this period he lived at 13 George Square in Edinburgh. In 1905 Lauder obtained a DSc from the University of Edinburgh.

In 1910 he was elected a Fellow of the Royal Society of Edinburgh. His proposers were Sir James Johnston Dobbie, Alexander Crum Brown, Sir James Walker and Arthur Pillans Laurie. He served as the Society’s Secretary 1923 to 1928.

He died in Greenock on 11 November 1943.

== Publications ==
- Chemistry and Agriculture (1933)
