= Thomas Peter Anderson Stuart =

Sir Thomas Peter Anderson Stuart
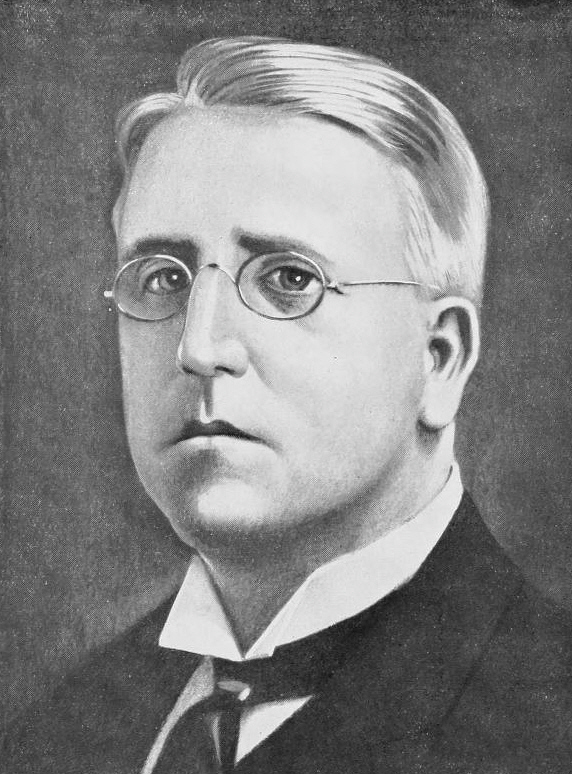
- Born: June 20, 1856
- Died: February 29, 1920 (aged 63)
- Known for: Chair of Anatomy and Physiology, founder of the medical school at University of Sydney
- Spouses: Elizabeth (Lizza) Ainsley (m. 1882; death 1886) Dorothy Primrose (m. 1894)

Academic work
- Discipline: Biology
- Sub-discipline: Physiology

Sir Thomas Peter Anderson Stuart (20 June 1856 – 29 February 1920) was a Scottish-born professor of physiology, founder of the medical school at the University of Sydney.

== Early life ==
Stuart was born in Dumfries, Scotland in 1856. His father, Alexander Stuart, was a master clothier & tailor, a magistrate and a member of the town council; and his mother Jane, née Anderson worked in the home and supported charities. Stuart was educated at Dumfries Academy until 14 years of age and was then apprenticed to a pharmacist. Stuart soon passed the preliminary examination of the Pharmaceutical Society, and at 16 the minor examination which entitled him to registration as a chemist when he turned 21.

=== University of Edinburgh, first marriage ===
Before he was eligible to be a chemist, passed the entrance exams to study medicine at the University of Edinburgh, then spent a year at Wolfenbüttel, Germany, studying French and German. In November 1875 Stuart returned to Scotland to study medicine and graduated in 1880. He was an excellent student, coming first in his year, graduating with first class honors and the Ettles scholarship.

After graduating, Stuart was asked by Professor William Rutherford to become his chief demonstrator; in preparation for this he made further studies in physiology and chemistry at Strassburg (then located in Germany). A year later, Stuart returned to Edinburgh, took up his duties as demonstrator, and qualified for the degree of M.D. in 1882. On 21 November 1882 Stuart married Elizabeth (Lizza) Ainslie.

== University of Sydney ==
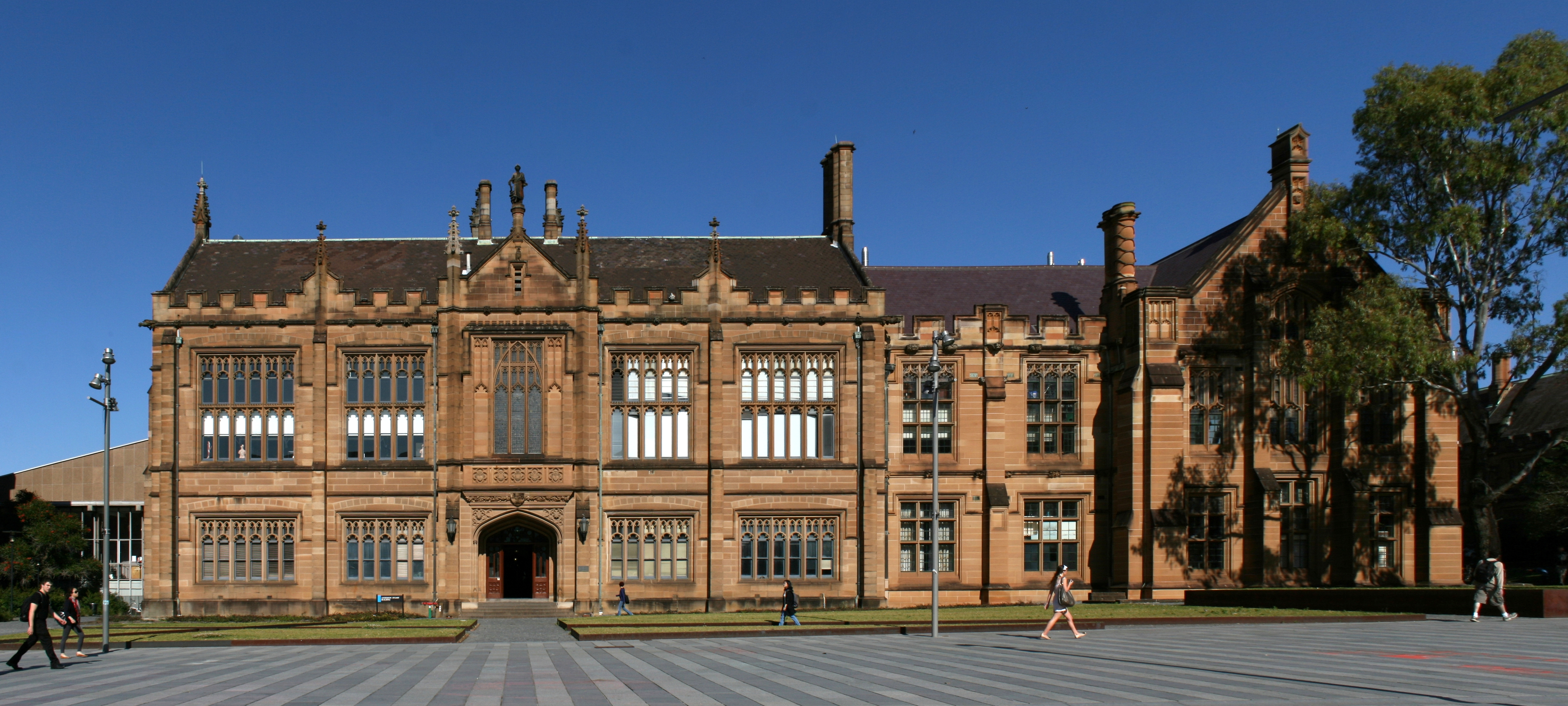
The eponymous Anderson Stuart building at Sydney University

In 1882 Stuart successfully applied for the job of Professorship of Anatomy and Physiology at the University of Sydney's newly formed medical school. He arrived in Sydney with his wife aboard the Parramatta in March 1883. Stuart initially taught in the temporary medical school building, a partially completed four roomed cottage. He had refused to wait until its doors and windows were installed and instead began "according to my timetable". There were only six students in the first year, and Stuart failed them all as they did not reach his expectations.

=== Creation of the medical school at University of Sydney ===
Stuart immediately started lobbying for more staff and a larger building, and in June 1884 the university had agreed to build a permanent medical school and plans were drawn up by James Barnet, the government architect. Plans were approved in November 1884, the government allocated £15,000 towards its construction in 1885. Instead of following the plans, Stuart used the funds to lay the foundations of a larger building - forcing the government and university to spend more to complete it. This deception invoked a negative reaction from his contemporaries who dubbed the building "Andy's Folly", believing that the Medical School would not be successful enough to fill it.

Around that time, Stuart's marriage to Lizza Ainsley ended in separation, after which he went to stay with his friend Robert Scot Skirving. Lizza later died of a morphia overdose on February 28, 1886.

In 1886 Stuart reluctantly oversaw the entry of the first woman to study medicine in Australia, Dagmar Berne. He publicly commented that "I think that the proper place for a woman is in the home; the proper function for a woman is to be a man's wife, and for women to be the mothers of future generations". Many commentators believe that Stuart deliberately failed Berne in examinations that he marked - causing her to leave Australia to complete her studies in France. The first woman to graduate medicine at the University of Sydney did so in 1893, when he was on leave overseas, and unable to mark the exams.

In 1889, the new Medical School Building was substantially completed; interior fitting was finalised in 1892. The building is regarded by The University of Sydney as part of "one of the most important groups of Gothic Revival architecture and Tudor Revival architecture in Australia". The number of students in the medical school had increased from 6 in 1883 to 604 in 1912, and within his lifetime it was one of the largest British Empire medical schools outside Britain.

After the completion of the building and establishment of the Medical School, Stuart dedicated himself to organising and being a public figure as part of a variety of boards and organisations. Stuart also prepared a bibliography of scientific literature in the libraries of New South Wales. Stuart oversaw the appointment of many notable demonstrators and lecturers in his department including Sir Alexander McCormick, Professor James Thomas Wilson, Sir James Graham, Sir Charles James Martin, Sir Almroth Wright and Professor Henry George Chapman. When Stuart's chair was divided in 1890 he retained physiology, and Wilson was appointed to the new professorship of anatomy.

== Public life ==
In 1980 Stuart was asked to become a member of the board of health; and from 1893 to 1896, was medical adviser to the government and president of the Board of Health, the dual offices carrying a salary of £1030 a year. Some objection was made to Stuart undertaking these positions while still a full-time officer of the university. A public service board having been constituted it ruled that though Stuart was a highly efficient officer he should give his whole time to the government positions. Stuart decided to resign as president, but continued to be a member of the board for the remainder of his life. On 18 September 1894, Stuart married Dorothy Primrose, a relative of Lord Rosebery.

== Royal Prince Alfred Hospital and late life ==
Stuart began to do some public lecturing and took an active interest in the Royal Prince Alfred Hospital. In 1901, Stuart became chairman, and it was largely due to his abilities that this hospital became the largest general hospital in Australia. In 1901, Stuart was responsible for the opening of a department of dentistry at the university. In 1905, Stuart became the inaugural president of the United Dental Hospital of Sydney, in doing so, he had to overcome the opposition of American-trained dentists led by Henry Peach. Later that year, he was appointed the first president of the Australasian Massage Association (later renamed the Australian Physiotherapy Association).

In 1914, he was made a knight bachelor.

== Eugenics ==
Stuart was a supporter of Francis Galton and the Eugenics Education Society,. Historian Dr Diana Wyndham describes him as part of the medical group of Australian eugenicists who believed that eugenics could be used to reduce disease and suffering. He was strongly involved in founding the Institute of Tropical Medicine, whose purpose was to research whether white people could successfully live in the tropics - with the long term political aim of encouraging more white Europeans to move the Northern Australia, thus keeping out the "Asiatic races".

He was president of the Immigration League of Australia from in the early 1900s, which advocated for the immigration of white Europeans to Australia to deter the threat of "alien race[s]".

In 1912 attended the inaugural International Eugenics Conference as the delegate of The University of Sydney where scientists and politicians discussed ways to "improve" human hereditary.

== Illness and death ==
Early in 1919, he became ill and an exploratory operation disclosed that his abdominal cancer was hopeless. That same year, he gave his last lecture, which was attended by his son, Bouverie. He continued to work until January 1920, and he died on at his home in Double Bay on 29 February 1920. He held the Dean of Medicine position from 1883 till his death.

Lady Stuart and their four sons (two of whom later became medical practitioners) survived him. Stuart's portrait by Sir John Longstaff is at the National Gallery, Sydney. Marble busts of Stuart by James White are held by the Royal Prince Alfred Hospital and by the University of Sydney. His granddaughter, Lady (Primrose) Potter, was named after his second wife.

== Legacy ==
Until 1960, the old Medical School building was called the Barnet-Vernon-Wilkinson Old Medical School Building. It was then renamed the Anderson Stuart Building in recognition for Stuart's contribution to the Medical School. The building has an engraving of his arms and initials, AS, on the eastern main entrance.

== Personal life ==
Anderson Stuart was a tall man; his prominent nose gave him the nickname 'Coracoid', from the Latin corax, a crow. Stuart was an excellent lecturer, a first-rate teacher and had a keen business sense. At times, Stuart made enemies and he was not always willing to listen to the opinions of others. Anderson Stuart was an active Freemason, serving as the Deputy Grand Master of the United Grand Lodge of New South Wales.
