= Adam Skirving =

Scottish songwriter

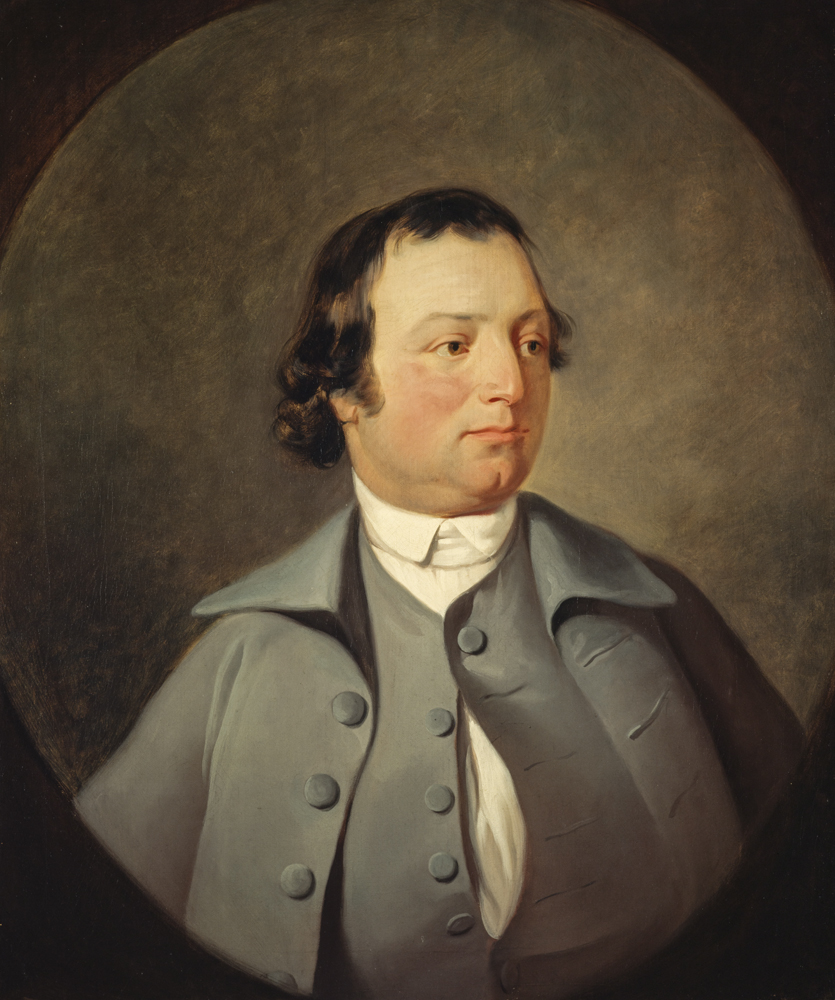
- By his son
- Born: 1719
- Died: 1803 (aged 83–84)
- Occupations: Farmer and song writer
- Known for: "Hey, Johnnie Cope, Are Ye Waking Yet?"
- Children: Archibald Skirving; Robert Skirving

Adam Skirving (1719 in Haddington, East Lothian – April 1803) was a Scottish songwriter known for "Hey, Johnnie Cope, Are Ye Waking Yet?".

== Life ==
Skirving was born in 1719. He became a farmer at Garleton Castle, near Haddington, and this is where he was married twice. His eldest son Archibald Skirving painted portraits whilst his second son, Robert, inherited his mother's musical talents but went into the army. All three of these wrote verses but it is Adam who is best remembered as a song writer and his wife is credited with some of the tunes. Skirving was a farmer at "Prora" but he was not keen to write and spent much of his time playing golf, socialising and visiting the horse races.

Skirving died in April 1803. He was buried at Athelstaneford. His reputation rests on two Jacobite ballads on the Battle of Prestonpans, one of which, "Hey, Johnnie Cope, Are Ye Waking Yet?", whilst very far from an accurate narrative, is popular enough to be found in many collections of Scottish songs. Skirving wrote the words to a well known tune.
