= Athelstaneford =

Coordinates: 55.986°N 2.748°W

Athelstaneford: Scots: Atholstanefuird, Elshinfuird
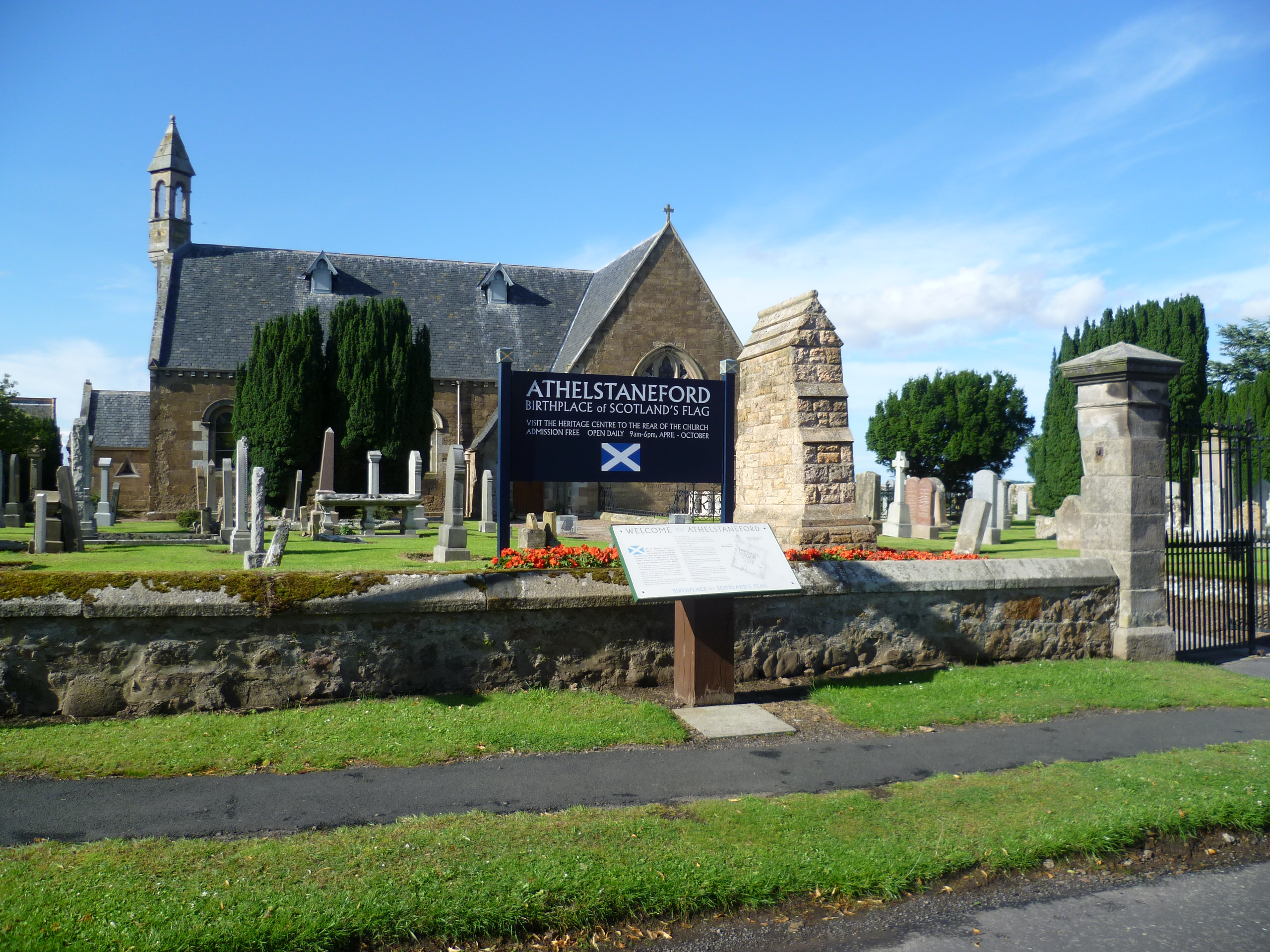
- Athelstaneford Kirk

- Location within East Lothian
- OS grid reference: NT533772
- Council area: East Lothian
- Lieutenancy area: East Lothian
- Country: Scotland
- Sovereign state: United Kingdom
- Post town: NORTH BERWICK
- Postcode district: EH39
- Dialling code: 01620
- Police: Scotland
- Fire: Scottish
- Ambulance: Scottish
- UK Parliament: Lothian East
- Scottish Parliament: East Lothian

Athelstaneford (/ˈæθəlsteɪnfərd/, locally [ˈɛlʃɪnfərd] or [ˈɛlsɪnθərd]) is a village in East Lothian, Scotland. It lies 3.5 miles (about 6 km) north-east of the market town of Haddington and about 28 kilometres (17 mi) east of Edinburgh.

== Battle of Athelstaneford ==
According to popular legend, Athelstaneford is where the original Scottish saltire - the white diagonal cross on a sky blue background - was first adopted. On the eve of a battle between rival armies of Picts and Northumbrians in 832AD, Saint Andrew, who was crucified on a diagonal cross, came to the Pictish King Óengus II in a vision promising victory. The next morning the Picts saw a white cross formed by clouds in the sky. They won the battle and attributed their victory to the blessing of Saint Andrew, adopting his form of the cross as their flag, and naming him as their patron saint. The leader of the retreating Angles, a man called Athelstan, was said to have been slain at a nearby river crossing, hence the name Athelstaneford. However, there is considerable doubt as to even the basic historic facts. The Pictish king may actually have been Óengus I while the English leader may have been the English king Æthelstan, who invaded Scotland in AD 934. Whatever the truth, the legend has cemented Athelstaneford's place in Scotland's history.

== Attractions ==
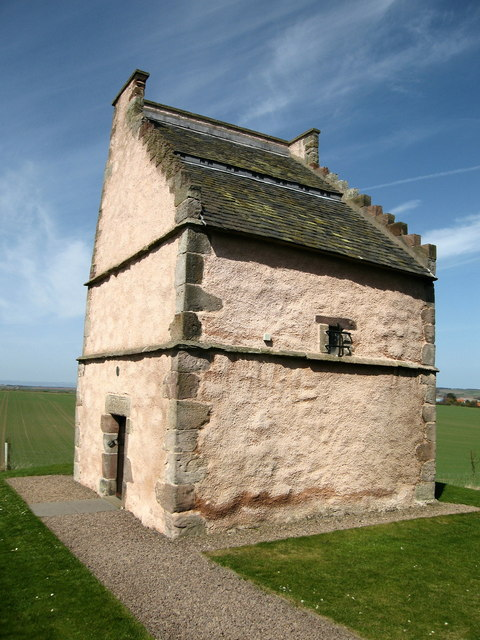
Athelstaneford Heritage Centre is housed in a doocot built in 1583

The village is home to the National Flag Heritage Centre which occupies a lectern doocot built in 1583 and rebuilt in 1996. It is at the back of the village church.

Today the village is surrounded by rich farmland and has little in the way of amenities. Tourists can follow the "Saltire Trail", a road route which passes by various local landmarks and places of historical interest.

Athelstaneford Parish Kirk has a connection with the author Nigel Tranter who was a prominent supporter of the Scottish Flag Trust. He married in the church, and in April 2008 a permanent exhibition of his memorabilia was mounted in the north transept of the church. Items include a copy of Nigel Tranter's old typewriter, a collection of manuscripts and books, and other personal items. The display was previously at Lennoxlove House, and prior to that at Abbotsford House, the home of Sir Walter Scott.

Gilmerton House, home of the Kinloch baronets is in the parish of Athelstaneford and now operates as a private hire and exclusive use venue.

== See also ==
- List of places in East Lothian
